= Bourg-en-Lavaux =

- Municipality
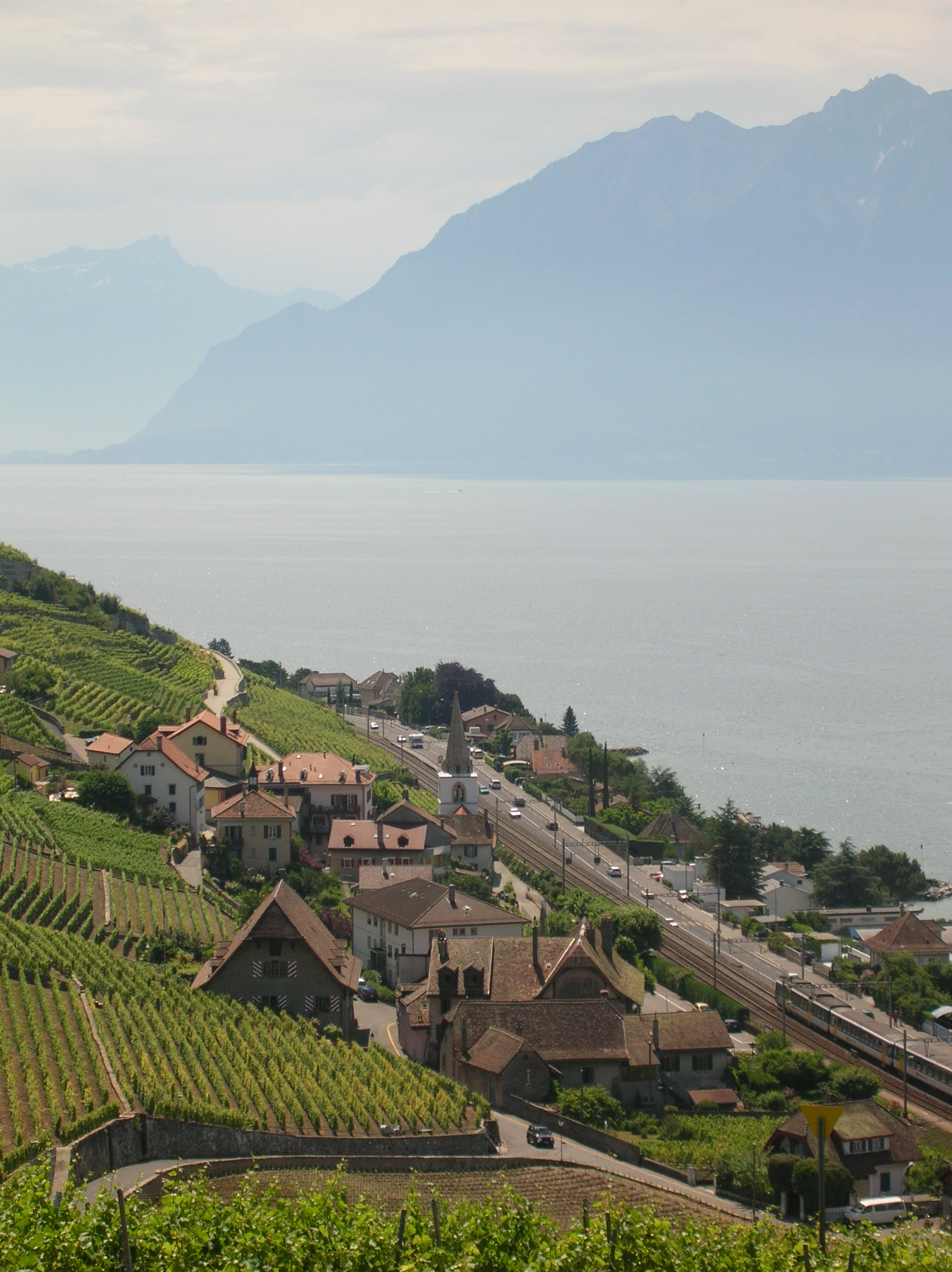
- Villette village

- Flag Coat of arms
- Location of Bourg-en-Lavaux
- Location within Switzerland Location within Canton of Vaud
- Coordinates: 46°30′N 6°43′E
- Country: Switzerland
- Canton: Vaud
- District: Lavaux-Oron

Government
  - Mayor: Syndic

Area
  - Total: 9.65 km^{2} (3.73 sq mi)

Population (2009)
  - Total: 593
  - Density: 61.5/km^{2} (159/sq mi)
- Time zone: UTC+01:00 (CET)
  - Summer (DST): UTC+02:00 (CEST)
- SFOS number: 5613
- ISO 3166 code: CH-VD
- Surrounded by: Forel (Lavaux), Lugrin (FR-74), Lutry, Meillerie (FR-74), Savigny
- Website: www.b-e-l.ch

Bourg-en-Lavaux is a municipality in the Swiss canton of Vaud, located in the district of Lavaux-Oron.

The municipalities of Cully, Epesses, Grandvaux, Riex and Villette (Lavaux) merged on 1 July 2011 into the new municipality of Bourg-en-Lavaux.

== History ==
Aerial view: Villette, Grandvaux (1948)

Aerial view, from left to right: Cully, Riex, Epesses (1960)

The first written mention of Cully took place in 967 under the name Cusliacum. Epesses is first mentioned in 1453 as Espesses. Grandvaux is first mentioned in 1250 as de Gravaz. In 1445 it was mentioned as Grandvaulx. Riex is first mentioned in 1184 as Ruez.

=== Cully ===
The earliest traces of human activity in Cully comes from the Neolithic, when Lake Geneva was near the modern port of Moratel. During the Roman Empire, the route from Lausanne to Great Saint Bernard ran through the area. From this time, some walls and coins have been found preserved.

The first written mention of the place took place in 967 under the name Cusliacum. Later appeared the names Cusliaco (12th century), Custiacum (1154), Cullie (1226), Cully (1275) and Culyer (1383). The origin of the name is not clearly understood. It is possibly derived from the Roman family name Coclius.

The first document involving Cully, saw it given to the King of Besançon. However, because Cully at the same time was under Villett parishe, which belonged to the bishop of Lausanne, there were constant disputes which led in 1246 to it being given back to the bishop of Lausanne. In the 14th century the inhabitants the acquired the right to hold a weekly market and fortify the village.

With the conquest of Vaud by Bern in 1536, Cully came under the administration of the Bailiwick of Lausanne. After the collapse of the Ancien régime, the village belonged from 1798 to 1803 during the Helvetic Republic to the Canton of Léman. In 1798 Cully Lavaux became the capital of the district, as it was in the central part of the district. It was not until 1824, that Cully attained the status of an independent political community. A project to merge the independent municipalities Cully, Epesses, Riex, Grandvaux, and Villette (Lavaux) failed in a vote on 27 February 2005 due to the resistance of the population of Grandvaux but was finally complete on 1 July 2011.

=== Epesses ===
Traces of a Roman road and coins finds indicate an early settlement in the municipality. The name Epesses comes from the Latin word spissa (meaning dense, thick) probably in reference to the spruce.

With the conquest by Bern of Vaud in 1536, the village came under the administration of the Bailiwick of Lausanne. After the collapse of the ancien régime, between 1798 and 1803 it was part of the Canton of Léman during the Helvetic Republic and then fell under the Canton of Vaud. In 1798 it was assigned to the district of Lavaux.

It was not until 1824, when the community was split from Villette, that Epesses attained the status of an independent political municipality. A project to merge the independent municipalities Cully, Epesses, Riex, Grandvaux, and Villette failed in a vote on 27 February 2005 due to the resistance of the population of Grandvaux, yet it was finally completed on 1 July 2011. Since then Cully is part of the community of Bourg-en-Lavaux.

== Geography ==
Bourg-en-Lavaux has an area, as of 2009, of 9.65 km^{2} (3.73 sq mi). Of this area, 6.76 km^{2} (2.61 mi^{2}) or 58.1% is used for agricultural purposes, while 2.19 km^{2} (0.85 mi^{2}) or 18.8% is forested. Of the rest of the land, 2.4 km^{2} (0.93 mi^{2}) or 20.6% is settled (buildings or roads), 0.06 km^{2} (15 acres) or 0.5% is either rivers or lakes and 0.01 km^{2} (2.5 acres) or 0.1% is unproductive land.

== Historic population ==
The historical population is given in the following chart:

== Transportation ==
The municipality has four railway stations: Villette VD, Cully, and Epesses on the Simplon line and Grandvaux on the Lausanne–Bern line.

== Heritage sites of national significance ==
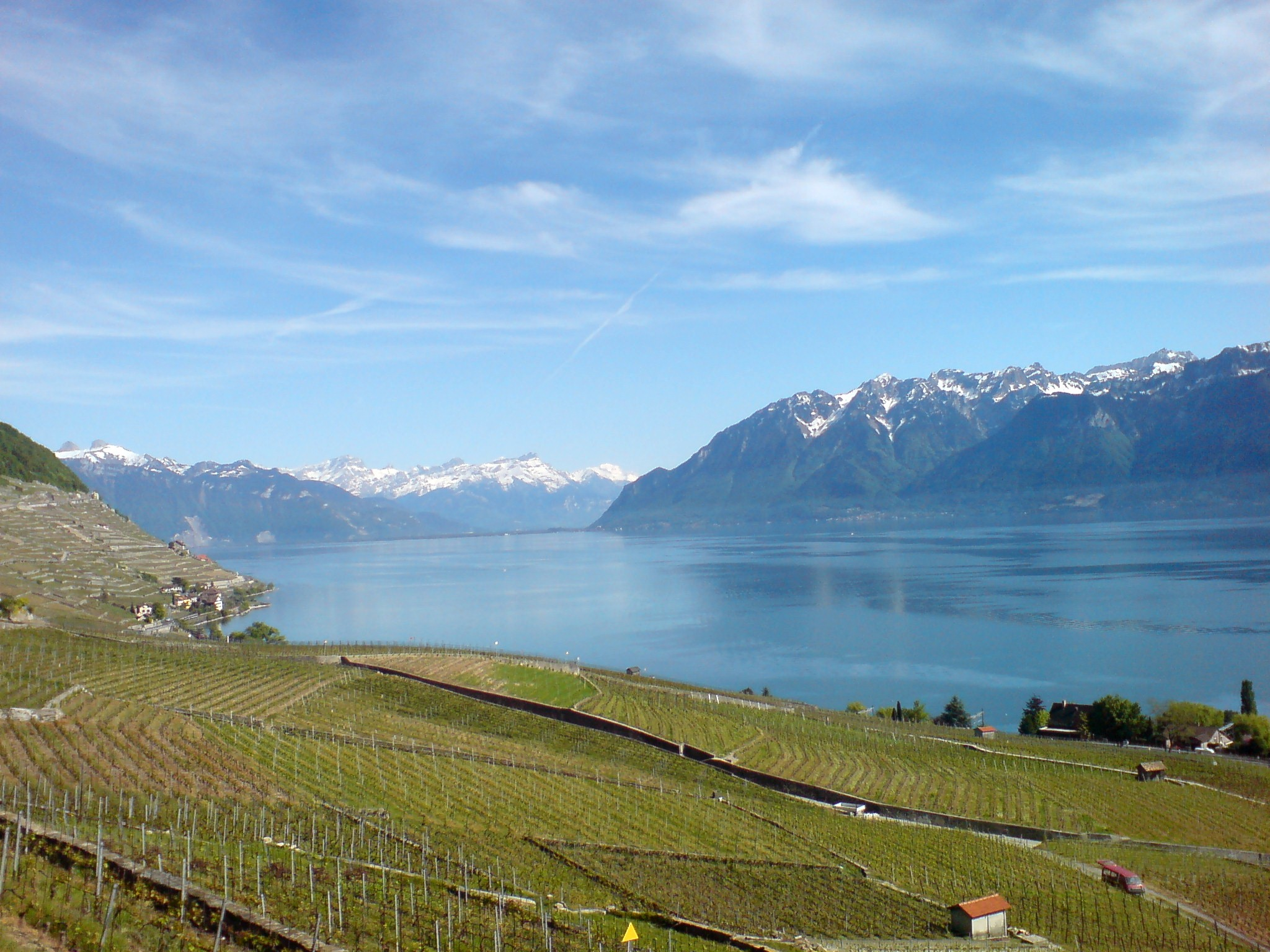
Lavaux vineyards near Riex

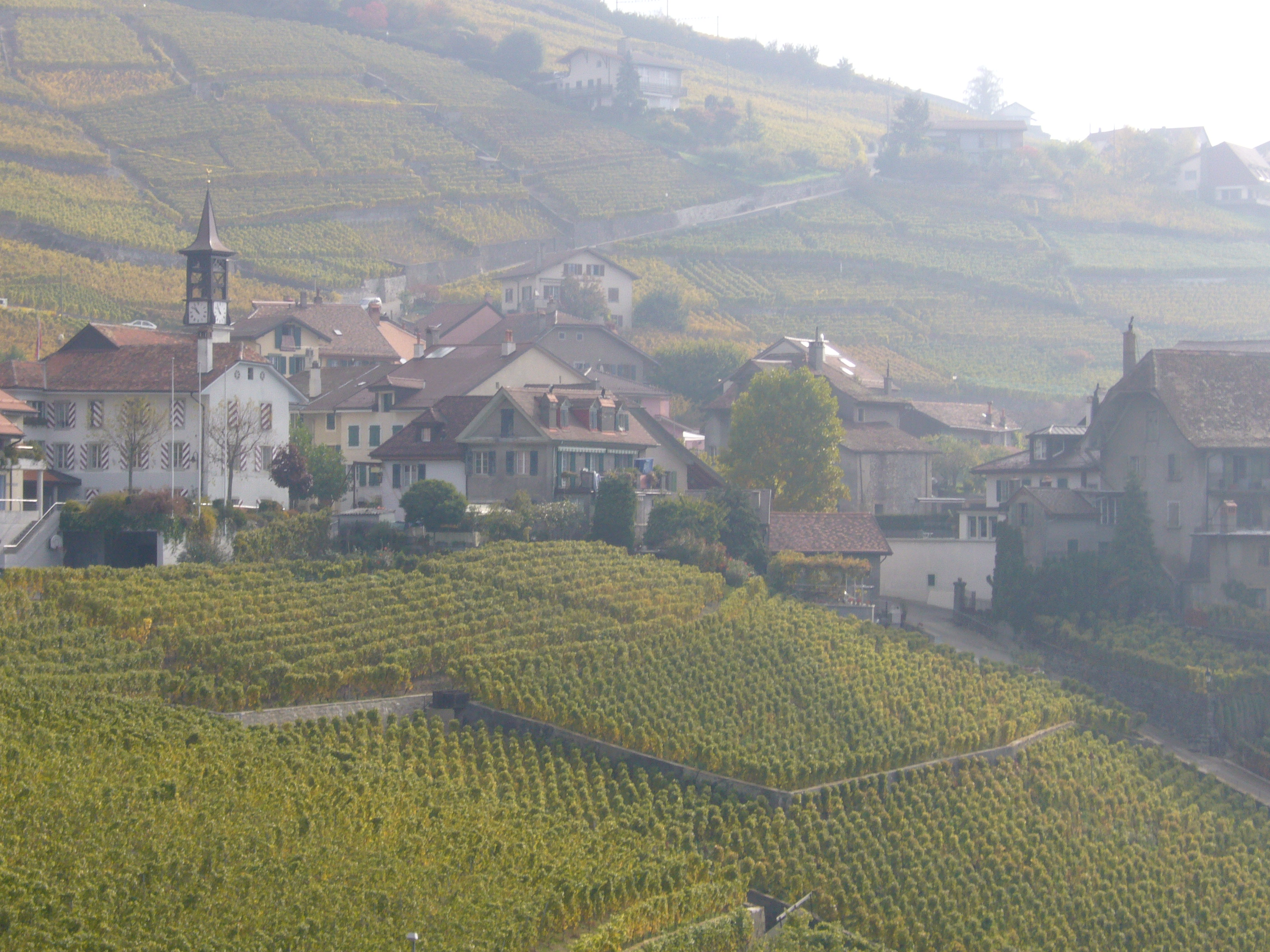
Aran village

The Maison Maillardo and part of the UNESCO World Heritage Site: Lavaux, Vineyard Terraces are listed as Swiss heritage site of national significance. The entire villages of Grandvaux, Riex and Aran are part of the Inventory of Swiss Heritage Sites.

The Maison Maillardo is notable for its 16th-century late-gothic windows.
