= Lavaux District =

Coordinates: 46°30′N 6°45′E

Lavaux District District de Lavaux
- District
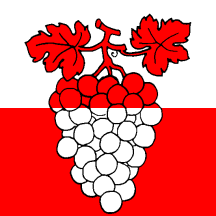
- Flag Coat of arms

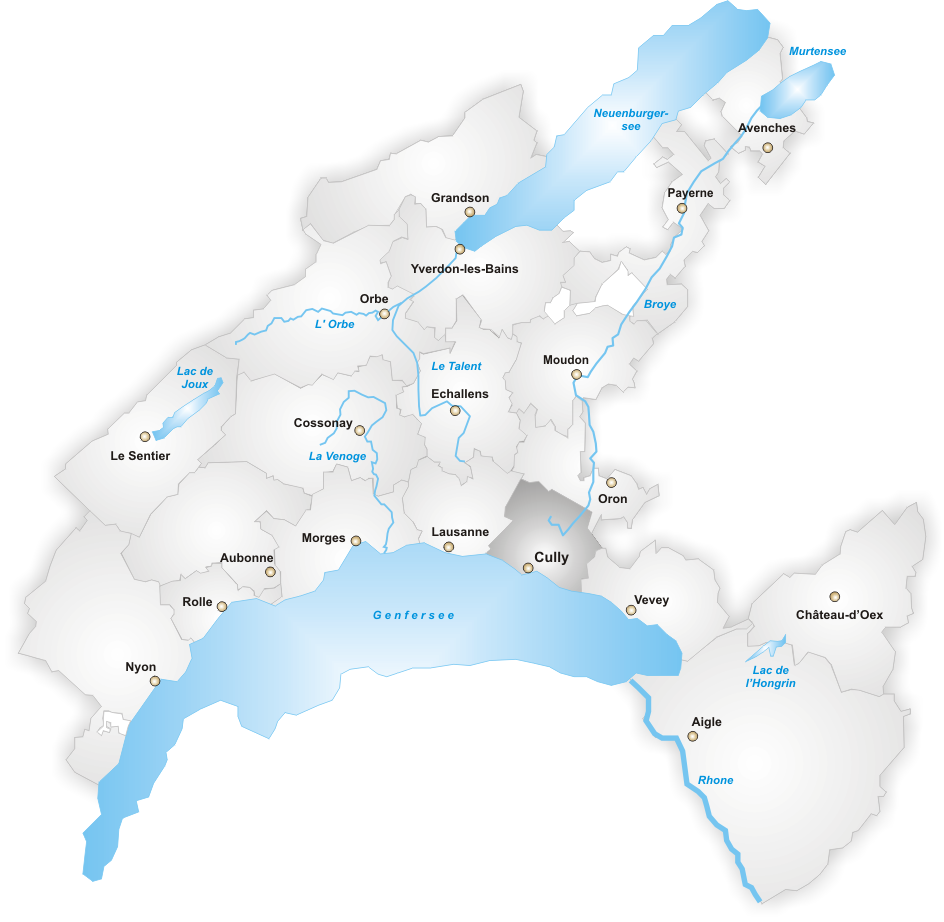
- Country: Switzerland
- Canton: Vaud
- Capital: Cully

Area
  - Total: 7,884 km^{2} (3,044 sq mi)

Population (2006)
  - Total: 23.861
  - Density: 0.003027/km^{2} (0.007839/sq mi)
- Time zone: UTC+1 (CET)
  - Summer (DST): UTC+2 (CEST)
- Municipalities: 12

Lavaux District was a district located on the north-eastern shore of Lake Geneva (Lac Léman) in the Swiss-romand canton of Vaud between Lausanne and Vevey. The capital of the district was Cully, but used to be Lutry. The district is part of the World Heritage Site listed region of Lavaux. It consisted of the following municipalities:

- Chexbres
- Cully
- Epesses
- Forel
- Grandvaux
- Lutry
- Puidoux
  - includes the village of Treytorrens
- Riex
- Rivaz
- Saint-Saphorin
- Savigny
- Villette

== Mergers and name changes ==
On 1 September 2006 the municipalities of Chexbres, Cully, Epesses, Forel (Lavaux), Grandvaux, Lutry, Puidoux, Riex, Rivaz, Saint-Saphorin (Lavaux), Savigny and Villette (Lavaux) came from the District de Lavaux to join the Lavaux-Oron District.
