= Villette VD railway station =

Railway station in Villette, Vaud, Switzerland

Villette VD
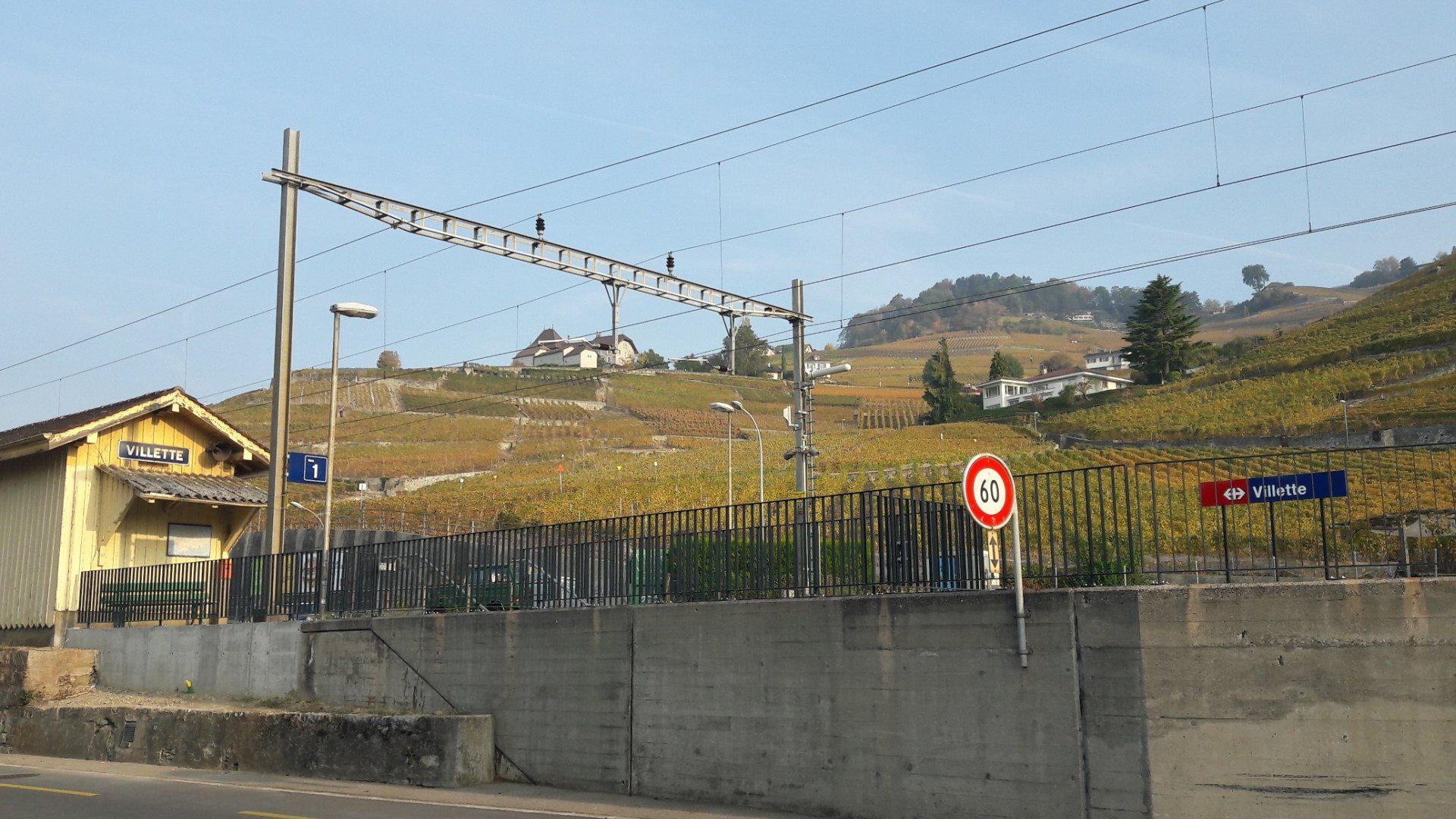
- The station platform in 2018

General information
- Location: Villette; Switzerland
- Coordinates: 46°29′43″N 6°42′26″E
- Elevation: 387 m (1,270 ft)
- Owner: Swiss Federal Railways
- Line: Simplon line
- Distance: 6.7 km (4.2 mi) from Lausanne
- Platforms: 2 (2 side platforms)
- Tracks: 2
- Train operators: Swiss Federal Railways

Construction
- Accessible: No

Other information
- Station code: 8501123 (VTE)
- Fare zone: 19 (mobilis)

Passengers
- 2023: 130 per weekday (SBB)

Services
Preceding station	RER Vaud	Following station
Lutry towards Grandson	R1	Cully towards Bex
Lutry towards Grandson	R2	Cully towards Bex
Location

Villette VD railway station (French: Gare de Villette VD) is a railway station in the locality of Villette, within the municipality of Bourg-en-Lavaux, in the Swiss canton of Vaud. It is an intermediate stop on the standard gauge Simplon line of Swiss Federal Railways.

== Services ==
As of the December 2024 timetable change, the following services stop at Villette VD:

- RER Vaud R1 / R2: half-hourly service between Grandson and Cully.
