= Epesse =

Epesse could refer to:

- Epesses, a commune in Switzerland
- Les Epesses, a commune in France
- Epessë, a type of an elven name in J. R. R. Tolkien's fantasy universe Middle-earth
