= Grandvaux =

- Former municipality
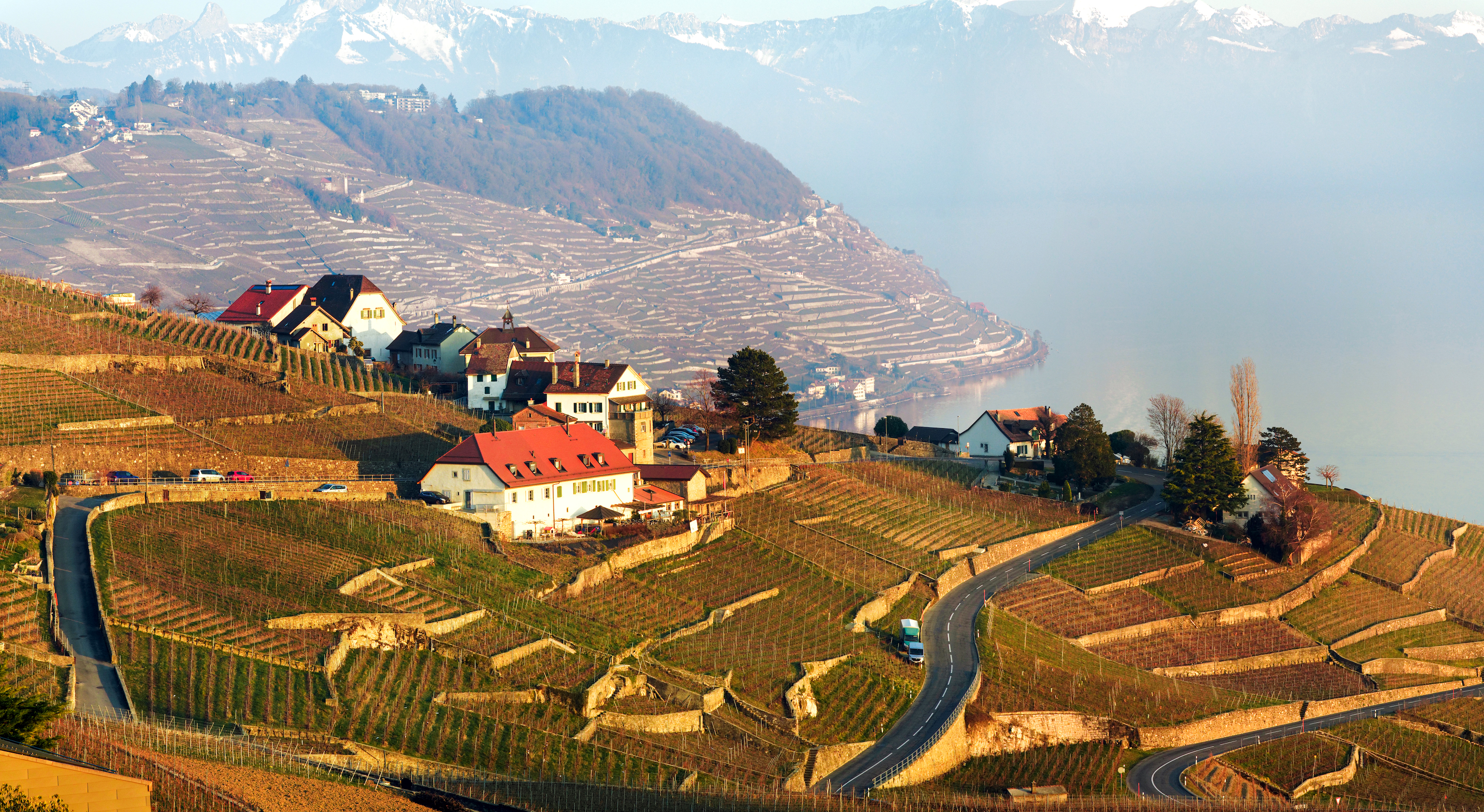

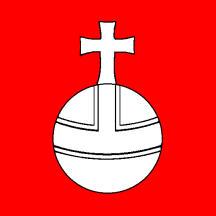
- Flag Coat of arms
- Location of Grandvaux
- Location within Switzerland Location within Canton of Vaud
- Coordinates: 46°29′N 6°43′E
- Country: Switzerland
- Canton: Vaud
- District: Lavaux-Oron

Area
  - Total: 2.94 km^{2} (1.14 sq mi)
- Elevation: 489 m (1,604 ft)

Population (2009)
  - Total: 2,014
  - Density: 685/km^{2} (1,770/sq mi)
- Demonym: Les Grandvaliens
- Time zone: UTC+01:00 (CET)
  - Summer (DST): UTC+02:00 (CEST)
- Postal code: 1091
- SFOS number: 5605
- ISO 3166 code: CH-VD
- Surrounded by: Cully, Forel (Lavaux), Meillerie (FR-74), Villette (Lavaux)
- Website: www.grandvaux.ch

Grandvaux is a former municipality in the Swiss canton of Vaud, located in the district of Lavaux-Oron. The municipalities of Cully, Epesses, Grandvaux, Riex and Villette (Lavaux) merged on 1 July 2011 into the new municipality of Bourg-en-Lavaux.

== History ==
Grandvaux is first mentioned in 1250 as de Gravaz. In 1445 it was mentioned as Grandvaulx.

== Geography ==
Aerial view (1948)

Grandvaux has an area, as of 2009, of 2.94 square kilometres (1.14 mi^{2}). Of this area, 1.57 km^{2} (0.61 mi^{2} or 53.4%) is used for agricultural purposes, while 0.3 km^{2} (0.12 mi^{2} or 10.2%) is forested. Of the rest of the land, 1.04 km^{2} (0.40 mi^{2} or 35.4%) is settled (buildings or roads).

Of the built up area, housing and buildings made up 22.1% and transportation infrastructure made up 11.6%. Out of the forested land, all of the forested land area is covered with heavy forests. Of the agricultural land, 22.4% is used for growing crops and 11.9% is pastures, while 19.0% is used for orchards or vine crops.

The municipality was part of the Lavaux District until it was dissolved on 31 August 2006, and Grandvaux became part of the new district of Lavaux-Oron.

The municipality is located on the shores of Lake Geneva. It stretches from the lake up to the 795 m (2,608 ft) high Signal de Grandvaux. It consists of the village of Grandvaux, several hamlets including Curson as well as woods in the Jorat.

== Coat of arms ==
The blazon of the municipal coat of arms is Gules, an Orb argent.

== Demographics ==
Grandvaux has a population (as of 2009) of 2,014. As of 2008, 18.9% of the population are resident foreign nationals. Over the last 10 years (1999–2009) the population has changed at a rate of 4.4%. It has changed at a rate of 1.8% due to migration and at a rate of 2.2% due to births and deaths.

Most of the population (as of 2000) speaks French (1,628 or 84.0%), with German being second most common (135 or 7.0%) and English being third (81 or 4.2%). There are 29 people who speak Italian.

Of the population in the municipality 365 or about 18.8% were born in Grandvaux and lived there in 2000. There were 752 or 38.8% who were born in the same canton, while 344 or 17.8% were born somewhere else in Switzerland, and 424 or 21.9% were born outside of Switzerland.

In 2008 there were fourteen live births to Swiss citizens and two births to non-Swiss citizens, and in same time span there were eight deaths of Swiss citizens and one non-Swiss citizen death. Ignoring immigration and emigration, the population of Swiss citizens increased by six while the foreign population increased by one. There were eight Swiss men and eight Swiss women who emigrated from Switzerland. At the same time, there were thirteen non-Swiss men and twenty non-Swiss women who immigrated from another country to Switzerland. The total Swiss population change in 2008 (from all sources, including moves across municipal borders) was an increase of fifteen and the non-Swiss population increased by thirty people. This represents a population growth rate of 2.3%.

The age distribution, as of 2009, in Grandvaux is; 196 children or 9.7% of the population are between 0 and 9 years old and 228 teenagers or 11.3% are between 10 and 19. Of the adult population, 168 people or 8.3% of the population are between 20 and 29 years old. 253 people or 12.6% are between 30 and 39, 347 people or 17.2% are between 40 and 49, and 315 people or 15.7% are between 50 and 59. The senior population distribution is 285 people or 14.2% of the population are between 60 and 69 years old, 131 people or 6.5% are between 70 and 79, there are 74 people or 3.7% who are between 80 and 89, and there are 15 people or 0.7% who are 90 and older.

As of 2000, there were 736 people who were single and never married in the municipality. There were 953 married individuals, 115 widows or widowers and 133 individuals who are divorced.

As of 2000 the average number of residents per living room was 0.55 which is fewer people per room than the cantonal average of 0.61 per room. In this case, a room is defined as space of a housing unit of at least 4 m^{2} (40 ft^{2}) as normal bedrooms, dining rooms, living rooms, kitchens and habitable cellars and attics. About 59.8% of the total households were owner-occupied, or in other words did not pay rent (though they may have a mortgage or a rent-to-own agreement).

As of 2000, there were 808 private households in the municipality, and an average of 2.3 persons per household. There were 234 households that consist of only one person and 38 households with five or more people. Out of a total of 823 households that answered this question, 28.4% were households made up of just one person and there were 7 adults who lived with their parents. Of the rest of the households, there are 246 married couples without children, 266 married couples with children There were 42 single parents with a child or children. There were 13 households that were made up of unrelated people and 15 households that were made up of some sort of institution or another collective housing.

In 2000 there were 457 single-family homes (or 65.9% of the total) out of a total of 693 inhabited buildings. There were 110 multi-family buildings (15.9%), along with 97 multi-purpose buildings that were mostly used for housing (14.0%) and 29 other use buildings (commercial or industrial) that also had some housing (4.2%). Of the single-family homes 59 were built before 1919, while 52 were built between 1990 and 2000. The greatest number of single-family homes (122) were built between 1981 and 1990. The most multi-family homes (35) were built before 1919 and the next most (21) were built between 1981 and 1990. There were 7 multi-family houses built between 1996 and 2000.

In 2000 there were 978 apartments in the municipality. The most common apartment size was 4 rooms of which there were 232. There were 41 single-room apartments and 358 apartments with five or more rooms. Of these apartments, a total of 782 apartments (80.0% of the total) were permanently occupied, while 178 apartments (18.2%) were seasonally occupied and 18 apartments (1.8%) were empty. As of 2009, the construction rate of new housing units was 1 new units per 1000 residents. The vacancy rate for the municipality, in 2010, was 0%.

The historical population is given in the following chart:

== Heritage sites of national significance ==
The Maison Maillardo and part of the UNESCO World Heritage Site: Lavaux, Vineyard Terraces are listed as Swiss heritage site of national significance. The entire village of Grandvaux is part of the Inventory of Swiss Heritage Sites.

The Maison Maillardo is notable for its 16th Century late-gothic windows.

== Politics ==
In the 2007 federal election the most popular party was the SVP which received 21.35% of the vote. The next three most popular parties were the SP (19.28%), the FDP (15.72%) and the FDP (15.72%). In the federal election, a total of 680 votes were cast, and the voter turnout was 52.4%.

== Economy ==
As of 2010, Grandvaux had an unemployment rate of 2.8%. As of 2008, there were 71 people employed in the primary economic sector and about 20 businesses involved in this sector. 60 people were employed in the secondary sector and there were 20 businesses in this sector. 203 people were employed in the tertiary sector, with 49 businesses in this sector. There were 1,046 residents of the municipality who were employed in some capacity, of which females made up 43.6% of the workforce.

In 2008 the total number of full-time equivalent jobs was 263. The number of jobs in the primary sector was 50, all of which were in agriculture. The number of jobs in the secondary sector was 55 of which 23 or (41.8%) were in manufacturing and 32 (58.2%) were in construction. The number of jobs in the tertiary sector was 158. In the tertiary sector; 35 or 22.2% were in the sale or repair of motor vehicles, 6 or 3.8% were in the movement and storage of goods, 29 or 18.4% were in a hotel or restaurant, 3 or 1.9% were in the information industry, 1 was the insurance or financial industry, 14 or 8.9% were technical professionals or scientists, 11 or 7.0% were in education and 45 or 28.5% were in health care.

In 2000, there were 146 workers who commuted into the municipality and 823 workers who commuted away. The municipality is a net exporter of workers, with about 5.6 workers leaving the municipality for every one entering. Of the working population, 11% used public transportation to get to work, and 71.1% used a private car.

== Religion ==
From the 2000 census, 570 or 29.4% were Roman Catholic, while 907 or 46.8% belonged to the Swiss Reformed Church. Of the rest of the population, there were 15 members of an Orthodox church (or about 0.77% of the population), there were 4 individuals (or about 0.21% of the population) who belonged to the Christian Catholic Church, and there were 39 individuals (or about 2.01% of the population) who belonged to another Christian church. There were 6 individuals (or about 0.31% of the population) who were Jewish, and 16 (or about 0.83% of the population) who were Islamic. There were 2 individuals who were Buddhist and 4 individuals who belonged to another church. 307 (or about 15.85% of the population) belonged to no church, are agnostic or atheist, and 82 individuals (or about 4.23% of the population) did not answer the question.

== Education ==
In Grandvaux about 685 or (35.4%) of the population have completed non-mandatory upper secondary education, and 524 or (27.1%) have completed additional higher education (either University or a Fachhochschule). Of the 524 who completed tertiary schooling, 49.6% were Swiss men, 29.0% were Swiss women, 11.5% were non-Swiss men and 9.9% were non-Swiss women.

In the 2009/2010 school year there were a total of 205 students in the Grandvaux school district. In the Vaud cantonal school system, two years of non-obligatory pre-school are provided by the political districts. During the school year, the political district provided pre-school care for a total of 665 children of which 232 children (34.9%) received subsidized pre-school care. The canton's primary school program requires students to attend for four years. There were 111 students in the municipal primary school program. The obligatory lower secondary school program lasts for six years and there were 94 students in those schools.

As of 2000, there were 50 students in Grandvaux who came from another municipality, while 232 residents attended schools outside the municipality.

== Sister cities ==
Grandvaux was sister cities with Nagara Furusato in Tōno, Iwate, Japan
