= Epesses =

- Former municipality
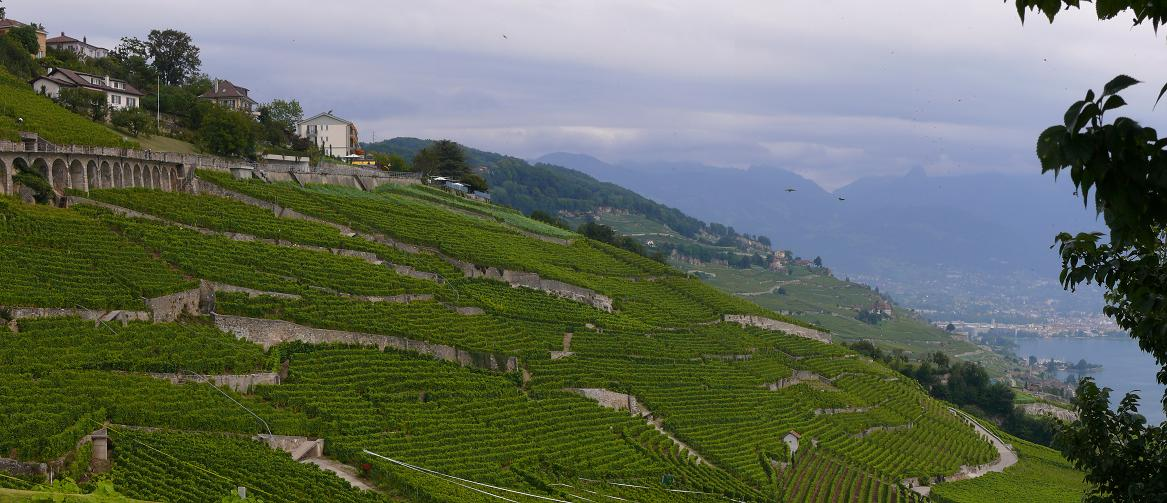
- Le Dézaley vineyards

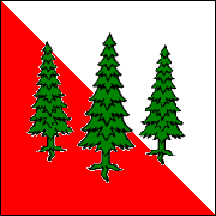
- Flag Coat of arms
- Location of Epesses
- Location within Switzerland Location within Canton of Vaud
- Coordinates: 46°30′N 6°45′E
- Country: Switzerland
- Canton: Vaud
- District: Lavaux-Oron

Area
  - Total: 1.59 km^{2} (0.61 sq mi)
- Elevation: 404 m (1,325 ft)

Population (December 2009)
  - Total: 332
  - Density: 209/km^{2} (541/sq mi)
- Time zone: UTC+01:00 (CET)
  - Summer (DST): UTC+02:00 (CEST)
- Postal code: 1098
- SFOS number: 5603
- ISO 3166 code: CH-VD
- Surrounded by: Cully, Forel (Lavaux), Meillerie (FR-74), Puidoux, Riex
- Twin towns: Burgdorf (Switzerland)
- Website: Profile (in French), SFSO statistics

Epesses is a former municipality in the Swiss canton of Vaud, located in the district of Lavaux-Oron on Lake Geneva. It is noted for its wine production.

The municipalities of Cully, Epesses, Grandvaux, Riex and Villette (Lavaux) merged on 1 July 2011 into the new municipality of Bourg-en-Lavaux.

== History ==
Traces of a Roman road and coins finds indicate an early settlement in the municipality. Epesses is first mentioned in 1453 as Espesses. The name comes from the Latin word spissa (meaning dense, thick) probably in reference to the spruce.

With the conquest by Bern of Vaud in 1536, the village came under the administration of the Bailiwick of Lausanne. After the collapse of the ancien régime, between 1798 and 1803 it was part of the Canton of Léman during the Helvetic Republic and then fell under the Canton of Vaud. In 1798 it was assigned to the district of Lavaux.

It was not until 1824, when the community was split from Villette, that Epesses attained the status of an independent political municipality. A project to merge the independent municipalities Cully, Epesses, Riex, Grandvaux, and Villette failed in a vote on 27 February 2005 due to the resistance of the population of Grandvaux. The project is therefore not being pursued.

== Geography ==
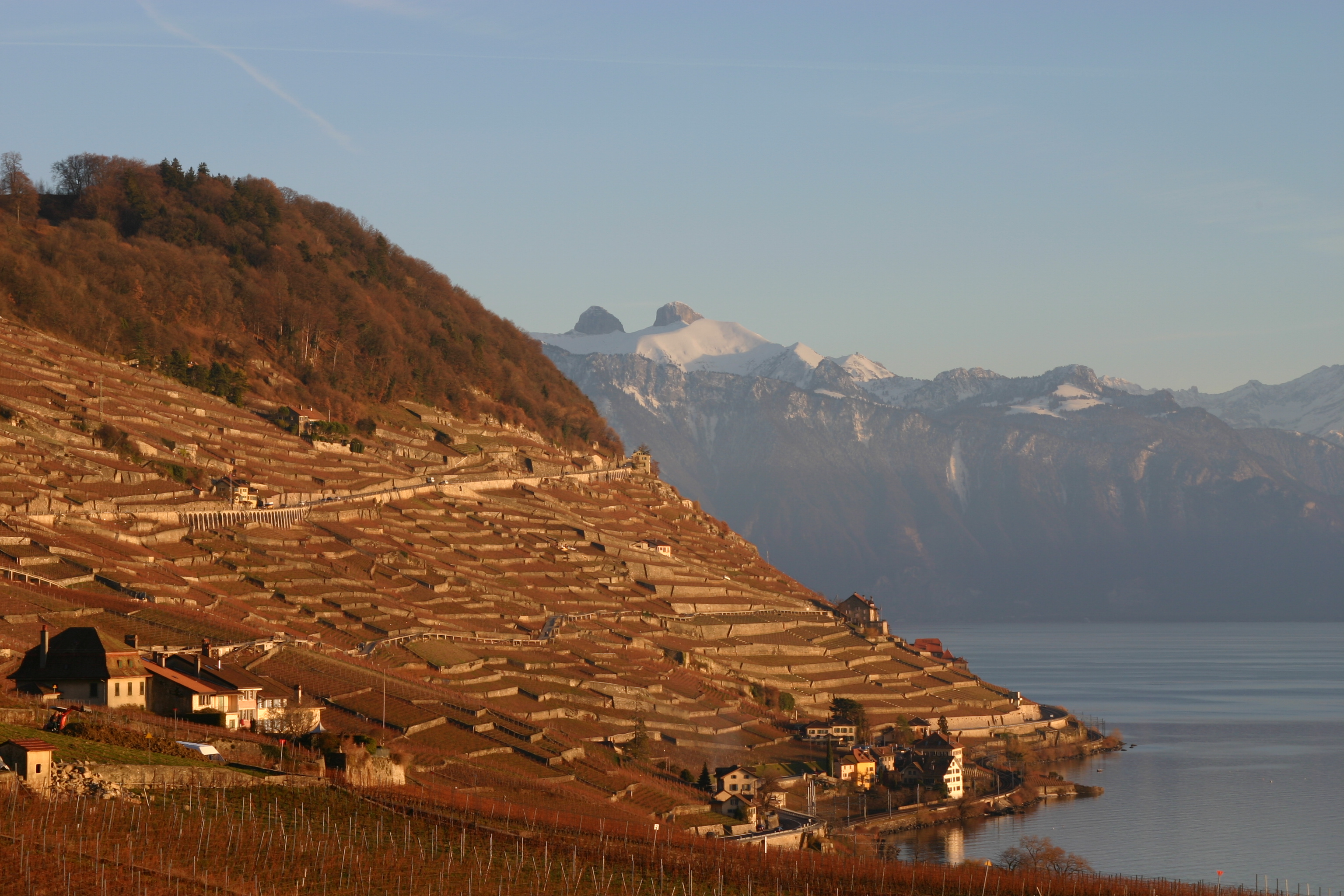
Vine yards at Epesses

Aerial view (1949)

Epesses is located at 464 m (1,522 ft) above sea level, 10 km (6.2 mi) east-southeast of the capital of the canton of Lausanne (as the crow flies). The village is located on a small flat surfaces on steep slopes amid the vineyards of Lavaux on the slopes of Mont de Gourze in a scenic location about 80 m (260 ft) above the lake level of Lake Geneva.

Epesses has an area, as of 2009, of 1.59 square kilometres (0.61 sq mi). Of this area, 1 km^{2} (0.39 sq mi) or 62.9% is used for agricultural purposes, while 0.47 km^{2} (0.18 sq mi) or 29.6% is forested. Of the rest of the land, 0.13 km^{2} (32 acres) or 8.2% is settled (buildings or roads), 0.02 km^{2} (4.9 acres) or 1.3% is either rivers or lakes and 0.01 km^{2} (2.5 acres) or 0.6% is unproductive land.

Of the built up area, housing and buildings made up 1.3% and transportation infrastructure made up 6.9%. Out of the forested land, all of the forested land area is covered with heavy forests. Of the agricultural land, 3.8% is used for growing crops and 23.9% is pastures, while 35.2% is used for orchards or vine crops. All the water in the municipality is in lakes.

The municipality was part of the Lavaux District until it was dissolved on 31 August 2006, and Epesses became part of the new district of Lavaux-Oron.

The area is small and covers a section of the Lavaux at the northeastern shore of Lake Geneva for 700 m (2,300 ft). The municipal land extends northward from the shore of Geneva up the steep slope and down to the wooded heights to the east of Mont de Gourze. The slope is drained by the Enfer River into Lake Geneva. The highest point, Bois de Romont is 864 m (2,835 ft) above sea level.

Epesses consists of the village, the two hamlets Crêt-Dessus (459 m (1,506 ft) above sea level) and Crêt-Lingerie (432 m (1,417 ft) above sea level), located respectively on the Enfer, and a few detached farms. Epesses borders the municipalities of Cully, Riex, Forel and Puidoux.

== Coat of arms ==
The blazon of the municipal coat of arms is Per bend Argent and Gules, overall three Pine-trees Vert.

== Demographics ==
Epesses has a population (as of 2009) of 332. As of 2008, 17.3% of the population are resident foreign nationals. Over the last 10 years (1999–2009 ) the population has changed at a rate of 3.1%. It has changed at a rate of -5.9% due to migration and at a rate of 9% due to births and deaths.

Most of the population (as of 2000) speaks French (273 or 88.6%), with German being second most common (10 or 3.2%) and Portuguese being third (10 or 3.2%). There are 5 people who speak Italian.

Of the population in the municipality 117 or about 38.0% were born in Epesses and lived there in 2000. There were 99 or 32.1% who were born in the same canton, while 31 or 10.1% were born somewhere else in Switzerland, and 55 or 17.9% were born outside of Switzerland.

In 2008 there were 5 live births to Swiss citizens and 1 death of a Swiss citizen. Ignoring immigration and emigration, the population of Swiss citizens increased by 4 while the foreign population remained the same. At the same time, there were 7 non-Swiss men and 11 non-Swiss women who immigrated from another country to Switzerland. The total Swiss population change in 2008 (from all sources, including moves across municipal borders) was an increase of 3 and the non-Swiss population increased by 18 people. This represents a population growth rate of 6.7%.

The age distribution, as of 2009, in Epesses is; 35 children or 10.6% of the population are between 0 and 9 years old and 39 teenagers or 11.8% are between 10 and 19. Of the adult population, 36 people or 10.9% of the population are between 20 and 29 years old. 57 people or 17.2% are between 30 and 39, 55 people or 16.6% are between 40 and 49, and 39 people or 11.8% are between 50 and 59. The senior population distribution is 25 people or 7.6% of the population are between 60 and 69 years old, 30 people or 9.1% are between 70 and 79, there are 11 people or 3.3% who are between 80 and 89, and there are 4 people or 1.2% who are 90 and older.

As of 2000, there were 137 people who were single and never married in the municipality. There were 137 married individuals, 18 widows or widowers and 16 individuals who are divorced.

As of 2000 the average number of residents per living room was 0.53 which is fewer people per room than the cantonal average of 0.61 per room. In this case, a room is defined as space of a housing unit of at least 4 m^{2} (40 sq ft) as normal bedrooms, dining rooms, living rooms, kitchens and habitable cellars and attics. About 39.2% of the total households were owner occupied, or in other words did not pay rent (though they may have a mortgage or a rent-to-own agreement).

As of 2000, there were 131 private households in the municipality, and an average of 2.3 persons per household. There were 47 households that consist of only one person and 6 households with five or more people. Out of a total of 134 households that answered this question, 35.1% were households made up of just one person and there were 2 adults who lived with their parents. Of the rest of the households, there are 32 married couples without children, 41 married couples with children There were 8 single parents with a child or children. There was 1 household that was made up of unrelated people and 3 households that were made up of some sort of institution or another collective housing.

In 2000 there were 43 single family homes (or 39.4% of the total) out of a total of 109 inhabited buildings. There were 18 multi-family buildings (16.5%), along with 41 multi-purpose buildings that were mostly used for housing (37.6%) and 7 other use buildings (commercial or industrial) that also had some housing (6.4%). Of the single family homes 21 were built before 1919, while 1 was built between 1990 and 2000. The most multi-family homes (11) were built before 1919 and the next most (2) were built between 1919 and 1945.

In 2000 there were 164 apartments in the municipality. The most common apartment size was 3 rooms of which there were 36. There were 12 single room apartments and 58 apartments with five or more rooms. Of these apartments, a total of 125 apartments (76.2% of the total) were permanently occupied, while 28 apartments (17.1%) were seasonally occupied and 11 apartments (6.7%) were empty. As of 2009, the construction rate of new housing units was 0 new units per 1000 residents. The vacancy rate for the municipality, in 2010, was 1.8%.

The historical population is given in the following chart:

== Economy ==
Most of the houses in the village center are occupied by tenants who cultivate the 52 hectares of vineyards in this municipality. The cultivation of grapes and wine production now forms the main livelihood. It produces dry white wines, mainly from the Chasselas grape variety, but also reds (Pinot Noir, Syrah, etc.) and specialties. Notable vineyards exist at "Calamine" which is south of the village center by Lake Geneva and "Le Dézaley" in the east, already partly located in the communities of Puidoux and Rivaz.

As of 2010, Epesses had an unemployment rate of 2.4%. As of 2008, there were 84 people employed in the primary economic sector and about 20 businesses involved in this sector. 24 people were employed in the secondary sector and there were 4 businesses in this sector. 64 people were employed in the tertiary sector, with 8 businesses in this sector. There were 168 residents of the municipality who were employed in some capacity, of which females made up 40.5% of the workforce.

In 2008 the total number of full-time equivalent jobs was 124. The number of jobs in the primary sector was 54, all of which were in agriculture. The number of jobs in the secondary sector was 23 of which 22 or (95.7%) were in manufacturing and 1 was in construction. The number of jobs in the tertiary sector was 47. In the tertiary sector; 34 or 72.3% were in the sale or repair of motor vehicles, 6 or 12.8% were in a hotel or restaurant, 1 was in the information industry, 3 or 6.4% were technical professionals or scientists, 1 was in education.

In 2000, there were 42 workers who commuted into the municipality and 94 workers who commuted away. The municipality is a net exporter of workers, with about 2.2 workers leaving the municipality for every one entering. Of the working population, 11.3% used public transportation to get to work, and 50% used a private car.

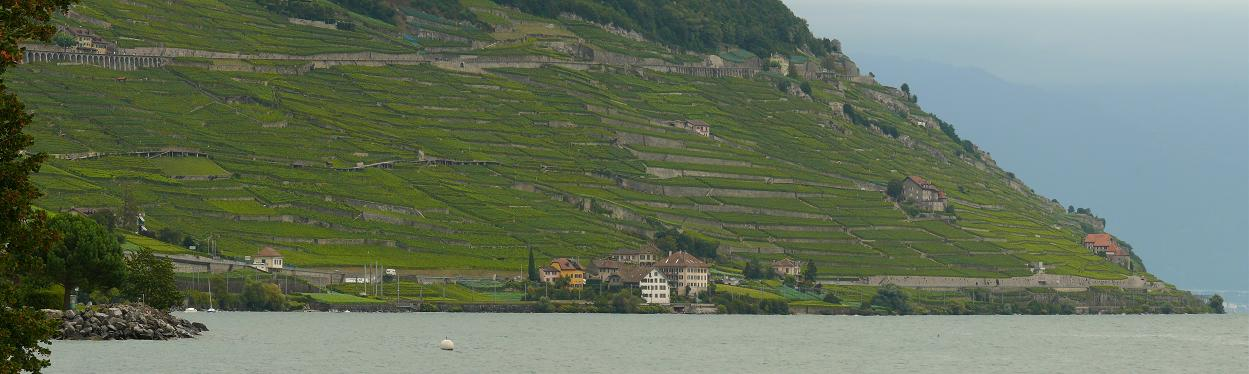
View from the lake

== Politics ==
In the 2007 federal election the most popular party was the FDP which received 33.68% of the vote. The next three most popular parties were the Green Party (14.93%), the SVP (12.68%) and the LPS Party (12.29%). In the federal election, a total of 118 votes were cast, and the voter turnout was 52.9%.

== Transport ==
Although the municipality is located outside of the more urban areas of the district, it still has well-developed transport links with a link road from Cully to Chexbres. The nearest motorway junction is the A9 road which was opened in 1974 to connect Lausanne with Sion and crosses Chexbres, about 3 km from Epesses.

On 2 April 1861, a railway station was established on the Lausanne-Villeneuve. There is also a daily bus service which serves the route from Cully to Chexbres.

== Sights ==
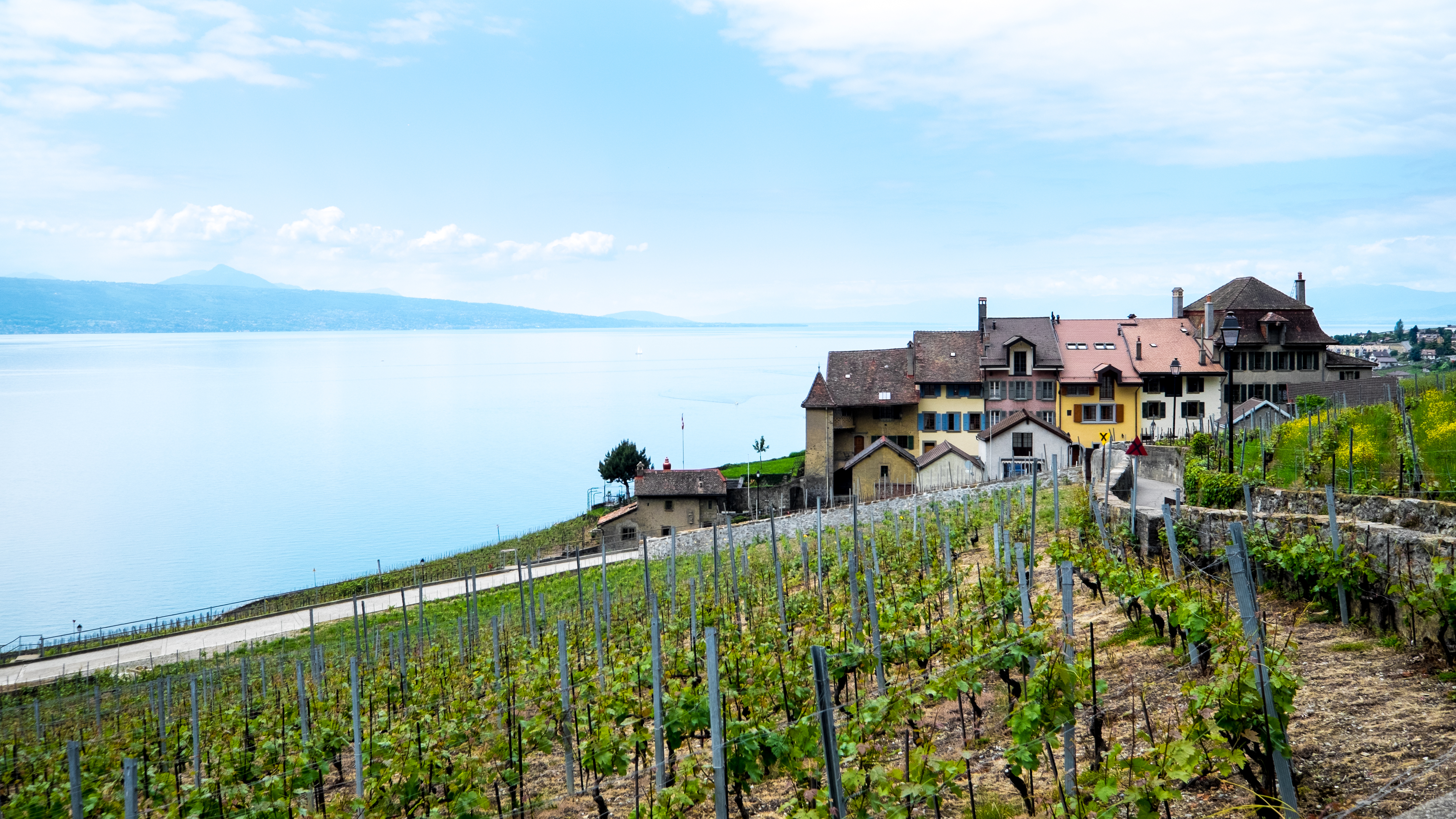
A densely packed wine grower village close to the village of Epesses

Epesses contains part of the UNESCO World Heritage Site: Lavaux, Vineyard Terraces.

The entire village of Epesses is designated as part of the Inventory of Swiss Heritage Sites.

Epesses villages has some densely packed wine growers houses, mostly dating from the 17th to 19th century, offering a picturesque townscape. The Saint-Jacques Church in Epesses is dated from the 14th to the 16th century and has been restored several times since then. The Bovard century, dated to the 15th century is a listed building.

== Twin town ==
Epesses is twinned with the town of Berthoud, Switzerland.

== Religion ==
From the 2000 census, 71 or 23.1% were Roman Catholic, while 163 or 52.9% belonged to the Swiss Reformed Church. Of the rest of the population, there were 9 members of an Orthodox church (or about 2.92% of the population), and there was 1 individual who belongs to another Christian church. There was 1 person who was Buddhist and 1 individual who belonged to another church. 44 (or about 14.29% of the population) belonged to no church, are agnostic or atheist, and 18 individuals (or about 5.84% of the population) did not answer the question.

== Education ==
In Epesses about 94 or (30.5%) of the population have completed non-mandatory upper secondary education, and 53 or (17.2%) have completed additional higher education (either University or a Fachhochschule). Of the 53 who completed tertiary schooling, 58.5% were Swiss men, 20.8% were Swiss women and 13.2% were non-Swiss women.

In the 2009/2010 school year there were a total of 39 students in the Epesses school district. In the Vaud cantonal school system, two years of non-obligatory pre-school are provided by the political districts. During the school year, the political district provided pre-school care for a total of 665 children of which 232 children (34.9%) received subsidized pre-school care. The canton's primary school program requires students to attend for four years. There were 21 students in the municipal primary school program. The obligatory lower secondary school program lasts for six years and there were 18 students in those schools.

As of 2000, there were 20 students in Epesses who came from another municipality, while 48 residents attended schools outside the municipality.
