= Villette, Vaud =

Villette
- Former municipality
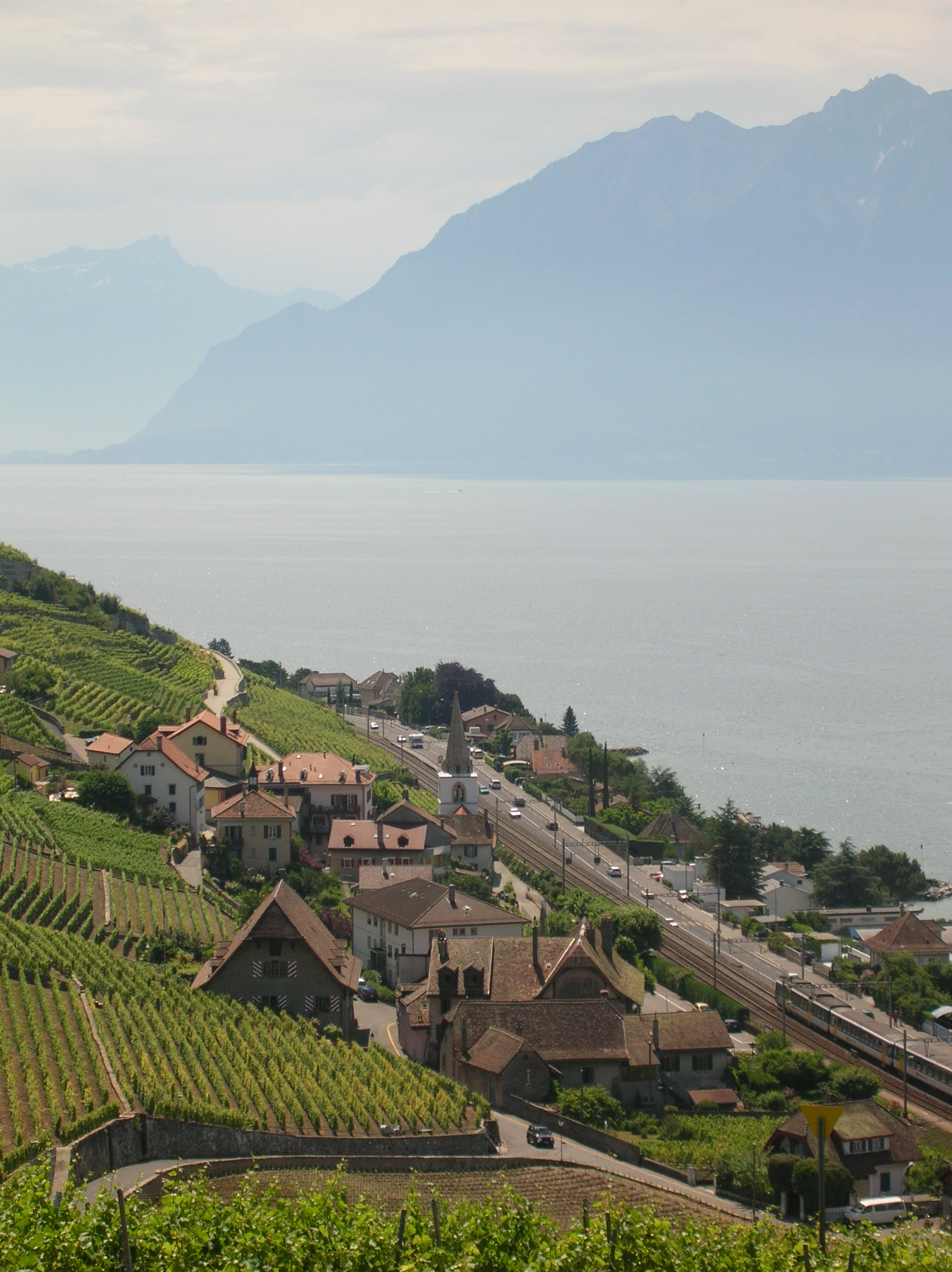
- Villette village

- Coat of arms
- Location of Villette
- Location within Switzerland Location within Canton of Vaud
- Coordinates: 46°29′N 6°42′E
- Country: Switzerland
- Canton: Vaud
- District: Lavaux-Oron

Government
  - Mayor: Jean-Pierre HAENNI

Area
  - Total: 1.37 km^{2} (0.53 sq mi)
- Elevation: 467 m (1,532 ft)

Population (2009)
  - Total: 593
  - Density: 433/km^{2} (1,120/sq mi)
- Demonym: Lè z'Aragne
- Time zone: UTC+01:00 (CET)
  - Summer (DST): UTC+02:00 (CEST)
- Postal code: 1091
- SFOS number: 5612
- ISO 3166 code: CH-VD
- Surrounded by: Forel (Lavaux), Grandvaux, Lugrin (FR-74), Lutry, Meillerie (FR-74), Savigny
- Website: www.villette.ch

Villette is a former municipality in the Swiss canton of Vaud, located in the district of Lavaux-Oron.

The municipalities of Cully, Epesses, Grandvaux, Riex and Villette (Lavaux) merged on 1 July 2011 into the new municipality of Bourg-en-Lavaux.

== Geography ==
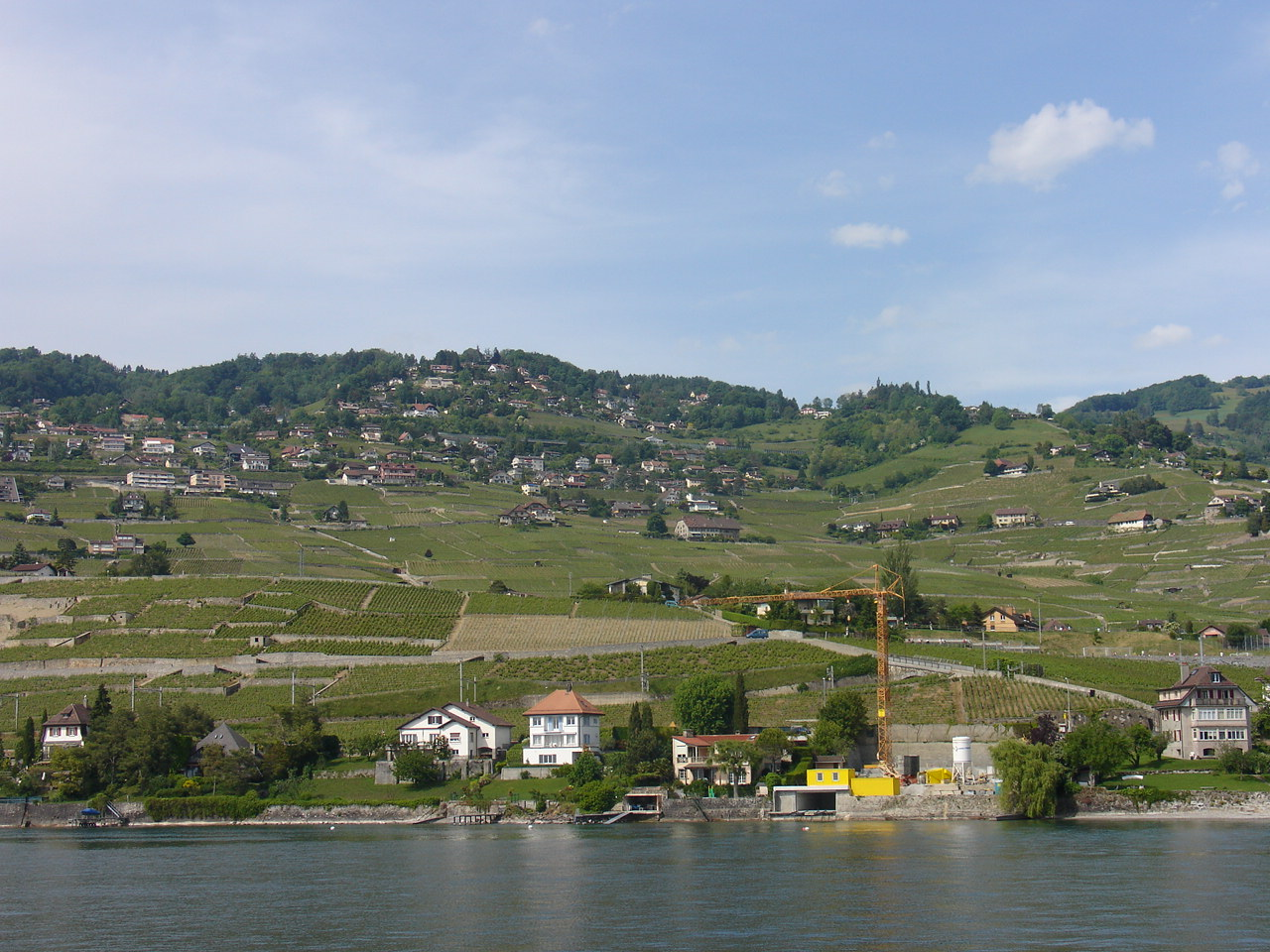
Villette village

Aerial view (1948)

Villette has an area, as of 2009, of 1.37 square kilometres (0.53 mi^{2}). Of this area, 0.95 km^{2} (0.37 mi^{2}) or 69.3% is used for agricultural purposes, while 0.02 km^{2} (0.0077 mi^{2}) or 1.5% is forested. Of the rest of the land, 0.39 km^{2} (0.15 mi^{2}) or 28.5% is settled (buildings or roads), 0.03 km^{2} (7.4 acres) or 2.2% is either rivers or lakes.

Of the built up area, housing and buildings made up 11.7% and transportation infrastructure made up 14.6%. while parks, green belts and sports fields made up 1.5%. Out of the forested land, 0.0% of the total land area is heavily forested and 1.5% is covered with orchards or small clusters of trees. Of the agricultural land, 29.2% is used for growing crops and 6.6% is pastures, while 33.6% is used for orchards or vine crops. All the water in the municipality is in lakes.

The municipality was part of the Lavaux District until it was dissolved on 31 August 2006, and Villette became part of the new district of Lavaux-Oron.

== Coat of arms ==
The blazon of the municipal coat of arms is Per fess Argent and Gules, a Vine counterchanged, leaved Vert.

== Demographics ==
Villette has a population (as of 2009) of 593. As of 2008, 18.0% of the population are resident foreign nationals. Over the last 10 years (1999–2009 ) the population has changed at a rate of 5%. It has changed at a rate of 1.8% due to migration and at a rate of 1.4% due to births and deaths.

Most of the population (as of 2000) speaks French (499 or 88.5%), with German being second most common (26 or 4.6%) and English being third (11 or 2.0%). There are 8 people who speak Italian.

Of the population in the municipality 134 or about 23.8% were born in Villette and lived there in 2000. There were 215 or 38.1% who were born in the same canton, while 93 or 16.5% were born somewhere else in Switzerland, and 113 or 20.0% were born outside of Switzerland.

In 2008 there were 4 live births to Swiss citizens and 1 birth to non-Swiss citizens, and in same time span there were 4 deaths of Swiss citizens. Ignoring immigration and emigration, the population of Swiss citizens remained the same while the foreign population increased by 1. There were 2 Swiss men who emigrated from Switzerland. At the same time, there was 1 non-Swiss man who emigrated from Switzerland to another country and 1 non-Swiss woman who immigrated from another country to Switzerland. The total Swiss population change in 2008 (from all sources, including moves across municipal borders) was a decrease of 13 and the non-Swiss population increased by 12 people. This represents a population growth rate of -0.2%. The age distribution of the population (as of 2000) is children and teenagers (0–19 years old) make up 24.8% of the population, while adults (20–64 years old) make up 61.2% and seniors (over 64 years old) make up 14%.

As of 2000, there were 235 people who were single and never married in the municipality. There were 287 married individuals, 18 widows or widowers and 24 individuals who are divorced.

As of 2000 the average number of residents per living room was 0.53 which is fewer people per room than the cantonal average of 0.61 per room. In this case, a room is defined as space of a housing unit of at least 4 m^{2} (40 ft^{2}) as normal bedrooms, dining rooms, living rooms, kitchens and habitable cellars and attics. About 52.4% of the total households were owner-occupied, or in other words did not pay rent (though they may have a mortgage or a rent-to-own agreement).

As of 2000, there were 217 private households in the municipality, and an average of 2.6 persons per household. There were 48 households that consist of only one person and 22 households with five or more people. Out of a total of 221 households that answered this question, 21.7% were households made up of just one person and there were 4 adults who lived with their parents. Of the rest of the households, there are 68 married couples without children, 78 married couples with children There were 15 single parents with a child or children. There were 4 households that were made up of unrelated people and 4 households that were made up of some sort of institution or another collective housing.

In 2000 there were 95 single-family homes (or 55.9% of the total) out of a total of 170 inhabited buildings. There were 24 multi-family buildings (14.1%), along with 43 multi-purpose buildings that were mostly used for housing (25.3%) and 8 other use buildings (commercial or industrial) that also had some housing (4.7%). Of the single-family homes 19 were built before 1919, while 12 were built between 1990 and 2000. The greatest number of single-family homes (21) were built between 1919 and 1945. The most multi-family homes (10) were built before 1919 and the next most (7) were built between 1961 and 1970.

In 2000 there were 235 apartments in the municipality. The most common apartment size was 5 rooms of which there were 53. There were 5 single-room apartments and 115 apartments with five or more rooms. Of these apartments, a total of 206 apartments (87.7% of the total) were permanently occupied, while 21 apartments (8.9%) were seasonally occupied and 8 apartments (3.4%) were empty. As of 2009, the construction rate of new housing units was 0 new units per 1000 residents. The vacancy rate for the municipality, in 2010, was 0%.

The historical population is given in the following chart:

== Heritage sites of national significance ==
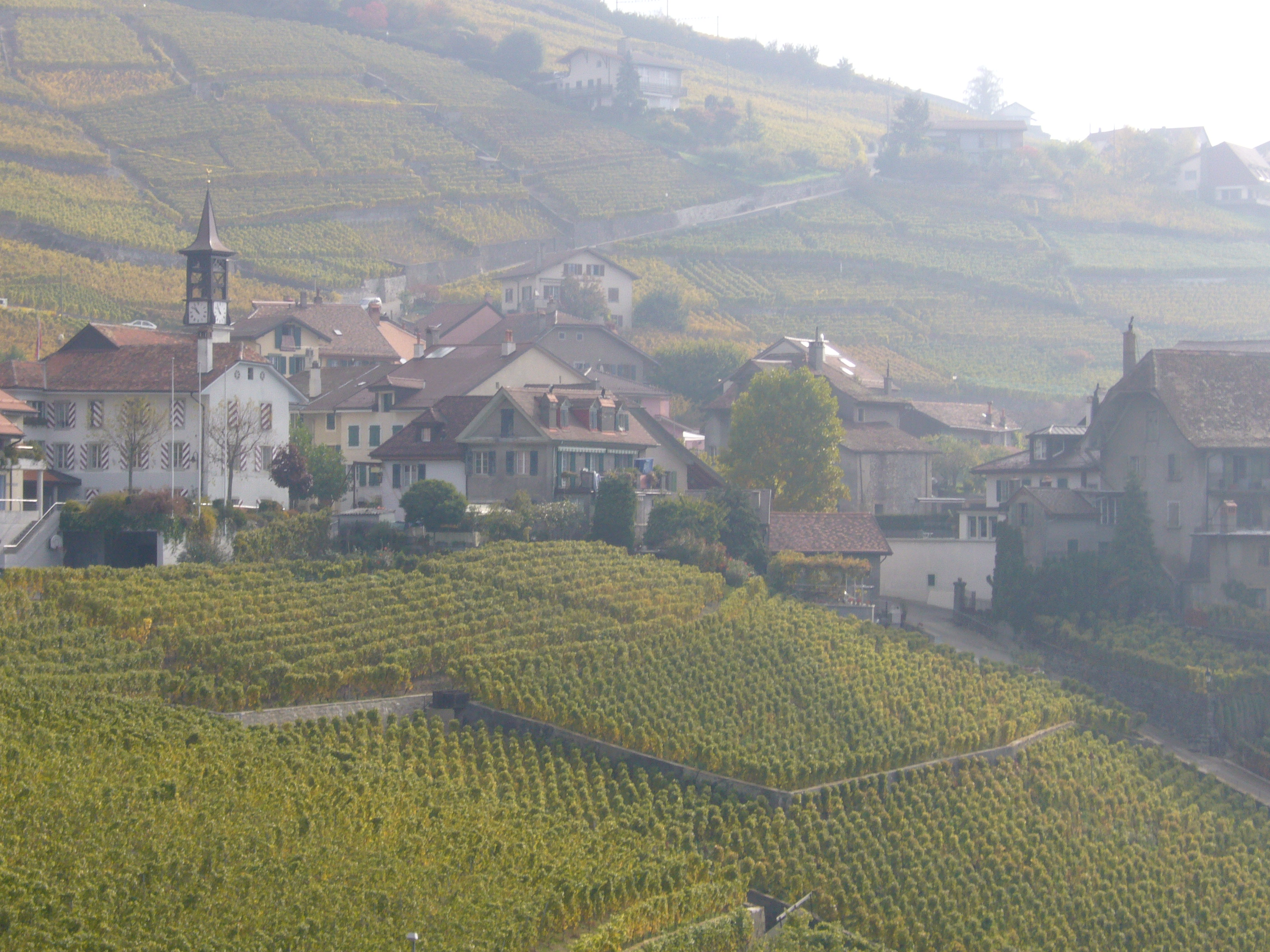
Aran village

The municipality contains part of the UNESCO World Heritage Site: Lavaux, Vineyard Terraces which is also listed as a Swiss heritage site of national significance. The entire village of Aran is part of the Inventory of Swiss Heritage Sites.

== Politics ==
In the 2007 federal election the most popular party was the SVP which received 20.84% of the vote. The next three most popular parties were the FDP (19.9%), the LPS Party (15.23%) and the SP (12.82%). In the federal election, a total of 238 votes were cast, and the voter turnout was 62.5%.

== Economy ==
As of 2010, Villette had an unemployment rate of 1%. As of 2008, there were 45 people employed in the primary economic sector and about 16 businesses involved in this sector. 9 people were employed in the secondary sector and there were 4 businesses in this sector. 85 people were employed in the tertiary sector, with 14 businesses in this sector. There were 282 residents of the municipality who were employed in some capacity, of which females made up 40.4% of the workforce.

In 2008 the total number of full-time equivalent jobs was 108. The number of jobs in the primary sector was 35, all of which were in agriculture. The number of jobs in the secondary sector was 8 of which 3 or (37.5%) were in manufacturing and 5 (62.5%) were in construction. The number of jobs in the tertiary sector was 65. In the tertiary sector; 4 or 6.2% were in the sale or repair of motor vehicles, 1 was in the movement and storage of goods, 49 or 75.4% were in a hotel or restaurant, 2 or 3.1% were the insurance or financial industry, 2 or 3.1% were technical professionals or scientists, 2 or 3.1% were in education.

In 2000, there were 42 workers who commuted into the municipality and 216 workers who commuted away. The municipality is a net exporter of workers, with about 5.1 workers leaving the municipality for every one entering. About 9.5% of the workforce coming into Villette are coming from outside Switzerland. Of the working population, 13.5% used public transportation to get to work, and 63.5% used a private car.

== Religion ==
From the 2000 census, 152 or 27.0% were Roman Catholic, while 272 or 48.2% belonged to the Swiss Reformed Church. Of the rest of the population, there were 2 members of an Orthodox church (or about 0.35% of the population), and there were 51 individuals (or about 9.04% of the population) who belonged to another Christian church. There was 1 individual who was Islamic. There was 1 person who was Buddhist. 99 (or about 17.55% of the population) belonged to no church, are agnostic or atheist, and 11 individuals (or about 1.95% of the population) did not answer the question.

== Education ==
In Villette about 172 or (30.5%) of the population have completed non-mandatory upper secondary education, and 157 or (27.8%) have completed additional higher education (either University or a Fachhochschule). Of the 157 who completed tertiary schooling, 52.2% were Swiss men, 31.8% were Swiss women, 8.9% were non-Swiss men and 7.0% were non-Swiss women.

As of 2000, there were 23 students in Villette who came from another municipality, while 100 residents attended schools outside the municipality.
