= Cully, Switzerland =

Cully
- Former municipality
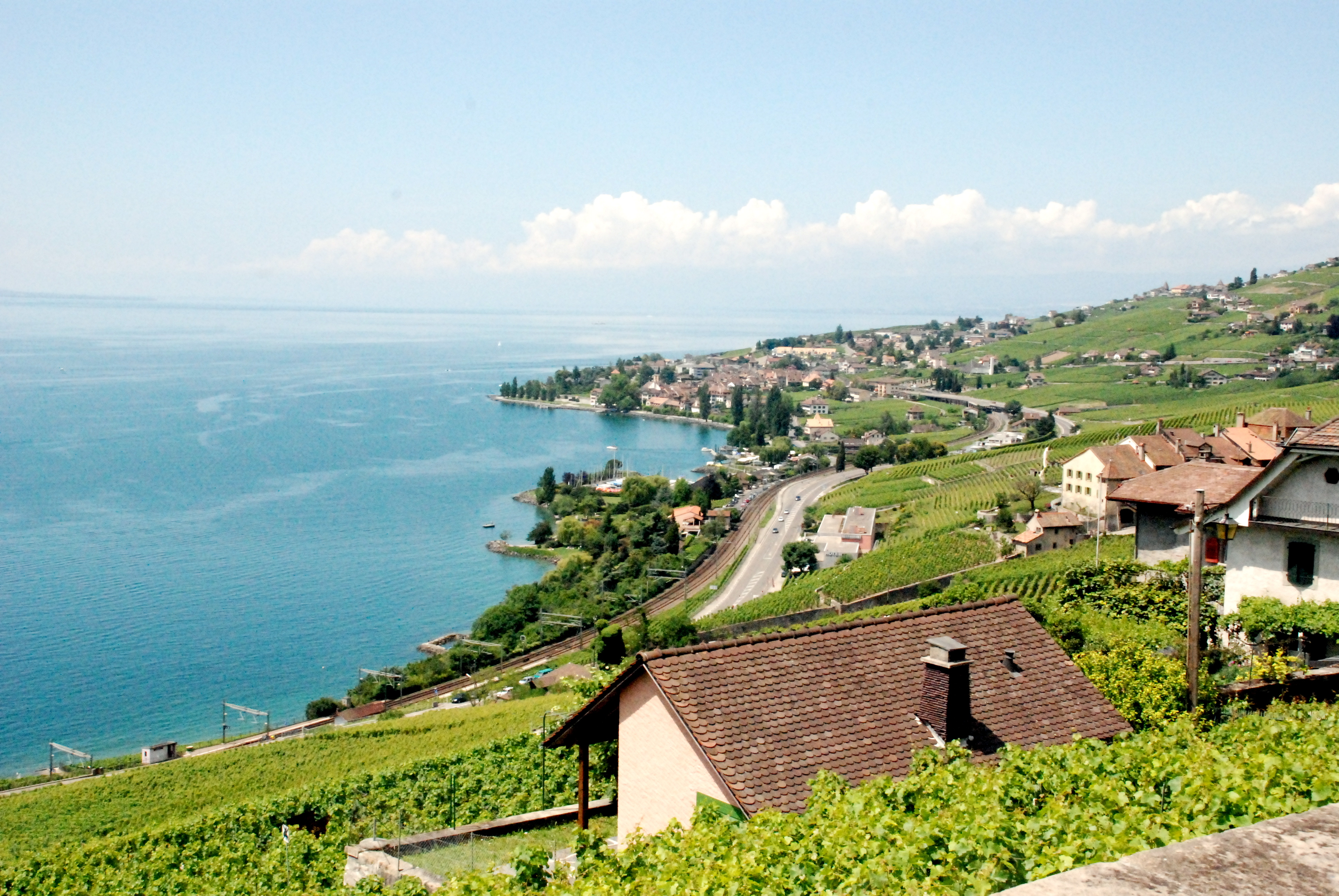

- Coat of arms
- Location of Cully
- Location within Switzerland Location within Canton of Vaud
- Coordinates: 46°29′N 6°43′E
- Country: Switzerland
- Canton: Vaud
- District: Lavaux-Oron

Area
  - Total: 2.38 km^{2} (0.92 sq mi)
- Elevation: 374 m (1,227 ft)

Population (2009)
  - Total: 1,752
  - Density: 736/km^{2} (1,910/sq mi)
- Demonym: Les Culliérans
- Time zone: UTC+01:00 (CET)
  - Summer (DST): UTC+02:00 (CEST)
- Postal code: 1096
- SFOS number: 5602
- ISO 3166 code: CH-VD
- Localities: Treytorrens (Lavaux)
- Surrounded by: Forel (Lavaux), Riex, Epesses, Grandvaux
- Website: www.cully.ch

Cully (French pronunciation: [kyji]) is a former municipality in the Swiss canton of Vaud. It was the capital of the district of Lavaux until 2006 when it became part of the district of Lavaux-Oron. It lies on Lake Geneva.

The municipalities of Cully, Epesses, Grandvaux, Riex and Villette (Lavaux) merged on 1 July 2011 into the new municipality of Bourg-en-Lavaux.

== History ==
Aerial view from 100 m by Walter Mittelholzer (1925)

The earliest traces of human activity in Cully come from the Neolithic, when Lake Geneva was near the modern port of Moratel. During the Roman Empire, the route from Lausanne to Great Saint Bernard ran through the area. From this time, some walls and coins have been found preserved.

The first written mention of the place took place in 967 under the name Cusliacum. Later appeared the names Cusliaco (12th century), Custiacum (1154), Cullie (1226), Cully (1275) and Culyer (1383). The origin of the name is not clearly understood. It is possibly derived from the Roman family name Coclius.

The first document involving Cully, saw it given to the King of Besançon. However, because Cully at the same time was under Villett parishe, which belonged to the bishop of Lausanne, there were constant disputes which led in 1246 to it being given back to the bishop of Lausanne. In the 14th century the inhabitants the acquired the right to hold a weekly market and fortify the village.

With the conquest of Vaud by Bern in 1536, Cully came under the administration of the Bailiwick of Lausanne. After the collapse of the Ancien régime, the village belonged from 1798 to 1803 during the Helvetic Republic to the Canton of Léman. In 1798 Cully Lavaux became the capital of the district, as it was in the central part of the district. It was not until 1824, that Cully attained the status of an independent political community. A project to merge the independent municipalities Cully, Epesses, Riex, Grandvaux, and Villette (Lavaux) failed in a vote on 27 February 2005 due to the resistance of the population of Grandvaux. The project is therefore not being pursued.

== Geography ==
Cully lies at an average altitude of 387 m (1,270 ft), 8 km (5 mi) east-southeast of the canton capital Lausanne as the crow flies. The village is located in the Lavaux, on a slightly projecting outcrop into the Lake Geneva headland, at the foot of the vineyards of Mont de Gourze.

Cully has an area, as of 2009, of 2.38 square kilometers (0.92 sq mi). Of this area, 1.52 km^{2} (0.59 sq mi) or 63.9% is used for agricultural purposes, while 0.22 km^{2} (0.085 sq mi) or 9.2% is forested. Of the rest of the land, 0.64 km^{2} (0.25 sq mi) or 26.9% is settled (buildings or roads), 0.01 km^{2} (2.5 acres) or 0.4% is either rivers or lakes.

Of the built up area, housing and buildings made up 13.9% and transportation infrastructure made up 10.5%. while parks, green belts and sports fields made up 2.1%. Out of the forested land, 7.1% of the total land area is heavily forested and 2.1% is covered with orchards or small clusters of trees. Of the agricultural land, 11.8% is used for growing crops and 16.4% is pastures, while 35.7% is used for orchards or vine crops. All the water in the municipality is flowing water.

The municipality was part of the Lavaux District until it was dissolved on 31 August 2006, and Cully became part of the new district of Lavaux-Oron.

The municipal area covers a section of the Lavaux at the northeastern shore of Lake Geneva. The land extends northward from the shore across the narrow riparian buffer strips and the slopes of the Lavaux, with the eastern boundary runs along the creek "Champaflon" then to the southeast to the Jorat plateau. In the northeast, the area extends to theMont de Gourze, which at 925 m (3,035 ft) is the highest point of Cully. In the area of Cully is the watershed between the catchments of the Rhine and Rhône, 3 kilometres (2 mi) north of Lake Geneva. The extreme north of the municipality is the Broye River leading to the Rhine.

Cully includes the hamlet Chenaux at an altitude of 530 m (1,740 ft) on a ridge in the vineyards above the village and a number of individual farms on the plateau. Surrounded by Cully are Grandvaux, Forel, Riex and Epesses.

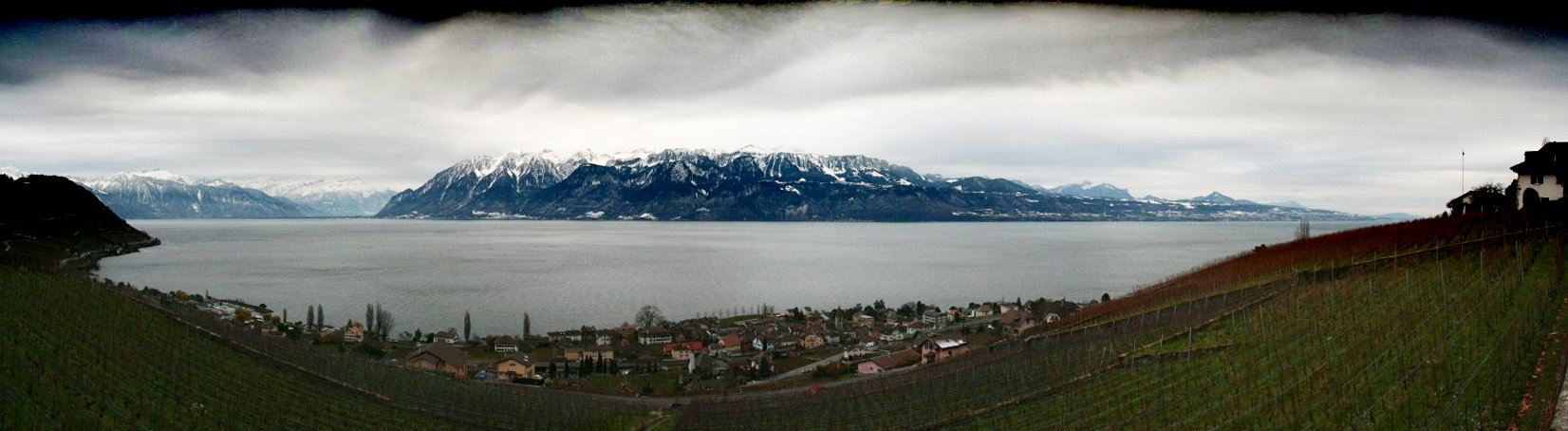

== Coat of arms ==
The blazon of the municipal coat of arms is Per fess Argent and Gules, a Grape Bunch counterchanged.

== Demographics ==
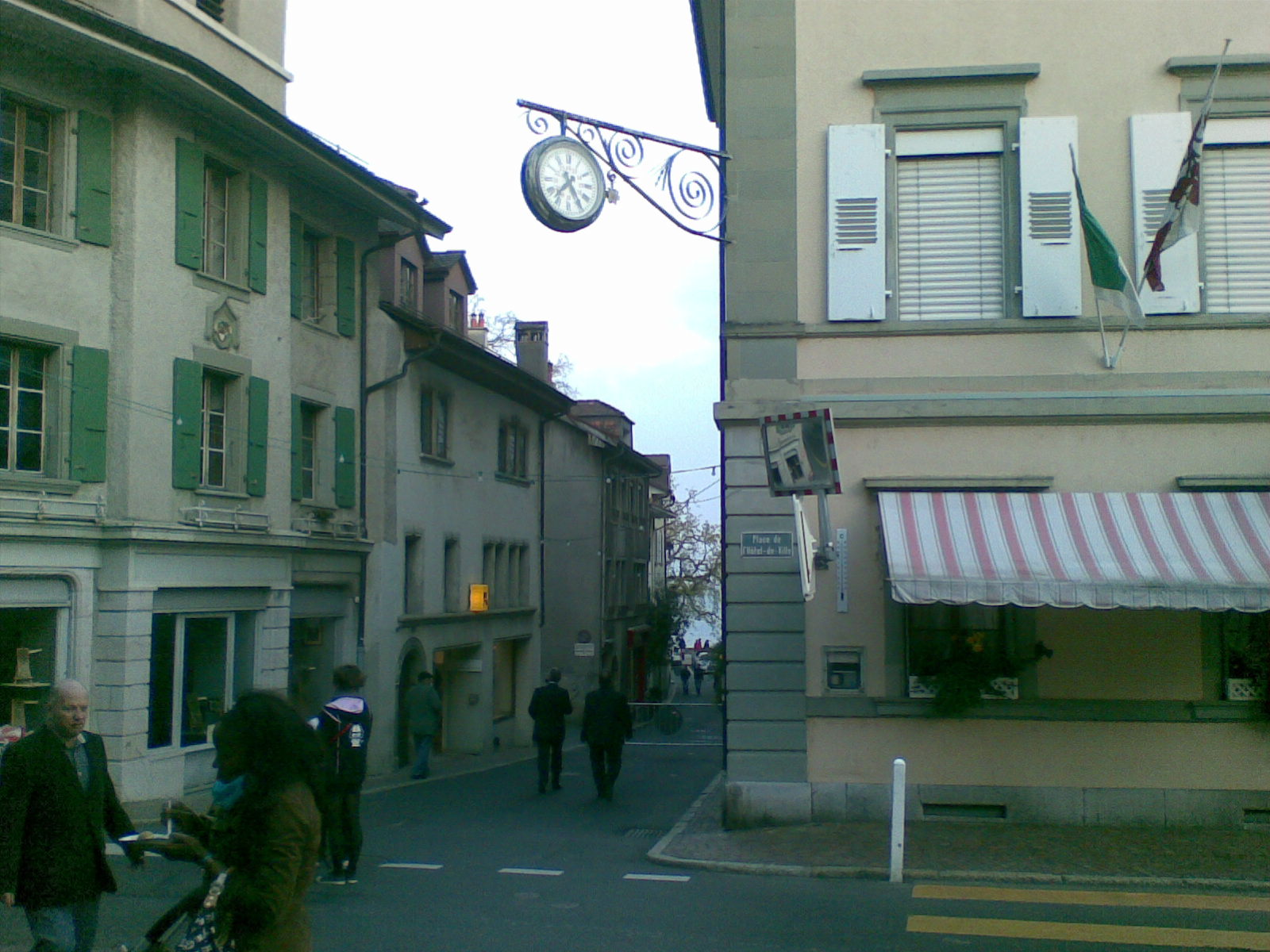
Buildings in Cully

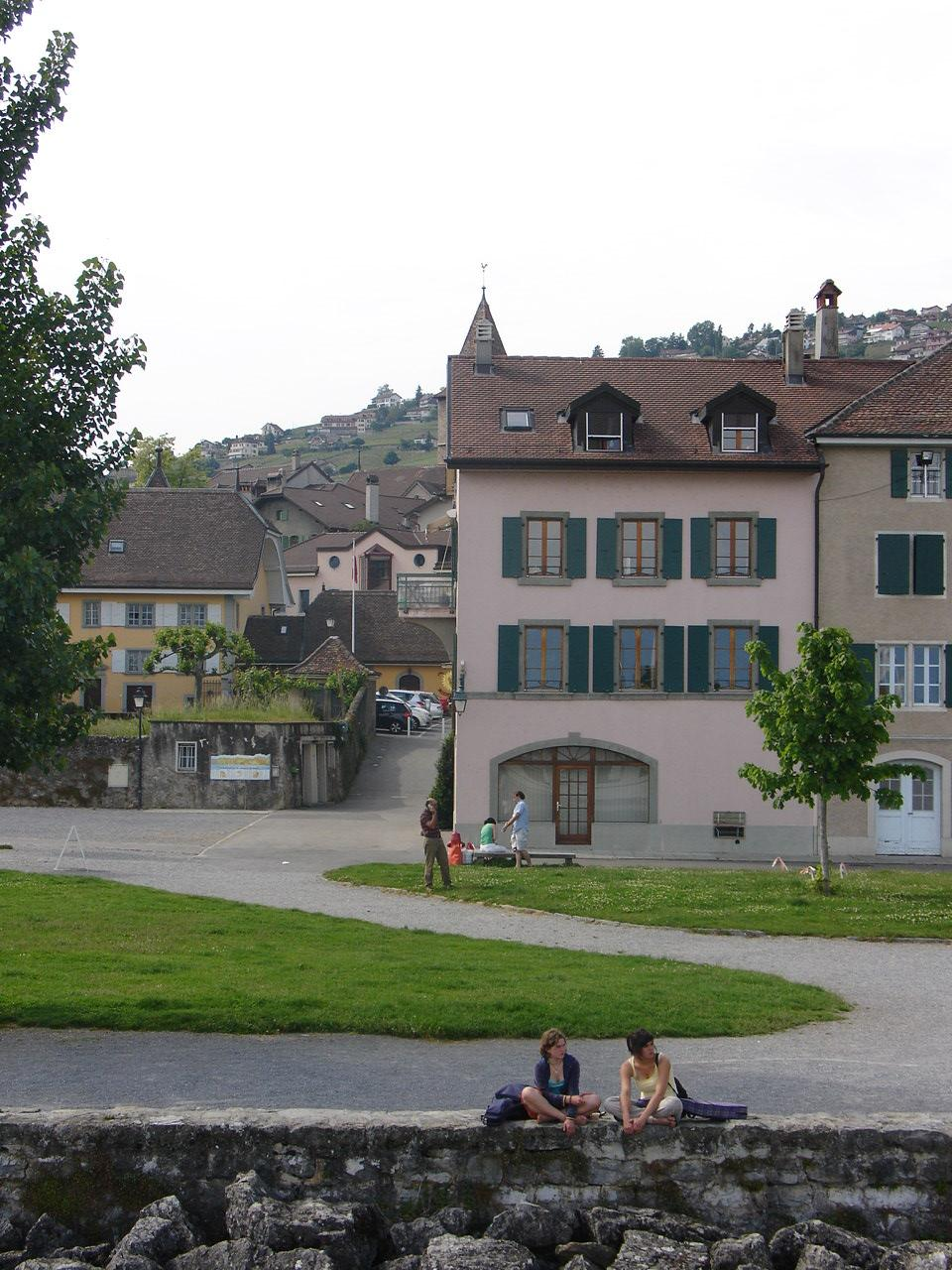
Cully waterfront

Cully has a population (as of 2009) of 1,752. As of 2008, 22.0% of the population are resident foreign nationals. Over the last 10 years (1999–2009 ) the population has changed at a rate of -1.6%. It has changed at a rate of 0.7% due to migration and at a rate of -2% due to births and deaths.

Most of the population (as of 2000) speaks French (1,510 or 84.0%), with German being second most common (99 or 5.5%) and Portuguese being third (77 or 4.3%). There are 32 people who speak Italian.

Of the population in the municipality 414 or about 23.0% were born in Cully and lived there in 2000. There were 612 or 34.0% who were born in the same canton, while 289 or 16.1% were born somewhere else in Switzerland, and 417 or 23.2% were born outside of Switzerland.

In 2008 there were 9 live births to Swiss citizens and 6 births to non-Swiss citizens, and in same time span there were 22 deaths of Swiss citizens and 2 non-Swiss citizen deaths. Ignoring immigration and emigration, the population of Swiss citizens decreased by 13 while the foreign population increased by 4. There were 7 Swiss men and 1 Swiss woman who immigrated back to Switzerland. At the same time, there were 20 non-Swiss men and 11 non-Swiss women who immigrated from another country to Switzerland. The total Swiss population change in 2008 (from all sources, including moves across municipal borders) was an increase of 9 and the non-Swiss population increased by 12 people. This represents a population growth rate of 1.2%.

The age distribution, as of 2009, in Cully is; 166 children or 9.5% of the population are between 0 and 9 years old and 183 teenagers or 10.5% are between 10 and 19. Of the adult population, 167 people or 9.5% of the population are between 20 and 29 years old. 227 people or 13.0% are between 30 and 39, 264 people or 15.1% are between 40 and 49, and 258 people or 14.7% are between 50 and 59. The senior population distribution is 234 people or 13.4% of the population are between 60 and 69 years old, 142 people or 8.1% are between 70 and 79, there are 93 people or 5.3% who are between 80 and 89, and there are 17 people or 1.0% who are 90 and older.

As of 2000, there were 672 people who were single and never married in the municipality. There were 888 married individuals, 122 widows or widowers and 116 individuals who are divorced.

As of 2000 the average number of residents per living room was 0.57 which is about equal to the cantonal average of 0.61 per room. In this case, a room is defined as space of a housing unit of at least 4 m^{2} (40 sq ft) as normal bedrooms, dining rooms, living rooms, kitchens and habitable cellars and attics. About 35.2% of the total households were owner occupied, or in other words did not pay rent (though they may have a mortgage or a rent-to-own agreement).

As of 2000, there were 803 private households in the municipality, and an average of 2.2 persons per household. There were 292 households that consist of only one person and 34 households with five or more people. Out of a total of 821 households that answered this question, 35.6% were households made up of just one person and there were 6 adults who lived with their parents. Of the rest of the households, there are 232 married couples without children, 216 married couples with children There were 45 single parents with a child or children. There were 12 households that were made up of unrelated people and 18 households that were made up of some sort of institution or another collective housing.

In 2000 there were 178 single family homes (or 44.3% of the total) out of a total of 402 inhabited buildings. There were 126 multi-family buildings (31.3%), along with 79 multi-purpose buildings that were mostly used for housing (19.7%) and 19 other use buildings (commercial or industrial) that also had some housing (4.7%). Of the single family homes 47 were built before 1919, while 10 were built between 1990 and 2000. The most multi-family homes (55) were built before 1919 and the next most (21) were built between 1961 and 1970. There were 4 multi-family houses built between 1996 and 2000.

In 2000 there were 956 apartments in the municipality. The most common apartment size was 3 rooms of which there were 254. There were 83 single room apartments and 232 apartments with five or more rooms. Of these apartments, a total of 783 apartments (81.9% of the total) were permanently occupied, while 125 apartments (13.1%) were seasonally occupied and 48 apartments (5.0%) were empty. As of 2009, the construction rate of new housing units was 0 new units per 1000 residents. The vacancy rate for the municipality, in 2010, was 0.1%.

The historical population is given in the following chart:

== Politics ==
In the 2007 federal election the most popular party was the SP which received 20.24% of the vote. The next three most popular parties were the FDP (17.51%), the Green Party (14.86%) and the SVP (13.83%). In the federal election, a total of 601 votes were cast, and the voter turnout was 53.1%.

== Economy ==
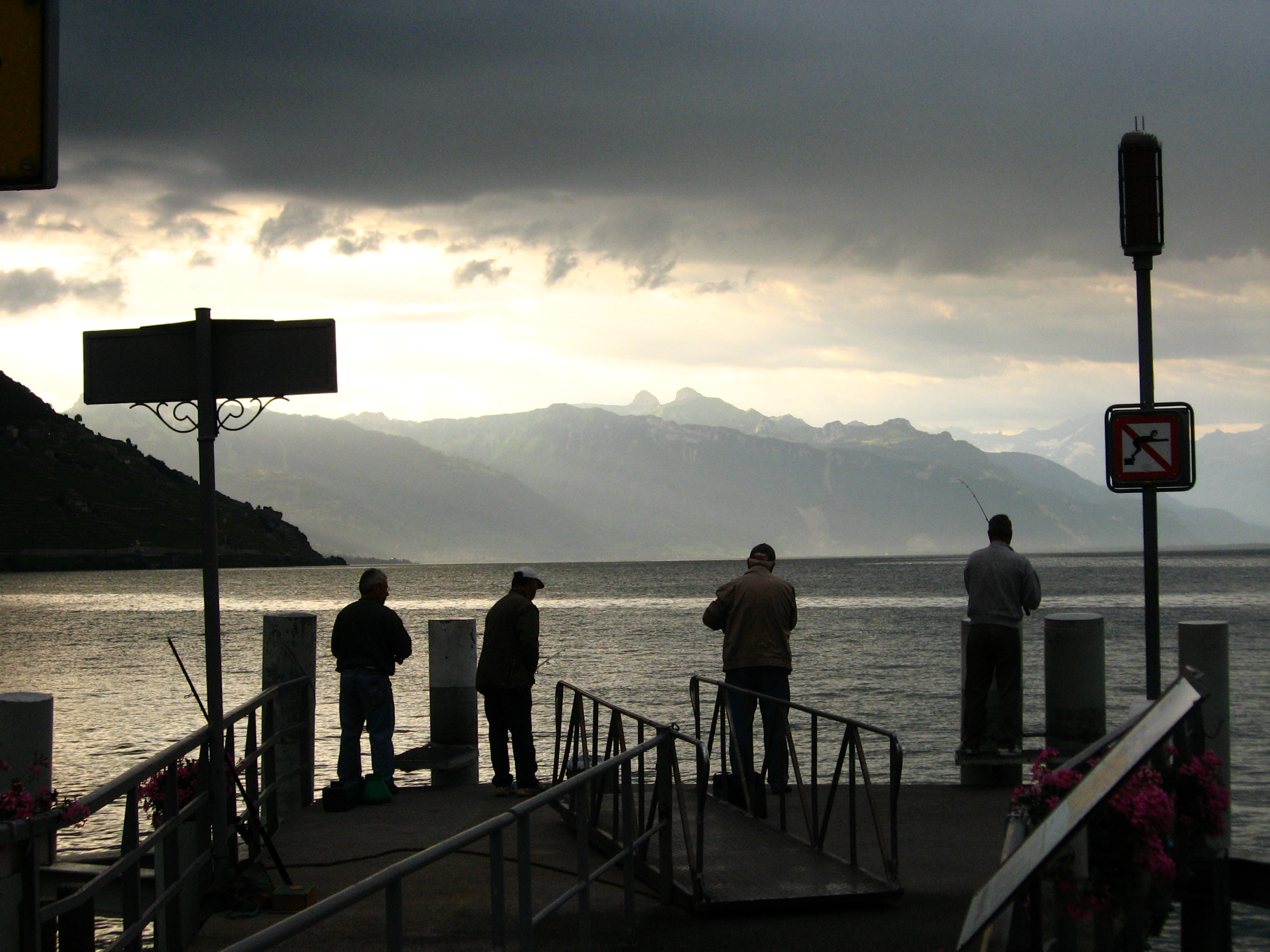
Cully fishing wharf

Cully was, until the beginning of the 20th century, a predominantly agricultural village. Even today, the vineyards on the slopes of the Lavaux account for some 90 hectares and agriculture and livestock on the plateaus is an important factor in the employment structure of the population. 22% of the workforce are currently employed in agriculture, 6% in secondary industry, and the service sector accounts for 72%.

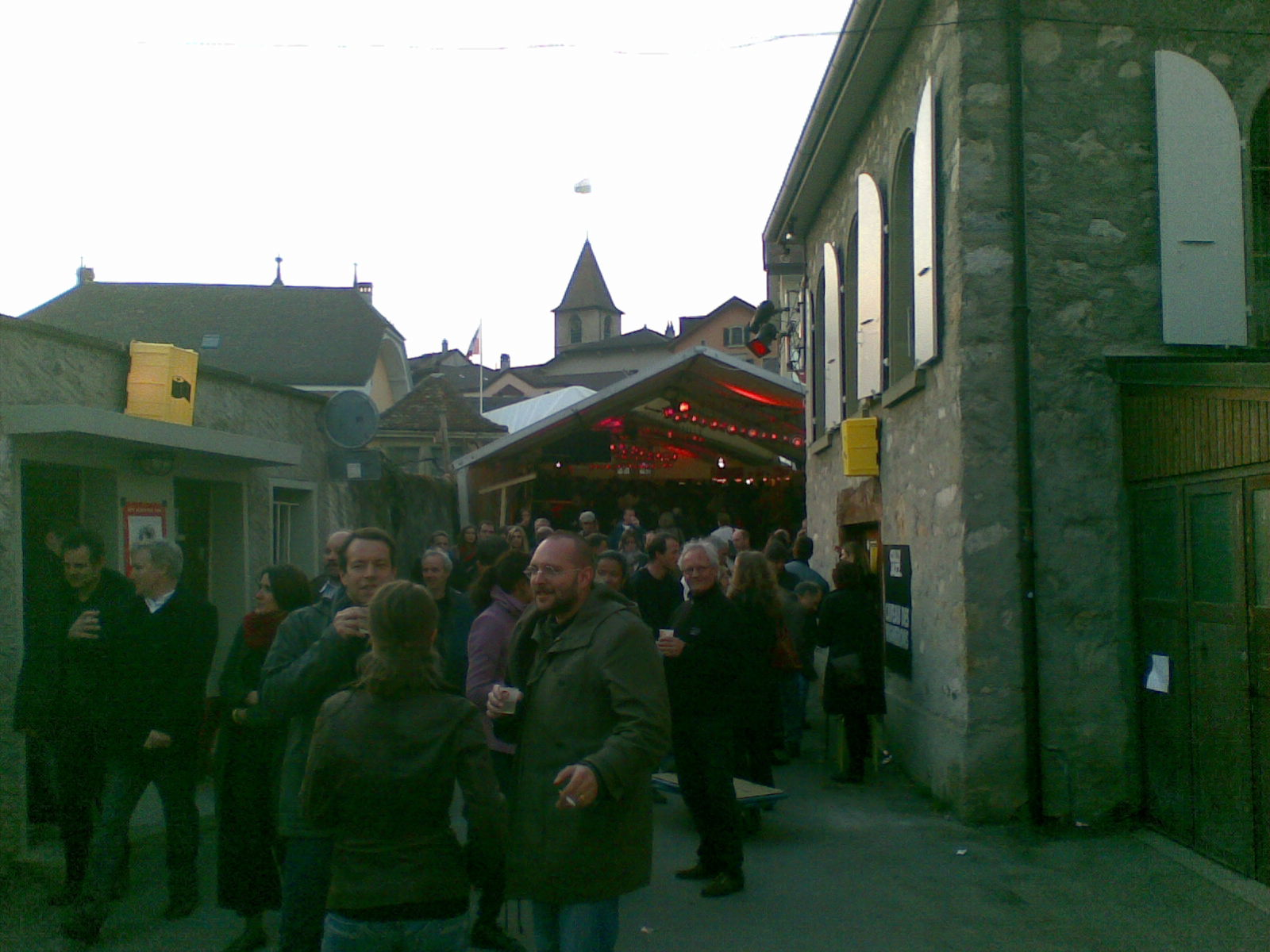
Cully Jazz Festival

The area west of the village has evolved in recent decades, a small commercial and industrial area in which businesses in the construction industry and information technology have grown up. The trade of Cully geared towards convenience goods and tourism and there are many wine shops. East of the village there is a small leisure port and a campground. Every year, the Cully Jazz Festival is held. Thanks to good transport links and an attractive location, the village has in recent decades developed into a residential community. Many workers though are commuters who work mainly in Lausanne and in the Vevey-Montreux region.

As of 2010, Cully had an unemployment rate of 3.5%. As of 2008, there were 91 people employed in the primary economic sector and about 26 businesses involved in this sector. 63 people were employed in the secondary sector and there were 19 businesses in this sector. 624 people were employed in the tertiary sector, with 75 businesses in this sector. There were 932 residents of the municipality who were employed in some capacity, of which females made up 42.5% of the workforce.

In 2008 the total number of full-time equivalent jobs was 608. The number of jobs in the primary sector was 63, of which 61 were in agriculture, 1 was in forestry or lumber production and 1 was in fishing or fisheries. The number of jobs in the secondary sector was 58 of which 22 or (37.9%) were in manufacturing and 32 (55.2%) were in construction. The number of jobs in the tertiary sector was 487. In the tertiary sector; 59 or 12.1% were in the sale or repair of motor vehicles, 3 or 0.6% were in the movement and storage of goods, 80 or 16.4% were in a hotel or restaurant, 2 or 0.4% were in the information industry, 16 or 3.3% were the insurance or financial industry, 21 or 4.3% were technical professionals or scientists, 37 or 7.6% were in education and 201 or 41.3% were in health care.

In 2000, there were 471 workers who commuted into the municipality and 610 workers who commuted away. The municipality is a net exporter of workers, with about 1.3 workers leaving the municipality for every one entering. Of the working population, 15.8% used public transportation to get to work, and 57.4% used a private car.

== Transportation ==
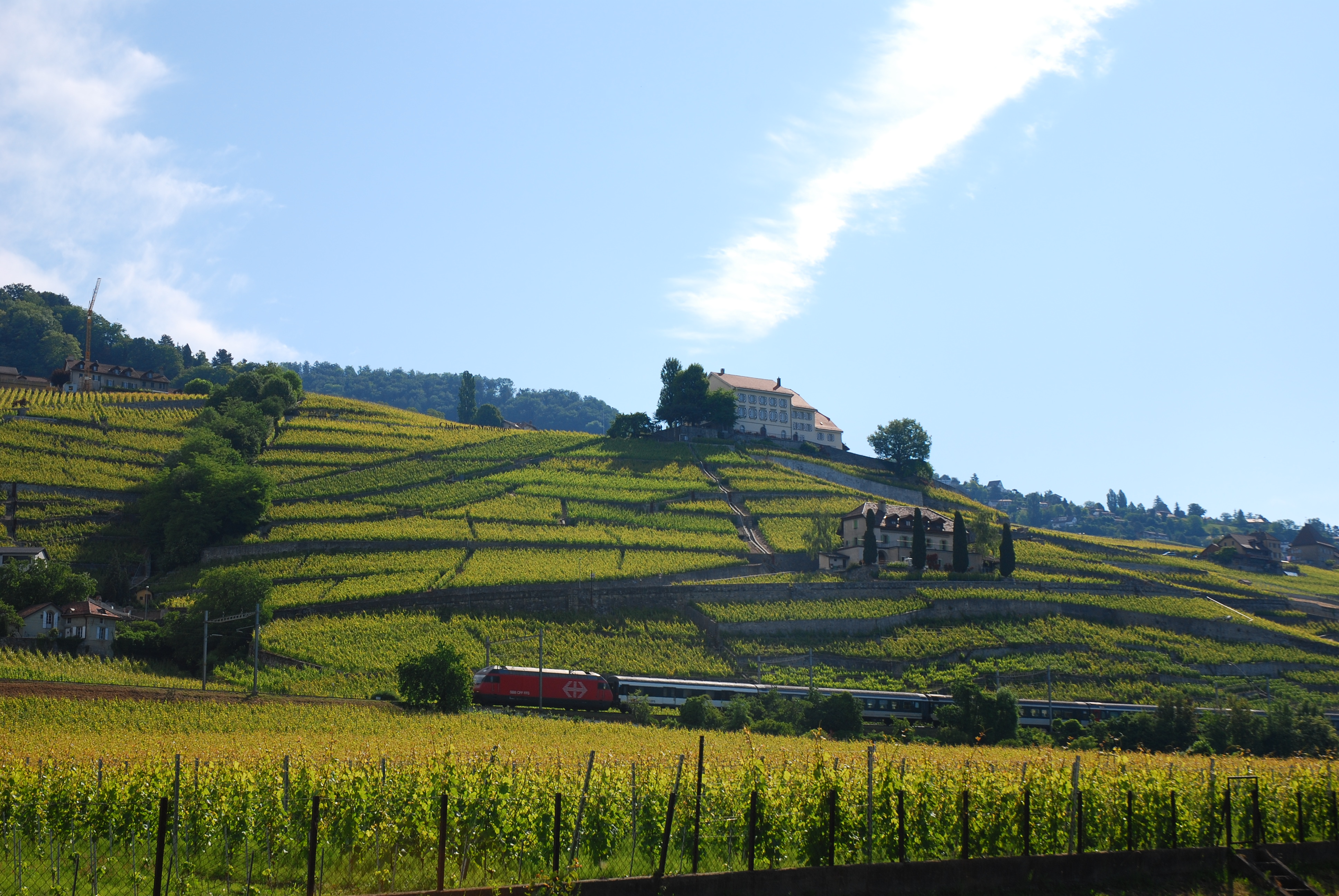
Cully to Lutry railway

The community is well developed. It lies on the main road to Lausanne along Lake Geneva to Vevey (with a local bypass). The nearest motorway connections, built in 1974 is the A9 (Lausanne-Sion), which crosses Belmont (west) and Chexbres (east), each about 6 km (4 mi) from Cully.

On 2 April 1861 a railway station was built in Cully on the Lausanne-Villeneuve section of the railway line from Lausanne to Valais. This station is now part of the RER Vaud commuter train network. Cully also provides a bus service which serves the route from Cully via Chexbres to the station Puidoux-Chexbres. Furthermore, Cully is also connected by boating on Lake Geneva.

== Heritage sites of national significance ==
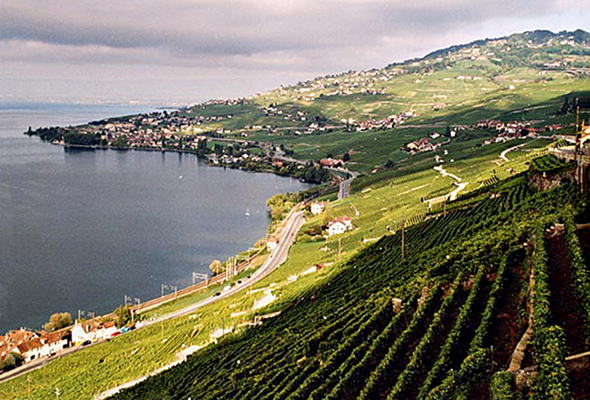
Cully and surrounding vineyards

Cully includes part of the UNESCO World Heritage Site: Lavaux, Vineyard Terraces, which is also part of the list of Swiss heritage site of national significance. The entire town of Cully is part of the Inventory of Swiss Heritage Sites.

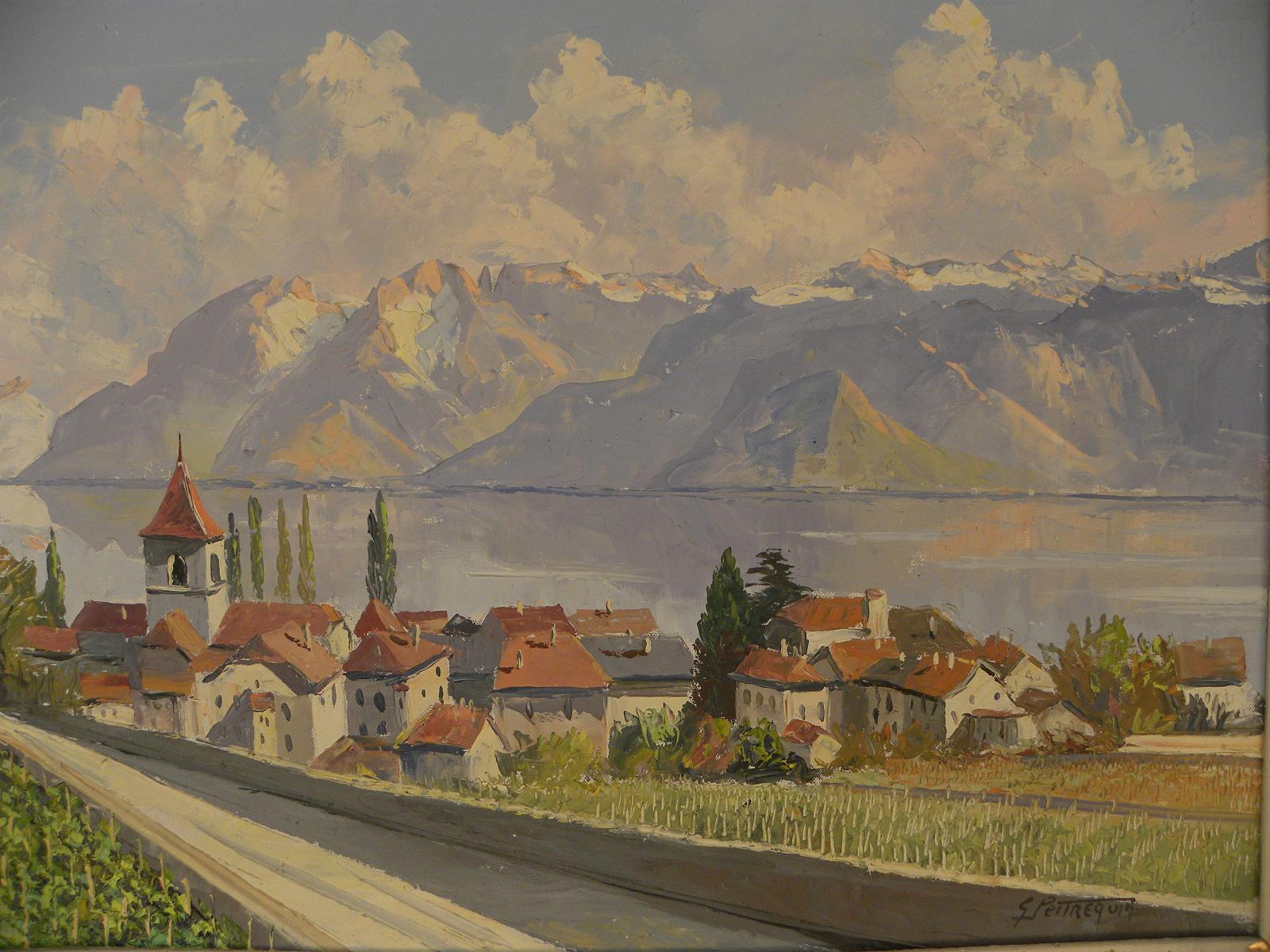
Cully in a mid-20th-century painting by G-R. Peitrequin

Cully has a historic center with narrow streets and picturesque winegrowers' houses dating from the 16th to 19th century. Of the former ramparts little more remains to be seen, the three former city gates were demolished.

The Gothic church of Saint-Étienne was built in 1865–66 on the site of a medieval church. The Maison Jaune, built in 1641 is the Town Hall, and the Bâtiment de Villette (dating back to the 16th century) are listed buildings. Other important buildings are the Bâtiment Vallon (1673) and the Hôtel du Raisin, which was built in 1574 and remodeled in 1630 and formerly served as city hall. There is also a fountain and statue. The lakeside promenade and the port facilities are popular recreational and pedestrian zones. A scenic panorama of the Lake Geneva area, the Alps and the Jura is offered from the lookout tower on the Tower of Gourze from 925 m high on Mont de Gourze.

== Religion ==
From the 2000 census, 822 or 45.7% belonged to the Swiss Reformed Church, while 543 or 30.2% were Roman Catholic. Of the rest of the population, there were 51 members of an Orthodox church (or about 2.84% of the population), there were 3 individuals (or about 0.17% of the population) who belonged to the Christian Catholic Church, and there were 24 individuals (or about 1.33% of the population) who belonged to another Christian church. There were two individuals (or about 0.11% of the population) who were Jewish, and 16 (or about 0.89% of the population) who were Muslim. There was one person who was Hindu and seven individuals who belonged to another church. 266 (or about 14.79% of the population) belonged to no church, are agnostic or atheist, and 73 individuals (or about 4.06% of the population) did not answer the question.

== Education ==
In Cully about 597 or (33.2%) of the population have completed non-mandatory upper secondary education, and 366 or (20.4%) have completed additional higher education (either University or a Fachhochschule). Of the 366 who completed tertiary schooling, 52.7% were Swiss men, 29.2% were Swiss women, 10.4% were non-Swiss men and 7.7% were non-Swiss women.

In the 2009/2010 school year there were a total of 171 students in the Cully school district. In the Vaud cantonal school system, two years of non-obligatory pre-school are provided by the political districts. During the school year, the political district provided pre-school care for a total of 665 children of which 232 children (34.9%) received subsidized pre-school care. The canton's primary school program requires students to attend for four years. There were 85 students in the municipal primary school program. The obligatory lower secondary school program lasts for six years and there were 83 students in those schools. There were also 3 students who were home schooled or attended another non-traditional school.

As of 2000, there were 139 students in Cully who came from another municipality, while 136 residents attended schools outside the municipality.

== In popular culture ==
The fictional daughter of leading Chief Inspector Tom Barnaby in the long-running TV show Midsomer Murders is named Cully. She was conceived in the city of Cully on her parents' honeymoon.

== Notable people ==
- Alfredo Bovet (1909 in Cully - 1993) a Swiss-born Italian cyclist
- Pierrette Micheloud (1915 – 2007 in Cully) a Swiss writer and painter
- Michel Voïta (born 1957 in Cully) a Swiss actor, has appeared in more than sixty films since 1983
