= Epesses railway station =

Railway station in Epesses, Switzerland

Epesses
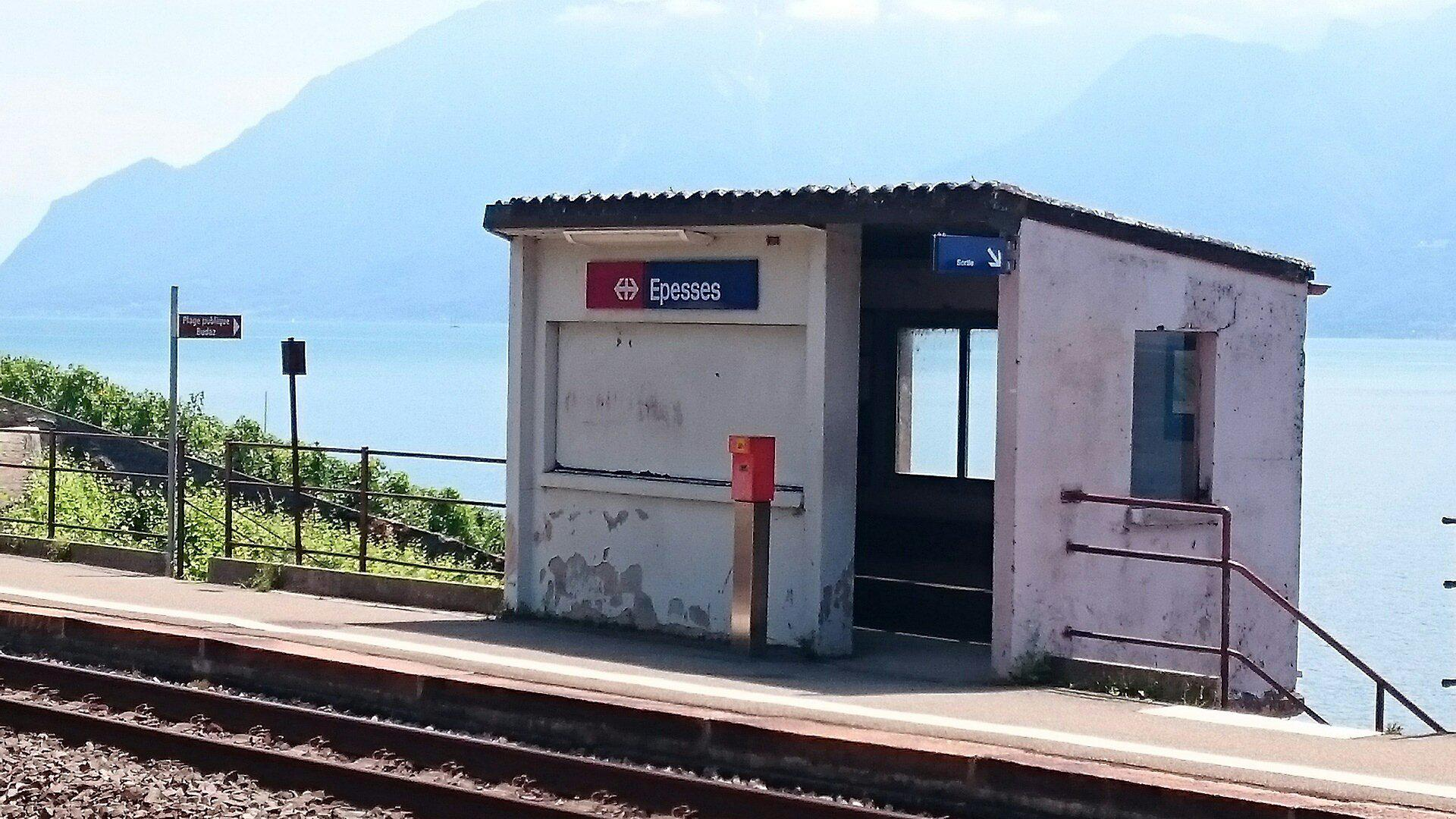
- The station in 2018

General information
- Location: Epesses; Switzerland
- Coordinates: 46°29′22″N 6°44′43″E
- Elevation: 383 m (1,257 ft)
- Owner: Swiss Federal Railways
- Line: Simplon line
- Distance: 10.0 km (6.2 mi) from Lausanne
- Platforms: 2 (2 side platforms)
- Tracks: 2
- Train operators: Swiss Federal Railways

Construction
- Parking: Yes (10 spaces)
- Accessible: No

Other information
- Station code: 8501125 (EPS)
- Fare zone: 19 (mobilis)

Passengers
- 2023: 170 per weekday (SBB)

Services
Preceding station	RER Vaud	Following station
Cully towards Le Brassus or Vallorbe	R4	Rivaz towards Vevey
Location

Epesses railway station (French: Gare d'Épesses) is a railway station in the locality of Epesses, within the municipality of Bourg-en-Lavaux, in the Swiss canton of Vaud. It is an intermediate stop on the standard gauge Simplon line of Swiss Federal Railways.

== Services ==
As of the December 2024 timetable change, the following services stop at Epesses:

- RER Vaud R4: hourly service between Le Brassus and Bex; hourly service to Vallorbe on weekdays; limited service from Bex to St-Maurice.
