= Forel, Vaud =

Forel
- Municipality
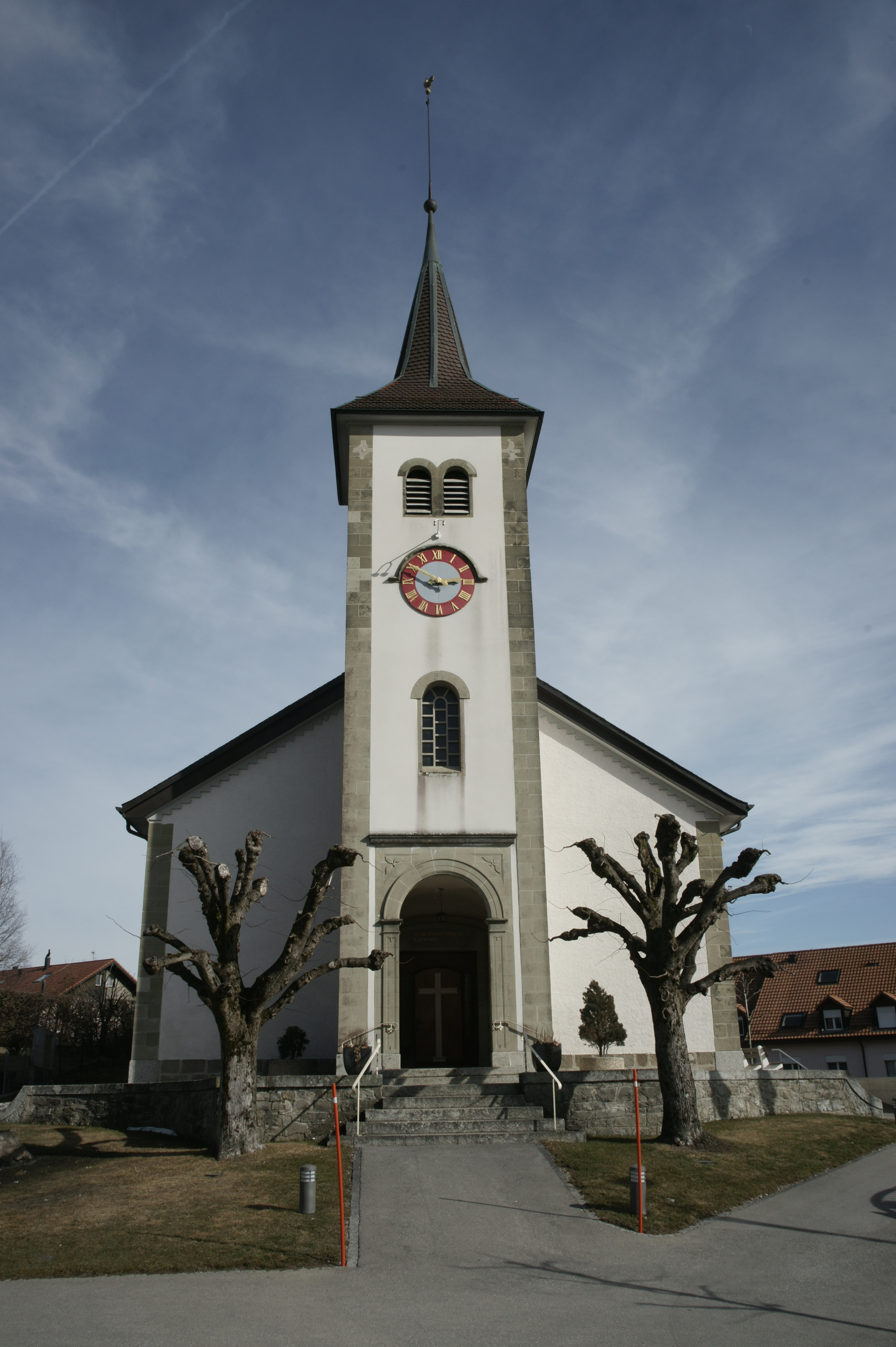

- Flag Coat of arms
- Location of Forel
- Location within Switzerland Location within Canton of Vaud
- Coordinates: 46°32′N 6°45′E
- Country: Switzerland
- Canton: Vaud
- District: Lavaux-Oron

Government
  - Mayor: Syndic

Area
  - Total: 18.44 km^{2} (7.12 sq mi)
- Elevation: 723 m (2,372 ft)

Population (December 2003)
  - Total: 1,735
  - Density: 94.09/km^{2} (243.7/sq mi)
- Demonym: Les Forellois
- Time zone: UTC+01:00 (CET)
  - Summer (DST): UTC+02:00 (CEST)
- Postal code: 1072
- SFOS number: 5604
- ISO 3166 code: CH-VD
- Surrounded by: Cully, Epesses, Essertes, Grandvaux, Les Cullayes, Les Tavernes, Puidoux, Riex, Savigny, Servion, Villette, Vuibroye
- Website: www.forel.ch

Forel (French pronunciation: [fɔʁɛl]) is a municipality in the Swiss canton of Vaud, located in the district of Lavaux-Oron.

== History ==
The oldest document mentioning the area around Forel (Lavaux) is dated 1140, and mentions Guy de Maligny, the bishop of Lausanne, owning the land with the Lac de Joux Abbey. The document mentioning the forests of Forel (Fores) dates to 1274. In 1300 it was mentioned as Forel.

In 1298, Pierre and Garnier de Palézieux bought the hamlet of Forel (known today as the "In Forel") and the surrounding forests from Louis I of Savoy. Two years later, the same Baron of Vaud sold the land to the bishop of Lausanne and it became part of the district of the Grande Paroisse de Villette.

After the departure of Lausanne's last prince-bishop in 1536, and the lands came under the administration of Bern, and established the district known as the Place General de Villette. It was not until 1601 that a representative of the farming area of Forel was invited to join the district council in Cully. The Bernese occupation did little to alleviate the feudal taxes and the inhabitants ended up paying more taxes and the tithes (of cereals, wine, vegetables, hemp, flax, cattle and others).

After the collapse of the ancien régime, Forel from 1798 to 1803 under the Helvetic Republic was under the administration of the Canton of Léman and then the Canton of Vaud. In 1798 it became a part of the district of Lavaux. Forel belonged until 1824 to the Greater Municipality of Villette and was also known as Les Monts de Villette in reference to its mountains. In 1822 petitions to the State Council from residents of Epesses, the Monts de Villette and Aran, signed by some 145 people, reflected a showing the strong desire for local autonomy.

In 1824, the State Council accepted the division of the municipality of Villette into the areas Cully and Chenaux (capital, Cully) Riex, Epesses, Grandvaux and Curson (capital, Grandvaux) Villette and Aran (capital, Villette) and Forel, which included Les Monts de Villette.

A Provisional Council of six members was appointed and a meeting took place on 2 August 1824. Jean-François Noverraz, who had previously represented Les Monts of Forel in Cully, was chosen as a delegate to represent Forel and was approved on 11 August 1826 by the State Council. The electoral assembly of the municipality was convened between 13 and 14 November 1826 and the first municipal council composed of citizens (all men aged thirty years and more) met on 14 December 1826. From 1827 the council used the Regamey farm until 1974 to hold municipal council meetings.

== Geography ==
Forel is located at 716 m (2,349 ft) above sea level, 11 km (7 mi) east of the capital of the canton of Lausanne (as the crow flies). The scattered settlement community extends to the southeast in the Jorat plateau, north of Lake Geneva basin, in the Vaud Midlands.

Forel (Lavaux) has an area, as of 2009, of 18.51 square kilometres (7.15 mi^{2}). Of this area, 11.88 km^{2} (4.59 mi^{2} or 64.2%) is used for agricultural purposes, while 5.1 km^{2} (2.0 mi^{2} or 27.6%) is forested. Of the rest of the land, 1.45 km^{2} (0.56 mi^{2} or 7.8%) is settled (buildings or roads), 5 ha (12 acres or 0.3%) is either rivers or lakes and 1 ha (2.5 acres or 0.1%) is unproductive land.

Of the built up area, housing and buildings made up 4.2% and transportation infrastructure made up 2.6%. Out of the forested land, 26.3% of the total land area is heavily forested and 1.2% is covered with orchards or small clusters of trees. Of the agricultural land, 46.7% is used for growing crops and 16.5% is pastures. All the water in the municipality is flowing water.

The municipality was part of the Lavaux District until it was dissolved on 31 August 2006, and Forel (Lavaux) became part of the new district of Lavaux-Oron.

The municipal area is drained by the Grenet River which forms part of its natural municipal boundary. The central part is the over 690 m (2,260 ft) above sea level. To the north lies the town land in the forest area Bois du Grand Jorat (up to 884 m (2,900 ft) above sea level), which arises from the Carrouge. In the northeast, includes the territory of Petit Jorat at 730 m (2,400 ft) above sea level. To the west is the gently sloping hillside of Savigny. To the south, the town area extends to the wooded heights of Mont de Gourze at 925 m (3,035 ft) above sea level, the highest point on the watershed between the basins of the Rhône and Rhine.

The municipality consists of the real estate community center Cornes de Cerf (716 m (2,349 ft) above sea level) and numerous hamlets and settlements, including Le Pigeon, Le Plan, Le Grenet, Les Chesaudes and La Tuilière, all located on the southeast Jorat plateau, as well as many individual farms. The municipality is surrounded by Puidoux, Epesses, Riex, Cully, Grandvaux, Villette, Savigny, Les Cullayes, Servion, Essertes, Châtillens and Les Tavernes.

== Coat of arms ==
The blazon of the municipal coat of arms is Gules, a letter F between Antlers all of Argent.

== Demographics ==
Forel (Lavaux) has a population (as of December 2020) of 2,107. As of 2008, 15.2% of the population are resident foreign nationals. Over the last 10 years (1999–2009) the population has changed at a rate of 13.2%. It has changed at a rate of 8.7% due to migration and at a rate of 5.3% due to births and deaths.

Most of the population (as of 2000) speaks French (1,571 or 92.2%), with German being second most common (56 or 3.3%) and Portuguese being third (23 or 1.3%). There are nine people who speak Italian.

Of the population in the municipality 488 or about 28.6% were born in Forel (Lavaux) and lived there in 2000. There were 655 or 38.4% who were born in the same canton, while 232 or 13.6% were born somewhere else in Switzerland, and 280 or 16.4% were born outside of Switzerland.

In 2008 there were 14 live births to Swiss citizens and 8 births to non-Swiss citizens, and in same time span there were 17 deaths of Swiss citizens. Ignoring immigration and emigration, the population of Swiss citizens decreased by 3 while the foreign population increased by 8. There was 1 Swiss man who emigrated from Switzerland and 1 Swiss woman who immigrated back to Switzerland. At the same time, there were 19 non-Swiss men and 5 non-Swiss women who immigrated from another country to Switzerland. The total Swiss population change in 2008 (from all sources, including moves across municipal borders) was a decrease of 30 and the non-Swiss population increased by 27 people. This represents a population growth rate of -0.2%.

The age distribution, as of 2009, in Forel (Lavaux) is; 236 children or 12.5% of the population are between 0 and 9 years old and 221 teenagers or 11.7% are between 10 and 19. Of the adult population, 206 people or 10.9% of the population are between 20 and 29 years old. 291 people or 15.4% are between 30 and 39, 314 people or 16.6% are between 40 and 49, and 239 people or 12.6% are between 50 and 59. The senior population distribution is 209 people or 11.1% of the population are between 60 and 69 years old, 98 people or 5.2% are between 70 and 79, there are 60 people or 3.2% who are between 80 and 89, and there are 16 people or 0.8% who are 90 and older.

As of 2000, there were 732 people who were single and never married in the municipality. There were 793 married individuals, 83 widows or widowers and 96 individuals who are divorced.

As of 2000, there were 671 private households in the municipality, and an average of 2.5 persons per household. There were 179 households that consist of only one person and 58 households with five or more people. Out of a total of 679 households that answered this question, 26.4% were households made up of just one person and there were 8 adults who lived with their parents. Of the rest of the households, there are 193 married couples without children, 242 married couples with children There were 34 single parents with a child or children. There were 15 households that were made up of unrelated people and 8 households that were made up of some sort of institution or another collective housing.

In 2000 there were 232 single-family homes (or 54.1% of the total) out of a total of 429 inhabited buildings. There were 68 multi-family buildings (15.9%), along with 105 multi-purpose buildings that were mostly used for housing (24.5%) and 24 other use buildings (commercial or industrial) that also had some housing (5.6%). Of the single-family homes 51 were built before 1919, while 16 were built between 1990 and 2000. The greatest number of single-family homes (53) were built between 1971 and 1980. The most multi-family homes (20) were built between 1971 and 1980 and the next most (17) were built before 1919. There were 3 multi-family houses built between 1996 and 2000.

In 2000 there were 745 apartments in the municipality. The most common apartment size was 4 rooms of which there were 212. There were 38 single room apartments and 233 apartments with five or more rooms. Of these apartments, a total of 658 apartments (88.3% of the total) were permanently occupied, while 64 apartments (8.6%) were seasonally occupied and 23 apartments (3.1%) were empty. As of 2009, the construction rate of new housing units was 0 new units per 1000 residents. The vacancy rate for the municipality, in 2010, was 0.24%.

The historical population is given in the following chart:

== Economy ==
Forel was until the second half of the 20th century, a primarily agricultural village. Agriculture, dairy farming and animal husbandry, and forestry is an important factor in the employment structure of the population. All three industries currently employ about 33% of the workforce.

Since the 1970s, an industrial park was established in the range of Le Pigeon. Here, companies have developed in the construction industry and information technology, in addition there is also a company that manufactures kitchen appliances. Through the construction of numerous single-family homes in the last decades, the village has developed into a residential community. Many workers though are commuters who work mainly in Lausanne and in the Vevey-Montreux region.

As of 2010, Forel (Lavaux) had an unemployment rate of 3.3%. As of 2008, there were 111 people employed in the primary economic sector and about 48 businesses involved in this sector. 247 people were employed in the secondary sector and there were 31 businesses in this sector. 232 people were employed in the tertiary sector, with 55 businesses in this sector. There were 886 residents of the municipality who were employed in some capacity, of which females made up 42.3% of the workforce.

In 2008 the total number of full-time equivalent jobs was 512. The number of jobs in the primary sector was 84, of which 80 were in agriculture and 4 were in forestry or lumber production. The number of jobs in the secondary sector was 239 of which 110 or (46.0%) were in manufacturing and 129 (54.0%) were in construction. The number of jobs in the tertiary sector was 189. In the tertiary sector; 80 or 42.3% were in wholesale or retail sales or the repair of motor vehicles, 6 or 3.2% were in the movement and storage of goods, 21 or 11.1% were in a hotel or restaurant, 2 or 1.1% were in the information industry, 3 or 1.6% were the insurance or financial industry, 11 or 5.8% were technical professionals or scientists, 9 or 4.8% were in education and 23 or 12.2% were in health care.

In 2000, there were 192 workers who commuted into the municipality and 653 workers who commuted away. The municipality is a net exporter of workers, with about 3.4 workers leaving the municipality for every one entering. Of the working population, 9.7% used public transportation to get to work, and 68.8% used a private car.

== Politics ==
In the 2007 federal election the most popular party was the SVP which received 25.4% of the vote. The next three most popular parties were the LPS Party (15.75%), the FDP (14.61%) and the SP (14.17%). In the federal election, a total of 581 votes were cast, and the voter turnout was 46.6%.

== Religion ==
From the 2000 census, 376 or 22.1% were Roman Catholic, while 927 or 54.4% belonged to the Swiss Reformed Church. Of the rest of the population, there were 12 members of an Orthodox church (or about 0.70% of the population), there were 2 individuals (or about 0.12% of the population) who belonged to the Christian Catholic Church, and there were 78 individuals (or about 4.58% of the population) who belonged to another Christian church. There were 3 individuals (or about 0.18% of the population) who were Jewish, and 21 (or about 1.23% of the population) who were Islamic. There were 3 individuals who belonged to another church. 249 (or about 14.61% of the population) belonged to no church, are agnostic or atheist, and 70 individuals (or about 4.11% of the population) did not answer the question.

== Education ==
In Forel (Lavaux) about 635 or (37.3%) of the population have completed non-mandatory upper secondary education, and 212 or (12.4%) have completed additional higher education (either university or a Fachhochschule). Of the 212 who completed tertiary schooling, 50.9% were Swiss men, 31.1% were Swiss women, 8.0% were non-Swiss men and 9.9% were non-Swiss women.

In the 2009/2010 school year there were a total of 217 students in the Forel (Lavaux) school district. In the Vaud cantonal school system, two years of non-obligatory pre-school are provided by the political districts. During the school year, the political district provided pre-school care for a total of 665 children of which 232 children (34.9%) received subsidized pre-school care. The canton's primary school program requires students to attend for four years. There were 136 students in the municipal primary school program. The obligatory lower secondary school program lasts for six years and there were 81 students in those schools.

As of 2000, there were 46 students in Forel (Lavaux) who came from another municipality, while 150 residents attended schools outside the municipality.

== Transport ==
The community is well developed. It lies on the main road from Moudon to Vevey, which is here crossed by the Lausanne - Oron-la-Ville road. The nearest motorway, inaugurated in 1974, is the A9 road which connects Lausanne to Sion. Forel is connected through the bus line 65.
