= Treytorrens, Lavaux =

Coordinates: 46°29′5″N 6°45′16″E

Treytorrens is a village in the commune of Puidoux in the district of Lavaux and is located in the canton of Vaud.
