= Meillerie =

- Commune
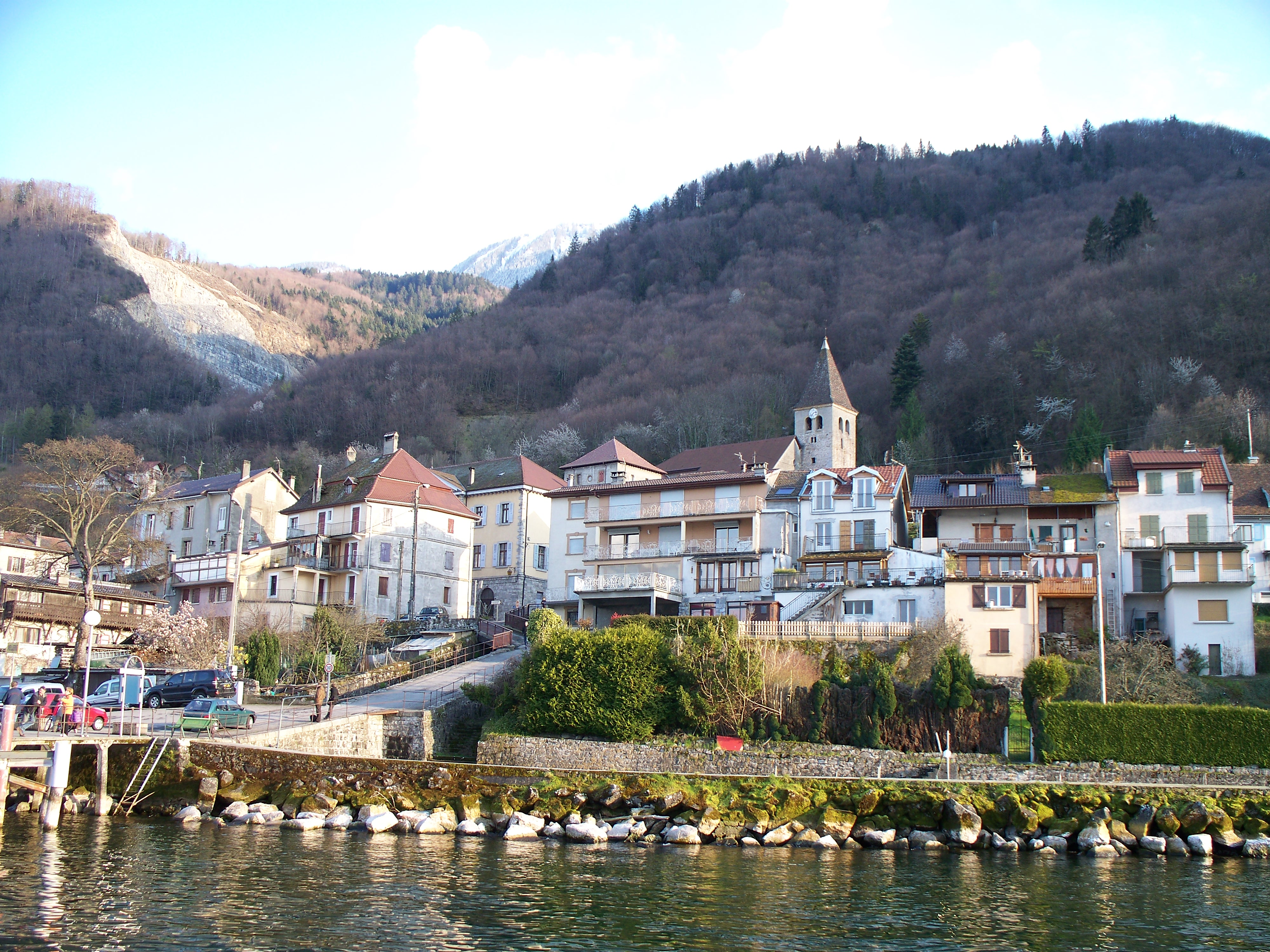
- Meillerie on the shore of Lake Geneva

- Coat of arms
- Location of Meillerie
- Location within France Location within Auvergne-Rhône-Alpes
- Coordinates: 46°24′24″N 6°43′06″E
- Country: France
- Region: Auvergne-Rhône-Alpes
- Department: Haute-Savoie
- Arrondissement: Thonon-les-Bains
- Canton: Évian-les-Bains

Government
  - Mayor (2020–2026): Laurent Pertuiset
- Area^{1}: 3.91 km^{2} (1.51 sq mi)
- Highest elevation: 1,000 m (3,300 ft)
- Lowest elevation: 372 m (1,220 ft)
- Population (2023): 293
  - Density: 74.9/km^{2} (194/sq mi)
- Time zone: UTC+01:00 (CET)
  - Summer (DST): UTC+02:00 (CEST)
- INSEE/Postal code: 74175 /74500
- ^{1} French Land Register data, which excludes lakes, ponds, glaciers > 1 km^{2} (0.386 sq mi or 247 acres) and river estuaries.

Meillerie (French pronunciation: [mɛjʁi]; Arpitan: Mèlèrya) is a commune in the Haute-Savoie department in the Auvergne-Rhône-Alpes region in south-eastern France.

== See also ==
- Communes of the Haute-Savoie department
