= Oron, Vaud =

Oron
- Municipality
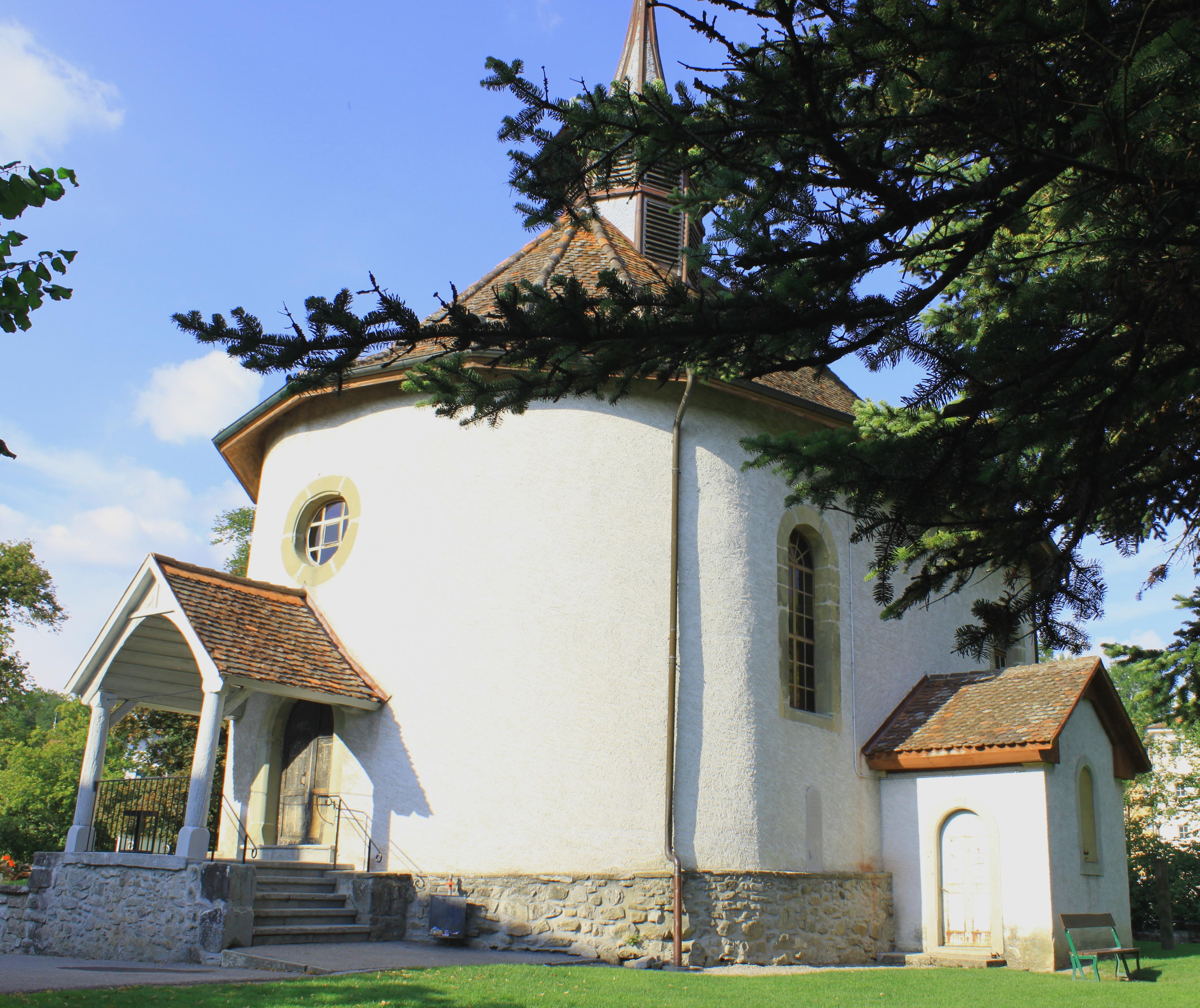
- Church in Oron-la-Ville

- Flag Coat of arms
- Location of Oron
- Location within Switzerland Location within Canton of Vaud
- Coordinates: 46°34′N 6°50′E
- Country: Switzerland
- Canton: Vaud
- District: Lavaux-Oron

Government
  - Mayor: Syndic

Area
  - Total: 3.11 km^{2} (1.20 sq mi)
- Elevation: 631 m (2,070 ft)

Population (December 2007)
  - Total: 1,304
  - Density: 419/km^{2} (1,090/sq mi)
- Demonym(s): Oronais, Oronaises
- Time zone: UTC+01:00 (CET)
  - Summer (DST): UTC+02:00 (CEST)
- Postal code: 1610, 1612
- SFOS number: 5805
- ISO 3166 code: CH-VD
- Surrounded by: Auboranges (FR), Chapelle (Glâne) (FR), Palézieux, Rue (FR), Vuibroye
- Twin towns: Bussac (France)
- Website: https://www.oron.ch Profile (in French), SFSO statistics

Oron (French pronunciation: [ɔʁɔ̃]) is a municipality in the district of Lavaux-Oron in the canton of Vaud in Switzerland. It was formed on 1 January 2012 when the former municipalities of Bussigny-sur-Oron, Châtillens, Chesalles-sur-Oron, Ecoteaux, Oron-la-Ville, Oron-le-Châtel, Palézieux, Les Tavernes, Les Thioleyres and Vuibroye merged. On 1 January 2022 the former municipality of Essertes merged into Oron.

== History ==
Bussigny-sur-Oron is first mentioned in 1433 as Bussignye. In 1517 it was mentioned in a land registry of Count Jean II de Gruyère. Châtillens is first mentioned in 1141 as Castellens. The village of Chesalles-sur-Oron was first mentioned in 1330 when the surrounding land was acquired by the Bishop of Lausanne. Ecoteaux is first mentioned in 1134 as Escotaux. Oron-la-Ville is first mentioned about 280 as Uromago. In 1018 it was mentioned as Auronum. Oron-le-Châtel is first mentioned in 1137 as Oruns. Palézieux is first mentioned in 1134 as de Palaisol.

== Blazon ==
The blazon of the municipal coat of arms is Gules, a Lion rampant Argent, surrounded by ten Billets of the same.

== Geography ==
Aerial view (1958)

Oron has an area of 24.62 km^{2} (9.51 sq mi).

== Demographics ==
Oron has a population (as of December 2020) of 5,664.

== Historic Population ==
The historical population is given in the following chart:

== Heritage sites of national significance ==
The Temple of Oron-la-Ville, Oron Castle and its library, the Cistercian abbey of Haut Crêt are listed as a Swiss heritage site of national significance. The entire old town of Oron-le-Châtel is part of the Inventory of Swiss Heritage Sites.

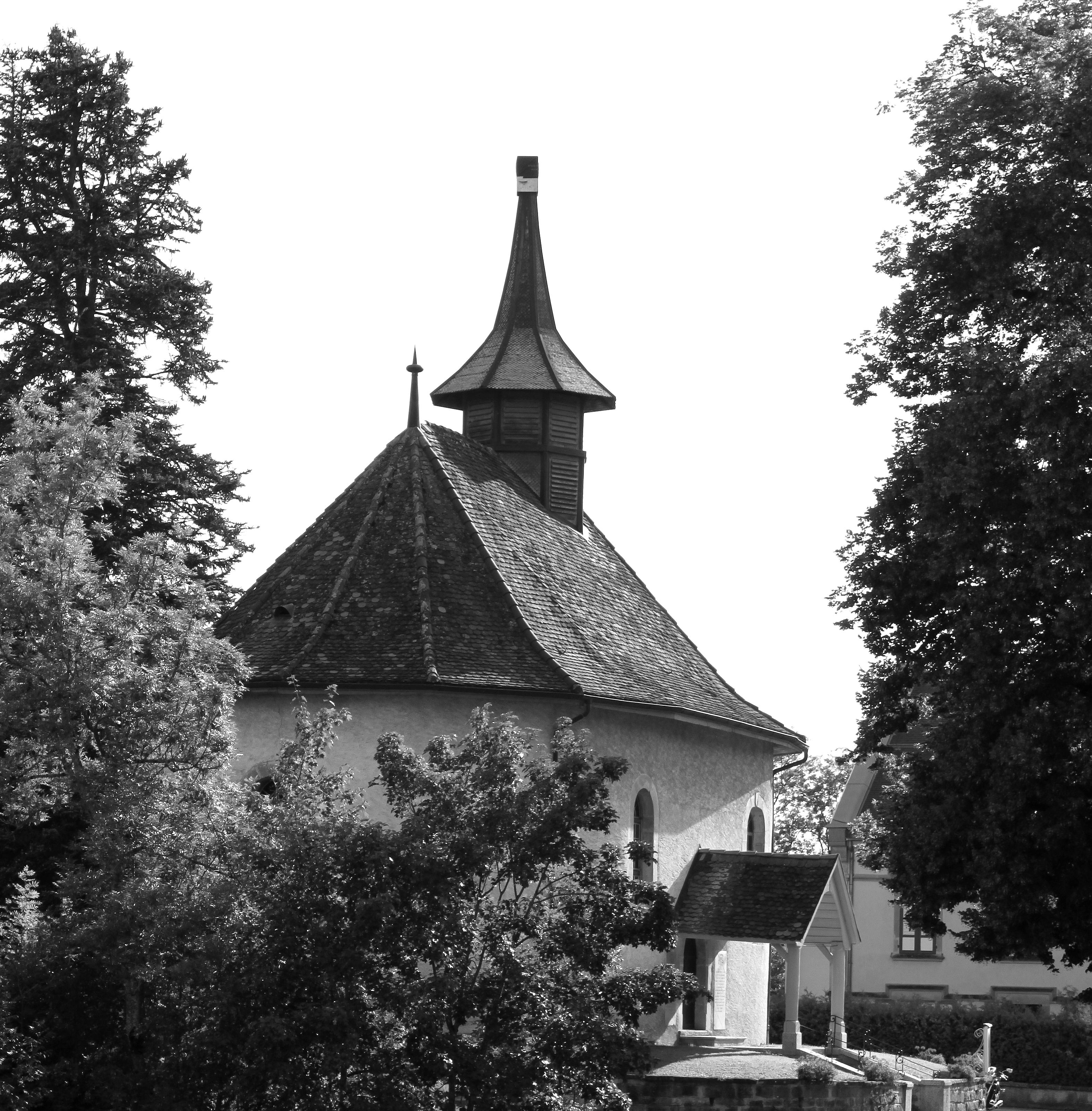
Temple of Oron-la-Ville

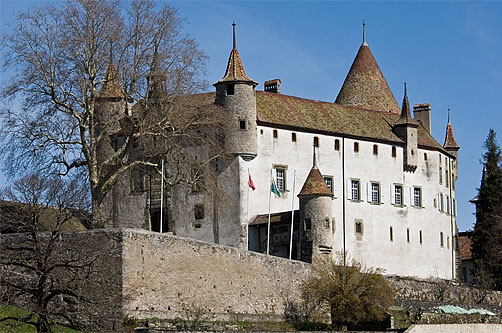
Oron Castle.

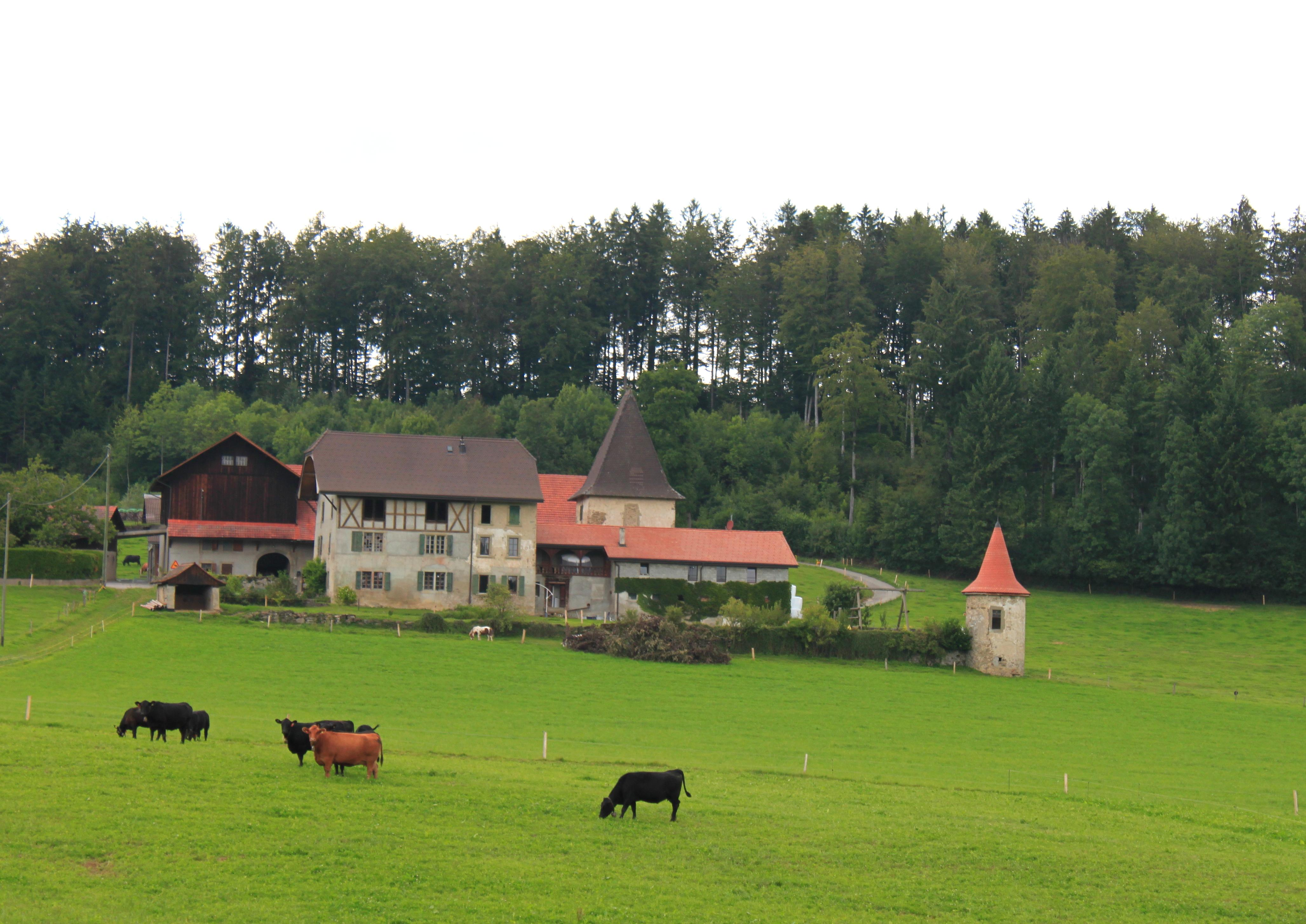
Domaine de la Dauzaz

== Twin Town ==
Oron-la-Ville is twinned with the town of Bussac, France. Palézieux is twinned with the town of Vers-Pont du Gard, France.

== Formation ==
The municipality was formed on 1 January 2012 with the merger of the (now former) municipalities of Bussigny-sur-Oron, Châtillens, Chesalles-sur-Oron, Ecoteaux, Oron-la-Ville, Oron-le-Châtel, Palézieux, Les Tavernes, Les Thioleyres and Vuibroye.

== Transportation ==
There are four railway stations within the borders of the municipality: Châtillens and Palézieux-Village on the Palézieux–Lyss line; Oron on the Lausanne–Bern line; and Palézieux, located at the junction of both lines and also the northern terminus of the Châtel-St-Denis–Palézieux line. Destinations served include Lausanne, Bern, Geneva, and Lucerne.
