= Oron-le-Châtel =

- Former municipality
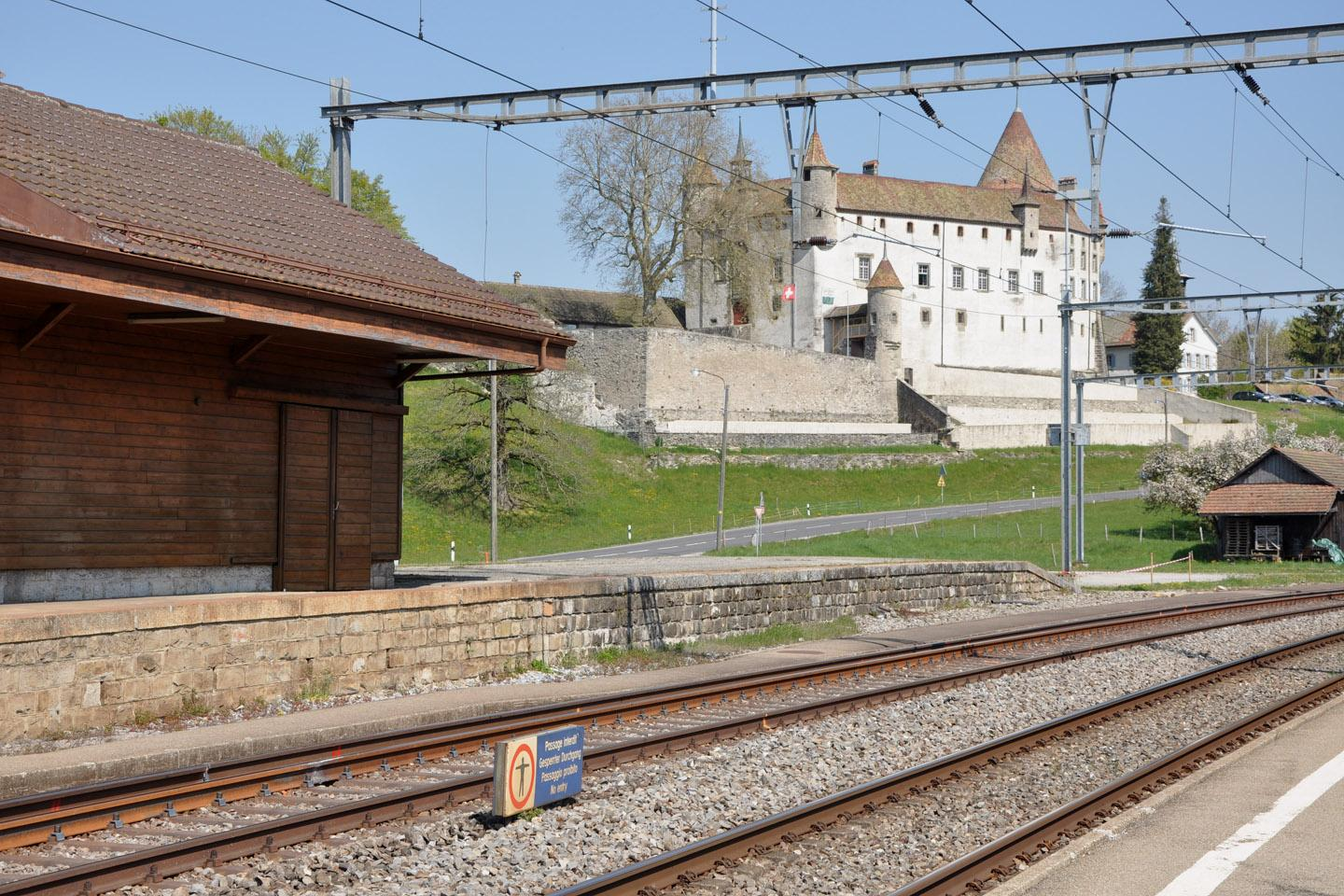
- Oron-le-Châtel train station and Oron Castle

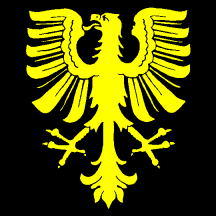
- Flag Coat of arms
- Location of Oron-le-Châtel
- Location within Switzerland Location within Canton of Vaud
- Coordinates: 46°34′N 06°50′E
- Country: Switzerland
- Canton: Vaud
- District: Lavaux-Oron

Government
  - Mayor: Mme Danielle Richard-Martignier

Area
  - Total: 1.26 km^{2} (0.49 sq mi)
- Elevation: 722 m (2,369 ft)

Population (2010)
  - Total: 293
  - Density: 233/km^{2} (602/sq mi)
- Demonym: Les Tournesols
- Time zone: UTC+01:00 (CET)
  - Summer (DST): UTC+02:00 (CEST)
- Postal code: 1608
- SFOS number: 5794
- ISO 3166 code: CH-VD
- Surrounded by: Chapelle (Glâne) (FR), Chesalles-sur-Oron, Palézieux, Oron-la-Ville
- Website: Profile (in French), SFSO statistics

Oron-le-Châtel (French pronunciation: [ɔʁɔ̃ lə ʃatɛl]) is a former municipality in the district of Lavaux-Oron in the canton of Vaud in Switzerland. The municipalities of Bussigny-sur-Oron, Châtillens, Chesalles-sur-Oron, Ecoteaux, Oron-la-Ville, Oron-le-Châtel, Palézieux, Les Tavernes, Les Thioleyres and Vuibroye merged on 1 January 2012 into the new municipality of Oron.

== History ==
Oron-le-Châtel is first mentioned in 1137 as Oruns.

== Geography ==
Oron-le-Châtel had an area, as of 2009, of 1.3 square kilometers (0.50 mi^{2}). Of this area, 0.68 km^{2} (0.26 mi^{2}) or 54.0% is used for agricultural purposes, while 0.38 km^{2} (0.15 mi^{2}) or 30.2% is forested. Of the rest of the land, 0.18 km^{2} (0.069 mi^{2}) or 14.3% is settled (buildings or roads) and 0.01 km^{2} (2.5 acres) or 0.8% is unproductive land.

Of the built up area, housing and buildings made up 9.5% and transportation infrastructure made up 4.8%. Out of the forested land, all of the forested land area is covered with heavy forests. Of the agricultural land, 35.7% is used for growing crops and 17.5% is pastures.

The municipality was part of the Oron District until it was dissolved on 31 August 2006, and Oron-le-Châtel became part of the new district of Lavaux-Oron.

The former municipality is located on the right bank of the Broye.

== Coat of arms ==
The blazon of the municipal coat of arms is Sable, an Eagle Or.

== Demographics ==
Oron-le-Châtel has a population (as of 2010) of 293. As of 2008, 13.3% of the population are resident foreign nationals. Over the last 10 years (1999–2009 ) the population has changed at a rate of 42.5%. It has changed at a rate of 30.7% due to migration and at a rate of 13.2% due to births and deaths.

Most of the population (as of 2000) speaks French (222 or 95.3%), with German being second most common (5 or 2.1%) and Swedish being third (2 or 0.9%). and 1 person who speaks Romansh.

The age distribution, as of 2009, in Oron-le-Châtel is; 38 children or 12.6% of the population are between 0 and 9 years old and 57 teenagers or 18.9% are between 10 and 19. Of the adult population, 32 people or 10.6% of the population are between 20 and 29 years old. 34 people or 11.3% are between 30 and 39, 64 people or 21.2% are between 40 and 49, and 37 people or 12.3% are between 50 and 59. The senior population distribution is 24 people or 7.9% of the population are between 60 and 69 years old, 12 people or 4.0% are between 70 and 79, there are 4 people or 1.3% who are between 80 and 89.

As of 2000, there were 94 people who were single and never married in the municipality. There were 122 married individuals, 8 widows or widowers and 9 individuals who are divorced.

As of 2000 the average number of residents per living room was 0.58 which is about equal to the cantonal average of 0.61 per room. In this case, a room is defined as space of a housing unit of at least 4 m^{2} (43 sq ft) as normal bedrooms, dining rooms, living rooms, kitchens and habitable cellars and attics. About 62.4% of the total households were owner occupied, or in other words did not pay rent (though they may have a mortgage or a rent-to-own agreement).

As of 2000, there were 86 private households in the municipality, and an average of 2.7 persons per household. There were 21 households that consist of only one person and 10 households with five or more people. Out of a total of 89 households that answered this question, 23.6% were households made up of just one person. Of the rest of the households, there are 25 married couples without children, 36 married couples with children There were 3 single parents with a child or children. There was 1 household that was made up of unrelated people and 3 households that were made up of some sort of institution or another collective housing.

In 2000 there were 46 single family homes (or 62.2% of the total) out of a total of 74 inhabited buildings. There were 9 multi-family buildings (12.2%), along with 9 multi-purpose buildings that were mostly used for housing (12.2%) and 10 other use buildings (commercial or industrial) that also had some housing (13.5%).

In 2000, a total of 85 apartments (87.6% of the total) were permanently occupied, while 8 apartments (8.2%) were seasonally occupied and 4 apartments (4.1%) were empty. As of 2009, the construction rate of new housing units was 0 new units per 1000 residents. The vacancy rate for the municipality, in 2010, was 0%.

The historical population is given in the following chart:

== Heritage sites of national significance ==
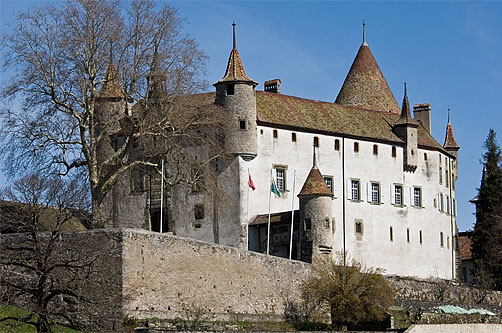
Oron Castle.

Oron Castle and its library is listed as a Swiss heritage site of national significance. The entire old town of Oron-le-Châtel is part of the Inventory of Swiss Heritage Sites.

== Politics ==
In the 2007 federal election the most popular party was the SVP which received 24.76% of the vote. The next three most popular parties were the SP (21.58%), the Green Party (15.4%) and the FDP (11.9%). In the federal election, a total of 90 votes were cast, and the voter turnout was 49.7%.

== Economy ==
As of 2010, Oron-le-Châtel had an unemployment rate of 2.1%. As of 2008, there were 13 people employed in the primary economic sector and about 4 businesses involved in this sector. 6 people were employed in the secondary sector and there were 3 businesses in this sector. 20 people were employed in the tertiary sector, with 7 businesses in this sector. There were 114 residents of the municipality who were employed in some capacity, of which females made up 38.6% of the workforce.

In 2008 the total number of full-time equivalent jobs was 30. The number of jobs in the primary sector was 8, all of which were in agriculture. The number of jobs in the secondary sector was 6 of which 4 or (66.7%) were in manufacturing and 2 (33.3%) were in construction. The number of jobs in the tertiary sector was 16. In the tertiary sector; 6 or 37.5% were in the sale or repair of motor vehicles, 6 or 37.5% were in the movement and storage of goods, 2 or 12.5% were in a hotel or restaurant, .

In 2000, there were 20 workers who commuted into the municipality and 86 workers who commuted away. The municipality is a net exporter of workers, with about 4.3 workers leaving the municipality for every one entering. Of the working population, 16.7% used public transportation to get to work, and 59.6% used a private car.

== Religion ==
From the 2000 census, 56 or 24.0% were Roman Catholic, while 100 or 42.9% belonged to the Swiss Reformed Church. Of the rest of the population, there were 2 members of an Orthodox church (or about 0.86% of the population), and there were 66 individuals (or about 28.33% of the population) who belonged to another Christian church. There was 1 individual who was Islamic. 37 (or about 15.88% of the population) belonged to no church, are agnostic or atheist, and 2 individuals (or about 0.86% of the population) did not answer the question.

== Education ==
In Oron-le-Châtel about 99 or (42.5%) of the population have completed non-mandatory upper secondary education, and 32 or (13.7%) have completed additional higher education (either university or a Fachhochschule). Of the 32 who completed tertiary schooling, 56.3% were Swiss men, 15.6% were Swiss women and 18.8% were non-Swiss women.

In the 2009/2010 school year there were a total of 49 students in the Oron-le-Châtel school district. In the Vaud cantonal school system, two years of non-obligatory pre-school are provided by the political districts. During the school year, the political district provided pre-school care for a total of 665 children of which 232 children (34.9%) received subsidized pre-school care. The canton's primary school program requires students to attend for four years. There were 23 students in the municipal primary school program. The obligatory lower secondary school program lasts for six years and there were 26 students in those schools.

As of 2000, there were 43 students from Oron-le-Châtel who attended schools outside the municipality.
