= Bussac =

Bussac may refer to the following places in France:

- Bussac-Forêt, in the Charente-Maritime département
- Bussac, in the Dordogne département
