= Maracon =

- Municipality
- Flag Coat of arms
- Location of Maracon
- Location within Switzerland Location within Canton of Vaud
- Coordinates: 46°32′N 06°52′E
- Country: Switzerland
- Canton: Vaud
- District: Lavaux-Oron

Government
  - Mayor: Syndic; Jean-Claude Serex

Area
  - Total: 4.39 km^{2} (1.69 sq mi)
- Elevation: 843 m (2,766 ft)

Population (2004)
  - Total: 423
  - Density: 96.4/km^{2} (250/sq mi)
- Demonym(s): Les Maraconais; Lè Bourata-caion
- Time zone: UTC+01:00 (CET)
  - Summer (DST): UTC+02:00 (CEST)
- Postal codes: 1613 Maracon; 1613 La Rogivue
- SFOS number: 5790
- ISO 3166 code: CH-VD
- Surrounded by: Saint-Martin (FR), Semsales (FR), Châtel-Saint-Denis (FR), Remaufens (FR), Ecoteaux, Bussigny-sur-Oron
- Website: https://www.maracon.ch Profile (in French), SFSO statistics

Maracon is a municipality in the district of Lavaux-Oron in the canton of Vaud in Switzerland. On 1 January 2003 the former municipality of La Rogivue merged into the municipality of Maracon, keeping the name Maracon.

== History ==
Maracon is first mentioned around 1201-50 as Montimarascon.

== Geography ==
Maracon has an area, as of 2009, of 4.4 square kilometers (1.7 mi^{2}). Of this area, 2.98 km^{2} (1.15 mi^{2}) or 68.0% is used for agricultural purposes, while 1 km^{2} (0.39 mi^{2}) or 22.8% is forested. Of the rest of the land, 0.27 km^{2} (0.10 mi^{2}) or 6.2% is settled (buildings or roads), 0.01 km^{2} (2.5 acres) or 0.2% is either rivers or lakes and 0.15 km^{2} (37 acres) or 3.4% is unproductive land.

Of the built up area, housing and buildings made up 3.2% and transportation infrastructure made up 1.8%. Out of the forested land, 20.8% of the total land area is heavily forested and 2.1% is covered with orchards or small clusters of trees. Of the agricultural land, 42.7% is used for growing crops and 24.9% is pastures. All the water in the municipality is flowing water.

The municipality was part of the Oron District until it was dissolved on 31 August 2006, and Maracon became part of the new district of Lavaux-Oron.

The municipality is located on the right bank of the Broye. It consists of the villages of Maracon, the former municipality of La Rogivue and a number of hamlets including Very.

== Coat of arms ==
The blazon of the municipal coat of arms is Per fess, the Chief Or, Semi Lion rampant issuant Gules; and the base per pale Gules, a Bend Or, cotised Argent and Argent, two Bends wavy Gules.

== Demographics ==
Maracon has a population (as of December 2020) of 537. As of 2008, 5.1% of the population are resident foreign nationals. Over the last 10 years (1999–2009 ) the population has changed at a rate of 5.1%. It has changed at a rate of 1.7% due to migration and at a rate of 2.7% due to births and deaths.

Most of the population (as of 2000) speaks French (319 or 92.7%), with German being second most common (14 or 4.1%) and Dutch being third (3 or 0.9%). There is 1 person who speaks Italian and 1 person who speaks Romansh.

The age distribution, as of 2009, in Maracon is; 46 children or 10.6% of the population are between 0 and 9 years old and 65 teenagers or 14.9% are between 10 and 19. Of the adult population, 55 people or 12.6% of the population are between 20 and 29 years old. 33 people or 7.6% are between 30 and 39, 94 people or 21.6% are between 40 and 49, and 56 people or 12.8% are between 50 and 59. The senior population distribution is 39 people or 8.9% of the population are between 60 and 69 years old, 31 people or 7.1% are between 70 and 79, there are 15 people or 3.4% who are between 80 and 89, and there are 2 people or 0.5% who are 90 and older.

As of 2000, there were 147 people who were single and never married in the municipality. There were 174 married individuals, 18 widows or widowers and 5 individuals who are divorced.

As of 2000, there were 156 private households in the municipality, and an average of 2.7 persons per household. There were 26 households that consist of only one person and 12 households with five or more people. Out of a total of 127 households that answered this question, 20.5% were households made up of just one person. Of the rest of the households, there are 43 married couples without children, 55 married couples with children There were 2 single parents with a child or children.

In 2000 there were 75 single family homes (or 69.4% of the total) out of a total of 108 inhabited buildings. There were 12 multi-family buildings (11.1%), along with 19 multi-purpose buildings that were mostly used for housing (17.6%) and 2 other use buildings (commercial or industrial) that also had some housing (1.9%).

In 2000, a total of 125 apartments (87.4% of the total) were permanently occupied, while 12 apartments (8.4%) were seasonally occupied and 6 apartments (4.2%) were empty. As of 2009, the construction rate of new housing units was 4.6 new units per 1000 residents. The vacancy rate for the municipality, in 2010, was 1.01%.

The historical population is given in the following chart:

== Heritage sites of national significance ==
The Farm House De Praz-Derrey (Eca 31) is listed as a Swiss heritage site of national significance.

== Politics ==
In the 2007 federal election the most popular party was the SP which received 25.1% of the vote. The next three most popular parties were the SVP (21.48%), the Green Party (20.78%) and the FDP (12%). In the federal election, a total of 163 votes were cast, and the voter turnout was 54.0%.

== Economy ==
As of 2010, Maracon had an unemployment rate of 2.6%. As of 2008, there were 18 people employed in the primary economic sector and about 8 businesses involved in this sector. 32 people were employed in the secondary sector and there were 3 businesses in this sector. 12 people were employed in the tertiary sector, with 4 businesses in this sector. There were 156 residents of the municipality who were employed in some capacity, of which females made up 41.7% of the workforce.

In 2008 the total number of full-time equivalent jobs was 51. The number of jobs in the primary sector was 13, all of which were in agriculture. The number of jobs in the secondary sector was 30 of which 28 or (93.3%) were in manufacturing and 2 (6.7%) were in construction. The number of jobs in the tertiary sector was 8. In the tertiary sector; 1 was a technical professional or scientist, 3 or 37.5% were in education.

In 2000, there were 13 workers who commuted into the municipality and 108 workers who commuted away. The municipality is a net exporter of workers, with about 8.3 workers leaving the municipality for every one entering. Of the working population, 12% used public transportation to get to work, and 63% used a private car.

== Religion ==
From the 2000 census, 71 or 20.6% were Roman Catholic, while 158 or 45.9% belonged to the Swiss Reformed Church. Of the rest of the population, there was 1 member of an Orthodox church, and there were 54 individuals (or about 15.70% of the population) who belonged to another Christian church. 84 (or about 24.42% of the population) belonged to no church, are agnostic or atheist, and 3 individuals (or about 0.87% of the population) did not answer the question.

== Education ==
In Maracon about 129 or (37.5%) of the population have completed non-mandatory upper secondary education, and 58 or (16.9%) have completed additional higher education (either university or a Fachhochschule). Of the 58 who completed tertiary schooling, 55.2% were Swiss men, 31.0% were Swiss women, 8.6% were non-Swiss men.

In the 2009/2010 school year there were a total of 62 students in the Maracon school district. In the Vaud cantonal school system, two years of non-obligatory pre-school are provided by the political districts. During the school year, the political district provided pre-school care for a total of 665 children of which 232 children (34.9%) received subsidized pre-school care. The canton's primary school program requires students to attend for four years. There were 27 students in the municipal primary school program. The obligatory lower secondary school program lasts for six years and there were 35 students in those schools.

As of 2000, there were 14 students in Maracon who came from another municipality, while 47 residents attended schools outside the municipality.
