= Châtillens =

- Former municipality
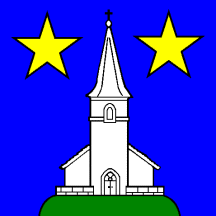
- Flag Coat of arms
- Location of Châtillens
- Location within Switzerland Location within Canton of Vaud
- Coordinates: 46°34′N 06°48′E
- Country: Switzerland
- Canton: Vaud
- District: Lavaux-Oron

Government
  - Mayor: Gérald Wist

Area
  - Total: 2.11 km^{2} (0.81 sq mi)
- Elevation: 625 m (2,051 ft)

Population (2010)
  - Total: 492
  - Density: 233/km^{2} (604/sq mi)
- Demonym(s): Les Châtillannais; Lè Tsatra-Tsin
- Time zone: UTC+01:00 (CET)
  - Summer (DST): UTC+02:00 (CEST)
- Postal code: 1610
- SFOS number: 5783
- ISO 3166 code: CH-VD
- Surrounded by: Oron-la-Ville, Les Tavernes, Forel (Lavaux), Essertes, Vuibroye
- Website: www.chatillens.ch

Châtillens is a former municipality in the district of Lavaux-Oron in the canton of Vaud in Switzerland. The municipalities of Bussigny-sur-Oron, Châtillens, Chesalles-sur-Oron, Ecoteaux, Oron-la-Ville, Oron-le-Châtel, Palézieux, Les Tavernes, Les Thioleyres and Vuibroye merged on 1 January 2012 into the new municipality of Oron.

== History ==
Châtillens is first mentioned in 1141 as Castellens.

== Geography ==
Châtillens has an area, as of 2009, of 2.1 square kilometers (0.81 mi^{2}). Of this area, 1.29 km^{2} (0.50 mi^{2}) or 61.1% is used for agricultural purposes, while 0.58 km^{2} (0.22 mi^{2}) or 27.5% is forested. Of the rest of the land, 0.2 km^{2} (0.077 mi^{2}) or 9.5% is settled (buildings or roads).

Of the built up area, housing and buildings made up 5.2% and transportation infrastructure made up 2.8%. Out of the forested land, 25.6% of the total land area is heavily forested and 1.9% is covered with orchards or small clusters of trees. Of the agricultural land, 47.4% is used for growing crops and 11.8% is pastures, while 1.9% is used for orchards or vine crops.

The municipality was part of the Oron District until it was dissolved on 31 August 2006, and Châtillens became part of the new district of Lavaux-Oron.

The municipality is located along the Lausanne-Bulle road and the Swiss Federal Railways Lausanne-Payerne line. The bridges over the Broye and Grenet rivers are in the municipality.

== Coat of arms ==
The blazon of the municipal coat of arms is Azure, on a Hill Vert a Church Argent between two Mullets of five in chief Or.

== Demographics ==
Châtillens has a population (as of 2010) of 492. As of 2008, 19.1% of the population are resident foreign nationals. Over the last 10 years (1999–2009 ) the population has changed at a rate of 9.6%. It has changed at a rate of -1.2% due to migration and at a rate of 11.8% due to births and deaths.

Most of the population (as of 2000) speaks French (337 or 92.3%), with German being second most common (9 or 2.5%) and Albanian being third (9 or 2.5%). There are 3 people who speak Italian.

The age distribution, as of 2009, in Châtillens is; 68 children or 14.6% of the population are between 0 and 9 years old and 73 teenagers or 15.7% are between 10 and 19. Of the adult population, 51 people or 10.9% of the population are between 20 and 29 years old. 66 people or 14.2% are between 30 and 39, 87 people or 18.7% are between 40 and 49, and 49 people or 10.5% are between 50 and 59. The senior population distribution is 29 people or 6.2% of the population are between 60 and 69 years old, 29 people or 6.2% are between 70 and 79, there are 13 people or 2.8% who are between 80 and 89, and there is 1 person who is 90 and older.

As of 2000, there were 165 people who were single and never married in the municipality. There were 160 married individuals, 22 widows or widowers and 18 individuals who are divorced.

As of 2000 the average number of residents per living room was 0.57 which is about equal to the cantonal average of 0.61 per room. In this case, a room is defined as space of a housing unit of at least 4 m² (43 sq ft) as normal bedrooms, dining rooms, living rooms, kitchens and habitable cellars and attics. About 34.4% of the total households were owner occupied, or in other words did not pay rent (though they may have a mortgage or a rent-to-own agreement).

As of 2000, there were 156 private households in the municipality, and an average of 2.2 persons per household. There were 61 households that consist of only one person and 10 households with five or more people. Out of a total of 164 households that answered this question, 37.2% were households made up of just one person and there was 1 adult who lived with their parents. Of the rest of the households, there are 36 married couples without children, 46 married couples with children There were 10 single parents with a child or children. There were 2 households that were made up of unrelated people and 8 households that were made up of some sort of institution or another collective housing.

In 2000 there were 49 single family homes (or 58.3% of the total) out of a total of 84 inhabited buildings. There were 23 multi-family buildings (27.4%), along with 9 multi-purpose buildings that were mostly used for housing (10.7%) and 3 other use buildings (commercial or industrial) that also had some housing (3.6%).

In 2000, a total of 151 apartments (80.7% of the total) were permanently occupied, while 19 apartments (10.2%) were seasonally occupied and 17 apartments (9.1%) were empty. As of 2009, the construction rate of new housing units was 0 new units per 1000 residents. The vacancy rate for the municipality, in 2010, was 0%.

The historical population is given in the following chart:

== Politics ==
In the 2007 federal election the most popular party was the SP which received 29.57% of the vote. The next three most popular parties were the SVP (22.82%), the FDP (18.09%) and the Green Party (13.51%). In the federal election, a total of 108 votes were cast, and the voter turnout was 41.5%.

== Economy ==
As of 2010, Châtillens had an unemployment rate of 5.9%. As of 2008, there were 10 people employed in the primary economic sector and about 5 businesses involved in this sector. 119 people were employed in the secondary sector and there were 8 businesses in this sector. 48 people were employed in the tertiary sector, with 12 businesses in this sector. There were 180 residents of the municipality who were employed in some capacity, of which females made up 42.2% of the workforce.

In 2008 the total number of full-time equivalent jobs was 156. The number of jobs in the primary sector was 6, all of which were in agriculture. The number of jobs in the secondary sector was 116 of which 108 or (93.1%) were in manufacturing and 9 (7.8%) were in construction. The number of jobs in the tertiary sector was 34. In the tertiary sector; 17 or 50.0% were in the sale or repair of motor vehicles, 1 was in the movement and storage of goods, 7 or 20.6% were in a hotel or restaurant, 1 was in the information industry, 2 or 5.9% were technical professionals or scientists, 4 or 11.8% were in education.

In 2000, there were 57 workers who commuted into the municipality and 135 workers who commuted away. The municipality is a net exporter of workers, with about 2.4 workers leaving the municipality for every one entering. Of the working population, 14.4% used public transportation to get to work, and 60.6% used a private car.

== Religion ==
From the 2000 census, 92 or 25.2% were Roman Catholic, while 152 or 41.6% belonged to the Swiss Reformed Church. Of the rest of the population, there were 8 individuals (or about 2.19% of the population) who belonged to another Christian church. There were 27 (or about 7.40% of the population) who were Islamic. There were 2 individuals who were Buddhist and 1 individual who belonged to another church. 59 (or about 16.16% of the population) belonged to no church, are agnostic or atheist, and 26 individuals (or about 7.12% of the population) did not answer the question.

== Education ==
In Châtillens about 124 or (34.0%) of the population have completed non-mandatory upper secondary education, and 41 or (11.2%) have completed additional higher education (either University or a Fachhochschule). Of the 41 who completed tertiary schooling, 53.7% were Swiss men, 31.7% were Swiss women.

In the 2009/2010 school year there were a total of 80 students in the Châtillens school district. In the Vaud cantonal school system, two years of non-obligatory pre-school are provided by the political districts. During the school year, the political district provided pre-school care for a total of 665 children of which 232 children (34.9%) received subsidized pre-school care. The canton's primary school program requires students to attend for four years. There were 41 students in the municipal primary school program. The obligatory lower secondary school program lasts for six years and there were 39 students in those schools.

As of 2000, there were 19 students in Châtillens who came from another municipality, while 52 residents attended schools outside the municipality.
