= Oron District =

Coordinates: 46°34′N 6°49′E

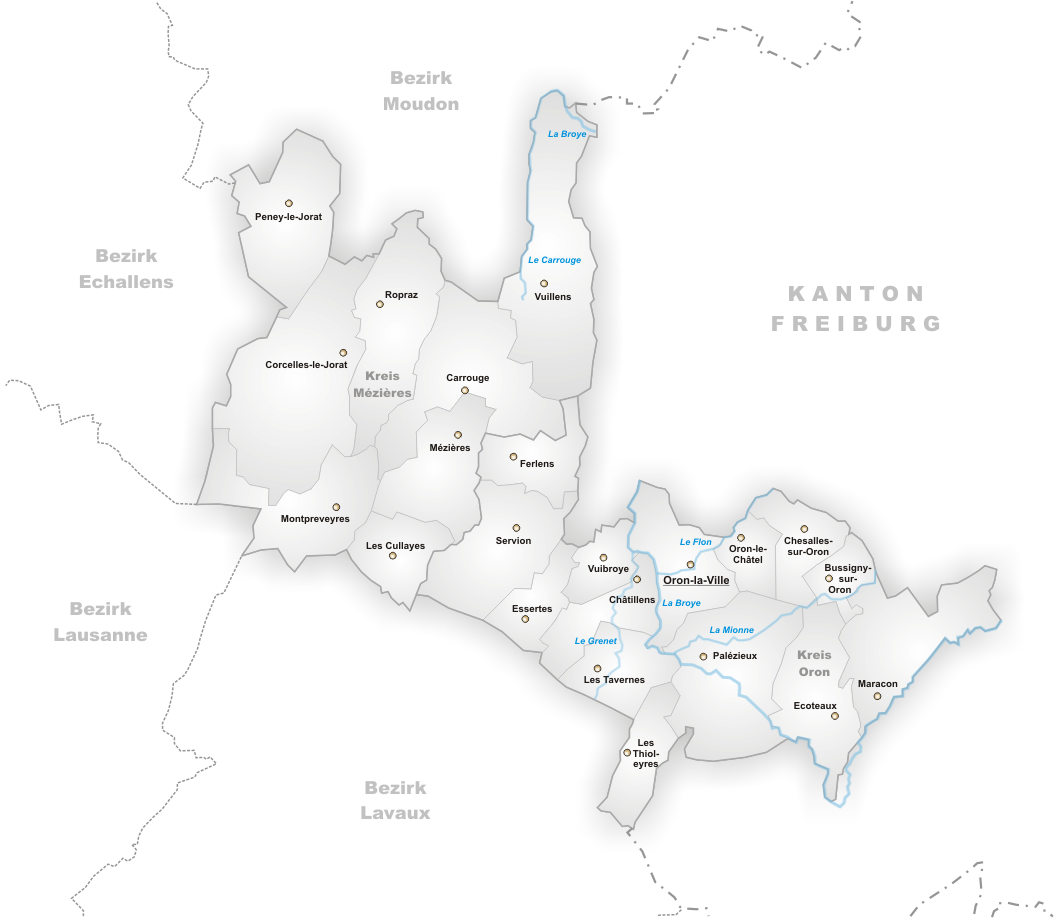
The former district of Oron.

Oron District was one of the districts of the Canton of Vaud, Switzerland.

== Mergers and name changes ==
- On 1 January 2003 the former municipality of La Rogivue merged into the municipality of Maracon.
- On 1 September 2006 the municipalities of Bussigny-sur-Oron, Châtillens, Chesalles-sur-Oron, Les Cullayes, Ecoteaux, Essertes, Ferlens, Maracon, Mézières, Montpreveyres, Oron-la-Ville, Oron-le-Châtel, Palézieux, Servion, Les Tavernes, Les Thioleyres, and Vuibroye came from the District d'Oron to join the Lavaux-Oron District.
- On 1 September 2006 the municipalities of Carrouge, Corcelles-le-Jorat, Ropraz, and Vulliens came from the District d'Oron to join the Broye-Vully District.
- On 1 September 2006 the municipality of Peney-le-Jorat came from the District d'Oron to join the Gros-de-Vaud District.

== Municipalities ==
- Bussigny-sur-Oron
- Carrouge
- Châtillens
- Chesalles-sur-Oron
- Corcelles-le-Jorat
- Ecoteaux
- Essertes
- Ferlens
- La Rogivue
- Les Cullayes
- Les Tavernes
- Les Thioleyres
- Maracon
- Mézières
- Montpreveyres
- Oron-la-Ville
- Oron-le-Châtel
- Palézieux
- Peney-le-Jorat
- Ropraz
- Servion
- Vuibroye
- Vulliens
