= Écoteaux =

- Former municipality
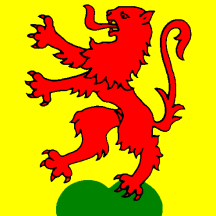
- Flag Coat of arms
- Location of Écoteaux
- Location within Switzerland Location within Canton of Vaud
- Coordinates: 46°33′N 06°52′E
- Country: Switzerland
- Canton: Vaud
- District: Lavaux-Oron

Government
  - Mayor: Anne-Marie Delley

Area
  - Total: 3.55 km^{2} (1.37 sq mi)
- Elevation: 766 m (2,513 ft)

Population (2010)
  - Total: 356
  - Density: 100/km^{2} (260/sq mi)
- Demonym(s): Les Escotaliens; Les Crapauds
- Time zone: UTC+01:00 (CET)
  - Summer (DST): UTC+02:00 (CEST)
- Postal code: 1612
- SFOS number: 5787
- ISO 3166 code: CH-VD
- Surrounded by: Bussigny-sur-Oron, Maracon, Remaufens (FR), Attalens (FR), Bossonnens (FR), Palézieux, Chesalles-sur-Oron
- Website: Profile (in French), SFSO statistics

Écoteaux (French pronunciation: [ekɔto]) is a former municipality in the district of Lavaux-Oron in the canton of Vaud in Switzerland. The municipalities of Bussigny-sur-Oron, Châtillens, Chesalles-sur-Oron, Écoteaux, Oron-la-Ville, Oron-le-Châtel, Palézieux, Les Tavernes, Les Thioleyres and Vuibroye merged on 1 January 2012 into the new municipality of Oron.

== History ==
Écoteaux is first mentioned in 1134 as Escotaux.

== Geography ==
Écoteaux has an area, as of 2009, of 3.6 square kilometers (1.4 mi^{2}). Of this area, 2.75 km^{2} (1.06 mi^{2}) or 77.2% is used for agricultural purposes, while 0.54 km^{2} (0.21 mi^{2}) or 15.2% is forested. Of the rest of the land, 0.26 km^{2} (0.10 mi^{2}) or 7.3% is settled (buildings or roads).

Of the built up area, housing and buildings made up 4.5% and transportation infrastructure made up 2.2%. Out of the forested land, 13.5% of the total land area is heavily forested and 1.7% is covered with orchards or small clusters of trees. Of the agricultural land, 38.8% is used for growing crops and 36.5% is pastures, while 2.0% is used for orchards or vine crops.

The municipality was part of the Oron District until it was dissolved on 31 August 2006, and Écoteaux became part of the new district of Lavaux-Oron.

The municipality is located on the border with the Canton of Fribourg in the foothills of the Alps between the Mionne river to the north and the Broye to the south. It consists of the village of Écoteaux and numerous hamlets.

== Coat of arms ==
The blazon of the municipal coat of arms is Or, on a double-hill Vert a Lion rampant Gules.

== Demographics ==
Écoteaux has a population (as of 2010) of 356. As of 2008, 7.4% of the population are resident foreign nationals. Over the last 10 years (1999–2009 ) the population has changed at a rate of 3.3%. It has changed at a rate of 0.3% due to migration and at a rate of 3% due to births and deaths.

Most of the population (as of 2000) speaks French (307 or 92.7%), with German being second most common (16 or 4.8%) and Portuguese being third (5 or 1.5%). There are 2 people who speak Italian.

The age distribution, as of 2009, in Écoteaux is; 44 children or 12.8% of the population are between 0 and 9 years old and 47 teenagers or 13.7% are between 10 and 19. Of the adult population, 22 people or 6.4% of the population are between 20 and 29 years old. 43 people or 12.5% are between 30 and 39, 53 people or 15.5% are between 40 and 49, and 47 people or 13.7% are between 50 and 59. The senior population distribution is 42 people or 12.2% of the population are between 60 and 69 years old, 30 people or 8.7% are between 70 and 79, there are 13 people or 3.8% who are between 80 and 89, and there are 2 people or 0.6% who are 90 and older.

As of 2000, there were 133 people who were single and never married in the municipality. There were 169 married individuals, 17 widows or widowers and 12 individuals who are divorced.

As of 2000 the average number of residents per living room was 0.55 which is fewer people per room than the cantonal average of 0.61 per room. In this case, a room is defined as space of a housing unit of at least 4 m^{2} (43 sq ft) as normal bedrooms, dining rooms, living rooms, kitchens and habitable cellars and attics. About 63.1% of the total households were owner occupied, or in other words did not pay rent (though they may have a mortgage or a rent-to-own agreement).

As of 2000, there were 134 private households in the municipality, and an average of 2.4 persons per household. There were 37 households that consist of only one person and 9 households with five or more people. Out of a total of 137 households that answered this question, 27.0% were households made up of just one person and there was 1 adult who lived with their parents. Of the rest of the households, there are 46 married couples without children, 45 married couples with children There were 3 single parents with a child or children. There were 2 households that were made up of unrelated people and 3 households that were made up of some sort of institution or another collective housing.

In 2000 there were 60 single family homes (or 55.0% of the total) out of a total of 109 inhabited buildings. There were 16 multi-family buildings (14.7%), along with 30 multi-purpose buildings that were mostly used for housing (27.5%) and 3 other use buildings (commercial or industrial) that also had some housing (2.8%).

In 2000, a total of 130 apartments (86.7% of the total) were permanently occupied, while 15 apartments (10.0%) were seasonally occupied and 5 apartments (3.3%) were empty. As of 2009, the construction rate of new housing units was 0 new units per 1000 residents. The vacancy rate for the municipality, in 2010, was 0%.

The historical population is given in the following chart:

== Politics ==
In the 2007 federal election the most popular party was the SVP which received 32.28% of the vote. The next three most popular parties were the Green Party (24.92%), the SP (14.96%) and the FDP (8.95%). In the federal election, a total of 118 votes were cast, and the voter turnout was 50.9%.

== Economy ==
As of 2010, Écoteaux had an unemployment rate of 3.1%. As of 2008, there were 24 people employed in the primary economic sector and about 12 businesses involved in this sector. 10 people were employed in the secondary sector and there were 4 businesses in this sector. 7 people were employed in the tertiary sector, with 3 businesses in this sector. There were 167 residents of the municipality who were employed in some capacity, of which females made up 42.5% of the workforce.

In 2008 the total number of full-time equivalent jobs was 32. The number of jobs in the primary sector was 19, all of which were in agriculture. The number of jobs in the secondary sector was 8 of which 7 or (87.5%) were in manufacturing and 1 was in construction. The number of jobs in the tertiary sector was 5. In the tertiary sector; 1 was in the sale or repair of motor vehicles, 3 or 60.0% were in a hotel or restaurant, 1 was in education.

In 2000, there were 9 workers who commuted into the municipality and 117 workers who commuted away. The municipality is a net exporter of workers, with about 13.0 workers leaving the municipality for every one entering. Of the working population, 18% used public transportation to get to work, and 58.1% used a private car.

== Religion ==
From the 2000 census, 82 or 24.8% were Roman Catholic, while 183 or 55.3% belonged to the Swiss Reformed Church. Of the rest of the population, there was 1 member of an Orthodox church, and there were 10 individuals (or about 3.02% of the population) who belonged to another Christian church. There was 1 individual who was Islamic. There were 1 individual who belonged to another church. 49 (or about 14.80% of the population) belonged to no church, are agnostic or atheist, and 9 individuals (or about 2.72% of the population) did not answer the question.

== Education ==
In Écoteaux about 134 or (40.5%) of the population have completed non-mandatory upper secondary education, and 56 or (16.9%) have completed additional higher education (either university or a Fachhochschule). Of the 56 who completed tertiary schooling, 58.9% were Swiss men, 37.5% were Swiss women.

In the 2009/2010 school year there were a total of 41 students in the Écoteaux school district. In the Vaud cantonal school system, two years of non-obligatory pre-school are provided by the political districts. During the school year, the political district provided pre-school care for a total of 665 children of which 232 children (34.9%) received subsidized pre-school care. The canton's primary school program requires students to attend for four years. There were 21 students in the municipal primary school program. The obligatory lower secondary school program lasts for six years and there were 20 students in those schools.

As of 2000, there were 15 students in Écoteaux who came from another municipality, while 33 residents attended schools outside the municipality.
