= Palézieux =

- Former municipality
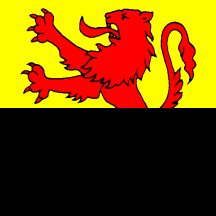
- Flag Coat of arms
- Location of Palézieux
- Location within Switzerland Location within Canton of Vaud
- Coordinates: 46°33′N 06°50′E
- Country: Switzerland
- Canton: Vaud
- District: Lavaux-Oron

Government
  - Mayor: M. Gérald Nidrist

Area
  - Total: 5.77 km^{2} (2.23 sq mi)
- Elevation: 634 m (2,080 ft)

Population (2010)
  - Total: 1,326
  - Density: 230/km^{2} (595/sq mi)
- Demonym(s): Les Paléziens; Les Boudins
- Time zone: UTC+01:00 (CET)
  - Summer (DST): UTC+02:00 (CEST)
- Postal codes: 1607 Palézieux-Village; 1607 Palézieux-Gare
- SFOS number: 5795
- ISO 3166 code: CH-VD
- Localities: Palézieux-Village, Palézieux-Gare, Serix
- Surrounded by: Oron-la-Ville, Oron-le-Châtel, Chesalles-sur-Oron, Ecoteaux, Bossonnens (FR), Granges (Veveyse) (FR), Les Thioleyres, Les Tavernes
- Twin towns: Vers-Pont-du-Gard (France)
- Website: palezieux.ch

Palézieux (French pronunciation: [palezjø]) is a village and former municipality in the district of Lavaux-Oron in the canton of Vaud in Switzerland. Since 2012 it forms part of the municipality of Oron.

== History ==
Palézieux is first mentioned in 1134 as de Palaisol.

Under the rule of Savoy, the family de Palézieux – mentioned in texts from 1154 – had their castle near the village, of which remains can be seen today (mainly a wall). The castle controlled a bridge on the River Broye, which was a source of profit through the various tolls and taxes.

The bridge over the Broye was washed away in 1700, following a flood. It was rebuilt in 1750, following several petitions. Modernized, it is still in place.

The creation of the separate settlement at Palézieux-Gare came about with the commissioning of the railway line between Lausanne and Bern in 1862, which was built away from the original village (which became known as Palézieux-Village). In 1876 the line from Payerne was added, which runs adjacent to Palézieux-Village, and in 1903 the metre gauge line leading to the Gruyère was constructed, with its terminus at Palézieux-Gare.

== Geography ==
Palézieux is located below the confluences of the Broye and the smaller Mionne and Biorde rivers, and has two main settlements: Palézieux-Village and Palézieux-Gare. The Village is situated at an elevation of 634m, and is 1.7 kilometres (1.1 mi) (by road) to the northwest of Palézieux-Gare, which is at 676m. Palézieux-Gare is the smaller settlement but is a notable railway junction, and is named for the railway station there. There is a post office at Palézieux-Gare. The hamlet of Serix, at 660m above sea level, is 1.3 kilometres (0.81 mi) (by road) to the northeast of Palézieux-Village.

The former municipality had an area, as of 2009, of 5.8 square kilometers (2.2 mi^{2}). Of this area, 3.6 km^{2} (1.4 mi^{2}) or 62.3% is used for agricultural purposes, while 1.45 km^{2} (0.56 mi^{2}) or 25.1% is forested. Of the rest of the land, 0.72 km^{2} (0.28 mi^{2}) or 12.5% is settled (buildings or roads), 0.01 km^{2} (2.5 acres) or 0.2% is either rivers or lakes.

Of the built up area, housing and buildings made up 4.8% and transportation infrastructure made up 5.9%. Out of the forested land, 23.2% of the total land area is heavily forested and 1.9% is covered with orchards or small clusters of trees. Of the agricultural land, 44.8% is used for growing crops and 16.6% is pastures. All the water in the municipality is flowing water.

== Local government ==
The municipalities of Bussigny-sur-Oron, Châtillens, Chesalles-sur-Oron, Ecoteaux, Oron-la-Ville, Oron-le-Châtel, Palézieux, Les Tavernes, Les Thioleyres and Vuibroye merged on 1 January 2012 into the new municipality of Oron.

Palézieux was part of the Oron District until that district was dissolved on 31 August 2006, and Palézieux then became part of the new district of Lavaux-Oron.

The former municipality of Palézieux bordered, to the south, the canton of Fribourg.

== Transport ==
There are two railway stations in the former municipality, at Palézieux-Village and Palézieux-Gare. Palézieux-Village station is on the Swiss Federal Railways' Palézieux–Lyss line which then connects with their Lausanne–Bern mainline, at a junction just to the north of Palézieux-Gare. The station at Palézieux-Gare (which is called simply Palézieux) is 20.6 kilometres (12.8 mi) northeast of Lausanne station (by rail) and is also the terminus of the metre gauge Transports publics Fribourgeois (TPF) railway line to the Gruyère. It is possible to travel by train between the two stations in the former municipality, using the hourly S-Bahn/RER service S21.

== Coat of arms ==
The blazon of the municipal coat of arms is Per fess; 1. Or, a Semi-Lion rampant issuant Gules, 2. Sable.

== Demographics ==
Palézieux has a population (as of 2010) of 1,326. The population has grown considerably since the 1970s. As of 2008, 17.8% of the population are resident foreign nationals. During the 10-year period of 1999–2009 the population changed at a rate of 26.6%. It has changed at a rate of 16.8% due to migration and at a rate of 10.7% due to births and deaths.

Most of the population (as of 2000) speaks French (981 or 89.9%), with German being second most common (48 or 4.4%) and Portuguese being third (23 or 2.1%). There are 6 people who speak Italian.

The age distribution, as of 2009, in Palézieux is; 164 children or 12.5% of the population are between 0 and 9 years old and 160 teenagers or 12.2% are between 10 and 19. Of the adult population, 201 people or 15.3% of the population are between 20 and 29 years old. 196 people or 14.9% are between 30 and 39, 204 people or 15.5% are between 40 and 49, and 170 people or 12.9% are between 50 and 59. The senior population distribution is 123 people or 9.4% of the population are between 60 and 69 years old, 64 people or 4.9% are between 70 and 79, there are 25 people or 1.9% who are between 80 and 89, and there are 7 people or 0.5% who are 90 and older.

As of 2000, there were 474 people who were single and never married in the municipality. There were 497 married individuals, 57 widows or widowers and 63 individuals who are divorced.

As of 2000 the average number of residents per living room was 0.65 which is about equal to the cantonal average of 0.61 per room. In this case, a room is defined as space of a housing unit of at least 4 m^{2} (43 sq ft) as normal bedrooms, dining rooms, living rooms, kitchens and habitable cellars and attics. About 28.2% of the total households were owner occupied, or in other words did not pay rent (though they may have a mortgage or a rent-to-own agreement).

As of 2000, there were 433 private households in the municipality, and an average of 2.4 persons per household. There were 142 households that consist of only one person and 44 households with five or more people. Out of a total of 442 households that answered this question, 32.1% were households made up of just one person and there was 1 adult who lived with their parents. Of the rest of the households, there are 112 married couples without children, 139 married couples with children. There were 36 single parents with a child or children. There were 3 households that were made up of unrelated people and 9 households that were made up of some sort of institution or another collective housing.

In 2000 there were 77 single family homes (or 41.4% of the total) out of a total of 186 inhabited buildings. There were 51 multi-family buildings (27.4%), along with 39 multi-purpose buildings that were mostly used for housing (21.0%) and 19 other use buildings (commercial or industrial) that also had some housing (10.2%).

In 2000, a total of 422 apartments (82.9% of the total) were permanently occupied, while 27 apartments (5.3%) were seasonally occupied and 60 apartments (11.8%) were empty. As of 2009, the construction rate of new housing units was 0 new units per 1000 residents. The vacancy rate for the municipality, in 2010, was 0.17%.

The historical population is given in the following chart:

== Twin Town ==
Palézieux is twinned with the town of Vers-Pont-du-Gard, France.

== Politics ==
In the 2007 federal election the most popular party was the SVP which received 29.09% of the vote. The next three most popular parties were the SP (25.75%), the Green Party (19.18%) and the FDP (5.85%). In the federal election, a total of 323 votes were cast, and the voter turnout was 40.2%.

== Economy ==
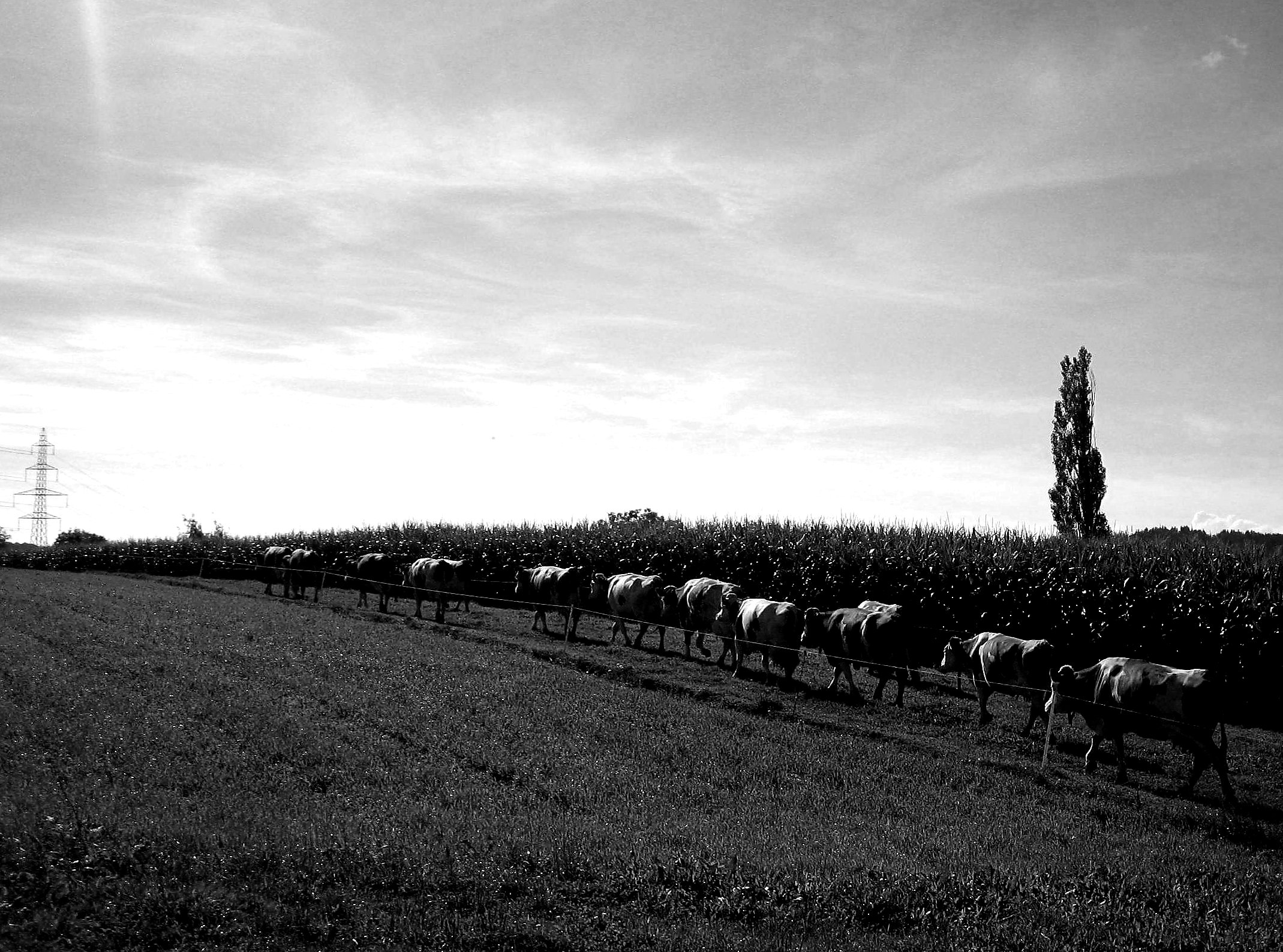
Cattle and fields outside Palézieux-Gare

As of 2010, Palézieux had an unemployment rate of 5.7%. As of 2008, there were 32 people employed in the primary economic sector and about 13 businesses involved in this sector. 289 people were employed in the secondary sector and there were 14 businesses in this sector. 203 people were employed in the tertiary sector, with 35 businesses in this sector. There were 542 residents of the municipality who were employed in some capacity, of which females made up 43.4% of the workforce.

In 2008 the total number of full-time equivalent jobs was 462. The number of jobs in the primary sector was 23, all of which were in agriculture. The number of jobs in the secondary sector was 277 of which 252 or (91.0%) were in manufacturing and 26 (9.4%) were in construction. The number of jobs in the tertiary sector was 162. In the tertiary sector; 69 or 42.6% were in the sale or repair of motor vehicles, 12 or 7.4% were in the movement and storage of goods, 14 or 8.6% were in a hotel or restaurant, 17 or 10.5% were the insurance or financial industry, 6 or 3.7% were technical professionals or scientists, 5 or 3.1% were in education and 33 or 20.4% were in health care.

In 2000, there were 238 workers who commuted into the municipality and 397 workers who commuted away. The municipality is a net exporter of workers, with about 1.7 workers leaving the municipality for every one entering. Of the working population, 22.1% used public transportation to get to work, and 57.7% used a private car.

== Religion ==
From the 2000 census, 283 or 25.9% were Roman Catholic, while 508 or 46.6% belonged to the Swiss Reformed Church. Of the rest of the population, there were 30 members of an Orthodox church (or about 2.75% of the population), there were 2 individuals (or about 0.18% of the population) who belonged to the Christian Catholic Church, and there were 132 individuals (or about 12.10% of the population) who belonged to another Christian church. There was 1 individual who was Jewish, and 41 (or about 3.76% of the population) who were Islamic. There were 5 individuals who were Buddhist and 3 individuals who belonged to another church. 142 (or about 13.02% of the population) belonged to no church, are agnostic or atheist, and 9 individuals (or about 0.82% of the population) did not answer the question.

== Education ==
In Palézieux about 381 or (34.9%) of the population have completed non-mandatory upper secondary education, and 123 or (11.3%) have completed additional higher education (either university or a Fachhochschule). Of the 123 who completed tertiary schooling, 55.3% were Swiss men, 30.9% were Swiss women, 9.8% were non-Swiss men and 4.1% were non-Swiss women.

In the 2009/2010 school year there were a total of 153 students in the Palézieux school district. In the Vaud cantonal school system, two years of non-obligatory pre-school are provided by the political districts. During the school year, the political district provided pre-school care for a total of 665 children of which 232 children (34.9%) received subsidized pre-school care. The canton's primary school program requires students to attend for four years. There were 82 students in the municipal primary school program. The obligatory lower secondary school program lasts for six years and there were 71 students in those schools.

As of 2000, there were 60 students in Palézieux who came from another municipality, while 126 residents attended schools outside the municipality.
