= Les Thioleyres =

- Former municipality
- Coat of arms
- Location of Les Thioleyres
- Location within Switzerland Location within Canton of Vaud
- Coordinates: 46°32′N 06°48′E
- Country: Switzerland
- Canton: Vaud
- District: Lavaux-Oron

Government
  - Mayor: René Brugger

Area
  - Total: 1.93 km^{2} (0.75 sq mi)
- Elevation: 708 m (2,323 ft)

Population (2010)
  - Total: 213
  - Density: 110/km^{2} (286/sq mi)
- Demonym: Les Thiolérus
- Time zone: UTC+01:00 (CET)
  - Summer (DST): UTC+02:00 (CEST)
- Postal code: 1607
- SFOS number: 5801
- ISO 3166 code: CH-VD
- Surrounded by: Les Tavernes, Palézieux, Granges (Veveyse) (FR), Puidoux
- Website: Profile (in French), SFSO statistics

Les Thioleyres (French pronunciation: [le tjɔlɛʁ]) is a former municipality in the district of Lavaux-Oron in the canton of Vaud in Switzerland. The municipalities of Bussigny-sur-Oron, Châtillens, Chesalles-sur-Oron, Ecoteaux, Oron-la-Ville, Oron-le-Châtel, Palézieux, Les Tavernes, Les Thioleyres and Vuibroye merged on 1 January 2012 into the new municipality of Oron.

== Geography ==
Les Thioleyres had an area, as of 2009, of 1.9 square kilometers (0.73 mi^{2}). Of this area, 1.66 km^{2} (0.64 mi^{2}) or 86.0% is used for agricultural purposes, while 0.14 km^{2} (0.054 mi^{2}) or 7.3% is forested. Of the rest of the land, 0.16 km^{2} (0.062 mi^{2}) or 8.3% is settled (buildings or roads).

Of the built up area, housing and buildings made up 4.7% and transportation infrastructure made up 2.6%. Out of the forested land, 3.1% of the total land area is heavily forested and 4.1% is covered with orchards or small clusters of trees. Of the agricultural land, 59.6% is used for growing crops and 25.9% is pastures.

The former municipality was part of the Oron District until it was dissolved on 31 August 2006, and Les Thioleyres became part of the new district of Lavaux-Oron.

== Coat of arms ==
The blazon of the municipal coat of arms is Per pale, 1: Or, two Shovels Gules one and one; 2: Sable, a Crozier Or.

== Demographics ==
Les Thioleyres has a population (as of 2010) of 213. As of 2008, 2.3% of the population are resident foreign nationals. Over the last 10 years (1999–2009) the population has changed at a rate of 27.6%. It has changed at a rate of 15.3% due to migration and at a rate of 12.4% due to births and deaths.

Most of the population (as of 2000) speaks French (168 or 97.7%) with the rest speaking German

The age distribution, as of 2009, in Les Thioleyres is; 34 children or 15.7% of the population are between 0 and 9 years old and 31 teenagers or 14.3% are between 10 and 19. Of the adult population, 27 people or 12.4% of the population are between 20 and 29 years old. 36 people or 16.6% are between 30 and 39, 28 people or 12.9% are between 40 and 49, and 29 people or 13.4% are between 50 and 59. The senior population distribution is 14 people or 6.5% of the population are between 60 and 69 years old, 11 people or 5.1% are between 70 and 79, there are 5 people or 2.3% who are between 80 and 89, and there are 2 people or 0.9% who are 90 and older.

As of 2000, there were 79 people who were single and never married in the municipality. There were 77 married individuals, 9 widows or widowers and 7 individuals who are divorced.

As of 2000 the average number of residents per living room was 0.62 which is about equal to the cantonal average of 0.61 per room. In this case, a room is defined as space of a housing unit of at least 4 m^{2} (43 sq ft) as normal bedrooms, dining rooms, living rooms, kitchens and habitable cellars and attics. About 61.4% of the total households were owner occupied, or in other words did not pay rent (though they may have a mortgage or a rent-to-own agreement).

As of 2000, there were 58 private households in the municipality, and an average of 2.9 persons per household. There were 12 households that consist of only one person and 8 households with five or more people. Out of a total of 63 households that answered this question, 19.0% were households made up of just one person and there were 3 adults who lived with their parents. Of the rest of the households, there are 14 married couples without children, 25 married couples with children There were 3 single parents with a child or children. There was 1 household that was made up of unrelated people and 5 households that were made up of some sort of institution or another collective housing.

In 2000 there were 18 single family homes (or 39.1% of the total) out of a total of 46 inhabited buildings. There were 11 multi-family buildings (23.9%), along with 14 multi-purpose buildings that were mostly used for housing (30.4%) and 3 other use buildings (commercial or industrial) that also had some housing (6.5%).

In 2000, a total of 57 apartments (87.7% of the total) were permanently occupied, while 6 apartments (9.2%) were seasonally occupied and 2 apartments (3.1%) were empty. As of 2009, the construction rate of new housing units was 4.6 new units per 1000 residents. The vacancy rate for the municipality, in 2010, was 0%.

The historical population is given in the following chart:

== Politics ==
In the 2007 federal election the most popular party was the SVP which received 40.22% of the vote. The next three most popular parties were the SP (19.27%), the FDP (13.27%) and the Green Party (11.9%). In the federal election, a total of 62 votes were cast, and the voter turnout was 87.3%.

== Economy ==
As of 2010, Les Thioleyres had an unemployment rate of 3.2%. As of 2008, there were 19 people employed in the primary economic sector and about 8 businesses involved in this sector. 31 people were employed in the secondary sector and there were 3 businesses in this sector. 4 people were employed in the tertiary sector, with 3 businesses in this sector. There were 87 residents of the municipality who were employed in some capacity, of which females made up 40.2% of the workforce.

In 2008 the total number of full-time equivalent jobs was 50. The number of jobs in the primary sector was 17, all of which were in agriculture. The number of jobs in the secondary sector was 30 of which 29 or (96.7%) were in manufacturing and 1 was in construction. The number of jobs in the tertiary sector was 3. In the tertiary sector; 2 or 66.7% were technical professionals or scientists, 1 was in education.

In 2000, there were 22 workers who commuted into the municipality and 55 workers who commuted away. The municipality is a net exporter of workers, with about 2.5 workers leaving the municipality for every one entering. Of the working population, 9.2% used public transportation to get to work, and 58.6% used a private car.

== Religion ==
From the 2000 census, 28 or 16.3% were Roman Catholic, while 119 or 69.2% belonged to the Swiss Reformed Church. Of the rest of the population, there was 1 member of an Orthodox church, and there were 10 individuals (or about 5.81% of the population) who belonged to another Christian church. There was 1 person who was Buddhist. 18 (or about 10.47% of the population) belonged to no church, are agnostic or atheist.

== Education ==
In Les Thioleyres about 62 or (36.0%) of the population have completed non-mandatory upper secondary education, and 15 or (8.7%) have completed additional higher education (either university or a Fachhochschule). Of the 15 who completed tertiary schooling, 33.3% were Swiss men, 60.0% were Swiss women.

In the 2009/2010 school year there were a total of 32 students in the Les Thioleyres school district. In the Vaud cantonal school system, two years of non-obligatory pre-school are provided by the political districts. During the school year, the political district provided pre-school care for a total of 665 children of which 232 children (34.9%) received subsidized pre-school care. The canton's primary school program requires students to attend for four years. There were 17 students in the municipal primary school program. The obligatory lower secondary school program lasts for six years and there were 15 students in those schools.

As of 2000, there were 9 students in Les Thioleyres who came from another municipality, while 29 residents attended schools outside the municipality.
