= Les Tavernes =

- Former municipality
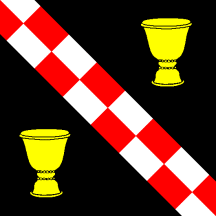
- Flag Coat of arms
- Location of Les Tavernes
- Location within Switzerland Location within Canton of Vaud
- Coordinates: 46°33′N 06°48′E
- Country: Switzerland
- Canton: Vaud
- District: Lavaux-Oron

Government
  - Mayor: Daniel Sonnay

Area
  - Total: 2.29 km^{2} (0.88 sq mi)
- Elevation: 645 m (2,116 ft)

Population (2010)
  - Total: 130
  - Density: 57/km^{2} (150/sq mi)
- Demonym: Lè Djanmâ
- Time zone: UTC+01:00 (CET)
  - Summer (DST): UTC+02:00 (CEST)
- Postal code: 1607
- SFOS number: 5800
- ISO 3166 code: CH-VD
- Surrounded by: Châtillens, Oron-la-Ville, Palézieux, Les Thioleyres, Puidoux, Forel (Lavaux)
- Website: Profile (in French), SFSO statistics

Les Tavernes (French pronunciation: [le tavɛʁn]) is a former municipality in the district of Lavaux-Oron in the canton of Vaud in Switzerland. The municipalities of Bussigny-sur-Oron, Châtillens, Chesalles-sur-Oron, Ecoteaux, Oron-la-Ville, Oron-le-Châtel, Palézieux, Les Tavernes, Les Thioleyres and Vuibroye merged on 1 January 2012 into the new municipality of Oron.

== Geography ==
Les Tavernes had an area, as of 2009, of 2.3 square kilometers (0.89 mi^{2}). Of this area, 1.65 km^{2} (0.64 mi^{2}) or 72.1% is used for agricultural purposes, while 0.51 km^{2} (0.20 mi^{2}) or 22.3% is forested. Of the rest of the land, 0.09 km^{2} (22 acres) or 3.9% is settled (buildings or roads), 0.04 km^{2} (9.9 acres) or 1.7% is either rivers or lakes.

Of the built up area, housing and buildings made up 2.6% and transportation infrastructure made up 1.3%. Out of the forested land, all of the forested land area is covered with heavy forests. Of the agricultural land, 46.3% is used for growing crops and 24.5% is pastures, while 1.3% is used for orchards or vine crops. All the water in the municipality is flowing water.

The former municipality was part of the Oron District until it was dissolved on 31 August 2006, and Les Tavernes became part of the new district of Lavaux-Oron.

== Coat of arms ==
The blazon of the municipal coat of arms is Sable, a Bend lozengy Argent and Gules between two Cups Or.

== Demographics ==
Les Tavernes had a population (as of 2010) of 130. As of 2008, 7.1% of the population are resident foreign nationals. Over the last 10 years (1999–2009 ) the population has changed at a rate of 18.3%. It has changed at a rate of 11.9% due to migration and at a rate of 6.4% due to births and deaths.

Most of the population (as of 2000) speaks French (119 or 97.5%), with German being second most common (2 or 1.6%) and Portuguese being third (1 or 0.8%).

The age distribution, as of 2009, in Les Tavernes is; 16 children or 12.4% of the population are between 0 and 9 years old and 18 teenagers or 14.0% are between 10 and 19. Of the adult population, 13 people or 10.1% of the population are between 20 and 29 years old. 14 people or 10.9% are between 30 and 39, 23 people or 17.8% are between 40 and 49, and 10 people or 7.8% are between 50 and 59. The senior population distribution is 12 people or 9.3% of the population are between 60 and 69 years old, 19 people or 14.7% are between 70 and 79, there are 4 people or 3.1% who are between 80 and 89.

As of 2000, there were 51 people who were single and never married in the municipality. There were 60 married individuals, 6 widows or widowers and 5 individuals who are divorced.

As of 2000 the average number of residents per living room was 0.62 which is about equal to the cantonal average of 0.61 per room. In this case, a room is defined as space of a housing unit of at least 4 m² (43 sq ft) as normal bedrooms, dining rooms, living rooms, kitchens and habitable cellars and attics. About 59.5% of the total households were owner occupied, or in other words did not pay rent (though they may have a mortgage or a rent-to-own agreement).

As of 2000, there were 40 private households in the municipality, and an average of 3. persons per household. There were 6 households that consist of only one person and 6 households with five or more people. Out of a total of 42 households that answered this question, 14.3% were households made up of just one person and there was 1 adult who lived with their parents. Of the rest of the households, there are 14 married couples without children, 17 married couples with children There was one single parent with a child or children. There was 1 household that was made up of unrelated people and 2 households that were made up of some sort of institution or another collective housing.

In 2000 there were 12 single family homes (or 38.7% of the total) out of a total of 31 inhabited buildings. There were 3 multi-family buildings (9.7%) and along with 16 multi-purpose buildings that were mostly used for housing (51.6%).

In 2000, a total of 37 apartments (90.2% of the total) were permanently occupied, while 3 apartments (7.3%) were seasonally occupied and one apartment was empty. As of 2009, the construction rate of new housing units was 0 new units per 1000 residents. The vacancy rate for the municipality, in 2010, was 0%.

The historical population is given in the following chart:

== Heritage sites of national significance ==
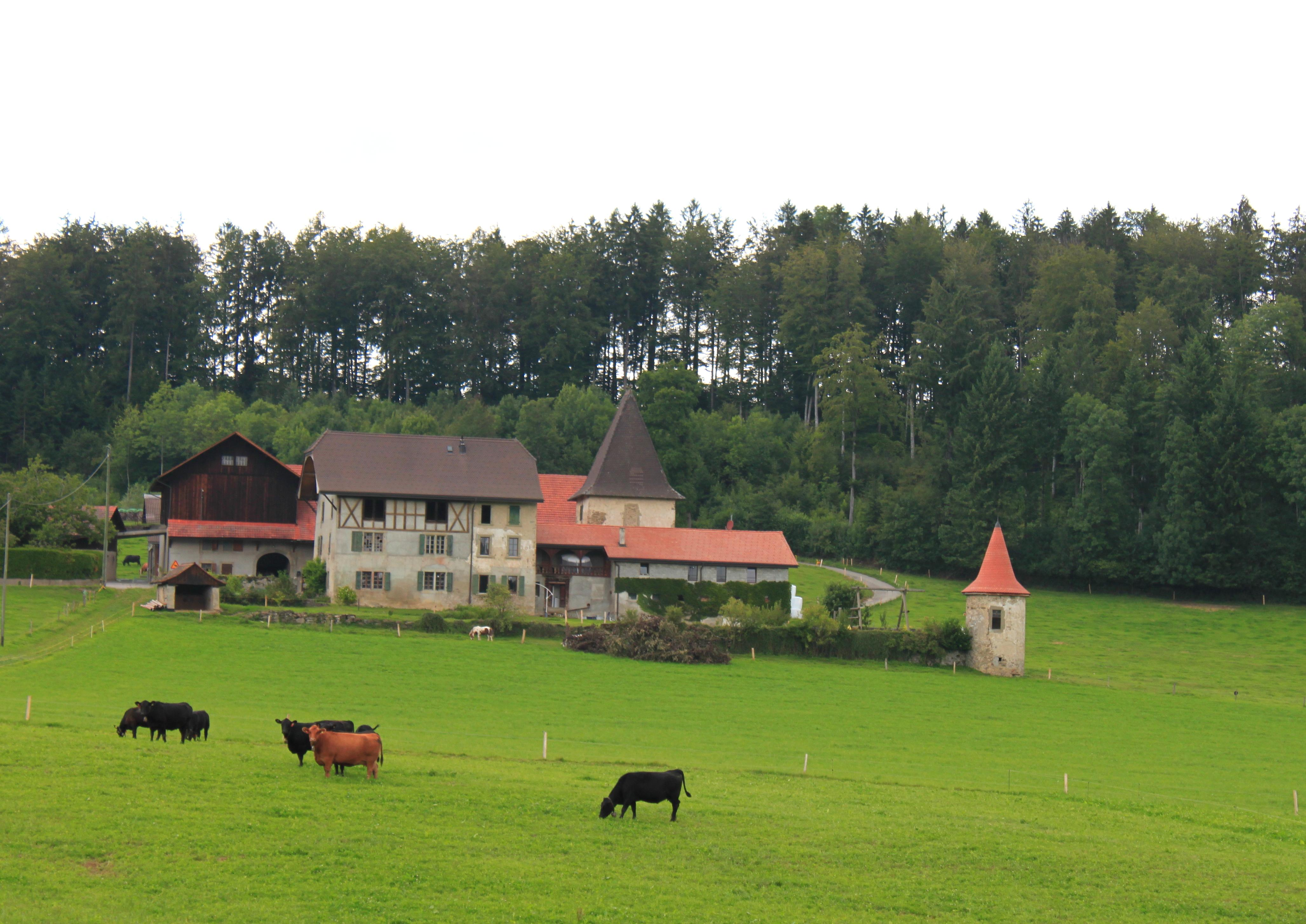
De Haut Crêt Abbey

The De Haut Crêt, a Cistercian abbey is listed as a Swiss heritage site of national significance.

== Politics ==
In the 2007 federal election the most popular party was the SVP which received 42.11% of the vote. The next three most popular parties were the FDP (26.19%), the LPS Party (7.27%) and the SP (7.14%). In the federal election, a total of 45 votes were cast, and the voter turnout was 56.3%.

== Economy ==
As of 2010, Les Tavernes had an unemployment rate of 1.2%. As of 2008, there were 22 people employed in the primary economic sector and about 8 businesses involved in this sector. 27 people were employed in the secondary sector and there were 2 businesses in this sector. 5 people were employed in the tertiary sector, with 3 businesses in this sector. There were 58 residents of the municipality who were employed in some capacity, of which females made up 36.2% of the workforce.

In 2008 the total number of full-time equivalent jobs was 45. The number of jobs in the primary sector was 14, all of which were in agriculture. The number of jobs in the secondary sector was 27, all of which were in construction. The number of jobs in the tertiary sector was 4. In the tertiary sector; 3 or 75.0% were technical professionals or scientists, 1 was in education.

In 2000, there were 11 workers who commuted into the municipality and 30 workers who commuted away. The municipality is a net exporter of workers, with about 2.7 workers leaving the municipality for every one entering. Of the working population, 19% used public transportation to get to work, and 36.2% used a private car.

== Religion ==
From the 2000 census, 17 or 13.9% were Roman Catholic, while 74 or 60.7% belonged to the Swiss Reformed Church. Of the rest of the population, there was 1 member of an Orthodox church, and there were 10 individuals (or about 8.20% of the population) who belonged to another Christian church. 17 (or about 13.93% of the population) belonged to no church, are agnostic or atheist, and 8 individuals (or about 6.56% of the population) did not answer the question.

== Education ==
In Les Tavernes about 44 or (36.1%) of the population have completed non-mandatory upper secondary education, and 14 or (11.5%) have completed additional higher education (either university or a Fachhochschule). Of the 14 who completed tertiary schooling, 57.1% were Swiss men, 21.4% were Swiss women.

In the 2009/2010 school year there were a total of 19 students in the Les Tavernes school district. In the Vaud cantonal school system, two years of non-obligatory pre-school are provided by the political districts. During the school year, the political district provided pre-school care for a total of 665 children of which 232 children (34.9%) received subsidized pre-school care. The canton's primary school program requires students to attend for four years. There were 11 students in the municipal primary school program. The obligatory lower secondary school program lasts for six years and there were 8 students in those schools.

As of 2000, there were 15 students in Les Tavernes who came from another municipality, while 20 residents attended schools outside the municipality.
