= Oron family =

Coat of arms of the Oron family

The Oron family is an old Swiss noble family.

== History ==
The family built the Oron Castle in the 12th or 13th century. Rodolphe 1st of Oron was Lord of Oron, Bossonnens and Attalens. Pierre of Oron was Bishop of Sion between 1275 and 1287. Another Pierre of Oron was Bishop of Lausanne between 1313 and 1323.
