= Oron-la-Ville =

- Former municipality
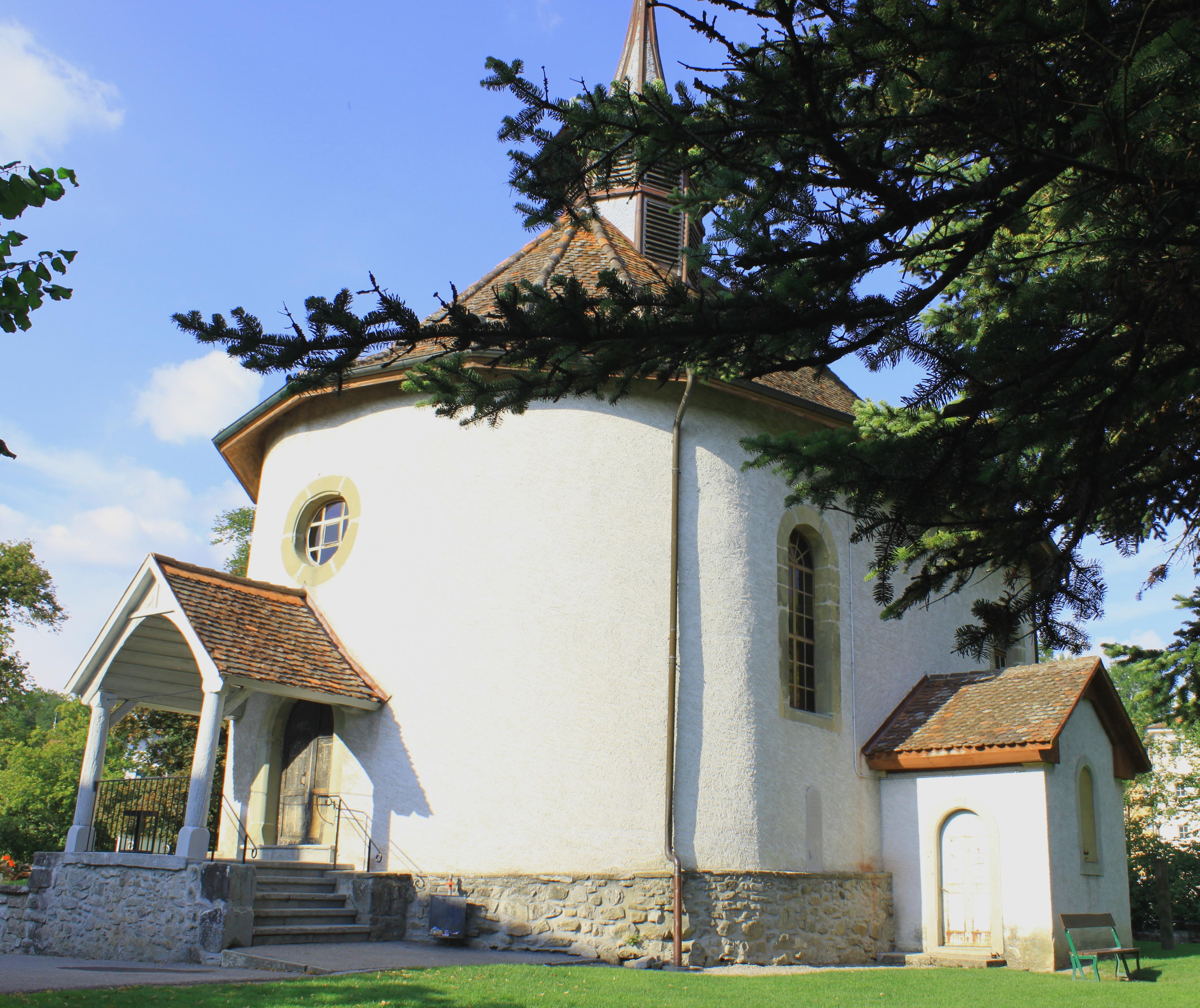
- Oron-la-Ville Reformed Temple

- Coat of arms
- Location of Oron-la-Ville
- Location within Switzerland Location within Canton of Vaud
- Coordinates: 46°34′N 6°50′E
- Country: Switzerland
- Canton: Vaud
- District: Lavaux-Oron

Area
  - Total: 3.11 km^{2} (1.20 sq mi)
- Elevation: 631 m (2,070 ft)

Population (December 2010)
  - Total: 1,438
  - Density: 462/km^{2} (1,200/sq mi)
- Demonym(s): Oronais, Oronaises
- Time zone: UTC+01:00 (CET)
  - Summer (DST): UTC+02:00 (CEST)
- Postal code: 1610
- SFOS number: 5793
- ISO 3166 code: CH-VD
- Surrounded by: Auboranges (FR), Chapelle (Glâne) (FR), Châtillens, Les Tavernes, Oron-le-Châtel, Palézieux, Rue (FR), Vuibroye
- Twin towns: Bussac (France)
- Website: www.oron-la-ville.ch

Oron-la-Ville (French pronunciation: [ɔʁɔ̃ la vil]) is a small town and former municipality in the district of Lavaux-Oron in the canton of Vaud in Switzerland. The municipalities of Bussigny-sur-Oron, Châtillens, Chesalles-sur-Oron, Ecoteaux, Oron-la-Ville, Oron-le-Châtel, Palézieux, Les Tavernes, Les Thioleyres and Vuibroye merged on 1 January 2012 into the new municipality of Oron.

== History ==
Oron-la-Ville is first mentioned about 280 as Uromago. In 1018 it was mentioned as Auronum.

== Geography ==
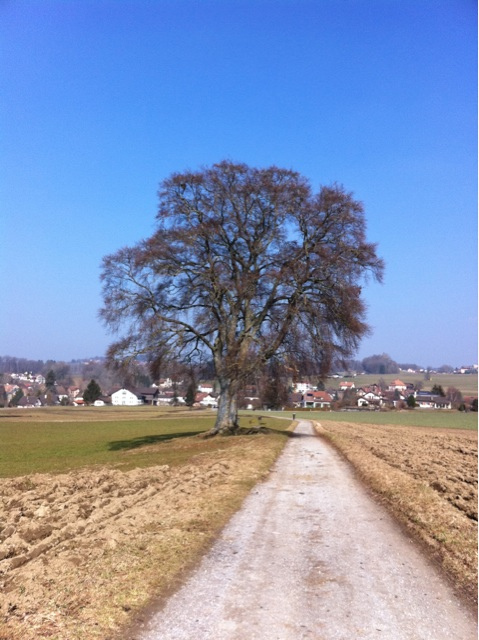
Fields outside Oron-la-Ville

Oron-la-Ville has an area, as of 2009, of 3.1 square kilometers (1.2 mi^{2}). Of this area, 2.06 km^{2} (0.80 mi^{2}) or 66.5% is used for agricultural purposes, while 0.39 km^{2} (0.15 mi^{2}) or 12.6% is forested. Of the rest of the land, 0.59 km^{2} (0.23 mi^{2}) or 19.0% is settled (buildings or roads), 0.02 km^{2} (4.9 acres) or 0.6% is either rivers or lakes and 0.01 km^{2} (2.5 acres) or 0.3% is unproductive land.

Of the built up area, housing and buildings made up 11.9% and transportation infrastructure made up 4.8%. Out of the forested land, all of the forested land area is covered with heavy forests. Of the agricultural land, 50.6% is used for growing crops and 13.2% is pastures, while 2.6% is used for orchards or vine crops. All the water in the municipality is flowing water.

The municipality was part of the Oron District until it was dissolved on 31 August 2006, and Oron-la-Ville became part of the new district of Lavaux-Oron.

The municipality is located along the right bank of the Broye in the eastern part of the Jorat region.

== Coat of arms ==
The blazon of the municipal coat of arms is Gules, a Crescent increscent Or.

== Demographics ==
Oron-la-Ville has a population (as of 2010) of 1,438. As of 2008, 19.7% of the population are resident foreign nationals. Over the last 10 years (1999–2009) the population has changed at a rate of 19.3%. It has changed at a rate of 26.3% due to migration and at a rate of -5.9% due to births and deaths.

Most of the population (as of 2000) speaks French (1,105 or 90.3%), with German being second most common (39 or 3.2%) and Portuguese being third (29 or 2.4%). There are 16 people who speak Italian.

The age distribution, as of 2009, in Oron-la-Ville is; 168 children or 12.0% of the population are between 0 and 9 years old and 180 teenagers or 12.9% are between 10 and 19. Of the adult population, 152 people or 10.9% of the population are between 20 and 29 years old. 182 people or 13.0% are between 30 and 39, 214 people or 15.3% are between 40 and 49, and 157 people or 11.2% are between 50 and 59. The senior population distribution is 157 people or 11.2% of the population are between 60 and 69 years old, 91 people or 6.5% are between 70 and 79, there are 73 people or 5.2% who are between 80 and 89, and there are 22 people or 1.6% who are 90 and older.

As of 2000, there were 490 people who were single and never married in the municipality. There were 546 married individuals, 119 widows or widowers and 69 individuals who are divorced.

As of 2000 the average number of residents per living room was 0.58 which is about equal to the cantonal average of 0.61 per room. In this case, a room is defined as space of a housing unit of at least 4 m^{2} (43 sq ft) as normal bedrooms, dining rooms, living rooms, kitchens and habitable cellars and attics. About 37.2% of the total households were owner occupied, or in other words did not pay rent (though they may have a mortgage or a rent-to-own agreement).

As of 2000, there were 494 private households in the municipality, and an average of 2.3 persons per household. There were 167 households that consist of only one person and 28 households with five or more people. Out of a total of 507 households that answered this question, 32.9% were households made up of just one person. Of the rest of the households, there are 135 married couples without children, 152 married couples with children There were 32 single parents with a child or children. There were 8 households that were made up of unrelated people and 13 households that were made up of some sort of institution or another collective housing.

In 2000 there were 92 single family homes (or 40.0% of the total) out of a total of 230 inhabited buildings. There were 65 multi-family buildings (28.3%), along with 54 multi-purpose buildings that were mostly used for housing (23.5%) and 19 other use buildings (commercial or industrial) that also had some housing (8.3%).

In 2000, a total of 471 apartments (88.2% of the total) were permanently occupied, while 37 apartments (6.9%) were seasonally occupied and 26 apartments (4.9%) were empty. As of 2009, the construction rate of new housing units was 2.9 new units per 1000 residents. The vacancy rate for the municipality, in 2010, was 0.49%.

The historical population is given in the following chart:

== Heritage sites of national significance ==
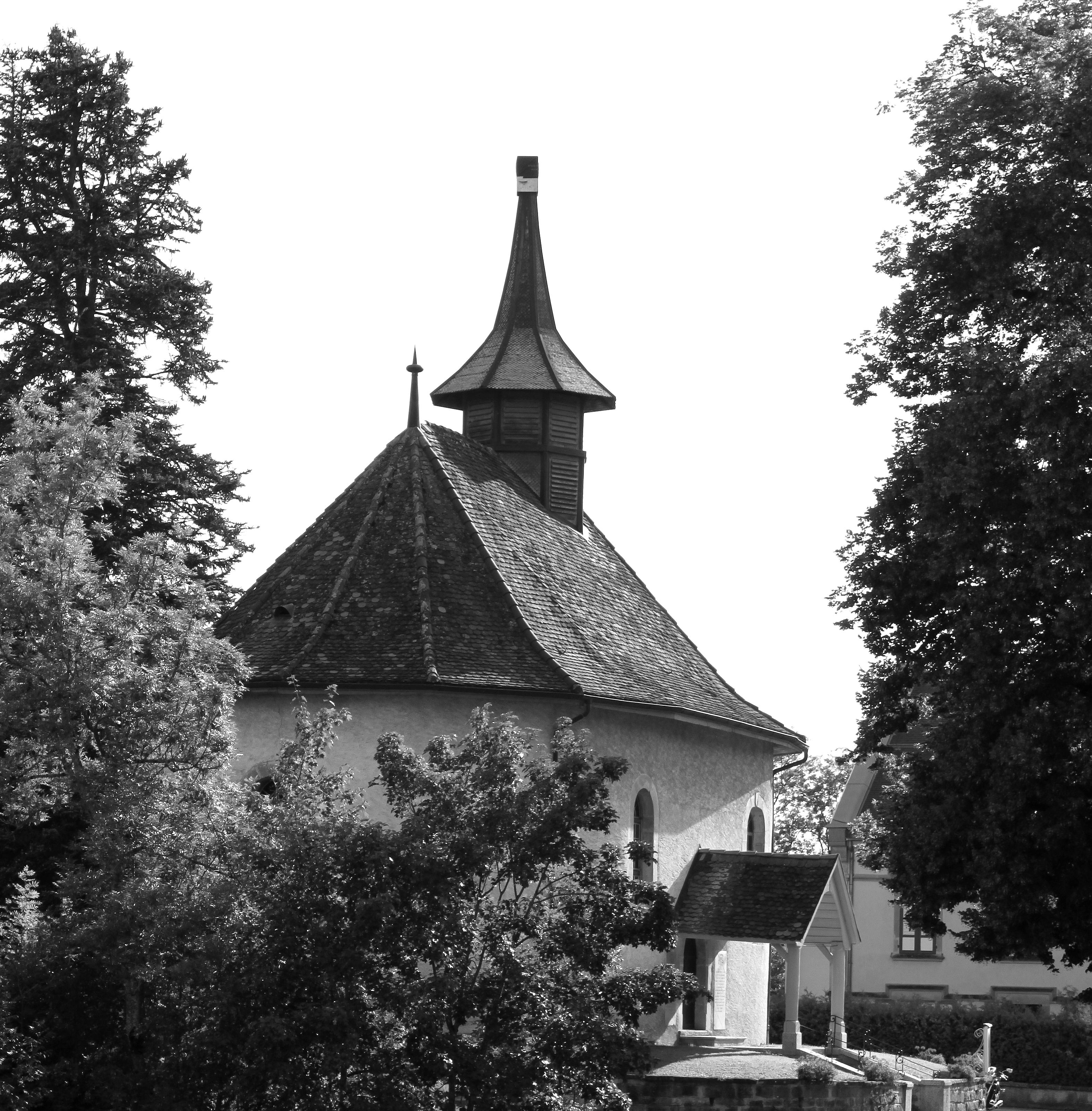
Temple of Oron-la-Ville

The Temple of Oron-la-Ville is listed as a Swiss heritage site of national significance.

== International relations ==
=== Twin towns – Sister cities ===
Oron-la-Ville is twinned with:

- Bussac-sur-Charente, France

== Politics ==
In the 2007 federal election the most popular party was the SVP which received 29.15% of the vote. The next three most popular parties were the SP (18.01%), the Green Party (16.46%) and the FDP (12.61%). In the federal election, a total of 338 votes were cast, and the voter turnout was 94.4%.

== Economy ==
As of 2010, Oron-la-Ville had an unemployment rate of 5%. As of 2008, there were 15 people employed in the primary economic sector and about 6 businesses involved in this sector. 178 people were employed in the secondary sector and there were 15 businesses in this sector. 595 people were employed in the tertiary sector, with 83 businesses in this sector. There were 568 residents of the municipality who were employed in some capacity, of which females made up 43.8% of the workforce.

In 2008 the total number of full-time equivalent jobs was 633. The number of jobs in the primary sector was 12, of which 10 were in agriculture and 2 were in forestry or lumber production. The number of jobs in the secondary sector was 168 of which 128 or (76.2%) were in manufacturing and 41 (24.4%) were in construction. The number of jobs in the tertiary sector was 453. In the tertiary sector; 173 or 38.2% were in the sale or repair of motor vehicles, 23 or 5.1% were in the movement and storage of goods, 15 or 3.3% were in a hotel or restaurant, 1 was in the information industry, 12 or 2.6% were the insurance or financial industry, 18 or 4.0% were technical professionals or scientists, 41 or 9.1% were in education and 116 or 25.6% were in health care.

In 2000, there were 515 workers who commuted into the municipality and 330 workers who commuted away. The municipality is a net importer of workers, with about 1.6 workers entering the municipality for every one leaving. Of the working population, 11.3% used public transportation to get to work, and 60.4% used a private car.

== Religion ==
From the 2000 census, 384 or 31.4% were Roman Catholic, while 553 or 45.2% belonged to the Swiss Reformed Church. Of the rest of the population, there were 8 members of an Orthodox church (or about 0.65% of the population), and there were 152 individuals (or about 12.42% of the population) who belonged to another Christian church. There were 26 (or about 2.12% of the population) who were Islamic. There were 2 individuals who were Buddhist, 2 individuals who were Hindu and 1 individual who belonged to another church. 113 (or about 9.23% of the population) belonged to no church, are agnostic or atheist, and 58 individuals (or about 4.74% of the population) did not answer the question.

== Education ==
In Oron-la-Ville about 452 or (36.9%) of the population have completed non-mandatory upper secondary education, and 123 or (10.0%) have completed additional higher education (either university or a Fachhochschule). Of the 123 who completed tertiary schooling, 61.8% were Swiss men, 22.8% were Swiss women, 8.1% were non-Swiss men and 7.3% were non-Swiss women.

In the 2009/2010 school year there were a total of 182 students in the Oron-la-Ville school district. In the Vaud cantonal school system, two years of non-obligatory pre-school are provided by the political districts. During the school year, the political district provided pre-school care for a total of 665 children of which 232 children (34.9%) received subsidized pre-school care. The canton's primary school program requires students to attend for four years. There were 92 students in the municipal primary school program. The obligatory lower secondary school program lasts for six years and there were 90 students in those schools.

As of 2000, there were 203 students in Oron-la-Ville who came from another municipality, while 84 residents attended schools outside the municipality.
