= Chesalles-sur-Oron =

- Former municipality
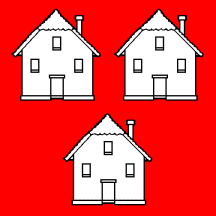
- Flag Coat of arms
- Location of Chesalles-sur-Oron
- Location within Switzerland Location within Canton of Vaud
- Coordinates: 46°34′N 06°51′E
- Country: Switzerland
- Canton: Vaud
- District: Lavaux-Oron

Government
  - Mayor: Michel Jaquet

Area
  - Total: 2.00 km^{2} (0.77 sq mi)
- Elevation: 788 m (2,585 ft)

Population (2010)
  - Total: 189
  - Density: 94.5/km^{2} (245/sq mi)
- Demonym: Les Groseilles
- Time zone: UTC+01:00 (CET)
  - Summer (DST): UTC+02:00 (CEST)
- Postal code: 1608
- SFOS number: 5784
- ISO 3166 code: CH-VD
- Surrounded by: Le Flon (FR), Saint-Martin (FR), Bussigny-sur-Oron, Ecoteaux, Palézieux, Oron-le-Châtel, Chapelle (Glâne) (FR)
- Website: Profile (in French), SFSO statistics

Chesalles-sur-Oron is a former municipality in the district of Lavaux-Oron in the canton of Vaud in Switzerland. The municipalities of Bussigny-sur-Oron, Châtillens, Chesalles-sur-Oron, Ecoteaux, Oron-la-Ville, Oron-le-Châtel, Palézieux, Les Tavernes, Les Thioleyres and Vuibroye merged on 1 January 2012 into the new municipality of Oron.

== Geography ==
Chesalles-sur-Oron had an area, as of 2009, of 2 square kilometers (0.77 mi^{2}). Of this area, 1.47 km^{2} (0.57 mi^{2}) or 73.5% is used for agricultural purposes, while 0.36 km^{2} (0.14 mi^{2}) or 18.0% is forested. Of the rest of the land, 0.18 km^{2} (0.069 mi^{2}) or 9.0% is settled (buildings or roads).

Of the built up area, housing and buildings made up 5.0% and transportation infrastructure made up 3.5%. Out of the forested land, all of the forested land area is covered with heavy forests. Of the agricultural land, 36.5% is used for growing crops and 36.0% is pastures.

The municipality was part of the Oron District until it was dissolved on 31 August 2006, and Chesalles-sur-Oron became part of the new district of Lavaux-Oron.

The former municipality is located on the border with the Canton of Fribourg along the Lausanne-Bulle highway.

== Coat of arms ==
The blazon of the municipal coat of arms is Gules, three Houses two and one Argent.

== Demographics ==
Chesalles-sur-Oron had a population (as of 2010) of 189. As of 2008, 18.2% of the population are resident foreign nationals. Over the last 10 years (1999–2009) the population has changed at a rate of 16.7%. It has changed at a rate of 17.9% due to migration and at a rate of -1.9% due to births and deaths.

Most of the population (as of 2000) speaks French (141 or 95.3%), with German being second most common (6 or 4.1%) and Dutch being third (1 or 0.7%).

The age distribution, as of 2009, in Chesalles-sur-Oron is; 16 children or 8.5% of the population are between 0 and 9 years old and 25 teenagers or 13.2% are between 10 and 19. Of the adult population, 26 people or 13.8% of the population are between 20 and 29 years old. 32 people or 16.9% are between 30 and 39, 33 people or 17.5% are between 40 and 49, and 18 people or 9.5% are between 50 and 59. The senior population distribution is 17 people or 9.0% of the population are between 60 and 69 years old, 12 people or 6.3% are between 70 and 79, there are 10 people or 5.3% who are between 80 and 89.

As of 2000, there were 64 people who were single and never married in the municipality. There were 77 married individuals, 4 widows or widowers and 3 individuals who are divorced.

As of 2000 the average number of residents per living room was 0.54 which is fewer people per room than the cantonal average of 0.61 per room. In this case, a room is defined as space of a housing unit of at least 4 m^{2} (43 sq ft) as normal bedrooms, dining rooms, living rooms, kitchens and habitable cellars and attics. About 60.7% of the total households were owner occupied, or in other words did not pay rent (though they may have a mortgage or a rent-to-own agreement).

As of 2000, there were 56 private households in the municipality, and an average of 2.6 persons per household. There were 13 households that consist of only one person and 5 households with five or more people. Out of a total of 57 households that answered this question, 22.8% were households made up of just one person. Of the rest of the households, there are 14 married couples without children, 25 married couples with children. There were 4 single parents with a child or children.

In 2000 there were 30 single family homes (or 63.8% of the total) out of a total of 47 inhabited buildings. There were 4 multi-family buildings (8.5%), along with 11 multi-purpose buildings that were mostly used for housing (23.4%) and 2 other use buildings (commercial or industrial) that also had some housing (4.3%).

In 2000, a total of 56 apartments (91.8% of the total) were permanently occupied, while 3 apartments (4.9%) were seasonally occupied and 2 apartments (3.3%) were empty. As of 2009, the construction rate of new housing units was 42.3 new units per 1000 residents. The vacancy rate for the municipality, in 2010, was 1.12%.

The historical population is given in the following chart:

== Politics ==
In the 2007 federal election the most popular party was the SVP which received 47.54% of the vote. The next three most popular parties were the SP (13.66%), the LPS Party (11.69%) and the FDP (10.05%). In the federal election, a total of 53 votes were cast, and the voter turnout was 46.5%.

== Economy ==
As of 2010, Chesalles-sur-Oron had an unemployment rate of 3.2%. As of 2008, there were 20 people employed in the primary economic sector and about 8 businesses involved in this sector. 13 people were employed in the secondary sector and there were 4 businesses in this sector. 5 people were employed in the tertiary sector, with 2 businesses in this sector. There were 83 residents of the municipality who were employed in some capacity, of which females made up 32.5% of the workforce.

In 2008 the total number of full-time equivalent jobs was 30. The number of jobs in the primary sector was 15, all of which were in agriculture. The number of jobs in the secondary sector was 11 of which 9 or (81.8%) were in manufacturing and 2 (18.2%) were in construction. The number of jobs in the tertiary sector was 4. In the tertiary sector; 1 was in the sale or repair of motor vehicles, 3 or 75.0% were in education.

In 2000, there were 13 workers who commuted into the municipality and 57 workers who commuted away. The municipality is a net exporter of workers, with about 4.4 workers leaving the municipality for every one entering. Of the working population, 9.6% used public transportation to get to work, and 61.4% used a private car.

== Religion ==
From the 2000 census, 61 or 41.2% were Roman Catholic, while 59 or 39.9% belonged to the Swiss Reformed Church. Of the rest of the population, there was 1 individual who belongs to another Christian church. There were 1 individual who belonged to another church. 24 (or about 16.22% of the population) belonged to no church, are agnostic or atheist, and 2 individuals (or about 1.35% of the population) did not answer the question.

== Education ==
In Chesalles-sur-Oron about 67 or (45.3%) of the population have completed non-mandatory upper secondary education, and 17 or (11.5%) have completed additional higher education (either University or a Fachhochschule). Of the 17 who completed tertiary schooling, 94.1% were Swiss men, 5.9% were Swiss women.

In the 2009/2010 school year there were a total of 19 students in the Chesalles-sur-Oron school district. In the Vaud cantonal school system, two years of non-obligatory pre-school are provided by the political districts. During the school year, the political district provided pre-school care for a total of 665 children of which 232 children (34.9%) received subsidized pre-school care. The canton's primary school program requires students to attend for four years. There were 11 students in the municipal primary school program. The obligatory lower secondary school program lasts for six years and there were 8 students in those schools.

As of 2000, there were 29 students in Chesalles-sur-Oron who came from another municipality, while 23 residents attended schools outside the municipality.
