= Bussigny-sur-Oron =

- Former municipality
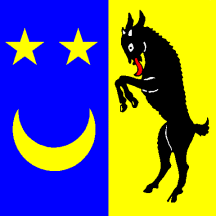
- Flag Coat of arms
- Location of Bussigny-sur-Oron
- Location within Switzerland Location within Canton of Vaud
- Coordinates: 46°34′N 06°51′E
- Country: Switzerland
- Canton: Vaud
- District: Lavaux-Oron

Government
  - Mayor: Raymond Casellini

Area
  - Total: 1.17 km^{2} (0.45 sq mi)
- Elevation: 769 m (2,523 ft)

Population (2010)
  - Total: 77
  - Density: 66/km^{2} (170/sq mi)
- Demonym: Les Cabris
- Time zone: UTC+01:00 (CET)
  - Summer (DST): UTC+02:00 (CEST)
- Postal code: 1607
- SFOS number: 5781
- ISO 3166 code: CH-VD
- Surrounded by: Saint-Martin (FR), Maracon, Ecoteaux, Chesalles-sur-Oron
- Website: Profile (in French), SFSO statistics

Bussigny-sur-Oron (French pronunciation: [bysiɲi syʁ ɔʁɔ̃]) is a former municipality in the district of Lavaux-Oron of the Canton of Vaud, Switzerland. The municipalities of Bussigny-sur-Oron, Châtillens, Chesalles-sur-Oron, Ecoteaux, Oron-la-Ville, Oron-le-Châtel, Palézieux, Les Tavernes, Les Thioleyres and Vuibroye merged on 1 January 2012 into the new municipality of Oron.

== History ==
Bussigny-sur-Oron is first mentioned in 1433 as Bussignye. In 1517 it was mentioned in a land registry of Count Jean II de Gruyère.

== Geography ==
Bussigny-sur-Oron has an area, as of 2009, of 1.2 square kilometers (0.46 mi^{2}). Of this area, 0.92 km^{2} (0.36 mi^{2}) or 79.3% is used for agricultural purposes, while 0.16 km^{2} (0.062 mi^{2}) or 13.8% is forested. Of the rest of the land, 0.1 km^{2} (25 acres) or 8.6% is settled (buildings or roads).

Of the built up area, housing and buildings made up 3.4% and transportation infrastructure made up 4.3%. Out of the forested land, all of the forested land area is covered with heavy forests. Of the agricultural land, 30.2% is used for growing crops and 47.4% is pastures, while 1.7% is used for orchards or vine crops.

The municipality was part of the Oron District until it was dissolved on 31 August 2006, and Bussigny-sur-Oron became part of the new district of Lavaux-Oron.

The small municipality is located near the Lausanne-Bulle road along the Mionnaz river.

The municipalities of Bussigny-sur-Oron, Châtillens, Chesalles-sur-Oron, Ecoteaux, Oron-la-Ville, Oron-le-Châtel, Palézieux, Les Tavernes, Les Thioleyres and Vuibroye are seeking approval from the Canton to merge on 1 January 2012 into the new municipality of Oron.

== Coat of arms ==
The blazon of the municipal coat of arms is Per pale, 1. Azure, two mullets of five above a crescent upward Or; 2. Or, a kid rampant Sable, langued Gules, horned and lined Argent.

== Demographics ==
Bussigny-sur-Oron has a population (as of 2010) of 77. As of 2008, 6.8% of the population are resident foreign nationals. Over the last 10 years (1999–2009 ) the population has changed at a rate of 25.4%. It has changed at a rate of 20.6% due to migration and at a rate of 1.6% due to births and deaths.

Most of the population (as of 2000) speaks French (60 or 89.6%), with German being second most common (5 or 7.5%) and English being third (1 or 1.5%).

The age distribution, as of 2009, in Bussigny-sur-Oron is; 7 children or 8.9% of the population are between 0 and 9 years old and 11 teenagers or 13.9% are between 10 and 19. Of the adult population, 13 people or 16.5% of the population are between 20 and 29 years old. 10 people or 12.7% are between 30 and 39, 14 people or 17.7% are between 40 and 49, and 7 people or 8.9% are between 50 and 59. The senior population distribution is 9 people or 11.4% of the population are between 60 and 69 years old, 6 people or 7.6% are between 70 and 79, there are 2 people or 2.5% who are between 80 and 89.

As of 2000, there were 27 people who were single and never married in the municipality. There were 33 married individuals, 4 widows or widowers and 3 individuals who are divorced.

As of 2000 the average number of residents per living room was 0.54 which is fewer people per room than the cantonal average of 0.61 per room. In this case, a room is defined as space of a housing unit of at least 4 m² (43 sq ft) as normal bedrooms, dining rooms, living rooms, kitchens and habitable cellars and attics. About 75% of the total households were owner occupied, or in other words did not pay rent (though they may have a mortgage or a rent-to-own agreement).

As of 2000, there were 24 private households in the municipality, and an average of 2.7 persons per household. There were 7 households that consist of only one person and 4 households with five or more people. Out of a total of 25 households that answered this question, 28.0% were households made up of just one person and there was 1 adult who lived with their parents. Of the rest of the households, there are 4 married couples without children, 10 married couples with children and 2 single parents with a child or children.

In 2000 there were 12 single family homes (or 60.0% of the total) out of a total of 20 inhabited buildings. There were multi-family buildings (0.0%), along with 7 multi-purpose buildings that were mostly used for housing (35.0%) and 1 other use buildings (commercial or industrial) that also had some housing (5.0%).

In 2000, a total of 24 apartments (96.0% of the total) were permanently occupied and one apartment was empty. As of 2009, the construction rate of new housing units was 0 new units per 1000 residents. The vacancy rate for the municipality, in 2010, was 0%.

The historical population is given in the following chart:

== Politics ==
In the 2007 federal election the most popular party was the SVP which received 28.03% of the vote. The next three most popular parties were the Green Party (25.25%), the EDU Party (13.64%) and the SP (11.11%). In the federal election, a total of 22 votes were cast, and the voter turnout was 44.9%.

== Economy ==
As of 2010, Bussigny-sur-Oron had an unemployment rate of 3.9%. As of 2008, there were 10 people employed in the primary economic sector and about 3 businesses involved in this sector. No one was employed in the secondary sector or the tertiary sector. There were 40 residents of the municipality who were employed in some capacity, of which females made up 37.5% of the workforce.

In 2008 the total number of full-time equivalent jobs was 8, all of which were in agriculture.

In 2000, there were 11 workers who commuted into the municipality and 28 workers who commuted away. The municipality is a net exporter of workers, with about 2.5 workers leaving the municipality for every one entering. Of the working population, 25% used public transportation to get to work, and 42.5% used a private car.

== Religion ==
From the 2000 census, 19 or 28.4% were Roman Catholic, while 26 or 38.8% belonged to the Swiss Reformed Church. Of the rest of the population, there were 8 individuals (or about 11.94% of the population) who belonged to another Christian church. There was 1 individual who was Islamic. 17 (or about 25.37% of the population) belonged to no church, are agnostic or atheist.

== Education ==
In Bussigny-sur-Oron about 21 or (31.3%) of the population have completed non-mandatory upper secondary education, and 12 or (17.9%) have completed additional higher education (either University or a Fachhochschule). Of the 12 who completed tertiary schooling, 58.3% were Swiss men, 33.3% were Swiss women.

In the 2009/2010 school year there were a total of 9 students in the Bussigny-sur-Oron school district. In the Vaud cantonal school system, two years of non-obligatory pre-school are provided by the political districts. During the school year, the political district provided pre-school care for a total of 665 children of which 232 children (34.9%) received subsidized pre-school care. The canton's primary school program requires students to attend for four years. There were 5 students in the municipal primary school program. The obligatory lower secondary school program lasts for six years and there were 4 students in those schools.

As of 2000, there was one student in Bussigny-sur-Oron who came from another municipality, while 12 residents attended schools outside the municipality.
