= Essertes =

- Former municipality
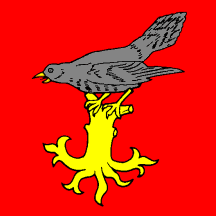
- Flag Coat of arms
- Location of Essertes
- Location within Switzerland Location within Canton of Vaud
- Coordinates: 46°34′N 06°47′E
- Country: Switzerland
- Canton: Vaud
- District: Lavaux-Oron

Government
  - Mayor: Syndic; Philippe Bardet

Area
  - Total: 1.66 km^{2} (0.64 sq mi)
- Elevation: 737 m (2,418 ft)

Population (2004)
  - Total: 261
  - Density: 157/km^{2} (407/sq mi)
- Demonym: Les Coucous
- Time zone: UTC+01:00 (CET)
  - Summer (DST): UTC+02:00 (CEST)
- Postal code: 1078
- SFOS number: 5788
- ISO 3166 code: CH-VD
- Surrounded by: Auboranges (FR), Vuibroye, Châtillens, Forel (Lavaux), Servion
- Website: www.essertes.ch

Essertes (French pronunciation: [esɛʁt]) is a former municipality in the district of Lavaux-Oron in the canton of Vaud in Switzerland. On 1 January 2022 the former municipality of Essertes merged into Oron.

== History ==
Essertes is first mentioned in 1154 as terram de Sartis. In 1271 it was mentioned as de Essertes.

== Geography ==
Essertes has an area, as of 2009, of 1.7 square kilometers (0.66 mi^{2}). Of this area, 1.23 km^{2} (0.47 mi^{2}) or 74.5% is used for agricultural purposes, while 0.28 km^{2} (0.11 mi^{2}) or 17.0% is forested. Of the rest of the land, 0.15 km^{2} (37 acres) or 9.1% is settled (buildings or roads).

Of the built up area, housing and buildings made up 4.8% and transportation infrastructure made up 4.2%. Out of the forested land, 10.9% of the total land area is heavily forested and 6.1% is covered with orchards or small clusters of trees. Of the agricultural land, 58.2% is used for growing crops and 13.9% is pastures, while 2.4% is used for orchards or vine crops.

The municipality was part of the Oron District until it was dissolved on 31 August 2006, and Essertes became part of the new district of Lavaux-Oron.

The municipality is located in the Jorat region, on the border with the Canton of Fribourg. It consists of the linear village of Essertes (on the Vevey-Moudon road) and the hamlets of Bretonnaire and Les Clos.

== Coat of arms ==
The blazon of the municipal coat of arms is Gules, on a Stump eradicated Or a Cuckoo proper.

== Demographics ==
Essertes has a population (as of December 2020) of 390. As of 2008, 15.6% of the population are resident foreign nationals. Over the last 10 years (1999–2009 ) the population has changed at a rate of 10.1%. It has changed at a rate of 2.4% due to migration and at a rate of 7.3% due to births and deaths.

Most of the population (as of 2000) speaks French (240 or 92.7%), with German being second most common (8 or 3.1%) and Italian being third (4 or 1.5%).

The age distribution, as of 2009, in Essertes is; 30 children or 11.0% of the population are between 0 and 9 years old and 32 teenagers or 11.7% are between 10 and 19. Of the adult population, 35 people or 12.8% of the population are between 20 and 29 years old. 31 people or 11.4% are between 30 and 39, 57 people or 20.9% are between 40 and 49, and 36 people or 13.2% are between 50 and 59. The senior population distribution is 32 people or 11.7% of the population are between 60 and 69 years old, 12 people or 4.4% are between 70 and 79, there are 7 people or 2.6% who are between 80 and 89, and there is 1 person who is 90 and older.

As of 2000, there were 106 people who were single and never married in the municipality. There were 133 married individuals, 11 widows or widowers and 9 individuals who are divorced.

As of 2000, there were 103 private households in the municipality, and an average of 2.5 persons per household. There were 33 households that consist of only one person and 12 households with five or more people. Out of a total of 104 households that answered this question, 31.7% were households made up of just one person and there was 1 adult who lived with their parents. Of the rest of the households, there are 25 married couples without children, 38 married couples with children There were 2 single parents with a child or children. There were 4 households that were made up of unrelated people and 1 household that was made up of some sort of institution or another collective housing.

In 2000 there were 39 single family homes (or 51.3% of the total) out of a total of 76 inhabited buildings. There were 13 multi-family buildings (17.1%), along with 21 multi-purpose buildings that were mostly used for housing (27.6%) and 3 other use buildings (commercial or industrial) that also had some housing (3.9%).

In 2000, a total of 103 apartments (92.0% of the total) were permanently occupied, while 2 apartments (1.8%) were seasonally occupied and 7 apartments (6.3%) were empty. As of 2009, the construction rate of new housing units was 0 new units per 1000 residents. The vacancy rate for the municipality, in 2010, was 0%.

The historical population is given in the following chart:

== Politics ==
In the 2007 federal election the most popular party was the SVP which received 26.3% of the vote. The next three most popular parties were the FDP (20.16%), the SP (16.47%) and the Green Party (15.53%). In the federal election, a total of 80 votes were cast, and the voter turnout was 46.0%.

== Economy ==
As of 2010, Essertes had an unemployment rate of 2.2%. As of 2008, there were 21 people employed in the primary economic sector and about 8 businesses involved in this sector. 11 people were employed in the secondary sector and there were 3 businesses in this sector. 9 people were employed in the tertiary sector, with 2 businesses in this sector. There were 158 residents of the municipality who were employed in some capacity, of which females made up 43.7% of the workforce.

In 2008 the total number of full-time equivalent jobs was 32. The number of jobs in the primary sector was 15, all of which were in agriculture. The number of jobs in the secondary sector was 10 of which 3 or (30.0%) were in manufacturing and 7 (70.0%) were in construction. The number of jobs in the tertiary sector was 7. In the tertiary sector; 4 or 57.1% were in a hotel or restaurant, 3 or 42.9% were in education.

In 2000, there were 37 workers who commuted into the municipality and 122 workers who commuted away. The municipality is a net exporter of workers, with about 3.3 workers leaving the municipality for every one entering. Of the working population, 8.9% used public transportation to get to work, and 70.3% used a private car.

== Religion ==
From the 2000 census, 64 or 24.7% were Roman Catholic, while 146 or 56.4% belonged to the Swiss Reformed Church. Of the rest of the population, there were 3 members of an Orthodox church (or about 1.16% of the population), and there were 20 individuals (or about 7.72% of the population) who belonged to another Christian church. There were 3 (or about 1.16% of the population) who were Islamic. 30 (or about 11.58% of the population) belonged to no church, are agnostic or atheist, and 3 individuals (or about 1.16% of the population) did not answer the question.

== Education ==
In Essertes about 106 or (40.9%) of the population have completed non-mandatory upper secondary education, and 46 or (17.8%) have completed additional higher education (either university or a Fachhochschule). Of the 46 who completed tertiary schooling, 60.9% were Swiss men, 19.6% were Swiss women and 10.9% were non-Swiss women.

In the 2009/2010 school year there were a total of 34 students in the Essertes school district. In the Vaud cantonal school system, two years of non-obligatory pre-school are provided by the political districts. During the school year, the political district provided pre-school care for a total of 665 children of which 232 children (34.9%) received subsidized pre-school care. The canton's primary school program requires students to attend for four years. There were 16 students in the municipal primary school program. The obligatory lower secondary school program lasts for six years and there were 18 students in those schools.

As of 2000, there were 21 students in Essertes who came from another municipality, while 26 residents attended schools outside the municipality.
