= Oron Castle =

Castle in Oron, Switzerland

- Château d'Oron
- Oron in Switzerland
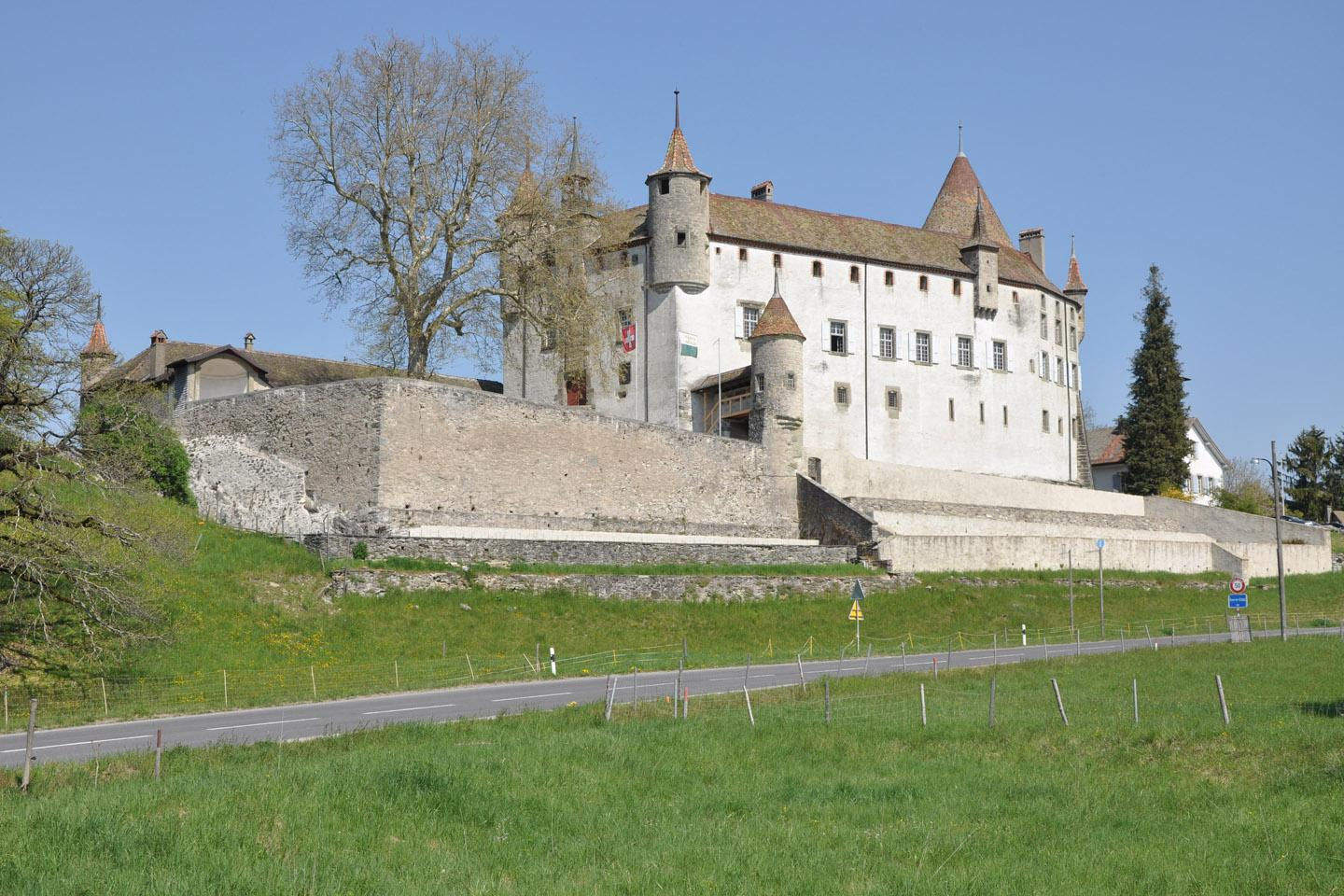
- Oron Castle

Site information
- Type: Castle

Location
- Coordinates: 46°34′28″N 6°50′14″E

Site history
- Built: 13th century

Swiss Cultural Property of National Significance

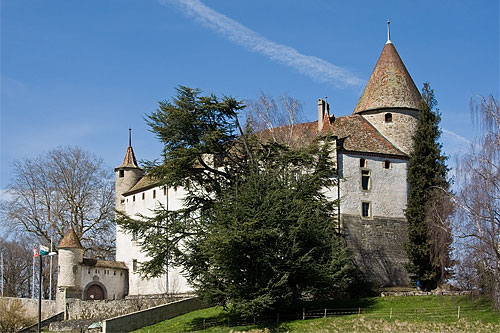
Oron Castle

Oron Castle is a castle in the municipality of Oron in the canton of Vaud in Switzerland. It is a Swiss heritage site of national significance.

== History ==
The castle was built in the 13th century. It was totally rebuilt in second half of the 15th century and renovated several times in the 17th century. In 1801 it was acquired the Roberti family of Moudon, and in 1870 it was bought by Adolphe Gaiffe. Beginning in 1880, a library was built in the castle. Today it houses 17,000 volumes and is one of the largest private collections of French novelists of the 18th century in Europe. The castle was bought in 1936 by the Association pour la Conservation du château d'Oron, which was founded to preserve the castle two years earlier.

== See also ==
- List of castles in Switzerland
- Château
- House of Oron
