= Lavaux-Oron District =

Lavaux-Oron District District de Lavaux-Oron
- District
- Coordinates: 46°29′17″N 6°43′41″E
- Country: Switzerland
- Canton: Vaud
- Capital: Bourg-en-Lavaux

Government
  - Type: Prefecture
  - Prefect: Daniel Flotron

Area
  - Total: 134.54 km^{2} (51.95 sq mi)

Population (2020)
  - Total: 63,446
  - Density: 471.58/km^{2} (1,221.4/sq mi)
- Time zone: UTC+1 (CET)
  - Summer (DST): UTC+2 (CEST)
- Municipalities: 16

Lavaux-Oron District (French: District de Lavaux-Oron) is a district in the Swiss canton of Vaud.

== Geography ==
Lavaux-Oron has an area, as of 2009, of 134.54 square kilometers (51.95 sq mi). Of this area, 79.92 km^{2} (30.86 sq mi) or 59.4% is used for agricultural purposes, while 31.55 km^{2} (12.18 sq mi) or 23.5% is forested. Of the rest of the land, 21.94 km^{2} (8.47 sq mi) or 16.3% is settled (buildings or roads) and 1.19 km^{2} (0.46 sq mi) or 0.9% is unproductive land.

== Demographics ==
Lavaux-Oron has a population (as of December 2020) of 63,446.

In 2008 there were 419 live births to Swiss citizens and 127 births to non-Swiss citizens, and in same time span there were 463 deaths of Swiss citizens and 38 non-Swiss citizen deaths. Ignoring immigration and emigration, the population of Swiss citizens decreased by 44 while the foreign population increased by 89. There were 16 Swiss men and 6 Swiss women who emigrated from Switzerland. At the same time, there were 391 non-Swiss men and 430 non-Swiss women who immigrated from another country to Switzerland. The total Swiss population change in 2008 (from all sources, including moves across municipal borders) was an increase of 57 and the non-Swiss population increased by 881 people. This represents a population growth rate of 1.7%.

The age distribution, as of 2009, in Lavaux-Oron is; 5,811 children or 10.5% of the population are between 0 and 9 years old and 6,539 teenagers or 11.8% are between 10 and 19. Of the adult population, 5,460 people or 9.8% of the population are between 20 and 29 years old. 7,400 people or 13.3% are between 30 and 39, 9,122 people or 16.4% are between 40 and 49, and 7,428 people or 13.4% are between 50 and 59. The senior population distribution is 6,693 people or 12.0% of the population are between 60 and 69 years old, 4,137 people or 7.4% are between 70 and 79, there are 2,451 people or 4.4% who are 80 and 89, and there are 525 people or 0.9% who are 90 and older.

== Mergers and name changes ==
- On 1 September 2006, the Lausanne district (District de Lausanne), Lavaux district (District de Lavaux) and Oron district (District d'Oron) were dissolved and parts of the old districts were merged into the new Lavaux-Oron district.
  - The municipalities of Belmont-sur-Lausanne, Paudex and Pully came from the Lausanne district (District de Lausanne).
  - The municipalities of Chexbres, Cully, Epesses, Forel (Lavaux), Grandvaux, Lutry, Puidoux, Riex, Rivaz, Saint-Saphorin (Lavaux), Savigny and Villette (Lavaux) came from the Lavaux district (District de Lavaux)
  - The municipalities of Bussigny-sur-Oron, Châtillens, Chesalles-sur-Oron, Les Cullayes, Ecoteaux, Essertes, Ferlens (VD), Maracon, Mézières (VD), Montpreveyres, Oron-la-Ville, Oron-le-Châtel, Palézieux, Servion, Les Tavernes, Les Thioleyres and Vuibroye came from the Oron district (District d'Oron).
- On 1 July 2011 the municipalities of Cully, Epesses, Grandvaux, Riex and Villette (Lavaux) merged into the new municipality of Bourg-en-Lavaux.
- On 1 January 2012 when the former municipalities of Bussigny-sur-Oron, Châtillens, Chesalles-sur-Oron, Ecoteaux, Oron-la-Ville, Oron-le-Châtel, Palézieux, Les Tavernes, Les Thioleyres and Vuibroye merged to form Oron. At the same time, Les Cullayes merged into the municipality of Servion.
- On 1 July 2016 when the former municipalities of Carrouge, Ferlens and Mézières merged into the new municipality of Jorat-Mézières.
- On 1 January 2022 the former municipality of Essertes merged into the municipality of Oron.

== Politics ==
In the 2007 federal election the most popular party was the SVP which received 19.93% of the vote. The next three most popular parties were the SP (18.96%), the FDP (16.39%) and the Green Party (15.26%). In the federal election, a total of 16,784 votes were cast, and the voter turnout was 50.6%.

== Education ==
In the 2009/2010 school year there were a total of 5,846 students in the local and district school systems. In the Vaud cantonal school system, two years of non-obligatory pre-school are provided by the political districts. During the school year, the district provided pre-school care for a total of 665 children. There were 232 (34.9%) children who received subsidized pre-school care. There were 3,044 students in the primary school program, which last four years. The obligatory lower secondary school program lasts for six years and there were 2,769 students in those schools. There were also 33 students who were home schooled or attended another non-traditional school.

== Communes ==
It consists of the following communes:

Municipality	Population (31 December 2020)	Area km^{2}
Belmont-sur-Lausanne	3,750	2.65
Bourg-en-Lavaux	526	11.6
Chexbres	2,252	2.14
Forel (Lavaux)	2,107	18.51
Jorat-Mézières	2,968	11.09
Lutry	10,459	8.45
Maracon	537	4.38
Montpreveyres	653	4.10
Oron	5,664	24.62
Paudex	1,540	0.48
Puidoux	2,888	22.89
Pully	18,694	5.85
Rivaz	337	0.31
Saint-Saphorin (Lavaux)	389	0.89
Savigny	3,349	16.02
Servion	2,078	6.32
Total	63,446	134.57
