= Bussac, Dordogne =

Bussac
- Commune
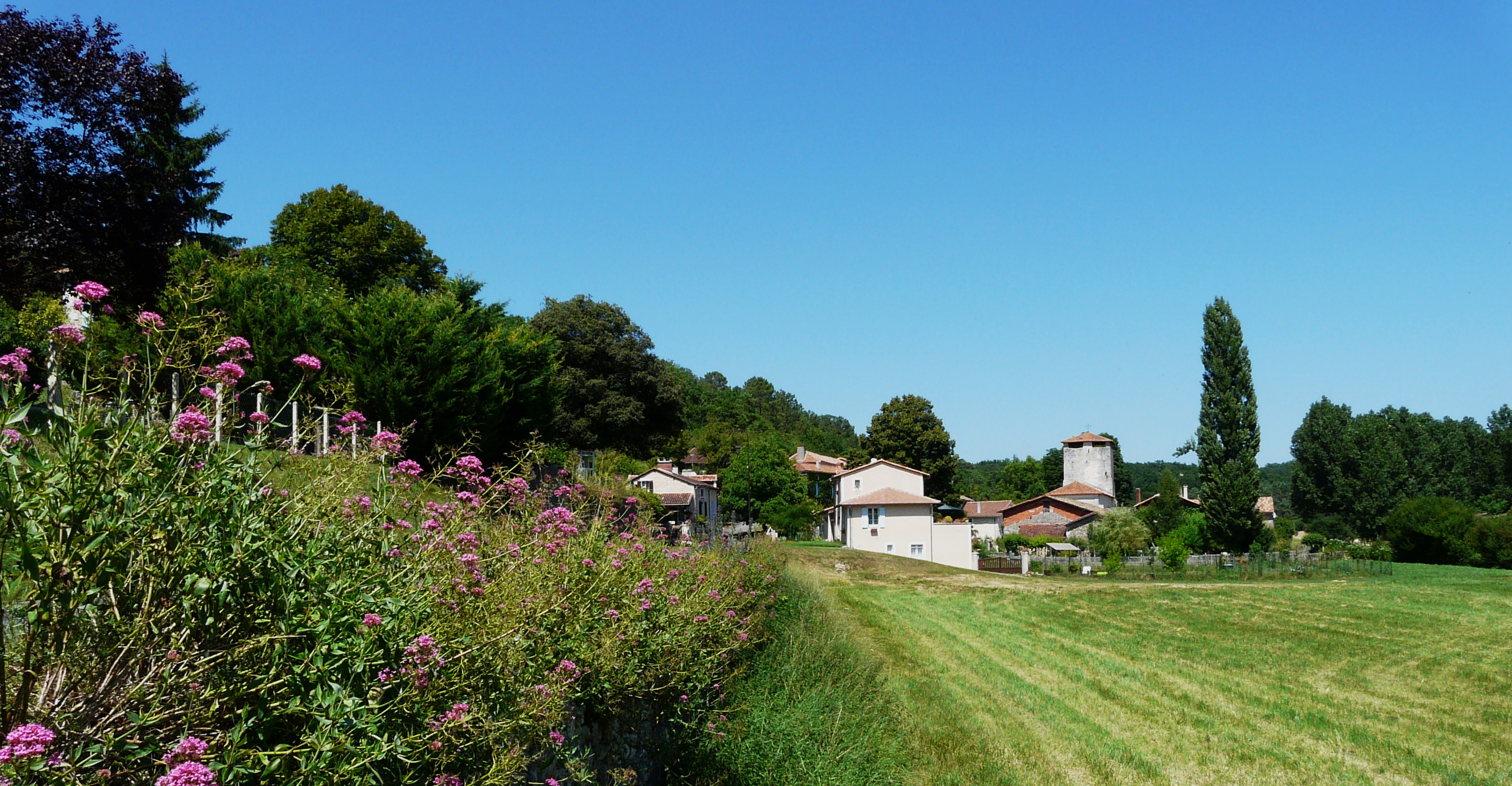
- A general view of Bussac
- Location of Bussac
- Location within France Location within Nouvelle-Aquitaine
- Coordinates: 45°16′24″N 0°36′26″E
- Country: France
- Region: Nouvelle-Aquitaine
- Department: Dordogne
- Arrondissement: Nontron
- Canton: Brantôme en Périgord
- Intercommunality: Dronne et Belle

Government
  - Mayor (2020–2026): Bernard Merle
- Area^{1}: 16.84 km^{2} (6.50 sq mi)
- Elevation: 167 m (548 ft)
- Highest elevation: 218 m (715 ft)
- Lowest elevation: 101 m (331 ft)
- Population (2023): 379
  - Density: 22.5/km^{2} (58.3/sq mi)
- Time zone: UTC+01:00 (CET)
  - Summer (DST): UTC+02:00 (CEST)
- INSEE/Postal code: 24069 /24350
- ^{1} French Land Register data, which excludes lakes, ponds, glaciers > 1 km^{2} (0.386 sq mi or 247 acres) and river estuaries.

Bussac (French pronunciation: [bysak]) is a commune in the Dordogne department in southwestern France.

== Population ==
Historical population
Year	Pop.	±% p.a.
1968	210	—
1975	197	−0.91%
1982	200	+0.22%
1990	267	+3.68%
1999	322	+2.10%
2007	358	+1.33%
2012	366	+0.44%
2017	397	+1.64%
2023	379	−0.77%
Source: INSEE

== See also ==
- Communes of the Dordogne department
