= Broye =

River in Switzerland

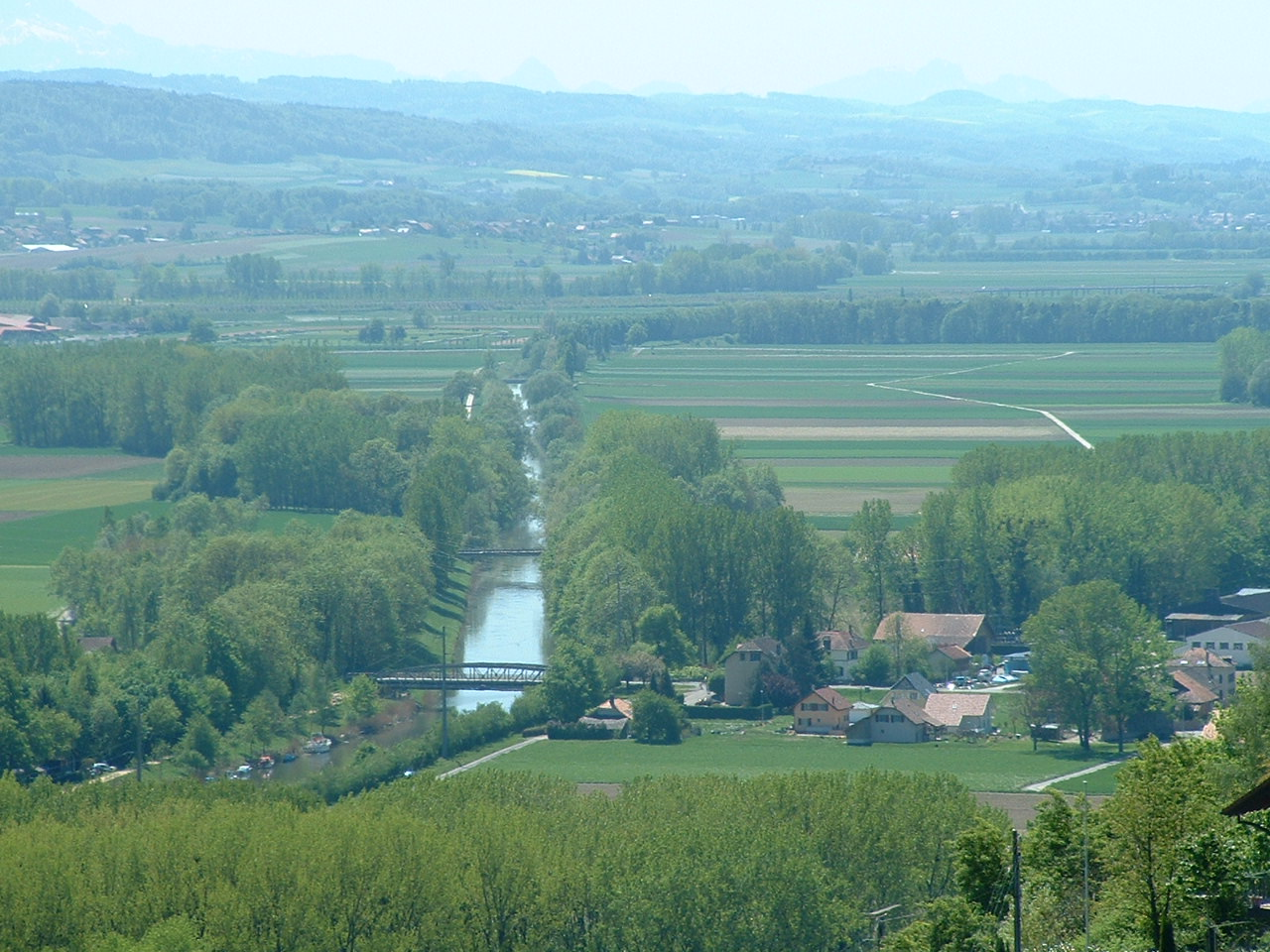
- The Broye in Salavaux.

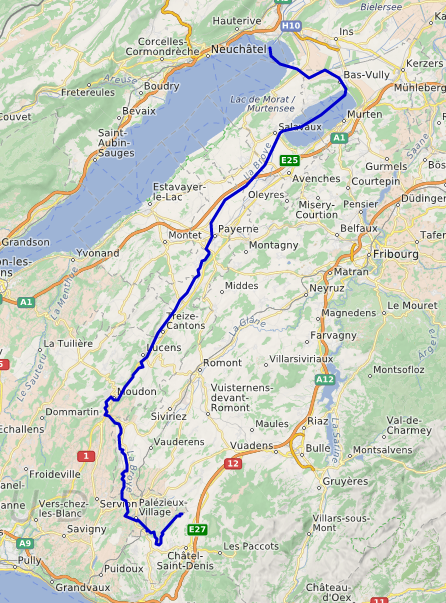
- Native name: La Broye (French)

Location
- Country: Switzerland

Physical characteristics
- Source
  - location: Semsales (FR)
- Mouth: Lake Neuchâtel
  - coordinates: 46.9803°N 7.0365°E
- Length: 68 km (42 mi)
- Basin size: 850 km^{2} (330 sq mi)

Basin features
- Progression: Lake Neuchâtel→ Thielle→ Lake Biel→ Aare→ Rhine→ North Sea

The Broye (French: [bʁwa]; Arpitan: Brouye [bʁuj(ə)]) is a 68 km long river, in the cantons of Fribourg and Vaud, in Switzerland. It has a watershed area of 850 km^{2}.

== Presentation ==
Its source is located in Semsales, in the Fribourgeois/Vaudois Prealps, south-west of Bulle. It flows first south-west along the Fribourgeois/Vaudois Prealps and turns north after 10 km. The direction of the river changes again near Moudon to the north-east. From Payerne, the Broye is running in a large and agricultural valley. The river flows into Lake Morat first, and then into Lake Neuchâtel through the Broye canal (French: Canal de la Broye).

=== List of Tributaries ===
- The Petite Glâne
- The Bressonne
- The Lembe
- The Arbogne

=== Course ===
- Semsales
- Oron
- Moudon
- Lucens
- Payerne
- Salavaux
- Lake Morat
- Sugiez
- La Sauge
- Lake Neuchatel

== See also ==
- Swiss Plateau
- Jura water correction
