= Ada Marra =

Swiss politician

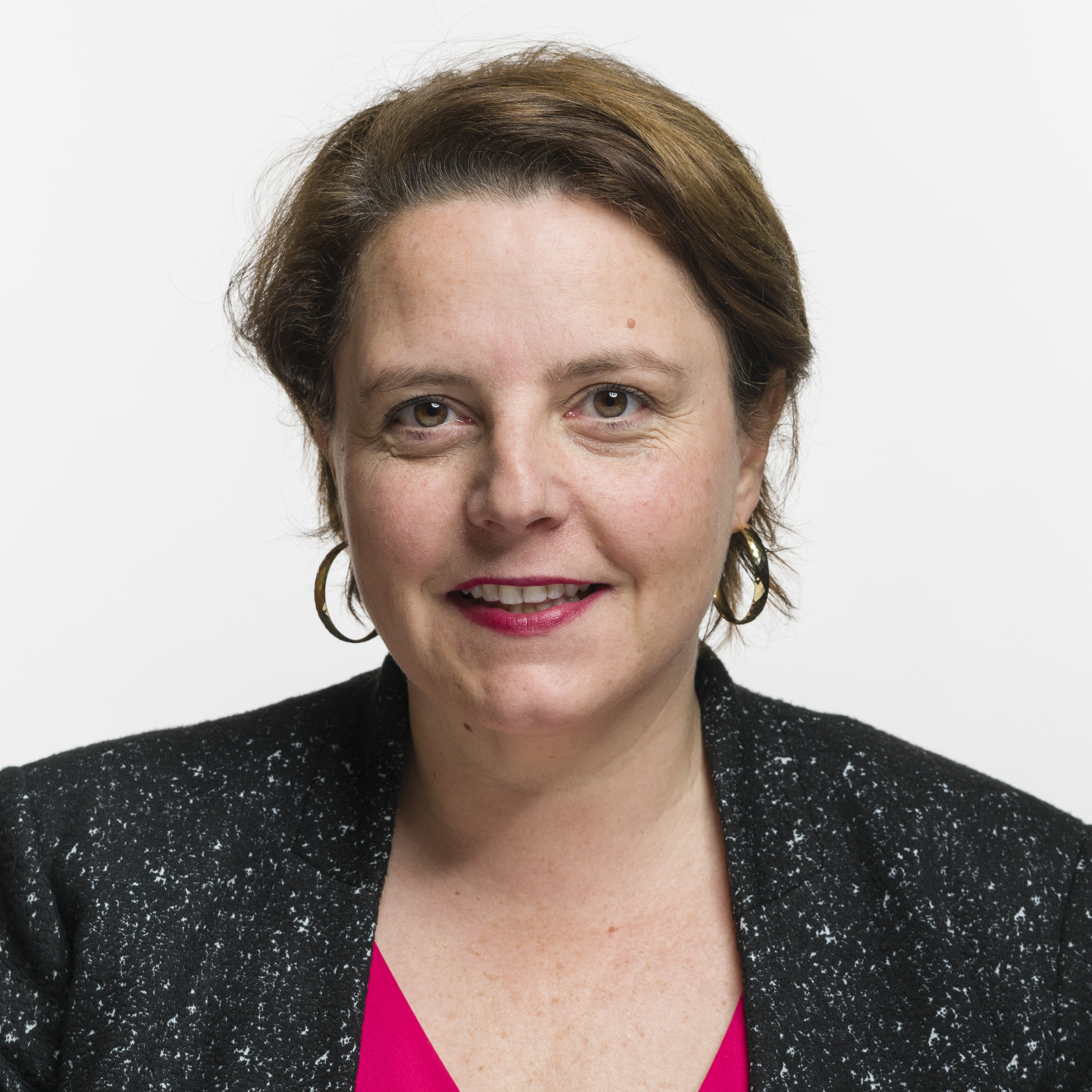
Ada Marra in 2019

Ada Marra (born Addolorata Marra, March 10, 1973, Paudex, Switzerland) is a Swiss political figure and a member of the Swiss Socialist Party.

== Early life and education ==
Marra was born in Paudex of Italian parents from Apulia who migrated to Switzerland in the 1960s. She grew up in Paudex and attended a school in Lausanne, then studied at the University of Lausanne, where she obtained a bachelor's degree in political science in 1996. In the same year, she obtained Swiss citizenship while retaining the Italian nationality of her parents.

== Political career ==
Marra joined the Swiss Socialist Party in 1997, where she was General Secretary for seven years.

In December 2004, Marra was elected a member of the Grand Council of the Canton of Vaud and three years later, in December 2007, she was elected National Councilor for the Canton of Vaud. She was a member of the Committee of the National Council for Political Institutions and she is member of the Committee for Economics and Taxation

In 2008, Marra introduced a parliamentary initiative asking for a facilitated naturalization for foreigners of the 3rd generation (foreigners born in Switzerland whose parents are born in Switzerland but their grandparents came to Switzerland as migrants) which led to the adoption by the Federal Assembly in 2016 of a decree amending the constitution and submitted to referendum on February 12, 2017. Ada Marra reached an unprecedented victory, thus beating the right-wing oriented UDC with regards to the national identity (UDC's favorite ground).

In addition to her role in parliament, Marra has been serving as a member of the Swiss delegation to the Parliamentary Assembly of the Council of Europe since 2020. As a member of the Socialist Party, she is part of the Socialists, Democrats and Greens Group. In the Assembly, she serves on the Committee on Migration, Refugees and Displaced Persons (since 2022), the Committee on Equality and Non-Discrimination (since 2020), the Sub-Committee on Migrant Smuggling and Trafficking in Human Beings (since 2022) and the Sub-Committee on Gender Equality (since 2020). She is also the Assembly's rapporteur on undocumented persons.

== Volunteering ==
Marra is involved in several charity associations linked with the struggle against precariousness. She is a member of the Presidium of Caritas Switzerland in connection with the Roman Catholic Church and President of the Mother Sofia Foundation (which was originally linked to the Serbian Orthodox Church but no longer has religious affiliations Today) since June 1, 2011.

== Publications ==
Tu parles bien français pour une italienne. Illustration Denis Kormann. Georg. Geneva 2017
