= Lutry =

- Municipality
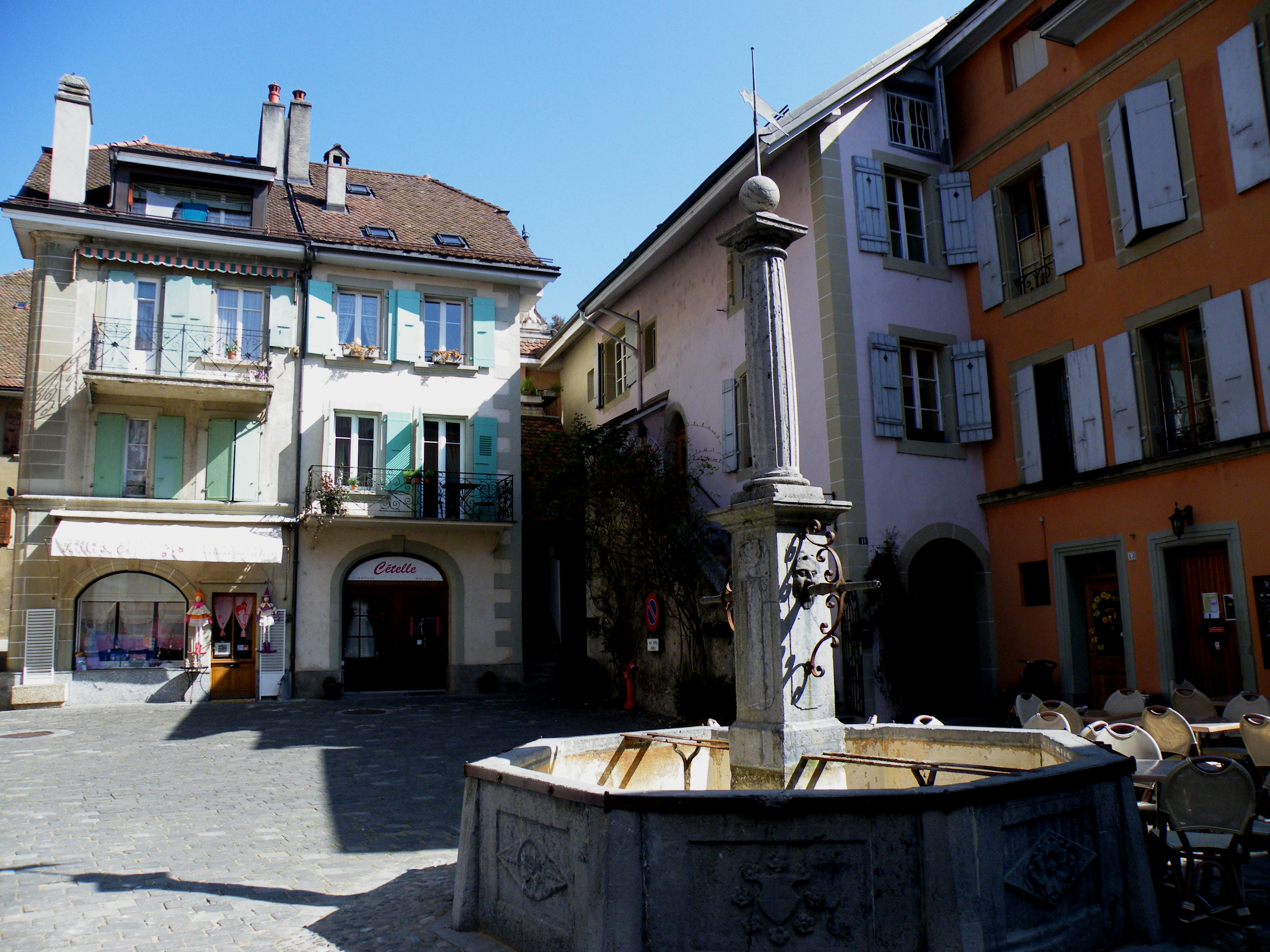
- Lutry village

- Flag Coat of arms
- Location of Lutry
- Location within Switzerland Location within Canton of Vaud
- Coordinates: 46°30′N 6°41′E
- Country: Switzerland
- Canton: Vaud
- District: Lavaux-Oron

Government
  - Mayor: Syndic; Charles Monod FDP/PRD/PLR (as of 2024)

Area
  - Total: 8.45 km^{2} (3.26 sq mi)
- Elevation: 373 m (1,224 ft)

Population (2000)
  - Total: 8,443
  - Density: 999/km^{2} (2,590/sq mi)
- Demonym: Les Lutryens/Nickname: "Les Singes" (English: Monkeys)
- Time zone: UTC+01:00 (CET)
  - Summer (DST): UTC+02:00 (CEST)
- Postal code: 1095
- SFOS number: 5606
- ISO 3166 code: CH-VD
- Localities: Savuit, Corsy
- Surrounded by: Savigny, Villette, Paudex, Belmont-sur-Lausanne
- Twin towns: Sigriswil (Switzerland)
- Website: www.lutry.ch

Lutry (French pronunciation: [lytʁi]) is a municipality in the Swiss canton of Vaud, located in the Lavaux-Oron, which includes the Lavaux region, a UNESCO World Heritage site.

== History ==
Lutry is first mentioned in 908 as in Lustraco villam. In 1124 it was mentioned as monasterium Sancti Martini cum villa quae dicitur Lustriacus and in 1147 it was Lustriey.

=== Prehistory ===
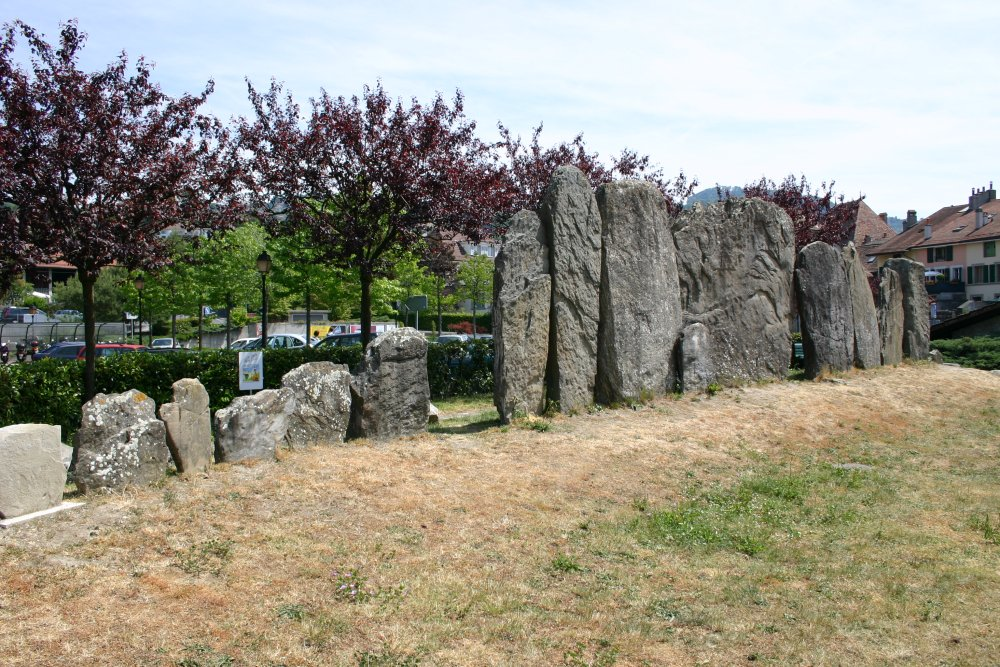
Menhirs in Lutry

In 1835 and again in 1894, Neolithic graves were discovered in Châtelard. The graves contained a total of some thirty stone box graves of the so-called Chamblandes type. They contained three ax blades of worked flint, as well as parts of a shell necklace. In 1895, several graves of the same type were discovered in Montagny. They contained important new items such as antler shafts made for axes, a polished stone ax and stone spindle whorls. While these types of items were often found in the remains of littoral Neolithic settlements, they are rarely found in graves, which made the discovery at Montagny especially significant. However, in 1927, archaeologists incorrectly assumed that these findings were assigned to the tombs in error. Without further evidence, they wrote that there was an undiscovered littoral settlement below Montagny.

In August 1984, during the construction of the underground car park in La Possession, an arrangement of 24 standing stones (menhir) were discovered. 18 of the stones were re-erected next to it in the original formation. The thirteen large standing stones (2–4 m (6.6–13.1 ft) high) were arranged in a line, while the eleven subsequent smaller stones (from 0.3 to 0.8 m (12 to 31 in) high) described a curve to the south. The standing stones are traditionally assigned to the beginning of the middle Neolithic period. However local pottery indicates a later date, to the late Neolithic or early Bronze Age. Menhir No. 14 is a figurative stele, in which geometric ornamentation (x-shaped lines, balanced circles, zigzag line) were carved. Similar symbols can also be found on standing stones in southern France, but their meaning is unknown.

At various places in the municipality, including Curtinaux, Le Châtelard, Savuit and Gantennaz, there are traces of Roman era settlements. These include bricks, walls, parts of buildings and ornaments and the remains of an aqueduct.

=== Medieval town ===
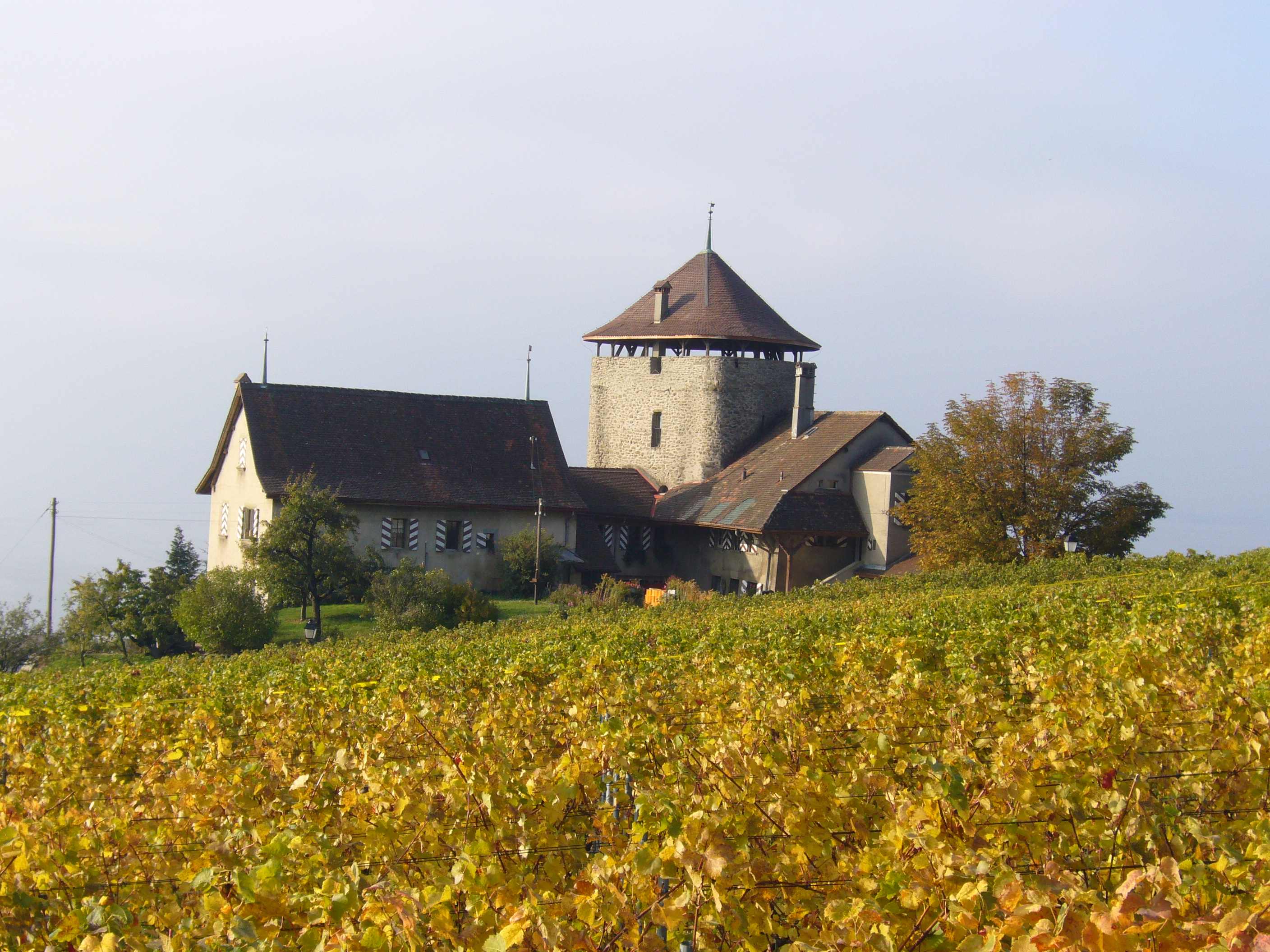
Bertholod tower and surrounding vineyards

Lutry was a royal estate of the Burgundian House of Welf. A fortified tower was built in the 11th century in Crêt-Bernard to help govern the estate. After the death of Rudolph III the estate passed to Conrad of Swabia and became an imperial estate. In 1079, Emperor Henry IV donated the estate to the Bishop of Lausanne. The Bishop held the estate until 1536. By 1263, the Abbey of Saint-Maurice possessed some land in Lutry, which they had received in 1017 from the Kings of Burgundy. Between 1025 and 1124, due to the donation of a man named Anselme, a Benedictine priory was founded on the alluvial delta of the Lutrive river. The priory was under the abbey of Savigny-en-Lyonnais (Rhône-Alpes). The priory was the recipient of numerous gifts and church records from the dioceses of Lausanne, Sion and Geneva. Initially it held about fifteen monks, but it quickly expanded and had authority over the villages of Lutry, Villette and Paudex until 1548. At the beginning of the 15th century, the priory freed its serfs. The town of Lutry, which was granted certain freedoms by the bishop, began to develop in the first quarter of the 12th century around the priory. In 1368 the soldiers of Lutry marched under the double banners of the priory and the diocese. Throughout the Middle Ages there were conflicts in the relationship between the mother abbey, the priory, the Bishop and towns.

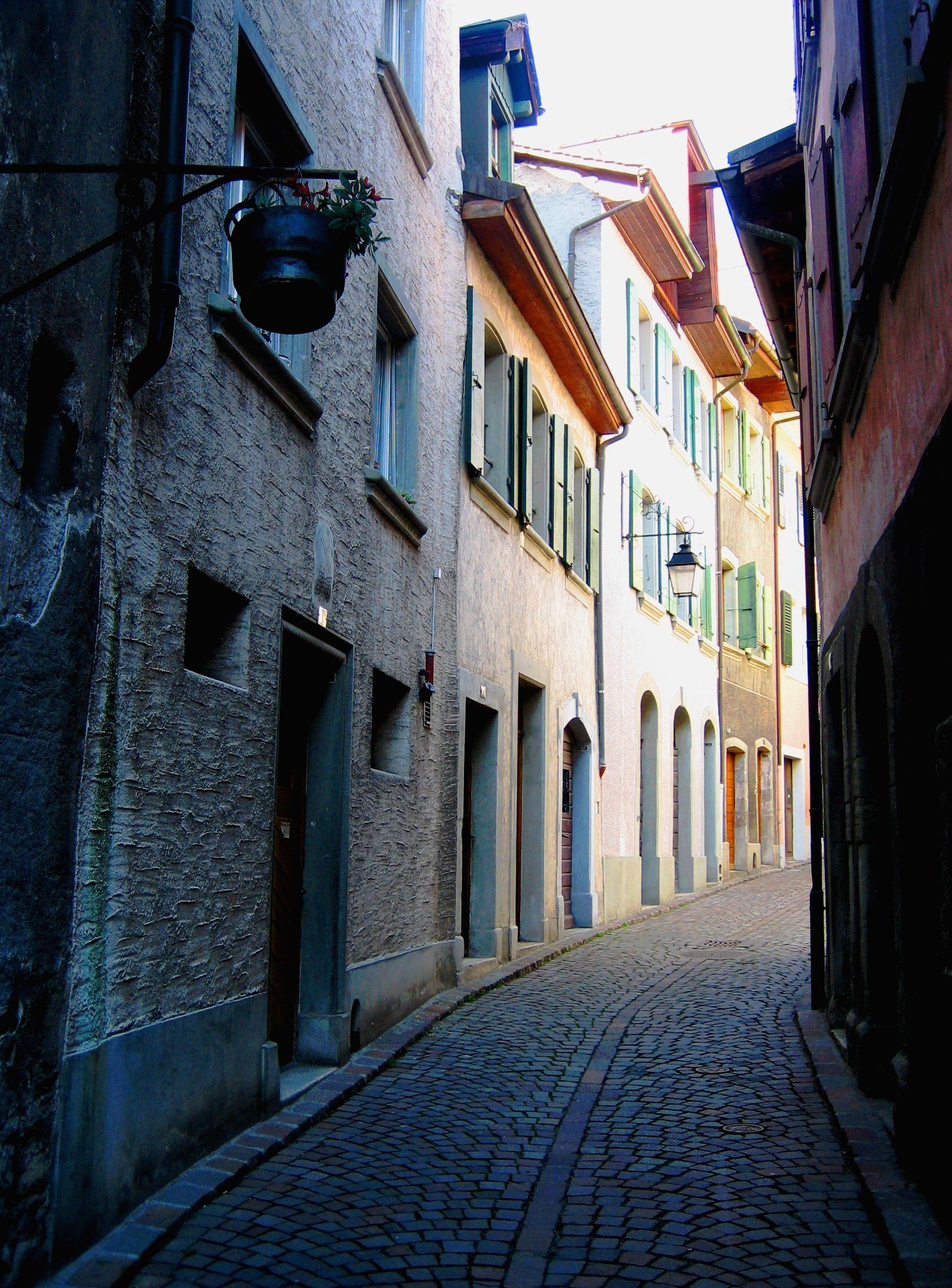
Lutry street

Lutry began to become a town at the beginning of the 13th century when it was encircled by a circular wall created by the Bishop (1212–19). The wall was supported by a square tower, the Tour de l'Eveque, which was built by William of Ecublens in 1221–29. The hamlets Curtinaux, Savuit, Le Châtelard and Corsy as well as the neighborhoods of Friporte, Voisinand and Bourg Neuf were outside the walls, and soon a second curtain wall was built around the latter. In 1291 there was a hospital in the priory and in 1348 another one was built in the town. With the construction of an inner harbor, market buildings were created in 1408. At the instigation of the monks, a vineyard was placed around the town. An organization known as the Brotherhood of the Holy Spirit, in 1307, marked the beginning of a civic organization. Starting in the 13th century, the town began an effort to deforest the neighboring Monts-de-Lutry, an effort that was completed in the 17th century. The newly available fields, pastures and forests were managed by farmers, who were also citizens of the town.

The parish of Lutry is first mentioned in 1228. The original parish also included Savigny (separated 1598), Belmont-sur-Lausanne (1766–1846) and Villette (1846–63). The Priory Church of Saint-Martin also served as the parish church. The church was built in 1250–60 over a building from the 11th century. It was rebuilt in 1344 following a fire. It was restored and extended in 1569–1591 and renovated from 1889 to 1907.

=== Early Modern Lutry ===
To manage Lutry, the priory appointed a governor and the Bishop appointed a Meier or ecclesiastical bailiff, both of which were based in the castle. The Meier's office was hereditary in the Mayor de Lutry noble family. The family retained their position even after the conquest of Vaud by the Bernese. The last of the family, Claude Mayor de Lutry died in 1598 and was replaced by a castellan. The castellan ruled over the town as well as the estates of Corsier until 1798.

In 1536 Lutry unsuccessfully opposed the Bernese conquest and the Reformation. The Priory was closed in 1537 and the episcopal properties were secularized. From 1536 until 1798 Lutry was part of the Bailiwick of Lausanne. During this period it was ruled by an eighteen-member council and a twelve-member council, which was led by a knight banneret. There were four judicial courts over the town and the surrounding villages; the courts of Letry and Savigny, the court of the castellan and the court of the Lords of Corsier.

=== Modern Lutry ===
Aerial view from 100 m by Walter Mittelholzer (1919)

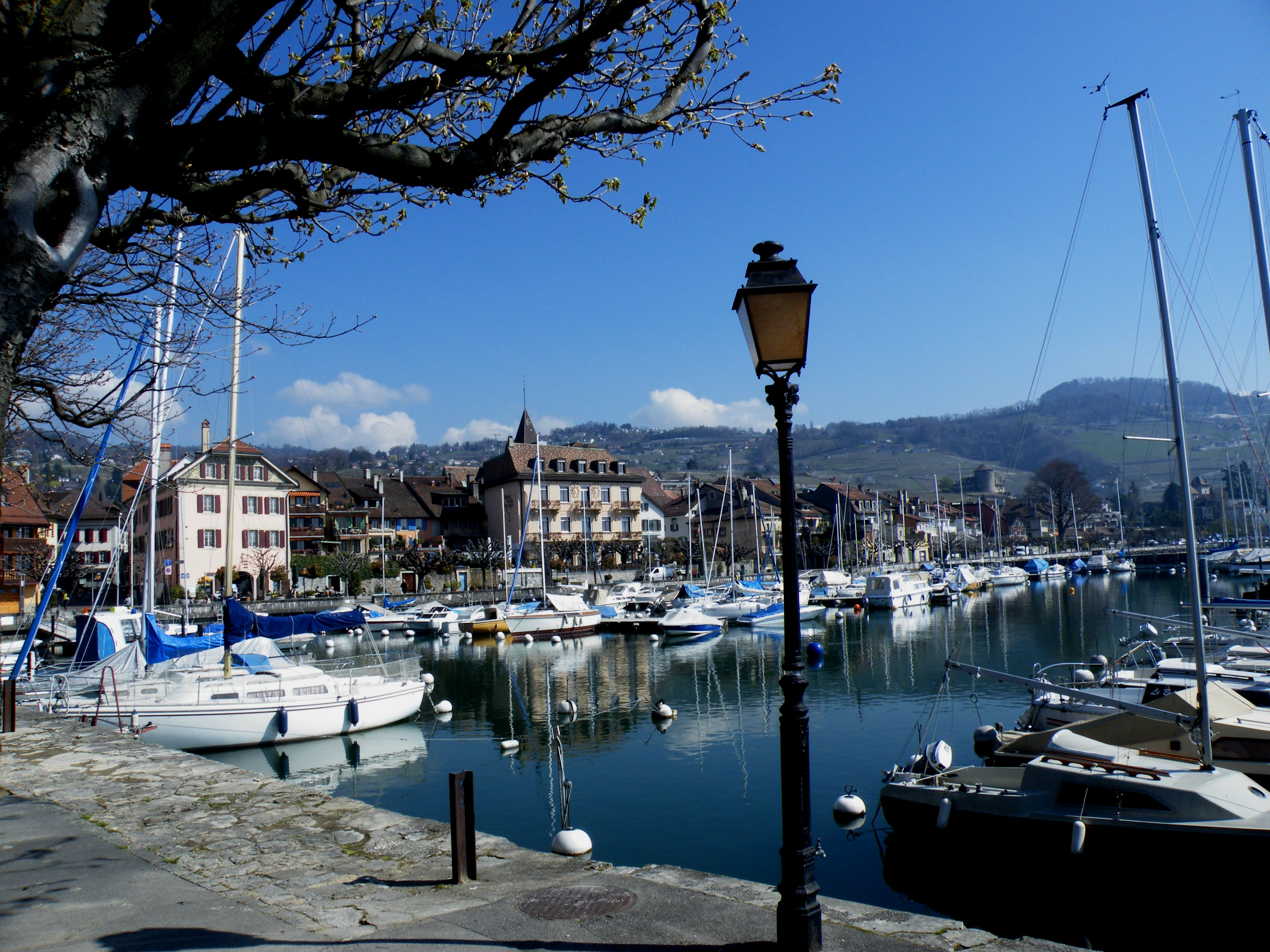
Lutry port

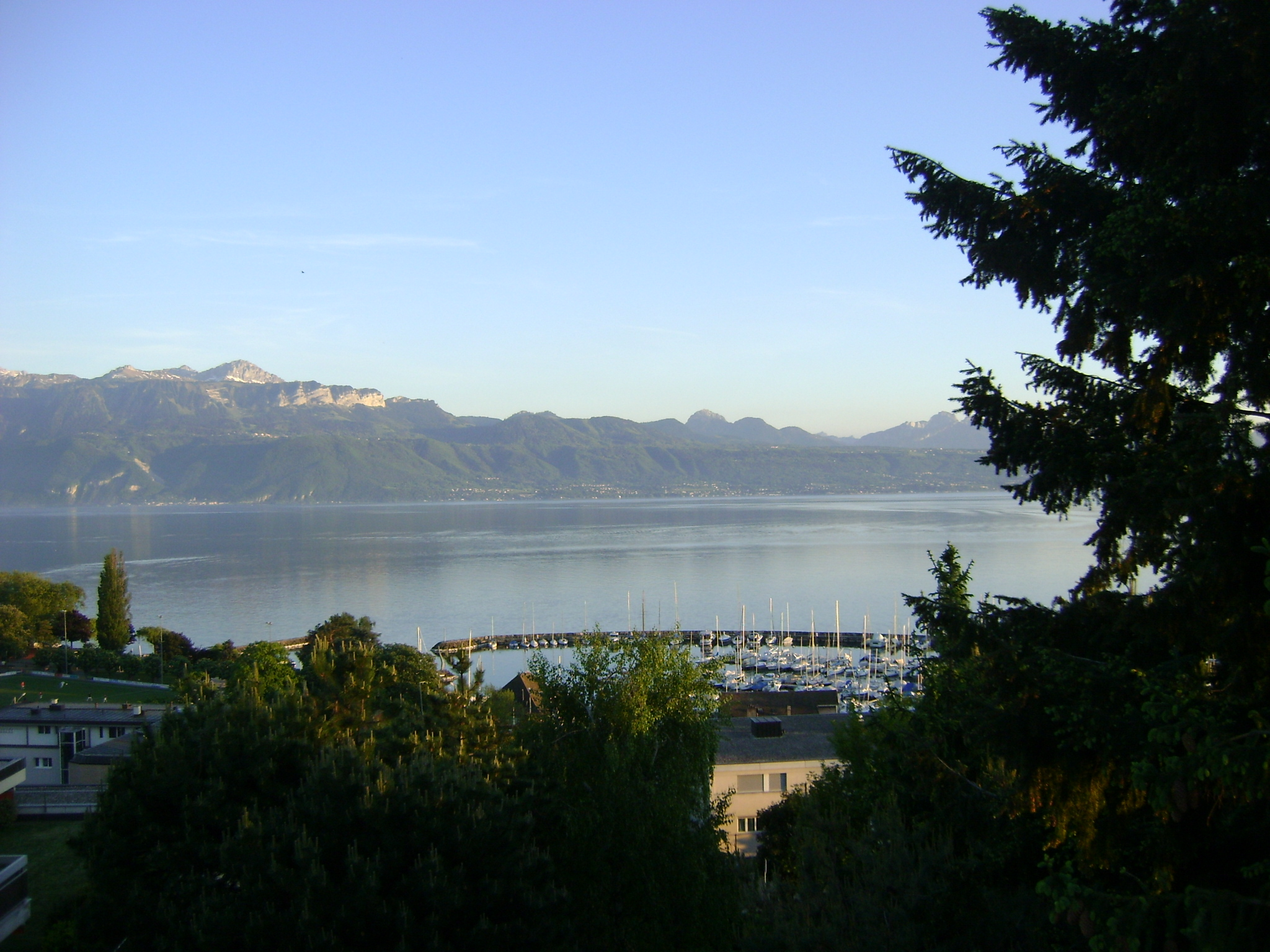
View on Lac Léman and the Alps from Lutry heights.

In 1798, Lutry joined, at the last minute, the Vaud revolution against Bern. Following the French invasion in 1798 and the creation of the Helvetic Republic, it was part of the district of Lavaux. Lutry was administered by an eleven-member council which was led by a Syndic. Between 1803–25 there were 15 municipal councils and officials, which after 1815 met in an upper council. Starting in 1826, Lutry and Savigny separated to form two independent municipalities.

In 1854, the owner of the castle of Lutry was given the town by its owner, Juste Charles Antoine de Crousaz.

The vineyards, which during the Ancien Régime were partly owned by Fribourg, Bern, Lausanne and Yverdon patricians and partly owned by the citizens of Lutry, became the most important source of income in 19th century and at the beginning of the 20th century. The construction of a harbor (1836–38), a quay (1863) and a dock (1816, 1912) opened the city to the lake. In 1822 the market building was changed into a school. In 1885, the former school building was demolished to make way for a customs house. The train station of Lutry on the Lausanne–Brig line opened in 1861. Followed in 1862 by the La Conversion station on the Bern rail line, followed in 1920 by the stop at Bossière. Starting in 1896, a tram line connected Lutry with Lausanne.

The period around the turn of the 20th century was characterized both by the influx of many new, non-local families and by phylloxera disease outbreaks in the vineyards. The latter triggered an unprecedented economic crisis. In the 1950s, the decline of viticulture and the parallel urbanization of Lutry encouraged a number of small and medium-sized enterprises. In 2000 there were approximately 400 businesses in the town. Starting in the 1960s Lutry grew into Lausanne agglomeration and became a popular residential area for the wealthy classes.

In 1998, a new port was built.

== Geography ==
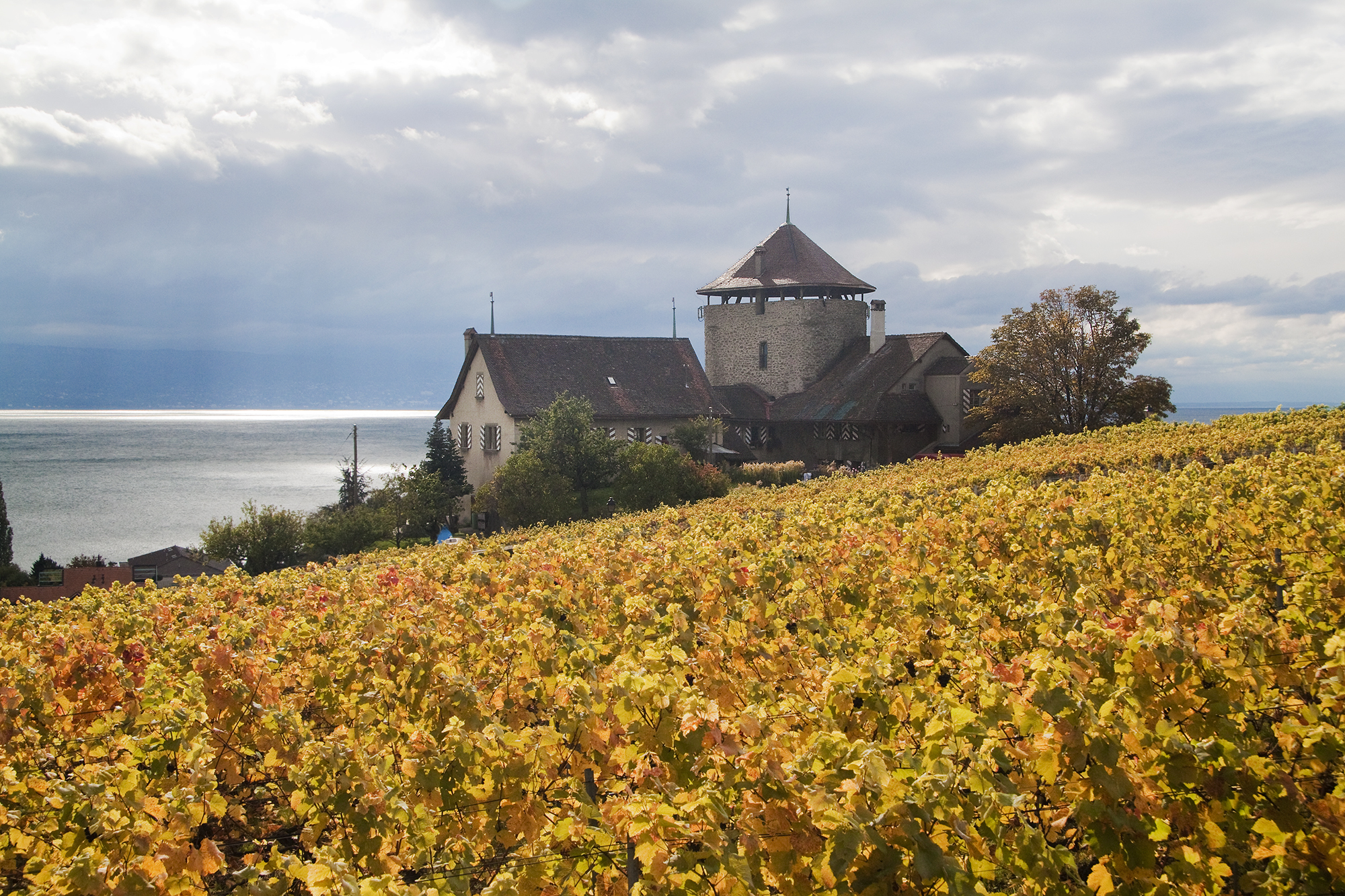
Vineyards and Bertholo tower outside Lutry

Lutry has an area, as of 2009, of 8.45 square kilometres (3.26 mi^{2}). Of this area, 3.67 km^{2} (1.42 mi^{2}) or 43.4% is used for agricultural purposes, while 1.69 km^{2} (0.65 mi^{2}) or 20.0% is forested. Of the rest of the land, 3.03 km^{2} (1.17 mi^{2}) or 35.9% is settled (buildings or roads), 0.05 km^{2} (12 acres) or 0.6% is either rivers or lakes and 0.01 km^{2} (2.5 acres) or 0.1% is unproductive land.

Of the built up area, housing and buildings made up 20.9% and transportation infrastructure made up 11.4%. while parks, green belts and sports fields made up 2.4%. Out of the forested land, 17.4% of the total land area is heavily forested and 2.6% is covered with orchards or small clusters of trees. Of the agricultural land, 12.1% is used for growing crops and 12.7% is pastures, while 18.7% is used for orchards or vine crops. All the water in the municipality is flowing water.

The municipality was part of the Lavaux District until it was dissolved on 31 August 2006, and Lutry became part of the new district of Lavaux-Oron.

The municipality is located on numerous terraces between Lake Geneva and the Jorat region. Until 1823 it included the now independent municipality of Savigny. It consists of the village of Lutry and the hamlets of Curtinaux, Savuit, Le Châtelard, Corsy, La Conversion, Echerins, Bossières, Le Daley, Montagny, Le Petit Bochat, Le Miroir and La Croix. It borders the municipalities of Paudex and Belmont-sur-Lausanne to the east, Savigny to the north and Villette to the west.

== Coat of arms ==
The blazon of the municipal coat of arms is Per fess Gules and Argent.

== Demographics ==
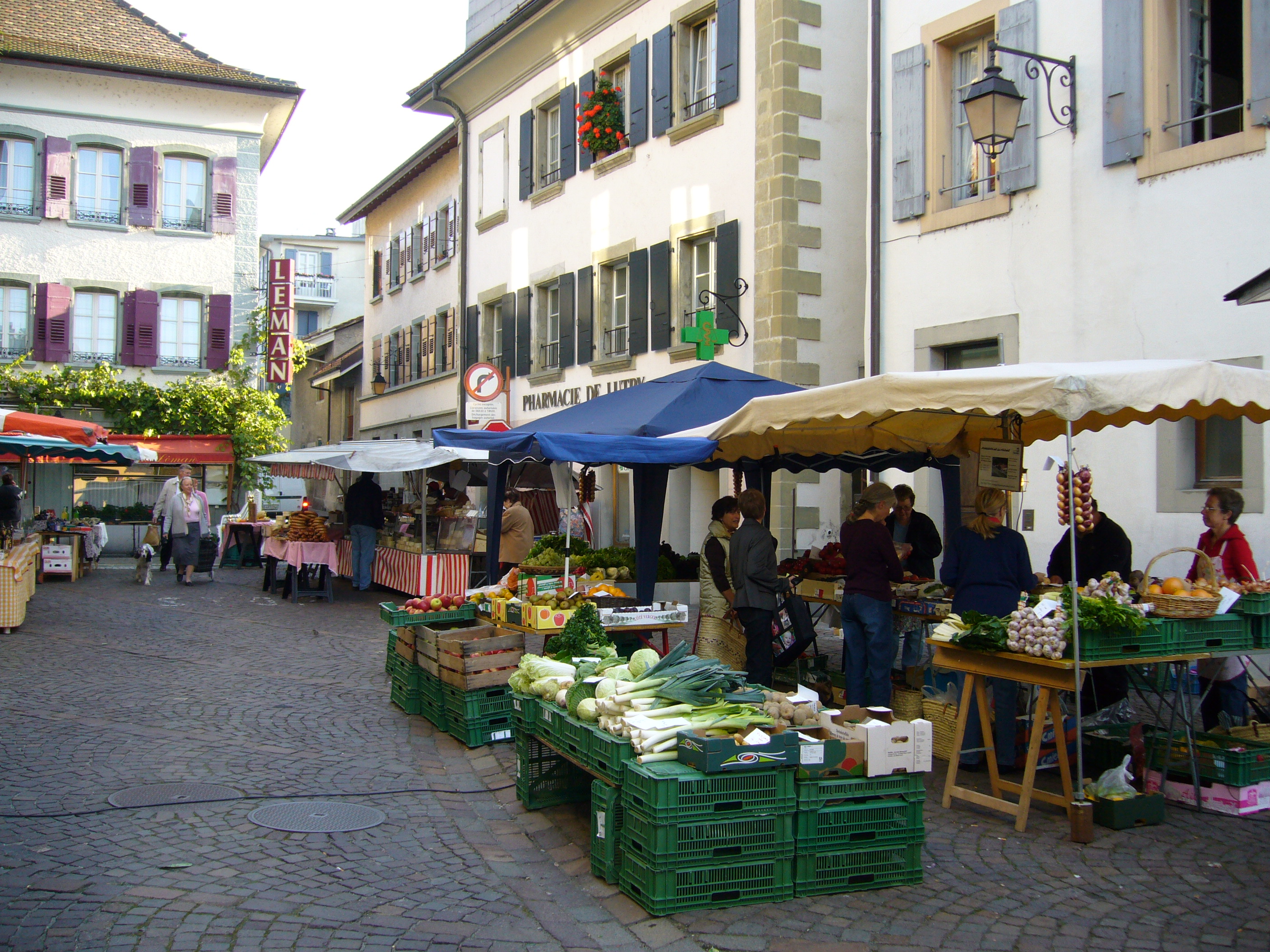
Market in Lutry

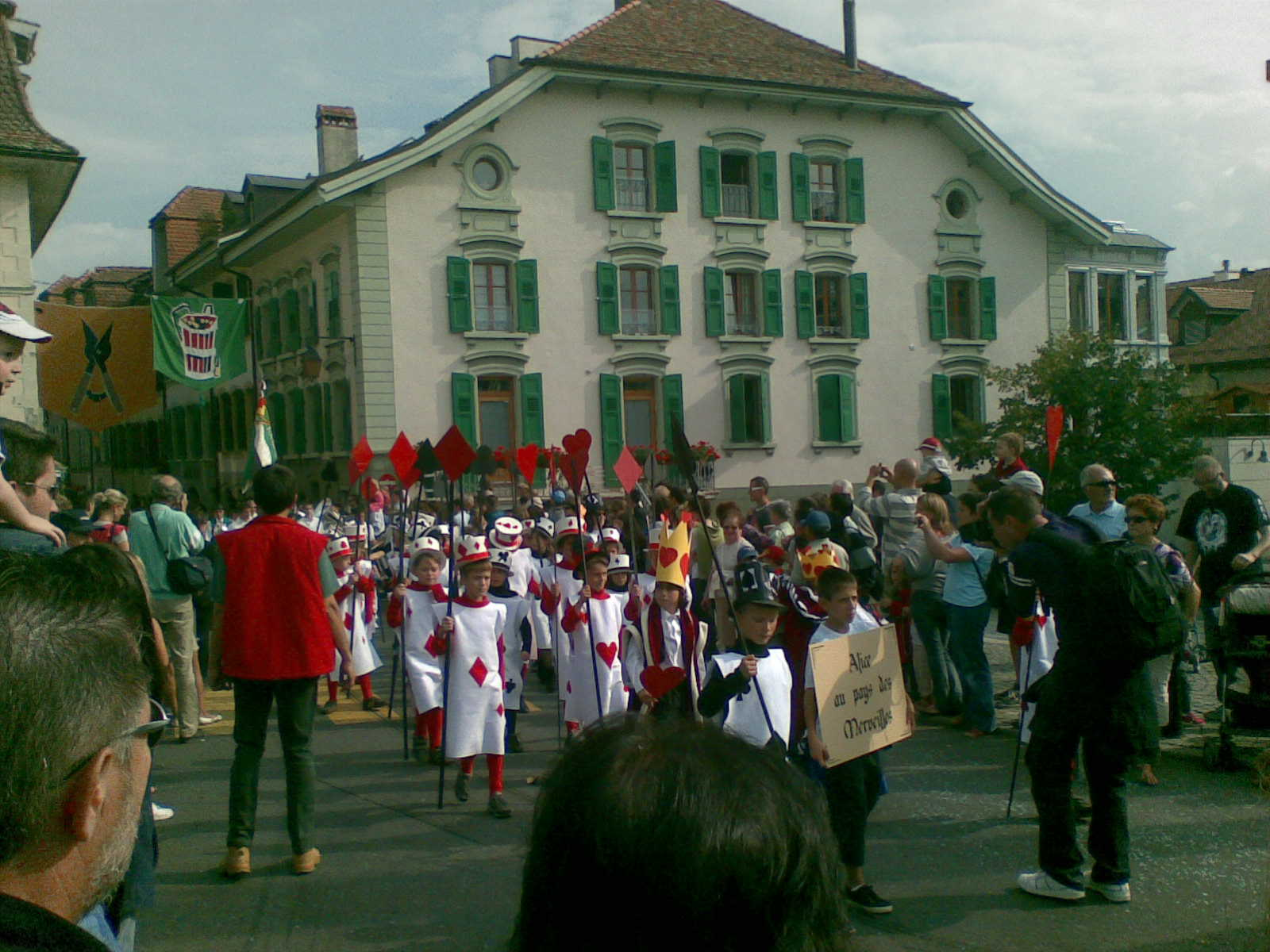
Grape Harvest Festival in Lutry

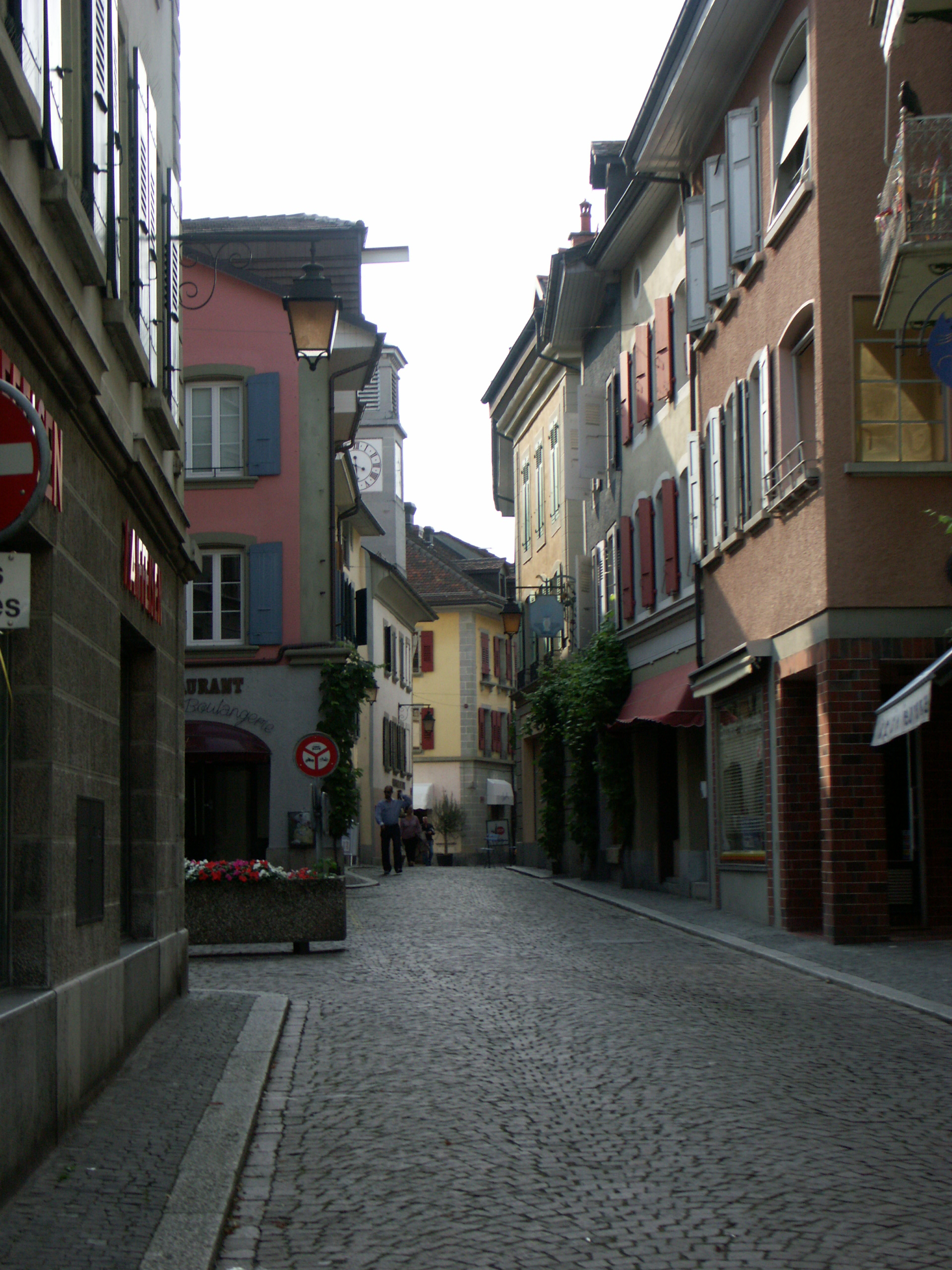
Grand'Rue in Lutry

Lutry has a population (as of December 2020) of 10,459. As of 2008, 23.5% of the population are resident foreign nationals. Over the last 10 years (1999–2009) the population has changed at a rate of 14.4%. It has changed at a rate of 18.7% due to migration and at a rate of −4.4% due to births and deaths.

Most of the population (as of 2000) speaks French (6,872 or 83.1%), with German being second most common (530 or 6.4%) and English being third (310 or 3.7%). There are 153 people who speak Italian and 6 people who speak Romansh.

Of the population in the municipality 1,634 or about 19.8% were born in Lutry and lived there in 2000. There were 2,747 or 33.2% who were born in the same canton, while 1,582 or 19.1% were born somewhere else in Switzerland, and 2,097 or 25.4% were born outside of Switzerland.

In 2008 there were 47 live births to Swiss citizens and 23 births to non-Swiss citizens, and in same time span there were 110 deaths of Swiss citizens and 9 non-Swiss citizen deaths. Ignoring immigration and emigration, the population of Swiss citizens decreased by 63 while the foreign population increased by 14. There were 6 Swiss men and 3 Swiss women who emigrated from Switzerland. At the same time, there were 48 non-Swiss men and 66 non-Swiss women who immigrated from another country to Switzerland. The total Swiss population change in 2008 (from all sources, including moves across municipal borders) was an increase of 12 and the non-Swiss population increased by 236 people. This represents a population growth rate of 2.8%.

The age distribution, as of 2009, in Lutry is; 904 children or 9.7% of the population are between 0 and 9 years old and 1,098 teenagers or 11.8% are between 10 and 19. Of the adult population, 791 people or 8.5% of the population are between 20 and 29 years old. 1,138 people or 12.3% are between 30 and 39, 1,551 people or 16.7% are between 40 and 49, and 1,281 people or 13.8% are between 50 and 59. The senior population distribution is 1,204 people or 13.0% of the population are between 60 and 69 years old, 713 people or 7.7% are between 70 and 79, there are 472 people or 5.1% who are between 80 and 89, and there are 128 people or 1.4% who are 90 and older.

As of 2000, there were 3,161 people who were single and never married in the municipality. There were 3,974 married individuals, 562 widows or widowers and 573 individuals who are divorced.

As of 2000, there were 3,579 private households in the municipality, and an average of 2.2 persons per household. There were 1,251 households that consist of only one person and 185 households with five or more people. Out of a total of 3,656 households that answered this question, 34.2% were households made up of just one person and there were 27 adults who lived with their parents. Of the rest of the households, there are 1,030 married couples without children, 1,044 married couples with children. There were 168 single parents with a child or children. There were 59 households that were made up of unrelated people and 77 households that were made up of some sort of institution or another collective housing.

In 2000 there were 982 single family homes (or 57.1% of the total) out of a total of 1,721 inhabited buildings. There were 398 multi-family buildings (23.1%), along with 256 multi-purpose buildings that were mostly used for housing (14.9%) and 85 other use buildings (commercial or industrial) that also had some housing (4.9%). Of the single family homes 130 were built before 1919, while 124 were built between 1990 and 2000. The greatest number of single family homes (213) were built between 1981 and 1990. The most multi-family homes (106) were built before 1919 and the next most (62) were built between 1971 and 1980. There were 16 multi-family houses built between 1996 and 2000.

In 2000 there were 3,964 apartments in the municipality. The most common apartment size was 3 rooms of which there were 992. There were 226 single room apartments and 1,333 apartments with five or more rooms. Of these apartments, a total of 3,420 apartments (86.3% of the total) were permanently occupied, while 464 apartments (11.7%) were seasonally occupied and 80 apartments (2.0%) were empty. As of 2009, the construction rate of new housing units was 9.2 new units per 1000 residents. The vacancy rate for the municipality, in 2010, was 0.49%.

The historical population is given in the following chart:

== Heritage sites of national significance ==
Lutry Castle or Rôdeurs Castle, the Roman Catholic Church of Saint-Martin, the Swiss Reformed Church of Saint-Martin, the Gothic facade house, and part of the UNESCO World Heritage Site: Lavaux, Vineyard Terraces are listed as Swiss heritage site of national significance. The entire town of Lutry and the hamlets of Châtelard and Savuit are part of the Inventory of Swiss Heritage Sites.

The castle was built in the 15th and 16th centuries as the home of the Bishop of Lausanne's representative, the Mayor de Lutry family. The large gate house into the castle was built around the end of the 16th century, while the large coat of arms is from 1640.

The Reformed Church of Saint-Martin was built on the foundation of an earlier Romanesque priory church. The current church was built in multiple stages. The polygonal choir is from 1260. The nave and northern side chapels were built in the 14th and 15th centuries. The church tower is from 1544. In 1570 the west facade was replaced with a Renaissance style portal and surrounded with sculptures. The interior is decorated with paintings by the Flemish artist Humbert Mareschet from 1577.

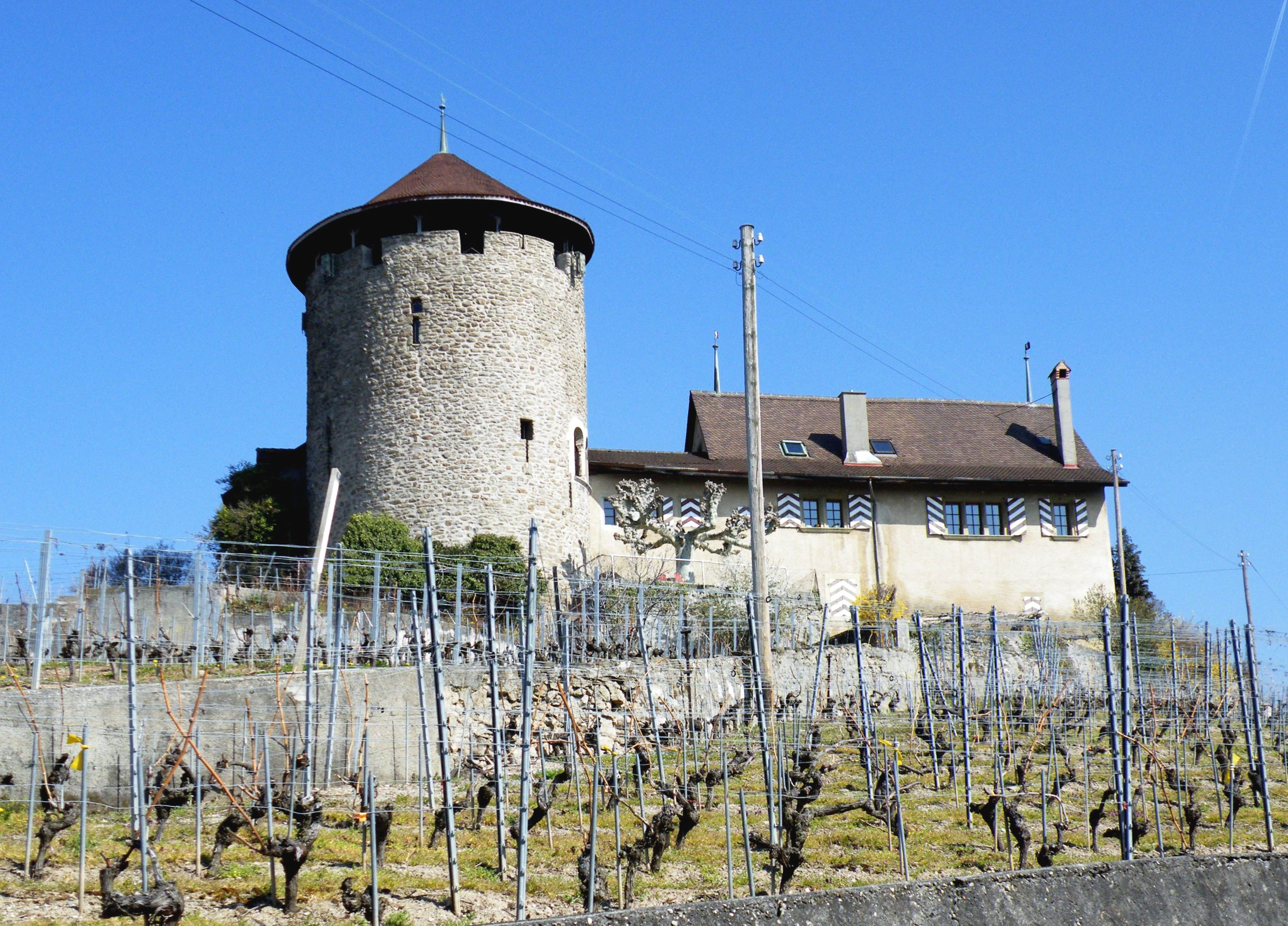
Lutry castle

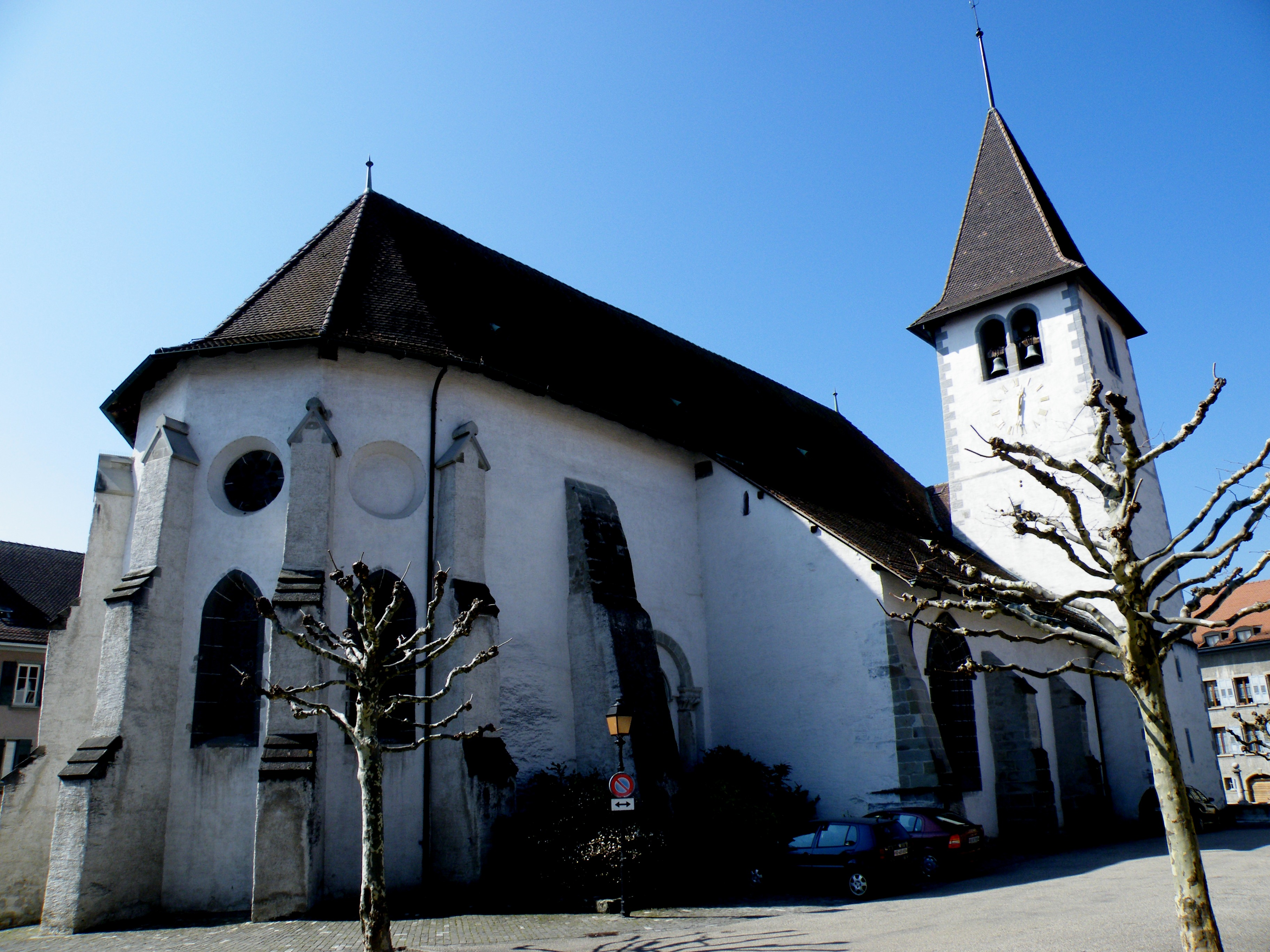
11th-century church

== Politics ==
In the 2007 federal election the most popular party was the SVP, that received 19.12% of the vote. The next three most popular parties were the FDP (17.66%), the SP (16.84%) and the Green Party (16.7%). In the federal election, a total of 2,849 votes were cast, and the voter turnout was 51.1%. In 2021, Charles Monod (FDP) was elected as mayor (syndic) until 2026. The municipality's government is, as of 2025, composed of four FDP politicians (Charles Monod, Pierre-Alexandre Schlaeppi, Etienne Blanc and Patrick Sutter) and of one socialist politician (Alain Amy).

== Economy ==
As of 2010, Lutry had an unemployment rate of 3.4%. As of 2008, there were 96 people employed in the primary economic sector and about 33 businesses involved in this sector. 308 people were employed in the secondary sector there were 55 businesses in this sector. 1,853 people were employed in the tertiary sector, with 326 businesses in this sector. There were 4,037 residents of the municipality who were employed in some capacity, of which females made up 43.3% of the workforce.

In 2008 the total number of full-time equivalent jobs was 1,910. The number of jobs in the primary sector was 76, of which 72 were in agriculture and 4 were in forestry or lumber production. The number of jobs in the secondary sector was 284 of which 49 or (17.3%) were in manufacturing and 167 (58.8%) were in construction. The number of jobs in the tertiary sector was 1,550. In the tertiary sector; 468 or 30.2% were in wholesale or retail sales or the repair of motor vehicles, 55 or 3.5% were in the movement and storage of goods, 143 or 9.2% were in a hotel or restaurant, 48 or 3.1% were in the information industry, 50 or 3.2% were the insurance or financial industry, 152 or 9.8% were technical professionals or scientists, 94 or 6.1% were in education and 285 or 18.4% were in health care.

In 2000, there were 1,269 workers who commuted into the municipality and 3,112 workers who commuted away. The municipality is a net exporter of workers, with about 2.5 workers leaving the municipality for every one entering. Of the working population, 18.8% used public transportation to get to work, and 64% used a private car.

== Religion ==
From the 2000 census, 2,752 or 33.3% were Roman Catholic, while 3,492 or 42.2% belonged to the Swiss Reformed Church. Of the rest of the population, there were 99 members of an Orthodox church (or about 1.20% of the population), there were 13 individuals (or about 0.16% of the population) who belonged to the Christian Catholic Church, and there were 244 individuals (or about 2.95% of the population) who belonged to another Christian church. There were 68 individuals (or about 0.82% of the population) who were Jewish, and 113 (or about 1.37% of the population) who were Islamic. There were 12 individuals who were Buddhist, 6 individuals who were Hindu and 14 individuals who belonged to another church. 1,181 (or about 14.28% of the population) belonged to no church, are agnostic or atheist, and 374 individuals (or about 4.52% of the population) did not answer the question.

== Education ==
In Lutry about 2,848 or (34.4%) of the population have completed non-mandatory upper secondary education, and 2,214 or (26.8%) have completed additional higher education (either university or a Fachhochschule). Of the 2,214 who completed tertiary schooling, 47.4% were Swiss men, 28.1% were Swiss women, 14.0% were non-Swiss men and 10.5% were non-Swiss women.

In the 2009/2010 school year there were a total of 872 students in the Lutry school district. In the Vaud cantonal school system, two years of non-obligatory pre-school are provided by the political districts. During the school year, the political district provided pre-school care for a total of 665 children of which 232 children (34.9%) received subsidized pre-school care. The canton's primary school program requires students to attend for four years. There were 428 students in the municipal primary school program. The obligatory lower secondary school program lasts for six years and there were 438 students in those schools. There were also 6 students who were home schooled or attended another non-traditional school.

As of 2000, there were 48 students in Lutry who came from another municipality, while 732 residents attended schools outside the municipality.

== Transportation ==
The municipality has three railway stations: Bossière and La Conversion on the Lausanne–Bern line and Lutry on the Simplon line. Different buses from the Transports publics de la région lausannoise also travel in Lutry, as the bus 68, that travels from Lutry town to La-Croix-sur-Lutry, the buses 21 and 47, that travel between Lutry and Pully and the 9 that travels between Lutry and Lausanne.

== Notable people ==
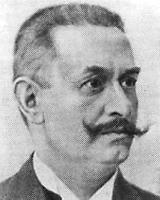
Eugène Ruffy, 1890s

=== People born in Lutry ===
- Victor Ruffy (1823 in Lutry – 1869) a Swiss politician, on the Federal Council of Switzerland from 1867
- Eugène Ruffy (1854 in Lutry – 1919) a Swiss politician, on the Swiss Federal Council 1893–1899

=== People dead in Lutry ===
- Frederick, Burgrave of Dohna (1621–1688) a German nobleman and governor of the Principality of Orange
- Alfred Pochon (1878–1959) a Swiss musician
- Edmond Jaloux (1878–1949) a French novelist, essayist and critic
- Bernard Reichel (1901–1992) a 20th-century Swiss classical composer
- Catherine Kousmine (1904–1992) a Russian scientist who believed in nutritionally based medicine
- Appel Ooiman (1905–1971) a Dutch rower, competed at the 1928 Summer Olympics
- Fernand Jaccard (1907–2008) a Swiss football midfielder and manager
- Jacques Aubert (1916–1995) a Swiss entomologist
- Vince Taylor (1939–1991) a British rock and roll singer, primarily known in France
