= La Conversion railway station =

Railway station in Lutry, Switzerland

La Conversion
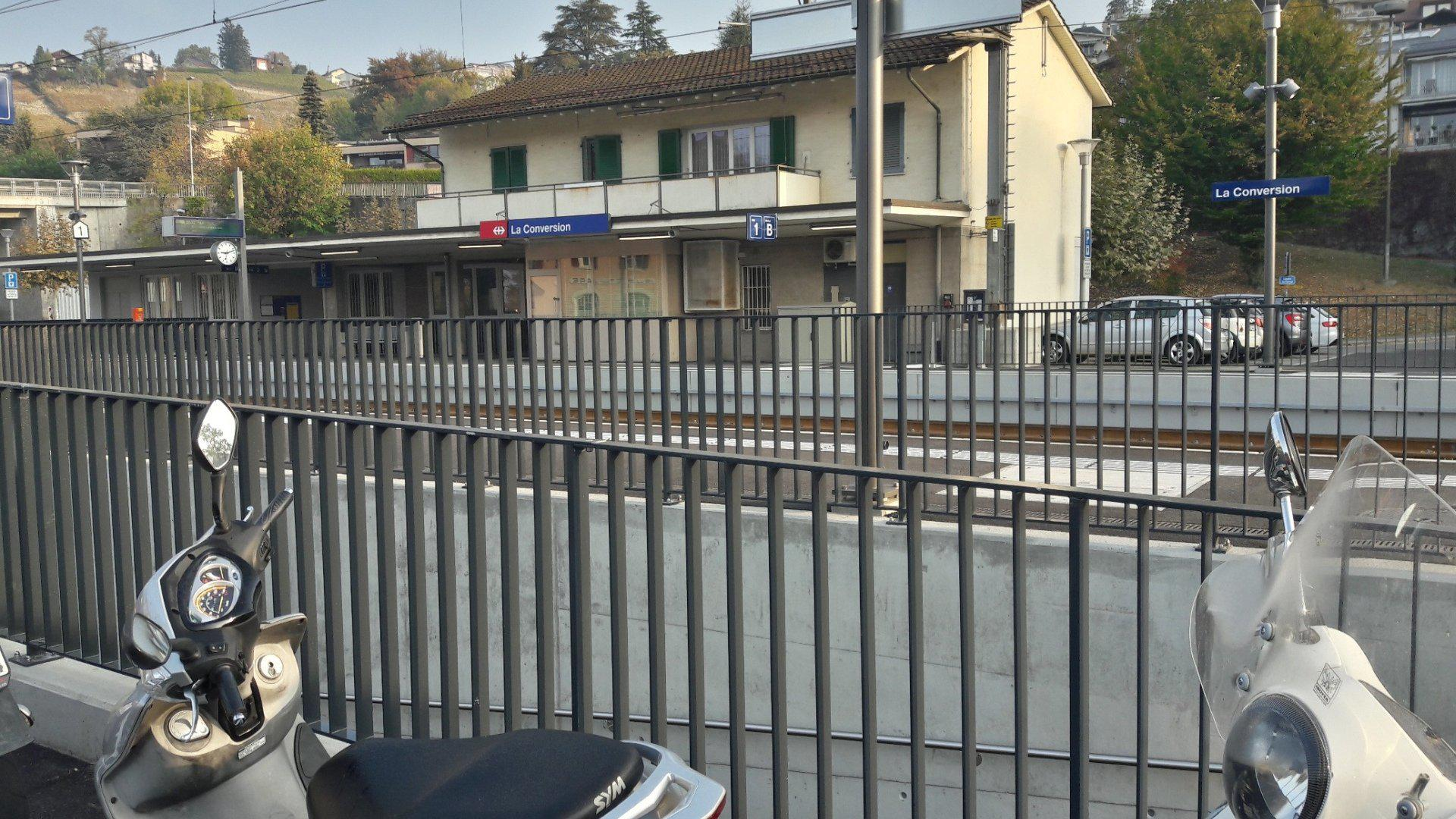
- The station in 2018

General information
- Location: Lutry; Switzerland
- Coordinates: 46°30′47″N 6°40′42″E
- Elevation: 501 m (1,644 ft)
- Owner: Swiss Federal Railways
- Line: Lausanne–Bern line
- Distance: 4.0 km (2.5 mi) from Lausanne
- Platforms: 2 side platforms
- Tracks: 2
- Train operators: Swiss Federal Railways
- Connections: tl buses

Construction
- Parking: Yes (62 spaces)
- Cycle facilities: Yes (4 spaces)
- Accessible: Yes

Other information
- Station code: 8504010 (CVN)
- Fare zone: 12 (mobilis)

Passengers
- 2023: 1'100 per weekday (SBB)

Services
Preceding station	RER Vaud	Following station
Pully-Nord towards Lausanne	S40	Grandvaux towards Fribourg/Freiburg
Pully-Nord towards Lausanne	S41	Bossière towards Fribourg/Freiburg
Location

La Conversion railway station (French: Gare de La Conversion) is a railway station in the municipality of Lutry, in the Swiss canton of Vaud. It is an intermediate stop on the standard gauge Lausanne–Bern line of Swiss Federal Railways.

== Services ==
As of the December 2024 timetable change, the following services stop at La Conversion:

- RER Vaud S40 / S41: half-hourly service between Lausanne and Fribourg/Freiburg.
