= Savigny, Switzerland =

Savigny
- Municipality
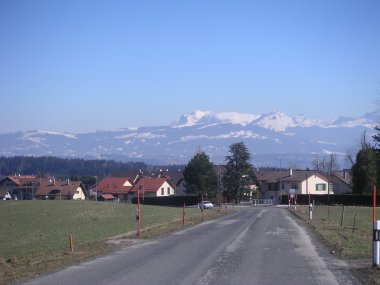
- Mollie-Margot village

- Flag Coat of arms
- Location of Savigny
- Location within Switzerland Location within Canton of Vaud
- Coordinates: 46°34′N 6°43′E
- Country: Switzerland
- Canton: Vaud
- District: Lavaux-Oron

Government
  - Mayor: Syndic

Area
  - Total: 16.02 km^{2} (6.19 sq mi)
- Elevation: 799 m (2,621 ft)

Population (2000)
  - Total: 3,230
  - Density: 202/km^{2} (522/sq mi)
- Demonym: Savignolans
- Time zone: UTC+01:00 (CET)
  - Summer (DST): UTC+02:00 (CEST)
- Postal code: 1073
- SFOS number: 5611
- ISO 3166 code: CH-VD
- Surrounded by: Belmont-sur-Lausanne, Forel (Lavaux), Les Cullayes, Lausanne, Lutry, Montpreveyres, Pully, Villette (Lavaux)
- Website: www.savigny.ch

Savigny (French pronunciation: [saviɲi]) is a municipality in Switzerland in the canton of Vaud, located in the district of Lavaux-Oron.

== History ==
Savigny is first mentioned in 1224 as Savignie. It was part of Lutry until 1823 when it separated to become an independent municipality.

== Geography ==
Savigny has an area, as of 2009, of 16.02 square kilometres (6.19 mi^{2}). Of this area, 9.22 km^{2} (3.56 mi^{2} or 57.6%) is used for agricultural purposes, while 4.87 km^{2} (1.88 mi^{2} or 30.4%) is forested. Of the rest of the land, 1.96 km^{2} (0.76 mi^{2} or 12.2%) is settled (buildings or roads) and 1 ha (2.5 acres or 0.1%) is unproductive land.

Of the built up area, housing and buildings made up 7.6% and transportation infrastructure made up 2.9%. Power and water infrastructure as well as other special developed areas made up 1.2% of the area Out of the forested land, 28.2% of the total land area is heavily forested and 2.2% is covered with orchards or small clusters of trees. Of the agricultural land, 45.8% is used for growing crops and 9.8% is pastures, while 1.9% is used for orchards or vine crops.

The municipality was part of the Lavaux District until it was dissolved on 31 August 2006, and Savigny became part of the new district of Lavaux-Oron.

Savigny lies 793 m (2,602 ft) above sea-level, 8 km (5 mi) east from Lausanne the capital of its canton. The thinly distributed community stretches across the Swiss landscape and ends on the Jorat to the south east overlooking Lake Geneva.

The district encompasses an area that includes a part of the Molasse peaks in the Jorat. It consists of the hamlets of Mollie-Margot, La Goille, Le Martinet and La Claie-aux-Moines along with scattered settlements.

== Coat of arms ==
The blazon of the municipal coat of arms is Per fess Gules and Argent, overall three Pine-trees Vert issuant from a Coupeaux Sable.

== Demographics ==
Savigny has a population (as of December 2020) of 3,349. As of 2008, 19.2% of the population are resident foreign nationals. Over the last 10 years (1999–2009 ) the population has changed at a rate of 10.8%. It has changed at a rate of 6.8% due to migration and at a rate of 4% due to births and deaths.

Most of the population (as of 2000) speaks French (2,667 or 86.5%), with German being second most common (232 or 7.5%) and English being third (48 or 1.6%). There are thirty people who speak Italian and two people who speak Romansh.

Of the population in the municipality 643 or about 20.8% were born in Savigny and lived there in 2000. There were 1,139 or 36.9% who were born in the same canton, while 588 or 19.1% were born somewhere else in Switzerland, and 627 or 20.3% were born outside of Switzerland.

In 2008 there were thirty-four live births to Swiss citizens and two births to non-Swiss citizens, and in same time span there were sixteen deaths of Swiss citizens and two non-Swiss citizen deaths. Ignoring immigration and emigration, the population of Swiss citizens increased by eighteen while the foreign population remained the same. There were two Swiss men and one Swiss woman who immigrated back to Switzerland. At the same time, there were thirty-three non-Swiss men and thirty-six non-Swiss women who immigrated from another country to Switzerland. The total Swiss population change in 2008 (from all sources, including moves across municipal borders) was a decrease of twenty-nine and the non-Swiss population increased by sixty-six people. This represents a population growth rate of 1.1%.

The age distribution, as of 2009, in Savigny is; 360 children or 10.7% of the population are between 0 and 9 years old and 410 teenagers or 12.2% are between 10 and 19. Of the adult population, 370 people or 11.0% of the population are between 20 and 29 years old. 427 people or 12.7% are between 30 and 39, 552 people or 16.4% are between 40 and 49, and 508 people or 15.1% are between 50 and 59. The senior population distribution is 389 people or 11.6% of the population are between 60 and 69 years old, 219 people or 6.5% are between 70 and 79, there are 115 people or 3.4% who are between 80 and 89, and there are 15 people or 0.4% who are 90 and older.

As of 2000, there were 1,309 people who were single and never married in the municipality. There were 1,496 married individuals, 127 widows or widowers and 152 individuals who are divorced.

As of 2000, there were 1,290 private households in the municipality, and an average of 2.3 persons per household. There were 426 households that consist of only one person and 79 households with five or more people. Out of a total of 1,336 households that answered this question, 31.9% were households made up of just one person and there were 10 adults who lived with their parents. Of the rest of the households, there are 351 married couples without children, 412 married couples with children There were 66 single parents with a child or children. There were 25 households that were made up of unrelated people and 46 households that were made up of some sort of institution or another collective housing.

In 2000 there were 504 single family homes (or 63.8% of the total) out of a total of 790 inhabited buildings. There were 123 multi-family buildings (15.6%), along with 121 multi-purpose buildings that were mostly used for housing (15.3%) and 42 other use buildings (commercial or industrial) that also had some housing (5.3%). Of the single family homes 46 were built before 1919, while 45 were built between 1990 and 2000. The greatest number of single family homes (156) were built between 1971 and 1980. The most multi-family homes (33) were built between 1971 and 1980 and the next most (24) were built before 1919. There were 3 multi-family houses built between 1996 and 2000.

In 2000 there were 1,302 apartments in the municipality. The most common apartment size was 3 rooms of which there were 329. There were 62 single room apartments and 469 apartments with five or more rooms. Of these apartments, a total of 1,135 apartments (87.2% of the total) were permanently occupied, while 141 apartments (10.8%) were seasonally occupied and 26 apartments (2.0%) were empty. As of 2009, the construction rate of new housing units was 3.6 new units per 1000 residents. The vacancy rate for the municipality, in 2010, was 0.14%.

The historical population is given in the following chart:

== Politics ==
In the 2007 federal election the most popular party was the SVP which received 19.39% of the vote. The next three most popular parties were the SP (19.17%), the FDP (18.41%) and the Green Party (15.25%). In the federal election, a total of 1,029 votes were cast, and the voter turnout was 49.0%.

== Economy ==
As of 2010, Savigny had an unemployment rate of 3.5%. As of 2008, there were 98 people employed in the primary economic sector and about 44 businesses involved in this sector. 220 people were employed in the secondary sector and there were 20 businesses in this sector. 695 people were employed in the tertiary sector, with 81 businesses in this sector. There were 1,629 residents of the municipality who were employed in some capacity, of which females made up 44.0% of the workforce.

In 2008 the total number of full-time equivalent jobs was 836. The number of jobs in the primary sector was 71, of which 61 were in agriculture and 10 were in forestry or lumber production. The number of jobs in the secondary sector was 212 of which 7 or (3.3%) were in manufacturing, 17 or (8.0%) were in mining and 185 (87.3%) were in construction. The number of jobs in the tertiary sector was 553. In the tertiary sector; 70 or 12.7% were in wholesale or retail sales or the repair of motor vehicles, 83 or 15.0% were in the movement and storage of goods, 26 or 4.7% were in a hotel or restaurant, 2 or 0.4% were in the information industry, 6 or 1.1% were the insurance or financial industry, 30 or 5.4% were technical professionals or scientists, 50 or 9.0% were in education and 181 or 32.7% were in health care.

In 2000, there were 381 workers who commuted into the municipality and 1,183 workers who commuted away. The municipality is a net exporter of workers, with about 3.1 workers leaving the municipality for every one entering. About 2.9% of the workforce coming into Savigny are coming from outside Switzerland. Of the working population, 12.5% used public transportation to get to work, and 67.6% used a private car.

== Religion ==
From the 2000 census, 836 or 27.1% were Roman Catholic, while 1,462 or 47.4% belonged to the Swiss Reformed Church. Of the rest of the population, there were 29 members of an Orthodox church (or about 0.94% of the population), and there were 117 individuals (or about 3.79% of the population) who belonged to another Christian church. There were 10 individuals (or about 0.32% of the population) who were Jewish, and 41 (or about 1.33% of the population) who were Islamic. There were 3 individuals who were Buddhist, 8 individuals who were Hindu and 2 individuals who belonged to another church. 507 (or about 16.44% of the population) belonged to no church, are agnostic or atheist, and 118 individuals (or about 3.83% of the population) did not answer the question.

== Education ==
In Savigny about 1,070 or (34.7%) of the population have completed non-mandatory upper secondary education, and 596 or (19.3%) have completed additional higher education (either university or a Fachhochschule). Of the 596 who completed tertiary schooling, 46.3% were Swiss men, 31.5% were Swiss women, 12.6% were non-Swiss men and 9.6% were non-Swiss women.

In the 2009/2010 school year there were a total of 381 students in the Savigny school district. In the Vaud cantonal school system, two years of non-obligatory pre-school are provided by the political districts. During the school year, the political district provided pre-school care for a total of 665 children of which 232 children (34.9%) received subsidized pre-school care. The canton's primary school program requires students to attend for four years. There were 214 students in the municipal primary school program. The obligatory lower secondary school program lasts for six years and there were 165 students in those schools. There were also 2 students who were home schooled or attended another non-traditional school.

As of 2000, there were 71 students in Savigny who came from another municipality, while 269 residents attended schools outside the municipality.
