= Lutry railway station =

Railway station in Lutry, Switzerland

Lutry
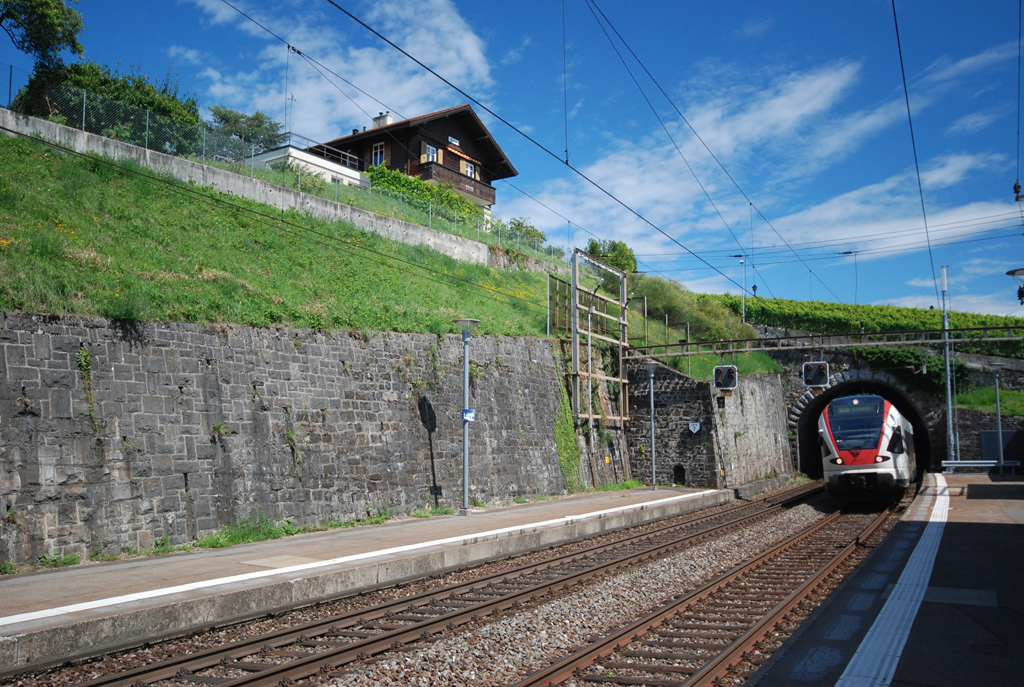
- The station platforms in 2011

General information
- Location: Lutry; Switzerland
- Coordinates: 46°30′14″N 6°41′26″E
- Elevation: 402 m (1,319 ft)
- Owner: Swiss Federal Railways
- Line: Simplon line
- Distance: 5.1 km (3.2 mi) from Lausanne
- Platforms: 2 (2 side platforms)
- Tracks: 2
- Train operators: Swiss Federal Railways
- Connections: tl buses

Construction
- Parking: Yes (48 spaces)
- Cycle facilities: Yes (21 spaces)
- Accessible: Yes

Other information
- Station code: 8501122 (LTY)
- Fare zone: 12 (mobilis)

Passengers
- 2023: 1'800 per weekday (SBB)

Services
Preceding station	RER Vaud	Following station
Pully towards Grandson	R1	Villette VD towards Bex
Pully towards Grandson	R2	Villette VD towards Bex
Pully towards Vallorbe	R3	Cully towards Vevey
Pully towards Le Brassus or Vallorbe	R4	Cully towards Vevey
Location

Lutry railway station (French: Gare de Lutry) is a railway station in the municipality of Lutry, in the Swiss canton of Vaud. It is an intermediate stop on the standard gauge Simplon line of Swiss Federal Railways.

== Services ==
As of the December 2024 timetable change, the following services stop at Lutry:

- RER Vaud:
  - R1 / R2: half-hourly service between Grandson and Cully.
  - R3 / R4: half-hourly (hourly on weekends) service between Vallorbe and Bex; hourly service to Le Brassus; limited service from Bex to St-Maurice.
