= Pully railway station =

Railway station in Pully, Switzerland

Pully
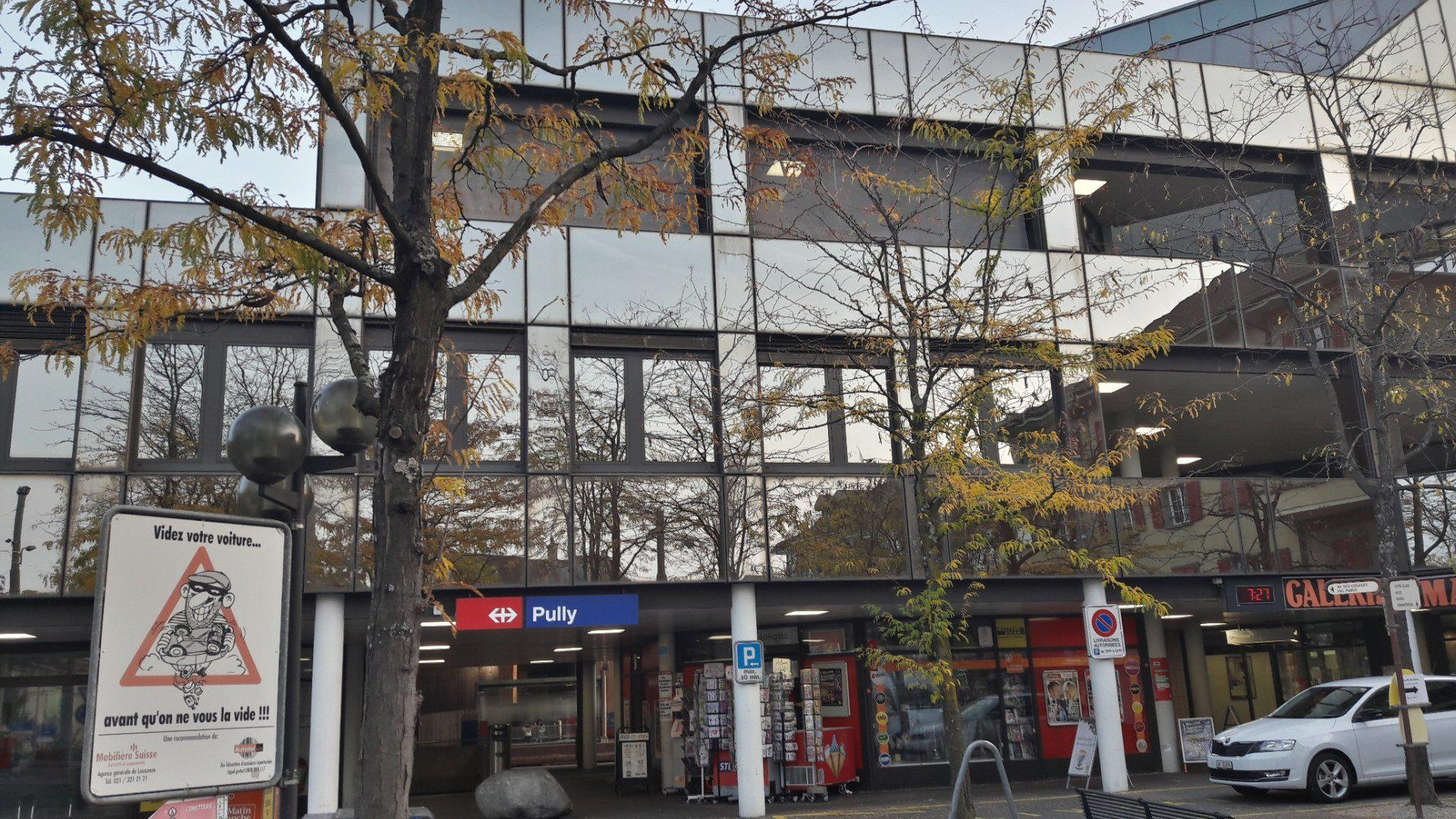
- The station building in 2018

General information
- Location: Pully; Switzerland
- Coordinates: 46°30′39″N 6°39′34″E
- Elevation: 424 m (1,391 ft)
- Owner: Swiss Federal Railways
- Line: Simplon line
- Distance: 2.5 km (1.6 mi) from Lausanne
- Platforms: 2 (2 side platforms)
- Tracks: 2
- Train operators: Swiss Federal Railways
- Connections: tl buses

Construction
- Parking: Yes
- Cycle facilities: Yes (15 spaces)
- Accessible: Yes

Other information
- Station code: 8501121 (PU)
- Fare zone: 11 and 12 (mobilis)

Passengers
- 2023: 3'200 per weekday (SBB)

Services
Preceding station	RER Vaud	Following station
Lausanne towards Grandson	R1	Lutry towards Bex
Lausanne towards Grandson	R2	Lutry towards Bex
Lausanne towards Vallorbe	R3	Lutry towards Vevey
Lausanne towards Le Brassus or Vallorbe	R4	Lutry towards Vevey
Location

Pully railway station (French: Gare de Pully) is a railway station in the municipality of Pully, in the Swiss canton of Vaud. It is an intermediate stop on the standard gauge Simplon line of Swiss Federal Railways. The station is approximately 600 metres (2,000 ft) south of Pully-Nord on the Lausanne–Bern line.

== Services ==
As of the December 2024 timetable change, the following services stop at Pully:

- RER Vaud:
  - R1 / R2: half-hourly service between Grandson and Cully.
  - R3 / R4: half-hourly (hourly on weekends) service between Vallorbe and Bex; hourly service to Le Brassus; limited service from Bex to St-Maurice.
