= Grandvaux railway station =

Railway station in Bourg-en-Lavaux, Switzerland

Grandvaux
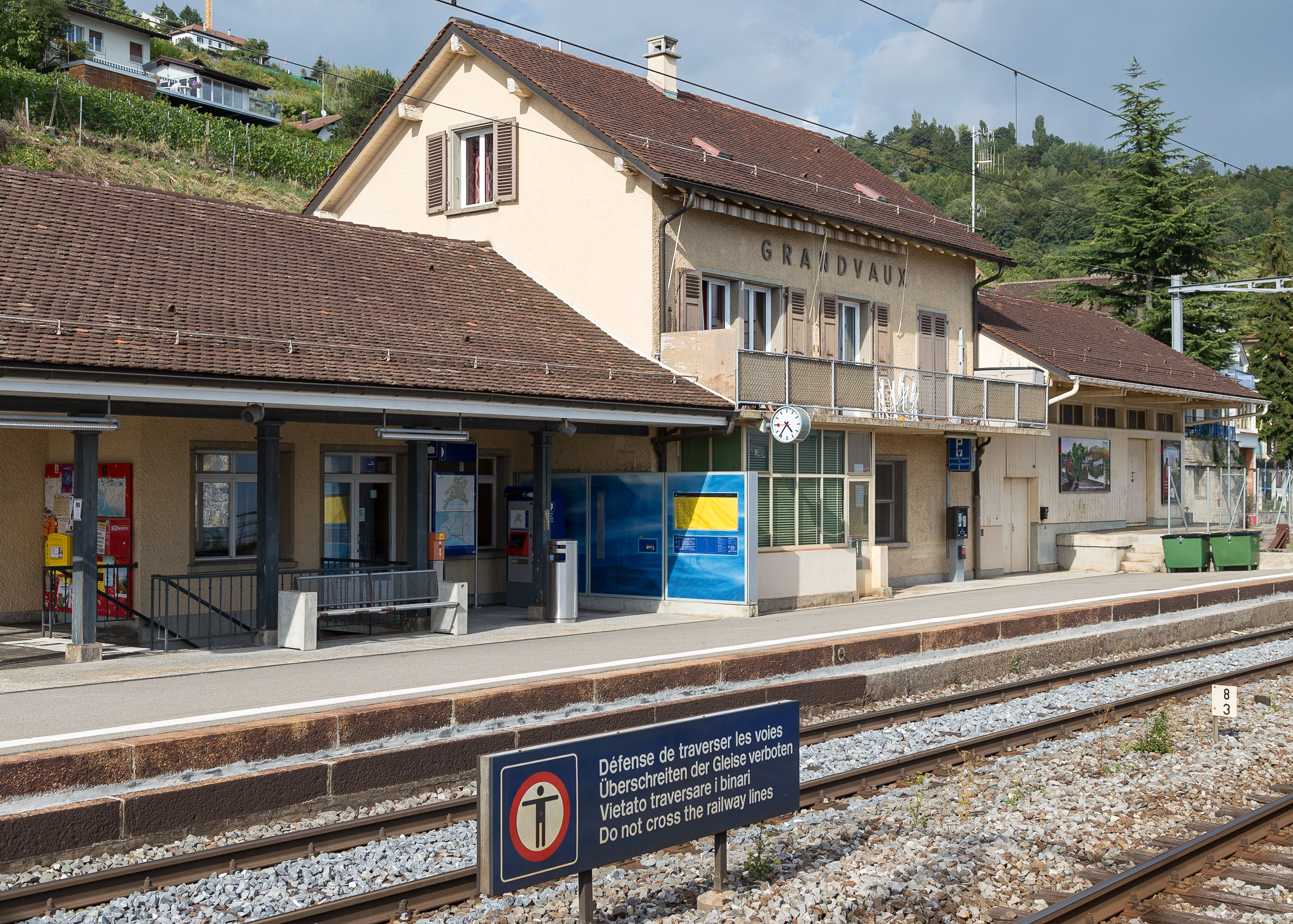
- The station in 2015

General information
- Location: Bourg-en-Lavaux; Switzerland
- Coordinates: 46°29′49″N 6°43′22″E
- Elevation: 565.065 m (1,853.89 ft)
- Owner: Swiss Federal Railways
- Line: Lausanne–Bern line
- Distance: 8.3 km (5.2 mi) from Lausanne
- Platforms: 2 side platforms
- Tracks: 2
- Train operators: Swiss Federal Railways
- Connections: CarPostal SA bus line

Construction
- Parking: Yes (42 spaces)
- Cycle facilities: Yes (20 spaces)
- Accessible: Partly

Other information
- Station code: 8504011 (GRV)
- Fare zone: 19 (mobilis)

Passengers
- 2023: 730 per weekday (SBB)

Services
Preceding station	RER Vaud	Following station
La Conversion towards Lausanne	S40	Puidoux towards Fribourg/Freiburg
Bossière towards Lausanne	S41	Puidoux towards Fribourg/Freiburg
Location

Grandvaux railway station (French: Gare de Grandvaux) is a railway station in the municipality of Bourg-en-Lavaux, in the Swiss canton of Vaud. It is an intermediate stop on the standard gauge Lausanne–Bern line of Swiss Federal Railways.

== Services ==
As of the December 2024 timetable change, the following services stop at Grandvaux:

- RER Vaud S40 / S41: half-hourly service between Lausanne and Fribourg/Freiburg.
