= Bossière railway station =

Railway station in Lutry, Switzerland

Bossière
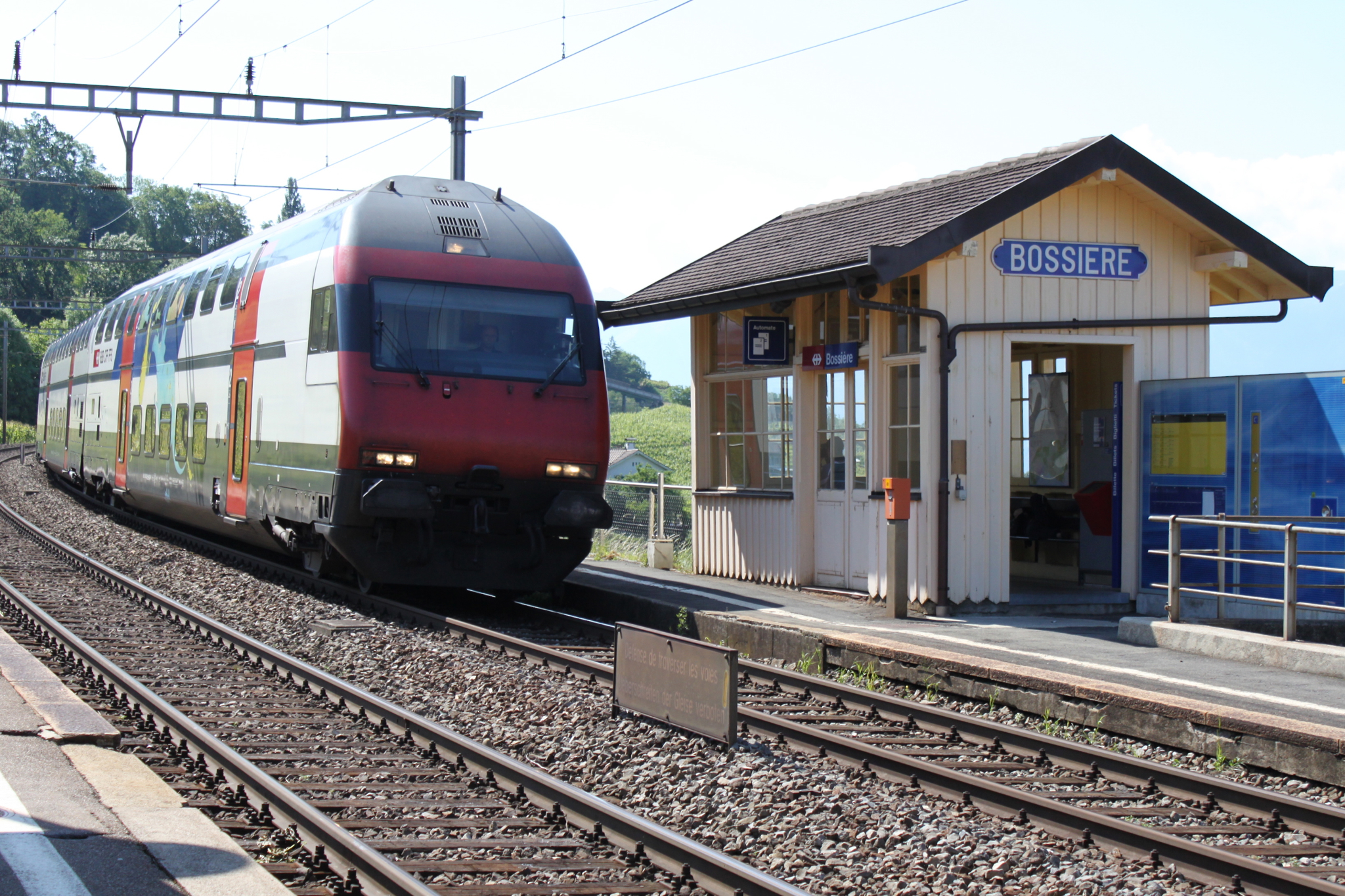
- An SBB train passes through the station in 2009

General information
- Location: Lutry; Switzerland
- Coordinates: 46°30′35″N 6°41′58″E
- Elevation: 524 m (1,719 ft)
- Owner: Swiss Federal Railways
- Line: Lausanne–Bern line
- Distance: 5.8 km (3.6 mi) from Lausanne
- Platforms: 2 (2 side platforms)
- Tracks: 2
- Train operators: Swiss Federal Railways
- Connections: tl buses

Construction
- Accessible: No

Other information
- Station code: 8504003 (BOSS)
- Fare zone: 12 (mobilis)

Passengers
- 2023: 140 per weekday (SBB)

Services
Preceding station	RER Vaud	Following station
La Conversion towards Lausanne	S41	Grandvaux towards Fribourg/Freiburg
Location

Bossière railway station (French: Gare de Bossière) is a railway station in the municipality of Lutry, in the Swiss canton of Vaud. It is an intermediate stop on the standard gauge Lausanne–Bern line of Swiss Federal Railways.

== Services ==
As of the December 2024 timetable change, the following services stop at Bossière:

- RER Vaud S41: hourly service between Lausanne and Fribourg/Freiburg.
