= Pully-Nord railway station =

Railway station in Pully, Switzerland

Pully-Nord
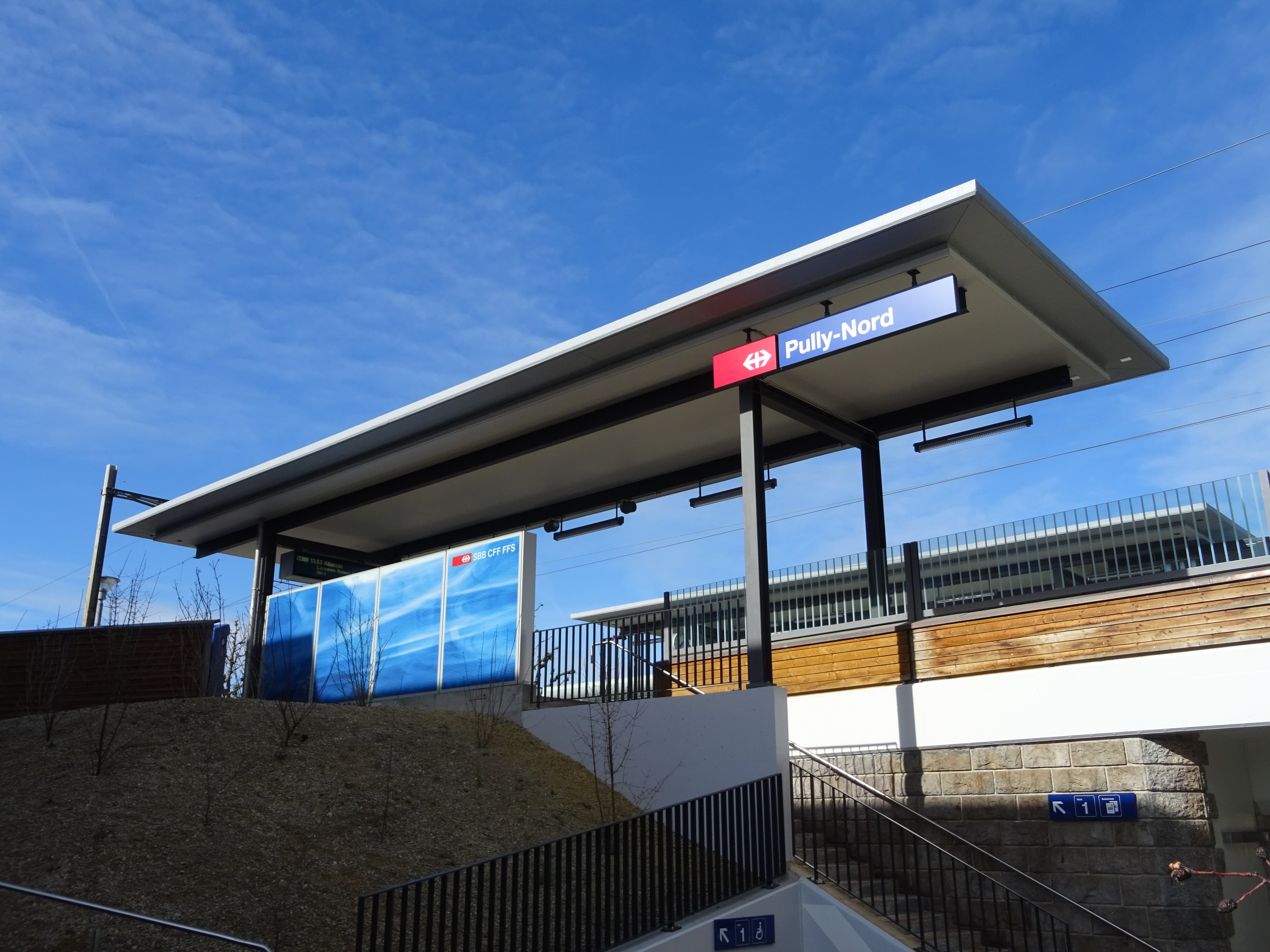
- The station platform in 2020

General information
- Location: Pully; Switzerland
- Coordinates: 46°30′53″N 6°39′29″E
- Elevation: 473 m (1,552 ft)
- Owner: Swiss Federal Railways
- Line: Lausanne–Bern line
- Distance: 2.4 km (1.5 mi) from Lausanne
- Platforms: 2 side platforms
- Tracks: 2
- Train operators: Swiss Federal Railways

Construction
- Cycle facilities: Yes (30 spaces)
- Accessible: Yes

Other information
- Station code: 8504000 (PUN)
- Fare zone: 11 and 12 (mobilis)

Passengers
- 2023: 1'100 per weekday (SBB)

Services
Preceding station	RER Vaud	Following station
Lausanne Terminus	S40	La Conversion towards Fribourg/Freiburg
Lausanne Terminus	S41	La Conversion towards Fribourg/Freiburg
Location

Pully-Nord railway station (French: Gare de Pully-Nord) is a railway station in the municipality of Pully, in the Swiss canton of Vaud. It is an intermediate stop on the standard gauge Lausanne–Bern line of Swiss Federal Railways. The station is approximately 600 metres (2,000 ft) north of Pully on the Simplon line.

== Services ==
As of the December 2024 timetable change, the following services stop at Pully-Nord:

- RER Vaud S40 / S41: half-hourly service between Lausanne and Fribourg/Freiburg.

== Gallery ==
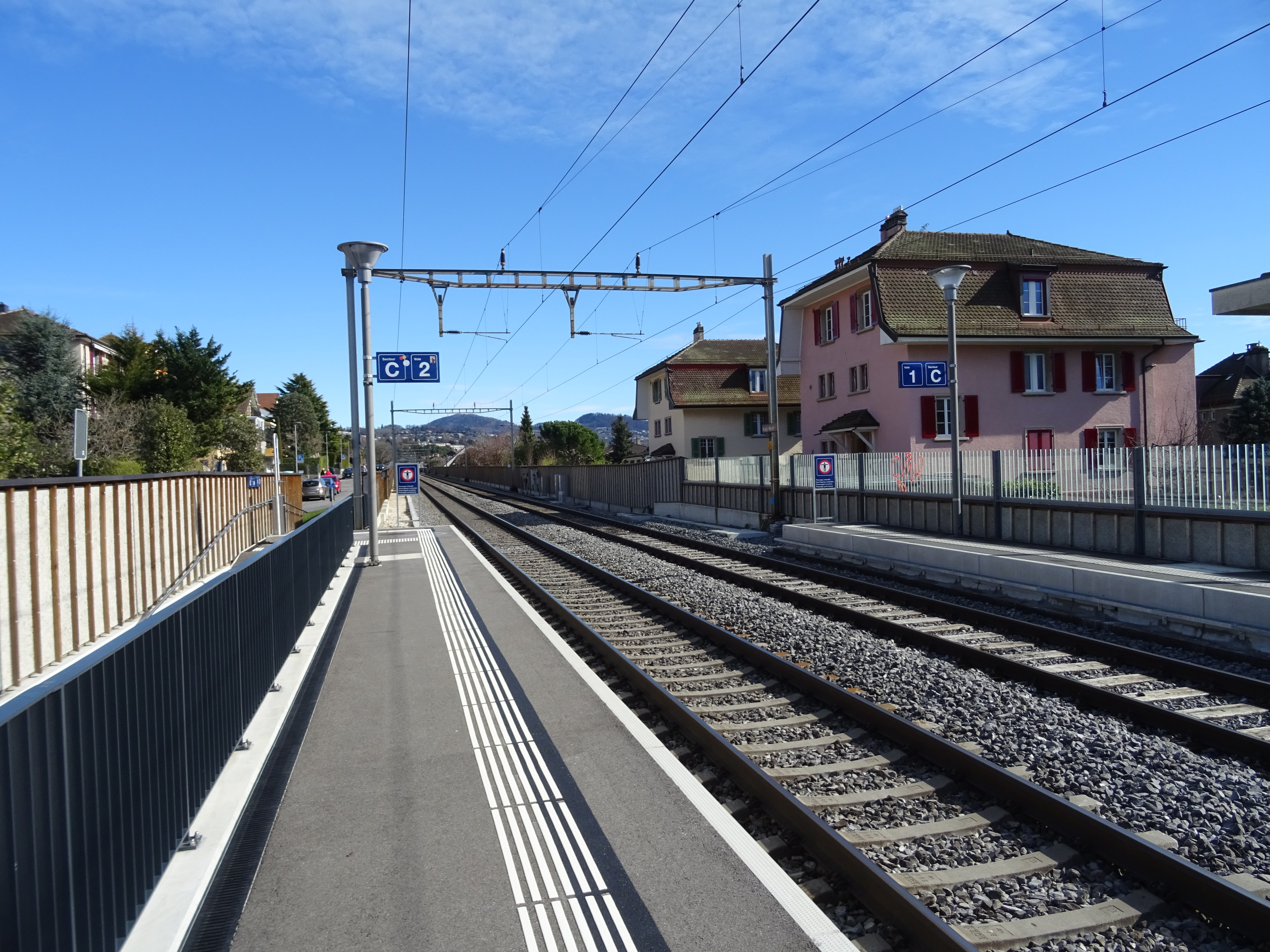
view in the direction of Palézieux (2020)

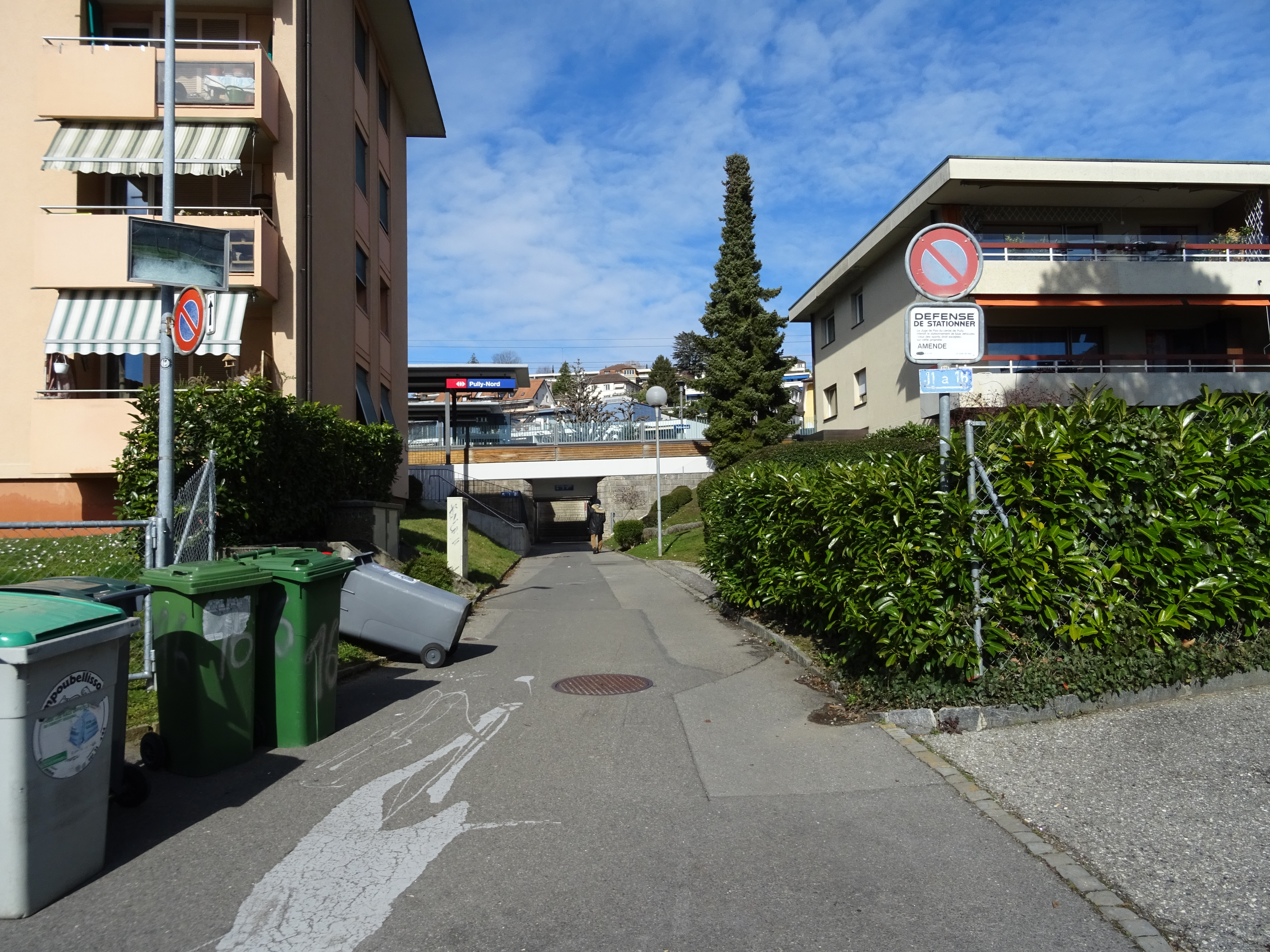
remote view of the station from below (2020)

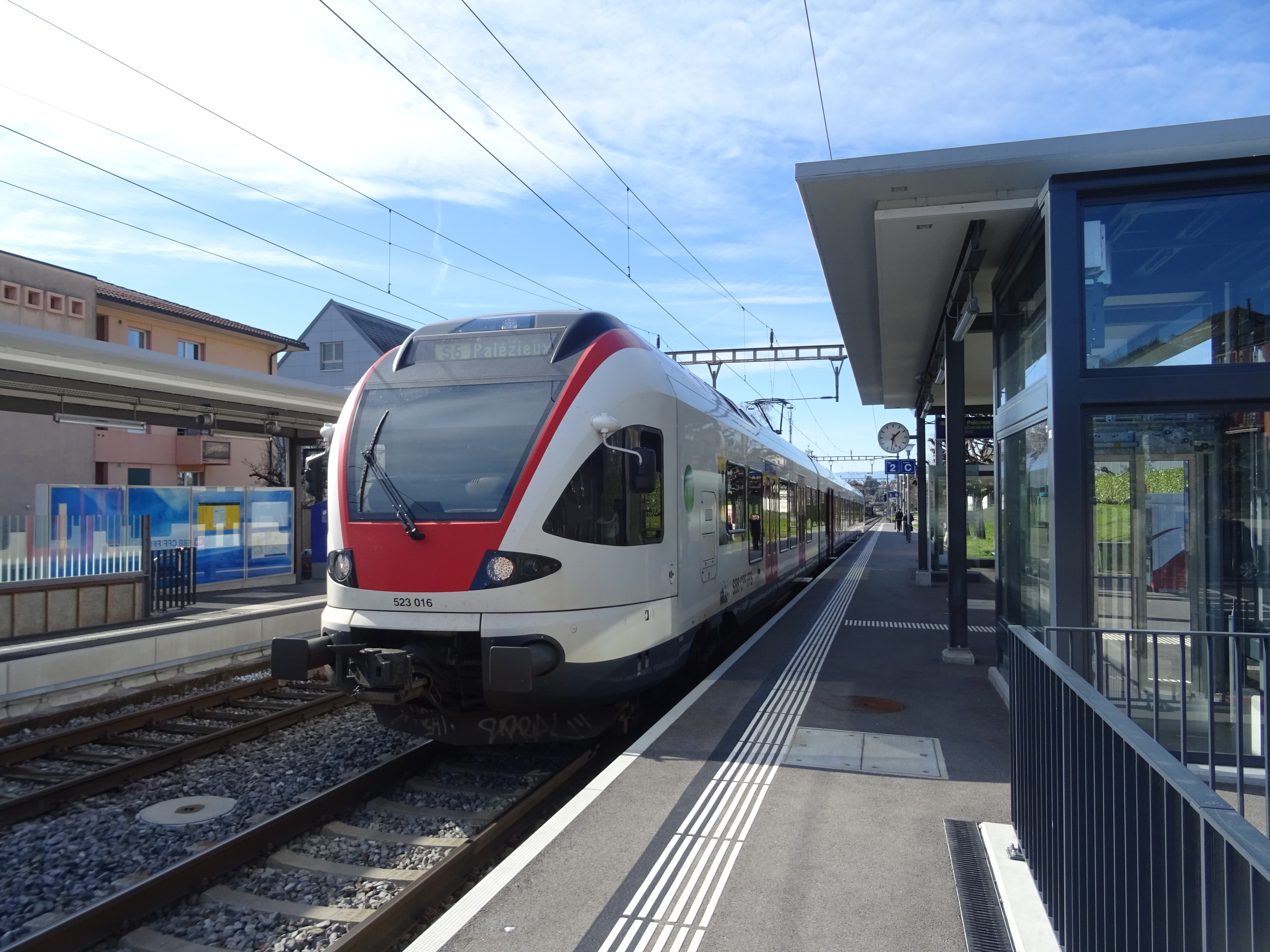
RABe 523 on track #2 (2020)
