= Belmont-sur-Lausanne =

- Municipality
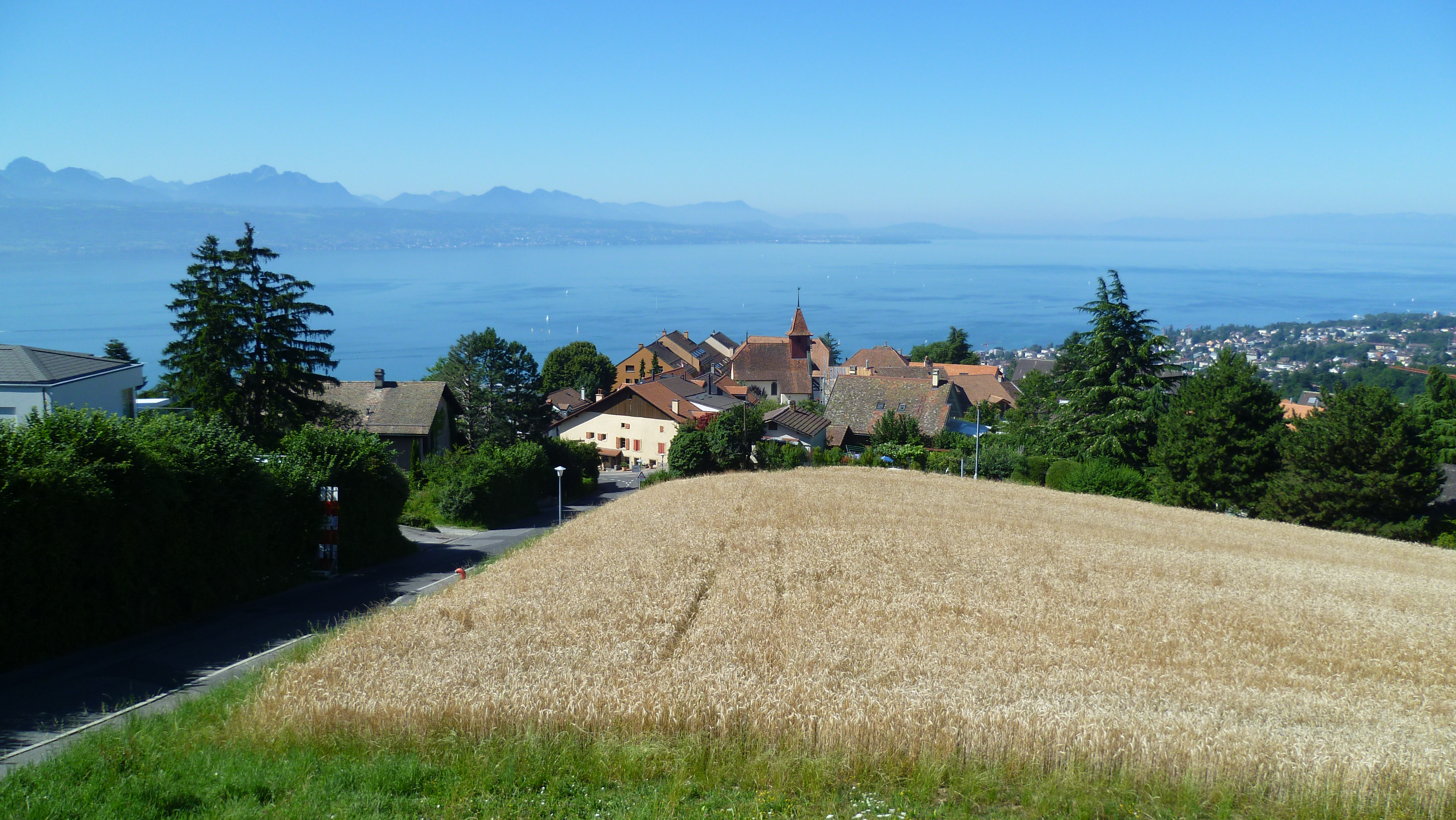
- View of Belmont-sur-Lausanne and Lake Geneva

- Flag Coat of arms
- Location of Belmont-sur-Lausanne
- Location within Switzerland Location within Canton of Vaud
- Coordinates: 46°31′N 06°41′E
- Country: Switzerland
- Canton: Vaud
- District: Lavaux-Oron

Government
  - Mayor: Syndic; Gustave Muheim

Area
  - Total: 2.65 km^{2} (1.02 sq mi)
- Elevation: 610 m (2,000 ft)

Population (2003)
  - Total: 2,762
  - Density: 1,040/km^{2} (2,700/sq mi)
- Time zone: UTC+01:00 (CET)
  - Summer (DST): UTC+02:00 (CEST)
- Postal code: 1092
- SFOS number: 5581
- ISO 3166 code: CH-VD
- Surrounded by: Lutry, Paudex, Pully, Savigny
- Website: www.belmont.ch

Belmont-sur-Lausanne (French pronunciation: [bɛlmɔ̃ syʁ lɔzan], literally Belmont on Lausanne) is a municipality in the district of Lavaux-Oron in the canton of Vaud in Switzerland.

It is a suburb of the city of Lausanne.

== History ==
Belmont-sur-Lausanne is first mentioned in 1228 as Belmunt sowie apud bellum Montem.

== Geography ==
Belmont-sur-Lausanne has an area, as of 2009, of 2.65 square kilometres (1.02 mi^{2}). Of this area, 0.93 km^{2} (0.36 mi^{2}) or 35.1% is used for agricultural purposes, while 0.79 km^{2} (0.31 mi^{2}) or 29.8% is forested. Of the rest of the land, 0.88 km^{2} (0.34 mi^{2}) or 33.2% is settled (buildings or roads).

Of the built up area, housing and buildings made up 23.8% and transportation infrastructure made up 5.7%. Power and water infrastructure as well as other special developed areas made up 3.0% of the area Out of the forested land, 26.8% of the total land area is heavily forested and 3.0% is covered with orchards or small clusters of trees. Of the agricultural land, 15.8% is used for growing crops and 16.6% is pastures, while 2.6% is used for orchards or vine crops.

The municipality was part of the Lausanne District until it was dissolved on 31 August 2006, and Belmont-sur-Lausanne became part of the new district of Lavaux-Oron.

The municipality is located on a hill above Lake Geneva, east of the Paudèze valley. It consists of the village of Belmont-sur-Lausanne, the hamlet of Rochettaz and the ruins of the village of Les Chaffaises (grinding mill and sawmill).

== Coat of arms ==
The blazon of the municipal coat of arms is Gules, a triple mount Or, in chief Argent three May-beetles proper.

== Demographics ==
Belmont-sur-Lausanne has a population (as of December 2020) of 3,750. As of 2008, 23.9% of the population are resident foreign nationals. Over the last 10 years (1999–2009 ) the population has changed at a rate of 41.4%. It has changed at a rate of 29.1% due to migration and at a rate of 11.6% due to births and deaths.

Most of the population (as of 2000) speaks French (2,058 or 87.3%), with German being second most common (139 or 5.9%) and English being third (38 or 1.6%). There are 36 people who speak Italian and 1 person who speaks Romansh.

Of the population in the municipality 360 or about 15.3% were born in Belmont-sur-Lausanne and lived there in 2000. There were 934 or 39.6% who were born in the same canton, while 467 or 19.8% were born somewhere else in Switzerland, and 552 or 23.4% were born outside of Switzerland.

In 2008 there were 26 live births to Swiss citizens and 10 births to non-Swiss citizens, and in same time span there were 6 deaths of Swiss citizens and 2 non-Swiss citizen deaths. Ignoring immigration and emigration, the population of Swiss citizens increased by 20 while the foreign population increased by 8. There were 2 Swiss men who immigrated back to Switzerland and 2 Swiss women who emigrated from Switzerland. At the same time, there were 18 non-Swiss men and 16 non-Swiss women who immigrated from another country to Switzerland. The total Swiss population change in 2008 (from all sources, including moves across municipal borders) was a decrease of 16 and the non-Swiss population increased by 65 people. This represents a population growth rate of 1.5%.

The age distribution, as of 2009, in Belmont-sur-Lausanne is; 433 children or 13.1% of the population are between 0 and 9 years old and 464 teenagers or 14.1% are between 10 and 19. Of the adult population, 291 people or 8.8% of the population are between 20 and 29 years old. 444 people or 13.5% are between 30 and 39, 645 people or 19.6% are between 40 and 49, and 469 people or 14.2% are between 50 and 59. The senior population distribution is 336 people or 10.2% of the population are between 60 and 69 years old, 153 people or 4.6% are between 70 and 79, there are 51 people or 1.5% who are between 80 and 89, and there are 7 people or 0.2% who are 90 and older.

As of 2000, there were 951 people who were single and never married in the municipality. There were 1,190 married individuals, 68 widows or widowers and 149 individuals who are divorced.

As of 2000, there were 988 private households in the municipality, and an average of 2.4 persons per household. There were 284 households that consist of only one person and 54 households with five or more people. Out of a total of 1,010 households that answered this question, 28.1% were households made up of just one person and there were 4 adults who lived with their parents. Of the rest of the households, there are 311 married couples without children, 323 married couples with children There were 45 single parents with a child or children. There were 21 households that were made up of unrelated people and 22 households that were made up of some sort of institution or another collective housing.

In 2000 there were 374 single family homes (or 71.2% of the total) out of a total of 525 inhabited buildings. There were 111 multi-family buildings (21.1%), along with 32 multi-purpose buildings that were mostly used for housing (6.1%) and 8 other use buildings (commercial or industrial) that also had some housing (1.5%). Of the single family homes 35 were built before 1919, while 43 were built between 1990 and 2000. The greatest number of single family homes (105) were built between 1981 and 1990. The most multi-family homes (27) were built between 1971 and 1980 and the next most (24) were built between 1981 and 1990. There were 5 multi-family houses built between 1996 and 2000.

In 2000 there were 1,115 apartments in the municipality. The most common apartment size was 4 rooms of which there were 360. There were 42 single room apartments and 334 apartments with five or more rooms. Of these apartments, a total of 963 apartments (86.4% of the total) were permanently occupied, while 136 apartments (12.2%) were seasonally occupied and 16 apartments (1.4%) were empty. As of 2009, the construction rate of new housing units was 3.3 new units per 1000 residents. The vacancy rate for the municipality, in 2010, was 0.56%.

The historical population is given in the following chart:

== Politics ==
In the 2007 federal election the most popular party was the SP which received 20.75% of the vote. The next three most popular parties were the Green Party (16.7%), the SVP (16.58%) and the FDP (13.69%). In the federal election, a total of 916 votes were cast, and the voter turnout was 50.3%.

== Economy ==
As of 2010, Belmont-sur-Lausanne had an unemployment rate of 4.9%. As of 2008, there were 26 people employed in the primary economic sector and about 5 businesses involved in this sector. 55 people were employed in the secondary sector and there were 14 businesses in this sector. 311 people were employed in the tertiary sector, with 68 businesses in this sector. There were 1,276 residents of the municipality who were employed in some capacity, of which females made up 44.8% of the workforce.

In 2008 the total number of full-time equivalent jobs was 305. The number of jobs in the primary sector was 14, all of which were in agriculture. The number of jobs in the secondary sector was 48 of which 18 or (37.5%) were in manufacturing and 23 (47.9%) were in construction. The number of jobs in the tertiary sector was 243. In the tertiary sector; 52 or 21.4% were in wholesale or retail sales or the repair of motor vehicles, 20 or 8.2% were in the movement and storage of goods, 28 or 11.5% were in a hotel or restaurant, 9 or 3.7% were in the information industry, 7 or 2.9% were the insurance or financial industry, 26 or 10.7% were technical professionals or scientists, 4 or 1.6% were in education and 8 or 3.3% were in health care.

In 2000, there were 191 workers who commuted into the municipality and 1,081 workers who commuted away. The municipality is a net exporter of workers, with about 5.7 workers leaving the municipality for every one entering. Of the working population, 13% used public transportation to get to work, and 72.6% used a private car.

== Religion ==
From the 2000 census, 842 or 35.7% were Roman Catholic, while 905 or 38.4% belonged to the Swiss Reformed Church. Of the rest of the population, there were 19 members of an Orthodox church (or about 0.81% of the population), there were 4 individuals (or about 0.17% of the population) who belonged to the Christian Catholic Church, and there were 69 individuals (or about 2.93% of the population) who belonged to another Christian church. There were 19 individuals (or about 0.81% of the population) who were Jewish, and 27 (or about 1.15% of the population) who were Islamic. There were 7 individuals who were Buddhist, 3 individuals who were Hindu and 5 individuals who belonged to another church. 406 (or about 17.22% of the population) belonged to no church, are agnostic or atheist, and 82 individuals (or about 3.48% of the population) did not answer the question.

== Education ==
In Belmont-sur-Lausanne about 886 or (37.6%) of the population have completed non-mandatory upper secondary education, and 613 or (26.0%) have completed additional higher education (either university or a Fachhochschule). Of the 613 who completed tertiary schooling, 49.9% were Swiss men, 28.9% were Swiss women, 10.3% were non-Swiss men and 10.9% were non-Swiss women.

In the 2009/2010 school year there were a total of 442 students in the Belmont-sur-Lausanne school district. In the Vaud cantonal school system, two years of non-obligatory pre-school are provided by the political districts. During the school year, the political district provided pre-school care for a total of 665 children of which 232 children (34.9%) received subsidized pre-school care. The canton's primary school program requires students to attend for four years. There were 229 students in the municipal primary school program. The obligatory lower secondary school program lasts for six years and there were 211 students in those schools. There were also 2 students who were home schooled or attended another non-traditional school.

As of 2000, there were 129 students in Belmont-sur-Lausanne who came from another municipality, while 254 residents attended schools outside the municipality.
