= Jorat-Mézières =

- Municipality
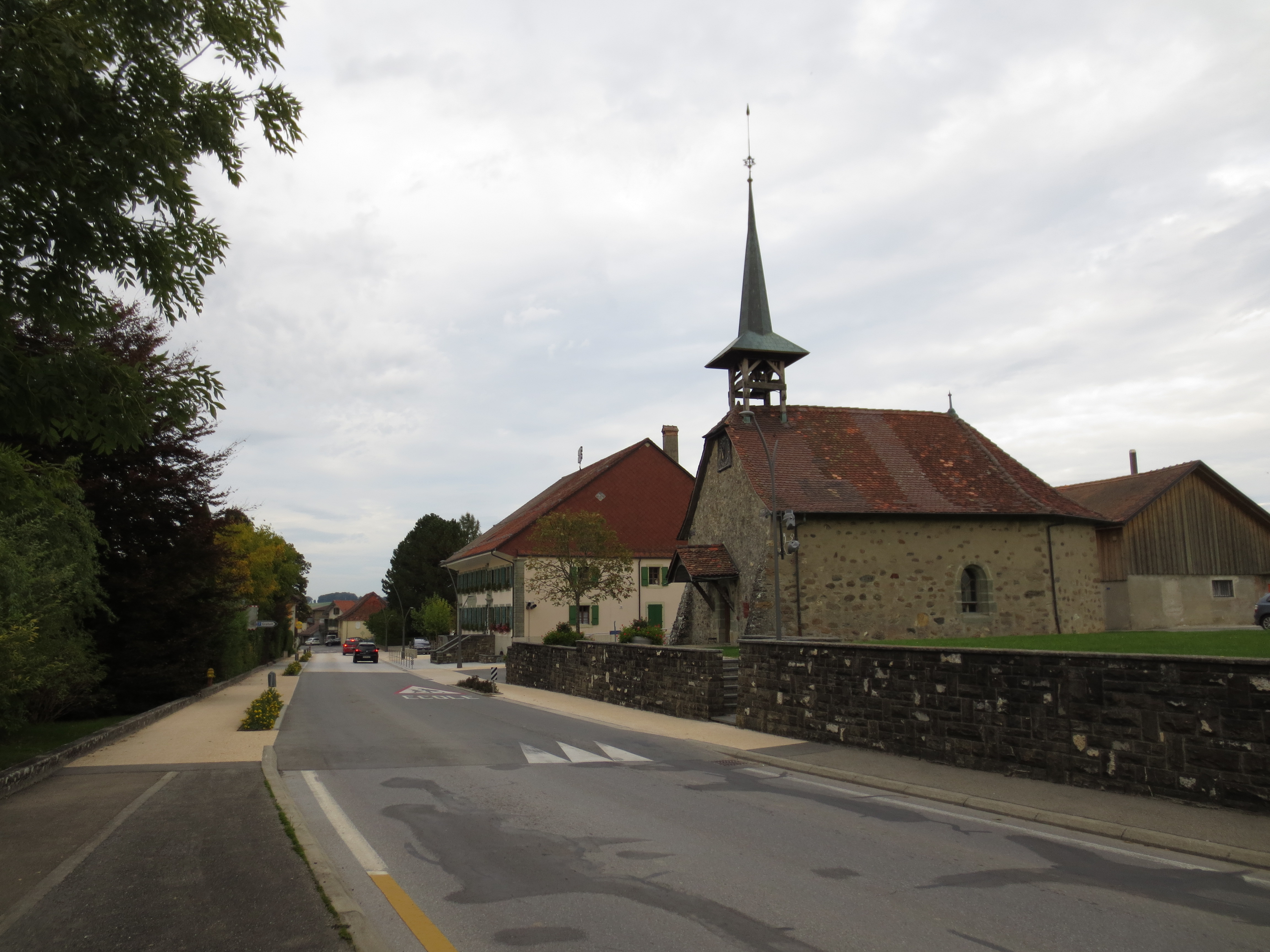
- Carrouge village, part of the municipality

- Flag Coat of arms
- Location of Jorat-Mézières
- Location within Switzerland Location within Canton of Vaud
- Coordinates: 46°36′N 06°46′E
- Country: Switzerland
- Canton: Vaud
- District: Lavaux-Oron

Government
  - Mayor: Syndic

Area
  - Total: 11.07 km^{2} (4.27 sq mi)
- Elevation: 750 m (2,460 ft)

Population (2014)
  - Total: 2,635
  - Density: 238.0/km^{2} (616.5/sq mi)
- Time zone: UTC+01:00 (CET)
  - Summer (DST): UTC+02:00 (CEST)
- Postal code: 1076, 1083-4
- SFOS number: 5806
- ISO 3166 code: CH-VD
- Surrounded by: Vucherens, Vulliens, Montpreveyres, Ropraz
- Website: http://www.jorat-mezieres.ch/ Profile (in French), SFSO statistics

Jorat-Mézières (French pronunciation: [ʒɔʁa mezjɛʁ]) is a municipality in the district of Lavaux-Oron in the canton of Vaud in Switzerland. On 1 July 2016 the former municipalities of Mézières (VD), Ferlens (VD) and Carrouge (VD) merged to form the new municipality of Jorat-Mézières.

== Geography ==
After the 2016 merger Jorat-Mézières had an area of 11.08 km^{2} (4.28 sq mi).

== Demographics ==
Jorat-Mézières has a population (as of December 2020) of 2,968.

== Historic Population ==
The historical population is given in the following chart:

== Heritage sites of national significance ==
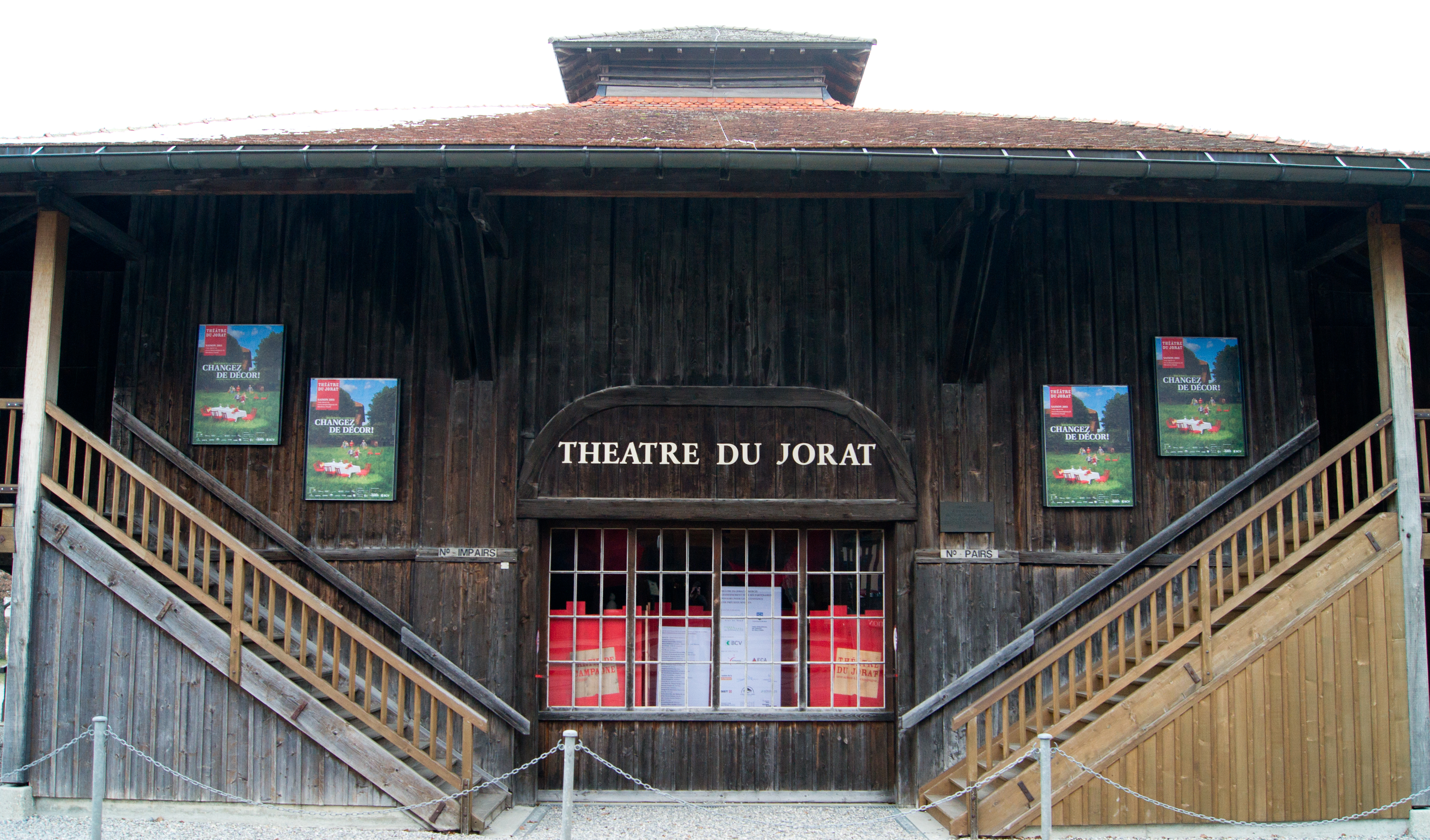
Thêatre du Jorat

The Théâtre Du Jorat is listed as a Swiss heritage site of national significance.
