= Jorat (Switzerland) =

Coordinates: 46°34′56″N 6°41′28″E

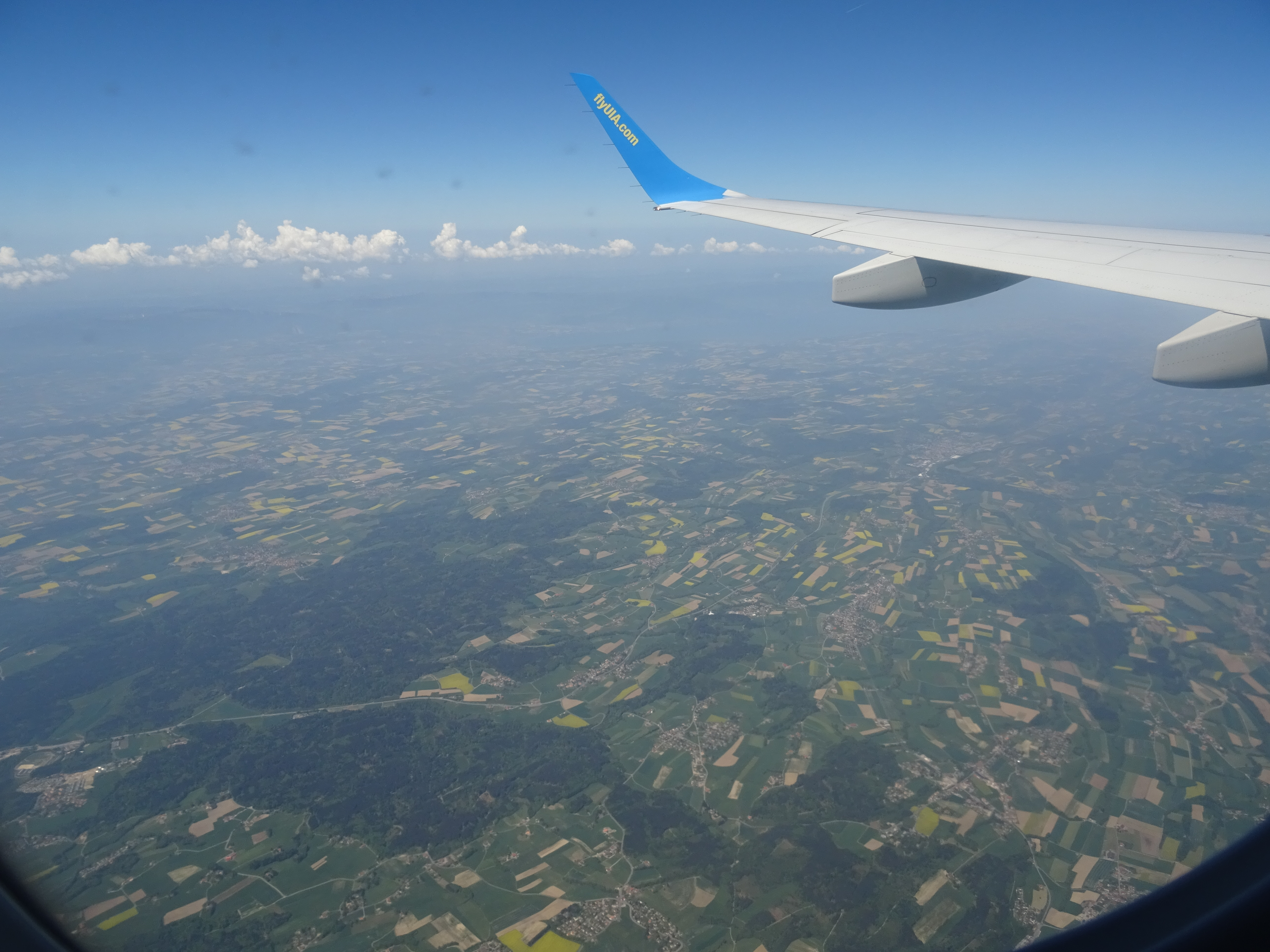
Aerial view of the Jorat.

The Jorat (German: "der Jurten") is the area of the Canton of Vaud (Switzerland) located between the Gros-de-Vaud, West and the Broye, East.

== Geography ==
It is a hill range that stretches from above Lausanne at the South and stretches toward Payerne at the North. Every stretch of land above 700 meters of altitude AMSL constitutes the mainly forest area called "Jorat". The culminating point is the Montagne du Château (929 meters).

== Villages ==
Strictly speaking, the Jorat comprises 18 villages, with a lot of agriculture :

- Carrouge,
- Corcelles-le-Jorat,
- Les Cullayes,
- Essertes,
- Ferlens,
- Froideville,
- Hermenches,
- Mézières,
- Montpreveyres,
- Peney-le-Jorat,
- Ropraz,
- Servion,
- Sottens,
- Syens,
- Villars-Mendraz,
- Villars-Tiercelin,
- Vucherens,
- Vulliens.

Stretching somewhat the definition, some 20 villages could be added to the above listing.

== See also ==
- Swiss Plateau
