= Carouge (disambiguation) =

Carouge may be:

- Carouge, the city in the Canton of Geneva, Switzerland
- Carouge (band)

== See also ==
- Carrouge, a municipality in the Canton of Vaud, Switzerland
