= Mézières, Vaud =

Mézières
- Former municipality
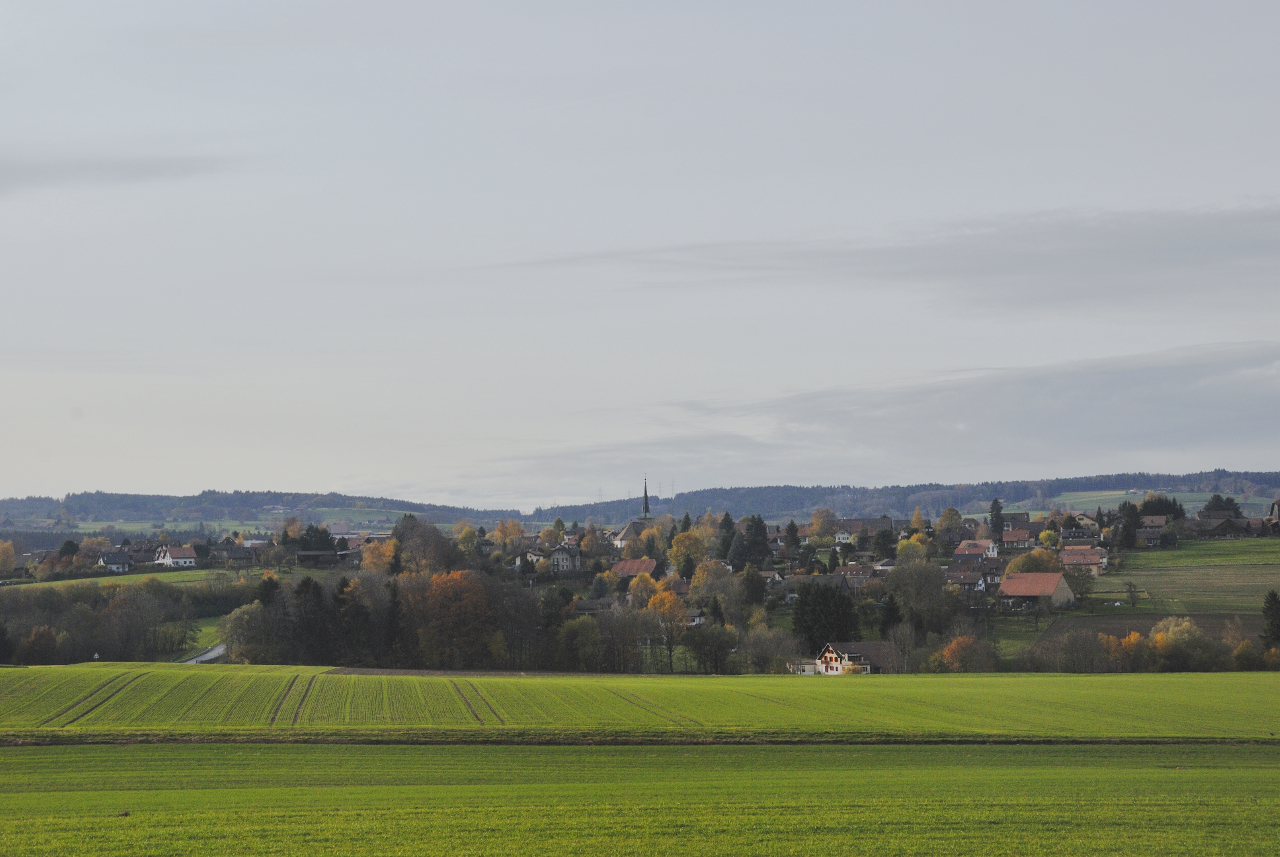
- Mézières village

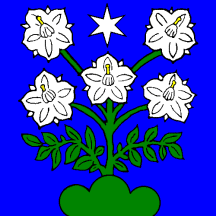
- Flag Coat of arms
- Location of Mézières
- Location within Switzerland Location within Canton of Vaud
- Coordinates: 46°36′N 06°46′E
- Country: Switzerland
- Canton: Vaud
- District: Lavaux-Oron

Government
  - Mayor: Syndic; Stéphane Saugy (as of January 2009)

Area
  - Total: 3.48 km^{2} (1.34 sq mi)
- Elevation: 750 m (2,460 ft)

Population (December 2007)
  - Total: 1,059
  - Density: 304/km^{2} (788/sq mi)
- Demonym(s): Les Méziérois; Les Grands Pantets
- Time zone: UTC+01:00 (CET)
  - Summer (DST): UTC+02:00 (CEST)
- Postal code: 1083
- SFOS number: 5791
- ISO 3166 code: CH-VD
- Surrounded by: Carrouge (VD), Ferlens (VD), Servion, Les Cullayes, Montpreveyres
- Website: www.jorat-mezieres.ch

Mézières (French pronunciation: [mezjɛʁ]) is a former municipality in the district of Lavaux-Oron in the canton of Vaud in Switzerland. On 1 July 2016, the former municipalities of Mézières, Carrouge, and Ferlens merged into the new municipality of Jorat-Mézières.

== History ==
Mézières is first mentioned in 1228 as Messeretes.

== Geography ==
Aerial view (1964)

Mézières has an area, as of 2009, of 3.5 square kilometers (1.4 mi^{2}). Of this area, 2.13 km^{2} (0.82 mi^{2}) or 61.2% is used for agricultural purposes, while 0.81 km^{2} (0.31 mi^{2}) or 23.3% is forested. Of the rest of the land, 0.56 km^{2} (0.22 mi^{2}) or 16.1% is settled (buildings or roads).

Of the built up area, housing and buildings made up 8.6% and transportation infrastructure made up 5.7%. Out of the forested land, 19.3% of the total land area is heavily forested and 4.0% is covered with orchards or small clusters of trees. Of the agricultural land, 38.2% is used for growing crops and 21.3% is pastures, while 1.7% is used for orchards or vine crops.

The municipality was part of the Oron District until it was dissolved on 31 August 2006, and Mézières became part of the new district of Lavaux-Oron.

The municipality is located in the Jorat region at the intersection of the Vevey-Moudon and Oron-Echallens roads. It consists of the large linear village of Mézières.

The municipalities of Carrouge, Ferlens and Mézières are considering a merger on at a date in the future into the new municipality with an, as of 2011, undetermined name.

== Coat of arms ==
The blazon of the municipal coat of arms is Azure, from a Coupeaux Vert rising a Potato Plant Vert flowered Argent and Or; in chief a Mullet of Six Argent.

== Demographics ==
As of December 2020, Mézières has a population of 1,216. As of 2008, 12.9% of the population are resident foreign nationals. Over the last 10 years (1999–2009 ) the population has changed at a rate of 10.6%. It has changed at a rate of 8.9% due to migration and at a rate of 2.4% due to births and deaths.

Most of the population (as of 2000) speaks French (888 or 91.6%), with German being second most common (42 or 4.3%) and Portuguese being third (11 or 1.1%). There are 8 people who speak Italian.

The age distribution, as of 2009, in Mézières is 135 children or 12.8% of the population are between 0 and 9 years old and 123 teenagers or 11.7% are between 10 and 19. Of the adult population, 110 people or 10.4% of the population are between 20 and 29 years old. 153 people or 14.5% are between 30 and 39, 153 people or 14.5% are between 40 and 49, and 149 people or 14.2% are between 50 and 59. The senior population distribution is 115 people or 10.9% of the population are between 60 and 69 years old, 64 people or 6.1% are between 70 and 79, there are 43 people or 4.1% who are between 80 and 89, and there are 8 people or 0.8% who are 90 and older.

As of 2000, there were 419 people who were single and never married in the municipality. There were 446 married individuals, 57 widows or widowers and 47 individuals who are divorced.

As of 2000, there were 375 private households in the municipality, and an average of 2.5 persons per household. There were 99 households that consist of only one person and 28 households with five or more people. Out of a total of 380 households that answered this question, 26.1% were households made up of just one person and there were 3 adults who lived with their parents. Of the rest of the households, there are 112 married couples without children and 125 married couples with children. There were 32 single parents with a child or children. There were 4 households that were made up of unrelated people and 5 households that were made up of some sort of institution or another collective housing.

In 2000 there were 137 single family homes (or 57.6% of the total) out of a total of 238 inhabited buildings. There were 48 multi-family buildings (20.2%), along with 39 multi-purpose buildings that were mostly used for housing (16.4%) and 14 other use buildings (commercial or industrial) that also had some housing (5.9%).

In 2000, a total of 361 apartments (88.0% of the total) were permanently occupied, while 39 apartments (9.5%) were seasonally occupied and 10 apartments (2.4%) were empty. As of 2009, the construction rate of new housing units was 3.8 new units per 1000 residents. The vacancy rate for the municipality, in 2010, was 2.42%.

The historical population is given in the following chart:

== Heritage sites of national significance ==
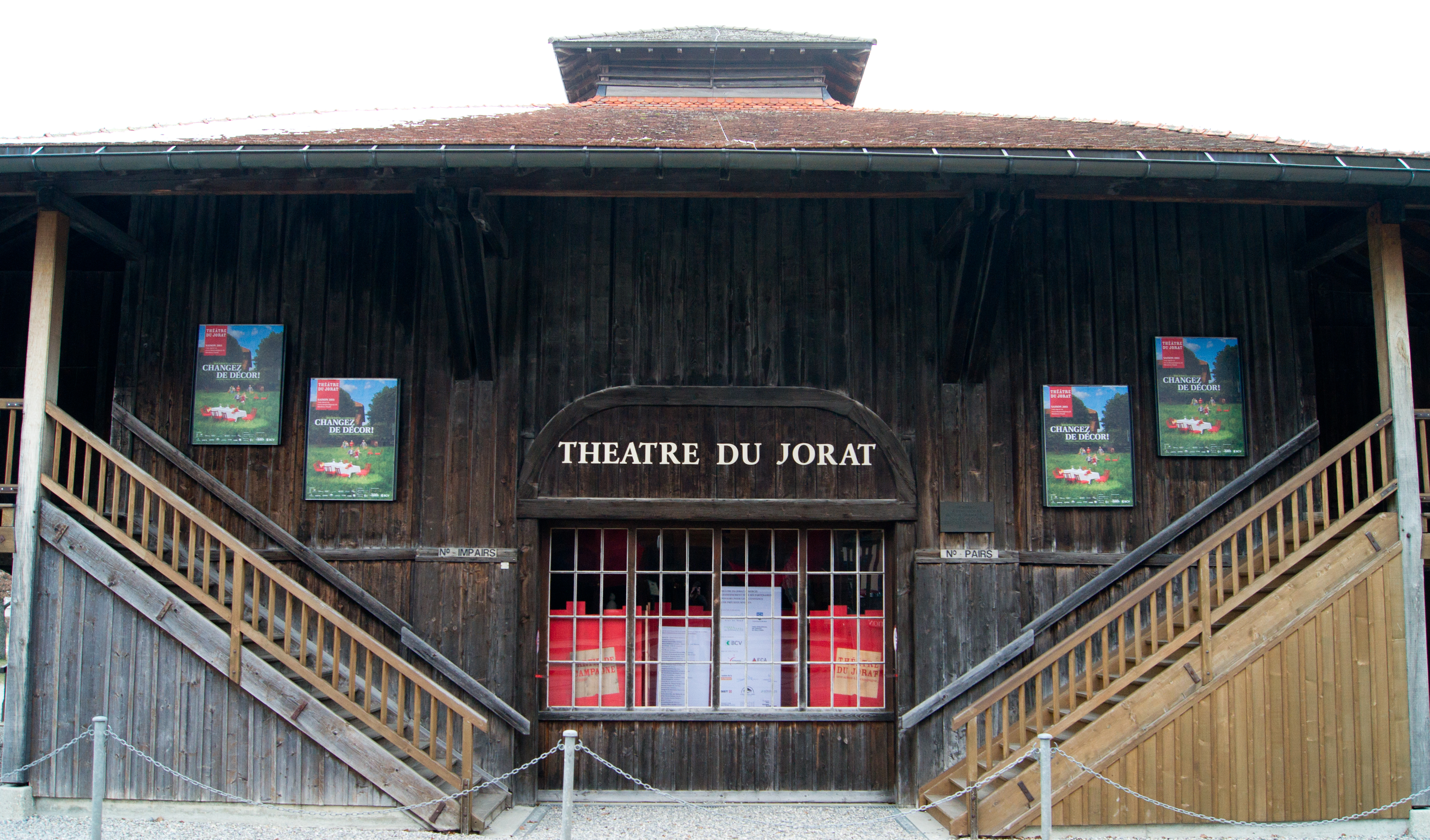
Thêatre du Jorat

The Théâtre du Jorat is listed as a Swiss heritage site of national significance.

== Politics ==
In the 2007 federal election the most popular party in Mézières was the SVP, which received 25.08% of the vote. The next three most popular parties were the SP (21.85%), the Green Party (17.3%) and the FDP (15.77%). In the federal election, a total of 336 votes were cast, and the voter turnout was 46.3%.

== Economy ==
As of 2010, Mézières had an unemployment rate of 2.7%. As of 2008, there were 26 people employed in the primary economic sector and about 8 businesses involved in this sector. 35 people were employed in the secondary sector and there were 11 businesses in this sector. 282 people were employed in the tertiary sector, with 59 businesses in this sector. There were 489 residents of the municipality who were employed in some capacity, of which females made up 45.4% of the workforce.

In 2008 the total number of full-time equivalent jobs was 266. The number of jobs in the primary sector was 24, of which 18 were in agriculture and 6 were in forestry or lumber production. The number of jobs in the secondary sector was 32 of which 9 or (28.1%) were in manufacturing and 23 (71.9%) were in construction. The number of jobs in the tertiary sector was 210. In the tertiary sector, 66 or 31.4% were in wholesale or retail sales or the repair of motor vehicles, 11 or 5.2% were in the movement and storage of goods, 13 or 6.2% were in a hotel or restaurant, 3 or 1.4% were in the information industry, 5 or 2.4% were the insurance or financial industry, 24 or 11.4% were technical professionals or scientists, 38 or 18.1% were in education and 38 or 18.1% were in health care.

In 2000, there were 206 workers who commuted into the municipality and 359 workers who commuted away. The municipality is a net exporter of workers, with about 1.7 workers leaving the municipality for every one entering. Of the working population, 10.8% used public transportation to get to work, and 68.1% used a private car.

== Religion ==
From the 2000 census, a majority of the town (507 or 52.3%) belonged to the Swiss Reformed Church, while 262 or 27.0% were Roman Catholic. Of the rest of the population, there were 5 members of an Orthodox church (or about 0.52% of the population), and there were 35 individuals (or about 3.61% of the population) who belonged to another Christian church. There were 4 individuals (or about 0.41% of the population) who were Jewish, and 11 (or about 1.14% of the population) who were Islamic. There were 3 individuals who belonged to another church. 130 (or about 13.42% of the population) belonged to no church, are agnostic or atheist, and 29 individuals (or about 2.99% of the population) did not answer the question.

== Education ==
In Mézières about 402 or (41.5%) of the population have completed non-mandatory upper secondary education, and 131 or (13.5%) have completed additional higher education (either university or a Fachhochschule). Of the 131 who completed tertiary schooling, 56.5% were Swiss men, 30.5% were Swiss women, 4.6% were non-Swiss men and 8.4% were non-Swiss women.

In the 2009/2010 school year there were a total of 138 students in the Mézières (VD) school district. In the Vaud cantonal school system, two years of non-obligatory pre-school are provided by the political districts. During the school year, the political district provided pre-school care for a total of 665 children of which 232 children (34.9%) received subsidized pre-school care. The canton's primary school program requires students to attend for four years. There were 75 students in the municipal primary school program. The obligatory lower secondary school program lasts for six years and there were 63 students in those schools.

As of 2000, there were 317 students in Mézières who came from another municipality, while 63 residents attended schools outside the municipality.
