= Servion =

- Municipality
- Flag Coat of arms
- Location of Servion
- Location within Switzerland Location within Canton of Vaud
- Coordinates: 46°34′N 06°47′E
- Country: Switzerland
- Canton: Vaud
- District: Lavaux-Oron

Government
  - Mayor: Gilbert Cuttelod

Area
  - Total: 4.20 km^{2} (1.62 sq mi)
- Elevation: 774 m (2,539 ft)

Population (2007)
  - Total: 1,062
  - Density: 253/km^{2} (655/sq mi)
- Demonym(s): Les Servionnais; Les Anes
- Time zone: UTC+01:00 (CET)
  - Summer (DST): UTC+02:00 (CEST)
- Postal code: 1077
- SFOS number: 5799
- ISO 3166 code: CH-VD
- Surrounded by: Ferlens (VD), Auboranges (FR), Essertes, Forel (Lavaux), Les Cullayes, Mézières (VD)
- Website: servion.ch

Servion (French pronunciation: [sɛʁvjɔ̃]) is a municipality in the district of Lavaux-Oron in the canton of Vaud in Switzerland. The municipality of Les Cullayes merged on 1 January 2012 into Servion.

== History ==
Servion is first mentioned in 1147 as Salvion and as Salviun.

== Geography ==
Servion has an area, as of 2009, of 4.2 square kilometers (1.6 mi^{2}). Of this area, 2.54 km^{2} (0.98 mi^{2}) or 60.3% is used for agricultural purposes, while 0.99 km^{2} (0.38 mi^{2}) or 23.5% is forested. Of the rest of the land, 0.67 km^{2} (0.26 mi^{2}) or 15.9% is settled (buildings or roads). After the merger the total area was 6.32 km^{2} (2.44 sq mi).

Of the built up area, industrial buildings made up 1.4% of the total area while housing and buildings made up 10.0% and transportation infrastructure made up 2.9%. while parks, green belts and sports fields made up 1.2%. Out of the forested land, 21.9% of the total land area is heavily forested and 1.7% is covered with orchards or small clusters of trees. Of the agricultural land, 41.3% is used for growing crops and 18.5% is pastures.

The municipality was part of the Oron District until it was dissolved on 31 August 2006, and Servion became part of the new district of Lavaux-Oron.

The municipality is located on the eastern bank of the Broye, in the eastern Jorat region.

Servion lies at an elevation of 752 m (2,467 ft), 3.5 km (2.2 mi) west of the district seat at Oron-la-Ville and 13 km (8.1 mi) northeast of Lausanne (as the crow flies). The scattered settlement stretches along the Carrouge brook on the eastern edge of the Jorat.

The area of the municipality includes a section of the sandstone hills between the Jorat and the Broye uplands. In the northeast are the Servion hills (rising to 782 m (2,566 ft)), and the eastern perimeter runs along the Parimbot, a tributary stream to the Broye. In the southeast, the municipality touches the Villars woods, where the highest point in the area is found at 855 m (2,805 ft). In the south, Servion borders on the hill of Pra Donnabbé (722 m (2,369 ft)).

Servion is surrounded by Essertes, Forel (Lavaux), Les Cullayes, Mézières, and Ferlens in the canton of Vaud and Auboranges in the canton of Fribourg.

== Coat of arms ==
The blazon of the municipal coat of arms is Vert, a Border Or, overall a Bend Gules.

== Demographics ==
Servion has a population (as of December 2020) of 2,078. As of 2008, 14.8% of the population are resident foreign nationals. Over the last 10 years (1999–2009) the population has changed at a rate of 8.2%. It has changed at a rate of 0.3% due to migration and at a rate of 8% due to births and deaths.

Most of the population (as of 2000) speaks French (878 or 89.7%), with German being second most common (39 or 4.0%) and Italian being third (20 or 2.0%).

The age distribution, as of 2009, in Servion is; 130 children or 12.1% of the population are between 0 and 9 years old and 164 teenagers or 15.3% are between 10 and 19. Of the adult population, 107 people or 10.0% of the population are between 20 and 29 years old. 147 people or 13.7% are between 30 and 39, 212 people or 19.8% are between 40 and 49, and 144 people or 13.4% are between 50 and 59. The senior population distribution is 112 people or 10.4% of the population are between 60 and 69 years old, 39 people or 3.6% are between 70 and 79, there are 16 people or 1.5% who are between 80 and 89, and there are 2 people or 0.2% who are 90 and older.

As of 2000, there were 427 people who were single and never married in the municipality. There were 484 married individuals, 22 widows or widowers and 46 individuals who are divorced.

As of 2000, there were 354 private households in the municipality, and an average of 2.7 persons per household. There were 76 households that consist of only one person and 35 households with five or more people. Out of a total of 361 households that answered this question, 21.1% were households made up of just one person and there were 2 adults who lived with their parents. Of the rest of the households, there are 102 married couples without children, 148 married couples with children. There were 21 single parents with a child or children. There were 5 households that were made up of unrelated people and 7 households that were made up of some sort of institution or another collective housing.

In 2000 there were 166 single family homes (or 68.0% of the total) out of a total of 244 inhabited buildings. There were 38 multi-family buildings (15.6%), along with 29 multi-purpose buildings that were mostly used for housing (11.9%) and 11 other use buildings (commercial or industrial) that also had some housing (4.5%).

In 2000, a total of 331 apartments (86.9% of the total) were permanently occupied, while 41 apartments (10.8%) were seasonally occupied and 9 apartments (2.4%) were empty. As of 2009, the construction rate of new housing units was 0 new units per 1000 residents. The vacancy rate for the municipality, in 2010, was 0.47%.

The historical population is given in the following chart:

== Tourism ==
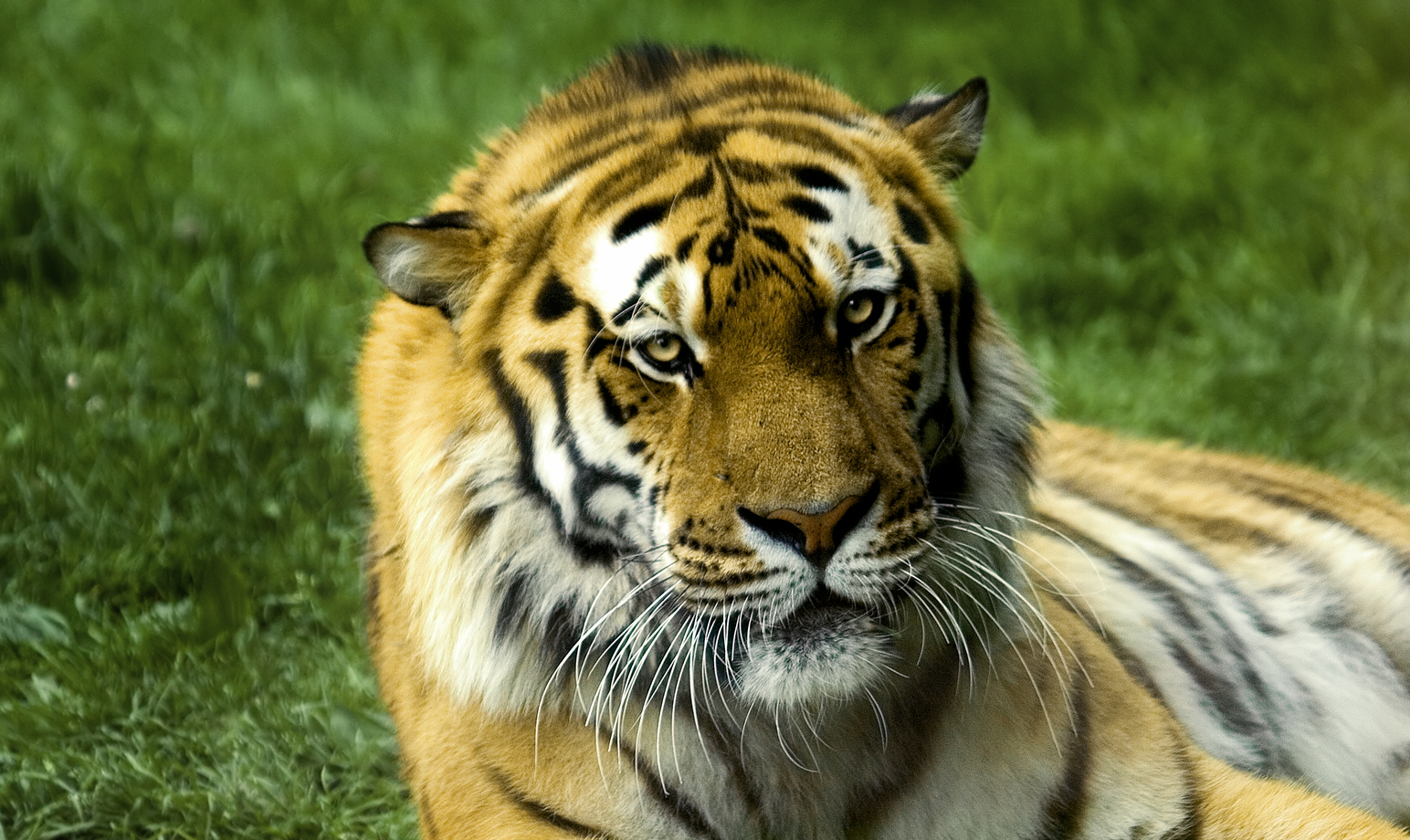
Tiger at the Servion zoo

Servion is known for its zoo, with a tropical aquarium, and the village theater Théâtre de Barnabé.

The village church dates from 1453, with a bell tower added in the 19th century.

== Politics ==
In the 2007 federal election the most popular party was the SVP which received 26.63% of the vote. The next three most popular parties were the SP (22.09%), the Green Party (14.87%) and the FDP (13.42%). In the federal election, a total of 280 votes were cast, and the voter turnout was 41.7%.

== Economy ==
Until the second half of the 20th century, Servion was primarily a farm village. Today, agriculture is only a minor occupation. Much additional employment has developed in sales and the service sector. In the commercial center that has developed on the Carrouge are found construction and transport firms, as well as electronics and precision instrument companies. Many new homes have been built, whose owners commute to Lausanne.

As of 2010, Servion had an unemployment rate of 2.6%. As of 2008, there were 9 people employed in the primary economic sector and about 4 businesses involved in this sector. 45 people were employed in the secondary sector and there were 12 businesses in this sector. 181 people were employed in the tertiary sector, with 46 businesses in this sector. There were 530 residents of the municipality who were employed in some capacity, of which females made up 44.5% of the workforce.

In 2008 the total number of full-time equivalent jobs was 198. The number of jobs in the primary sector was 7, all of which were in agriculture. The number of jobs in the secondary sector was 42 of which 17 or (40.5%) were in manufacturing and 25 (59.5%) were in construction. The number of jobs in the tertiary sector was 149. In the tertiary sector; 64 or 43.0% were in wholesale or retail sales or the repair of motor vehicles, 4 or 2.7% were in the movement and storage of goods, 18 or 12.1% were in a hotel or restaurant, 8 or 5.4% were the insurance or financial industry, 15 or 10.1% were technical professionals or scientists, 6 or 4.0% were in education and 1 was in health care.

In 2000, there were 151 workers who commuted into the municipality and 426 workers who commuted away. The municipality is a net exporter of workers, with about 2.8 workers leaving the municipality for every one entering. Of the working population, 10.4% used public transportation to get to work, and 73.8% used a private car.

== Religion ==
From the 2000 census, 314 or 32.1% were Roman Catholic, while 450 or 46.0% belonged to the Swiss Reformed Church. Of the rest of the population, there were 4 members of an Orthodox church (or about 0.41% of the population), and there were 20 individuals (or about 2.04% of the population) who belonged to another Christian church. There was 1 individual who was Jewish, and 11 (or about 1.12% of the population) who were Islamic. There were 2 individuals who were Buddhist and 1 individual who belonged to another church. 155 (or about 15.83% of the population) belonged to no church, are agnostic or atheist, and 28 individuals (or about 2.86% of the population) did not answer the question.

== Education ==
In Servion about 380 or (38.8%) of the population have completed non-mandatory upper secondary education, and 165 or (16.9%) have completed additional higher education (either university or a Fachhochschule). Of the 165 who completed tertiary schooling, 50.3% were Swiss men, 32.1% were Swiss women, 12.7% were non-Swiss men and 4.8% were non-Swiss women.

In the 2009/2010 school year there were a total of 151 students in the Servion school district. In the Vaud cantonal school system, two years of non-obligatory pre-school are provided by the political districts. During the school year, the political district provided pre-school care for a total of 665 children of which 232 children (34.9%) received subsidized pre-school care. The canton's primary school program requires students to attend for four years. There were 69 students in the municipal primary school program. The obligatory lower secondary school program lasts for six years and there were 82 students in those schools.

As of 2000, there were 14 students in Servion who came from another municipality, while 137 residents attended schools outside the municipality.
