= Ferlens =

- Former municipality
- Flag Coat of arms
- Location of Ferlens
- Location within Switzerland Location within Canton of Vaud
- Coordinates: 46°35.4′N 6°47.0333′E
- Country: Switzerland
- Canton: Vaud
- District: Lavaux-Oron

Government
  - Mayor: Syndic; André Delessert

Area
  - Total: 2.18 km^{2} (0.84 sq mi)
- Elevation: 747 m (2,451 ft)

Population (2004)
  - Total: 284
  - Density: 130/km^{2} (337/sq mi)
- Demonym(s): Les Ferlanais; Lè z'Etserpenâ
- Time zone: UTC+01:00 (CET)
  - Summer (DST): UTC+02:00 (CEST)
- Postal code: 1076
- SFOS number: 5789
- ISO 3166 code: CH-VD
- Surrounded by: Carrouge (VD), Vulliens, Ecublens (FR), Auboranges (FR), Servion, Mézières (VD)
- Website: www.jorat-mezieres.ch

Ferlens is a former municipality in the district of Lavaux-Oron in the canton of Vaud in Switzerland. On 1 July 2016 the former municipalities of Ferlens, Carrouge and Mézières merged into the new municipality of Jorat-Mézières.

== History ==
Ferlens is first mentioned around 1147-50 as Ferlens.

== Geography ==
Ferlens has an area, as of 2009, of 2.2 square kilometers (0.85 mi^{2}). Of this area, 1.51 km^{2} (0.58 mi^{2}) or 69.6% is used for agricultural purposes, while 0.49 km^{2} (0.19 mi^{2}) or 22.6% is forested. Of the rest of the land, 0.16 km^{2} (0.062 mi^{2}) or 7.4% is settled (buildings or roads).

Of the built up area, housing and buildings made up 3.7% and transportation infrastructure made up 3.2%. Out of the forested land, all of the forested land area is covered with heavy forests. Of the agricultural land, 46.5% is used for growing crops and 21.2% is pastures, while 1.8% is used for orchards or vine crops.

The municipality was part of the Oron District until it was dissolved on 31 August 2006, and Ferlens became part of the new district of Lavaux-Oron.

The municipality is located in the Jorat region, on the left bank of the Broye. The eastern border of the municipality is the Canton of Fribourg.

The municipalities of Carrouge, Ferlens and Mézières are considering a merger on at a date in the future into the new municipality with an, as of 2011, undetermined name.

== Coat of arms ==
The blazon of the municipal coat of arms is Vert, bordered Or, an Arrow point bendwise Argent.

== Demographics ==
Ferlens has a population (as of December 2020) of 335. As of 2008, 4.4% of the population are resident foreign nationals. Over the last 10 years (1999–2009) the population has changed at a rate of 21.7%. It has changed at a rate of 20.2% due to migration and at a rate of 1.1% due to births and deaths.

Most of the population (as of 2000) speaks French (244 or 92.1%), with German being second most common (17 or 6.4%) and Italian being third (4 or 1.5%).

The age distribution, as of 2009, in Ferlens is; 39 children or 12.0% of the population are between 0 and 9 years old and 51 teenagers or 15.7% are between 10 and 19. Of the adult population, 25 people or 7.7% of the population are between 20 and 29 years old. 41 people or 12.6% are between 30 and 39, 59 people or 18.2% are between 40 and 49, and 45 people or 13.8% are between 50 and 59. The senior population distribution is 40 people or 12.3% of the population are between 60 and 69 years old, 17 people or 5.2% are between 70 and 79, there are 7 people or 2.2% who are between 80 and 89, and there is 1 person who is 90 and older.

As of 2000, there were 107 people who were single and never married in the municipality. There were 138 married individuals, 10 widows or widowers and 10 individuals who are divorced.

As of 2000, there were 109 private households in the municipality, and an average of 2.4 persons per household. There were 31 households that consist of only one person and 11 households with five or more people. Out of a total of 111 households that answered this question, 27.9% were households made up of just one person. Of the rest of the households, there are 35 married couples without children, 34 married couples with children There were 7 single parents with a child or children. There were 2 households that were made up of unrelated people and 2 households that were made up of some sort of institution or another collective housing.

In 2000 there were 48 single family homes (or 60.0% of the total) out of a total of 80 inhabited buildings. There were 12 multi-family buildings (15.0%), along with 17 multi-purpose buildings that were mostly used for housing (21.3%) and 3 other use buildings (commercial or industrial) that also had some housing (3.8%).

In 2000, a total of 102 apartments (91.9% of the total) were permanently occupied, while 9 apartments (8.1%) were seasonally occupied. As of 2009, the construction rate of new housing units was 9.2 new units per 1000 residents. The vacancy rate for the municipality, in 2010, was 0%.

The historical population is given in the following chart:

== Politics ==
In the 2007 federal election the most popular party was the SVP which received 23.88% of the vote. The next three most popular parties were the Green Party (22.72%), the SP (18.32%) and the FDP (16.86%). In the federal election, a total of 114 votes were cast, and the voter turnout was 54.0%.

== Economy ==
As of 2010, Ferlens had an unemployment rate of 1.6%. As of 2008, there were 16 people employed in the primary economic sector and about 7 businesses involved in this sector. 4 people were employed in the secondary sector and there were 2 businesses in this sector. 16 people were employed in the tertiary sector, with 5 businesses in this sector. There were 142 residents of the municipality who were employed in some capacity, of which females made up 45.1% of the workforce.

In 2008 the total number of full-time equivalent jobs was 23. The number of jobs in the primary sector was 11, all of which were in agriculture. The number of jobs in the secondary sector was 3, all of which were in construction. The number of jobs in the tertiary sector was 9. In the tertiary sector; 1 was in the sale or repair of motor vehicles, 3 or 33.3% were in a hotel or restaurant, 1 was a technical professional or scientist, 1 was in education.

In 2000, there were 5 workers who commuted into the municipality and 102 workers who commuted away. The municipality is a net exporter of workers, with about 20.4 workers leaving the municipality for every one entering. Of the working population, 7.7% used public transportation to get to work, and 66.9% used a private car.

== Religion ==
From the 2000 census, 44 or 16.6% were Roman Catholic, while 148 or 55.8% belonged to the Swiss Reformed Church. Of the rest of the population, there was 1 member of an Orthodox church, and there were 34 individuals (or about 12.83% of the population) who belonged to another Christian church. There were 1 individual who belonged to another church. 52 (or about 19.62% of the population) belonged to no church, are agnostic or atheist, and 2 individuals (or about 0.75% of the population) did not answer the question.

== Education ==
In Ferlens about 93 or (35.1%) of the population have completed non-mandatory upper secondary education, and 47 or (17.7%) have completed additional higher education (either university or a Fachhochschule). Of the 47 who completed tertiary schooling, 59.6% were Swiss men, 36.2% were Swiss women.

In the 2009/2010 school year there were a total of 42 students in the Ferlens school district. In the Vaud cantonal school system, two years of non-obligatory pre-school are provided by the political districts. During the school year, the political district provided pre-school care for a total of 665 children of which 232 children (34.9%) received subsidized pre-school care. The canton's primary school program requires students to attend for four years. There were 21 students in the municipal primary school program. The obligatory lower secondary school program lasts for six years and there were 21 students in those schools.

As of 2000, there were 14 students in Ferlens who came from another municipality, while 41 residents attended schools outside the municipality.
