= Montpreveyres =

- Municipality
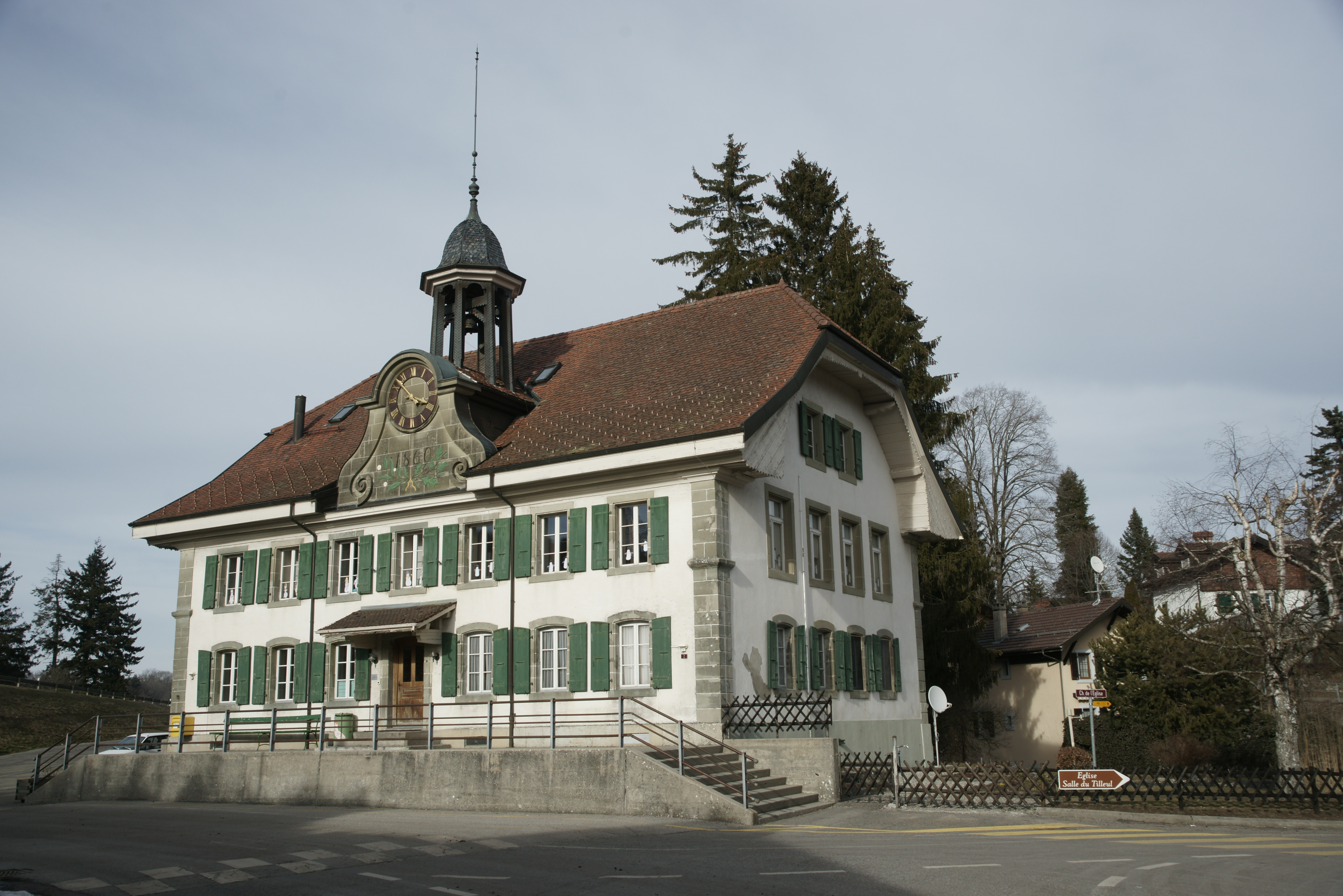

- Flag Coat of arms
- Location of Montpreveyres
- Location within Switzerland Location within Canton of Vaud
- Coordinates: 46°35′N 06°44′E
- Country: Switzerland
- Canton: Vaud
- District: Lavaux-Oron

Government
  - Mayor: Syndic; Sylvie Robert-Progin

Area
  - Total: 4.11 km^{2} (1.59 sq mi)
- Elevation: 797 m (2,615 ft)

Population (2004)
  - Total: 458
  - Density: 111/km^{2} (289/sq mi)
- Demonym: Les Rossignolets
- Time zone: UTC+01:00 (CET)
  - Summer (DST): UTC+02:00 (CEST)
- Postal code: 1081, 1099
- SFOS number: 5792
- ISO 3166 code: CH-VD
- Surrounded by: Corcelles-le-Jorat, Ropraz, Carrouge (VD), Mézières (VD), Les Cullayes, Savigny, Lausanne, Froideville
- Website: www.montpreveyres.ch

Montpreveyres is a municipality in the district of Lavaux-Oron in the canton of Vaud in Switzerland.

== History ==
Montpreveyres is first mentioned in 1154 as Monteproverio. In 1177 it was mentioned as Montpreuero. Then in 1167 and again in 1228 it was called Mons Presbiteri.

== Geography ==
Montpreveyres has an area, as of 2009, of 4.1 square kilometers (1.6 mi^{2}). Of this area, 1.67 km^{2} (0.64 mi^{2}) or 40.7% is used for agricultural purposes, while 2.05 km^{2} (0.79 mi^{2}) or 50.0% is forested. Of the rest of the land, 0.38 km^{2} (0.15 mi^{2}) or 9.3% is settled (buildings or roads) and 0.01 km^{2} (2.5 acres) or 0.2% is unproductive land.

Of the built up area, housing and buildings made up 5.9% and transportation infrastructure made up 2.7%. Out of the forested land, all of the forested land area is covered with heavy forests. Of the agricultural land, 20.0% is used for growing crops and 19.0% is pastures, while 1.7% is used for orchards or vine crops.

The municipality was part of the Oron District until it was dissolved on 31 August 2006, and Montpreveyres became part of the new district of Lavaux-Oron.

The municipality is located on the eastern slopes of the Haut-Jorat region.

== Coat of arms ==
The blazon of the municipal coat of arms is Azure, on two Hills as many Columns Argent, in chief Argent on a Branch Vert statant a Nightingale proper.

== Demographics ==
Montpreveyres has a population (as of December 2020) of 653. As of 2008, 19.6% of the population are resident foreign nationals. Over the last 10 years (1999–2009 ) the population has changed at a rate of 54.3%. It has changed at a rate of 42.5% due to migration and at a rate of 10.7% due to births and deaths.

Most of the population (as of 2000) speaks French (355 or 95.2%), with German being second most common (9 or 2.4%) and Albanian being third (4 or 1.1%).

The age distribution, as of 2009, in Montpreveyres is; 85 children or 15.9% of the population are between 0 and 9 years old and 68 teenagers or 12.7% are between 10 and 19. Of the adult population, 60 people or 11.2% of the population are between 20 and 29 years old. 91 people or 17.0% are between 30 and 39, 108 people or 20.2% are between 40 and 49, and 51 people or 9.6% are between 50 and 59. The senior population distribution is 31 people or 5.8% of the population are between 60 and 69 years old, 30 people or 5.6% are between 70 and 79, there are 9 people or 1.7% who are between 80 and 89, and there is 1 person who is 90 and older.

As of 2000, there were 158 people who were single and never married in the municipality. There were 185 married individuals, 17 widows or widowers and 13 individuals who are divorced.

As of 2000, there were 156 private households in the municipality, and an average of 2.4 persons per household. There were 49 households that consist of only one person and 10 households with five or more people. Out of a total of 158 households that answered this question, 31.0% were households made up of just one person and there was 1 adult who lived with their parents. Of the rest of the households, there are 42 married couples without children, 54 married couples with children There were 6 single parents with a child or children. There were 4 households that were made up of unrelated people and 2 households that were made up of some sort of institution or another collective housing.

In 2000 there were 65 single family homes (or 58.6% of the total) out of a total of 111 inhabited buildings. There were 19 multi-family buildings (17.1%), along with 22 multi-purpose buildings that were mostly used for housing (19.8%) and 5 other use buildings (commercial or industrial) that also had some housing (4.5%).

In 2000, a total of 153 apartments (92.7% of the total) were permanently occupied, while 7 apartments (4.2%) were seasonally occupied and 5 apartments (3.0%) were empty. As of 2009, the construction rate of new housing units was 0 new units per 1000 residents. The vacancy rate for the municipality, in 2010, was 0%.

The historical population is given in the following chart:

== Politics ==
In the 2007 federal election the most popular party was the SP which received 23.54% of the vote. The next three most popular parties were the Green Party (23.49%), the SVP (15.71%) and the CVP (9.94%). In the federal election, a total of 137 votes were cast, and the voter turnout was 44.3%.

== Economy ==
As of 2010, Montpreveyres had an unemployment rate of 3.5%. As of 2008, there were 7 people employed in the primary economic sector and about 3 businesses involved in this sector. 15 people were employed in the secondary sector and there were 3 businesses in this sector. 59 people were employed in the tertiary sector, with 15 businesses in this sector. There were 196 residents of the municipality who were employed in some capacity, of which females made up 39.8% of the workforce.

In 2008 the total number of full-time equivalent jobs was 64. The number of jobs in the primary sector was 6, all of which were in agriculture. The number of jobs in the secondary sector was 13 of which 2 or (15.4%) were in manufacturing and 11 (84.6%) were in construction. The number of jobs in the tertiary sector was 45. In the tertiary sector; 19 or 42.2% were in wholesale or retail sales or the repair of motor vehicles, 7 or 15.6% were in a hotel or restaurant, 3 or 6.7% were technical professionals or scientists, 3 or 6.7% were in education and 1 was in health care.

In 2000, there were 130 workers who commuted into the municipality and 152 workers who commuted away. The municipality is a net exporter of workers, with about 1.2 workers leaving the municipality for every one entering. Of the working population, 14.8% used public transportation to get to work, and 67.3% used a private car.

== Religion ==
From the 2000 census, 83 or 22.3% were Roman Catholic, while 214 or 57.4% belonged to the Swiss Reformed Church. Of the rest of the population, there was 1 member of an Orthodox church, and there were 16 individuals (or about 4.29% of the population) who belonged to another Christian church. There were 7 (or about 1.88% of the population) who were Islamic. There were 2 individuals who were Buddhist and 1 individual who belonged to another church. 45 (or about 12.06% of the population) belonged to no church, are agnostic or atheist, and 12 individuals (or about 3.22% of the population) did not answer the question.

== Education ==
In Montpreveyres about 131 or (35.1%) of the population have completed non-mandatory upper secondary education, and 71 or (19.0%) have completed additional higher education (either university or a Fachhochschule). Of the 71 who completed tertiary schooling, 56.3% were Swiss men, 33.8% were Swiss women and 7.0% were non-Swiss women.

In the 2009/2010 school year there were a total of 86 students in the Montpreveyres school district. In the Vaud cantonal school system, two years of non-obligatory pre-school are provided by the political districts. During the school year, the political district provided pre-school care for a total of 665 children of which 232 children (34.9%) received subsidized pre-school care. The canton's primary school program requires students to attend for four years. There were 52 students in the municipal primary school program. The obligatory lower secondary school program lasts for six years and there were 34 students in those schools.

As of 2000, there were 18 students in Montpreveyres who came from another municipality, while 48 residents attended schools outside the municipality.
