= Vulliens =

- Municipality
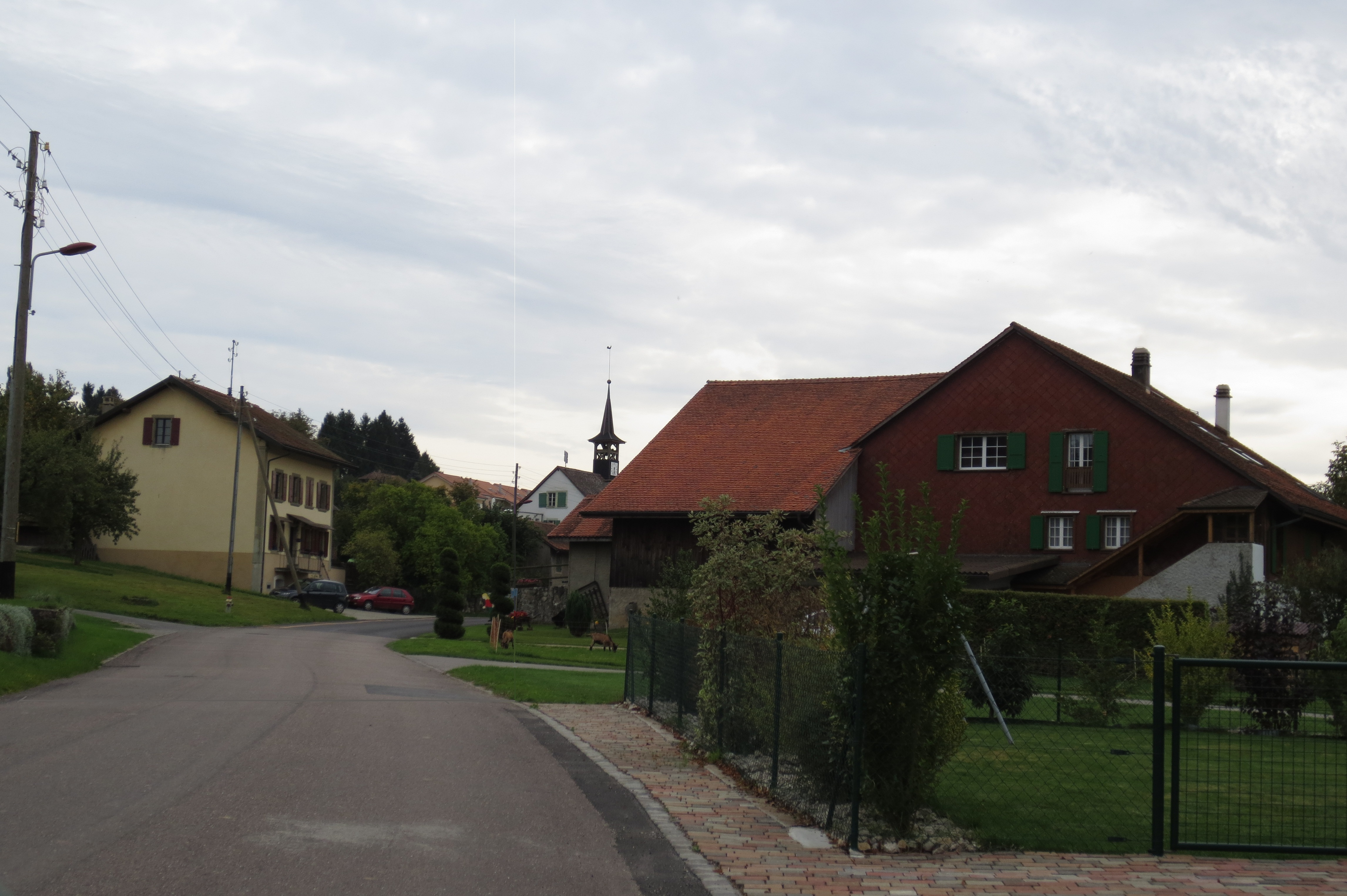

- Flag Coat of arms
- Location of Vulliens
- Location within Switzerland Location within Canton of Vaud
- Coordinates: 46°37′N 6°48′E
- Country: Switzerland
- Canton: Vaud
- District: Broye-Vully

Government
  - Mayor: Daniel Schorderet (Syndic)

Area
  - Total: 6.64 km^{2} (2.56 sq mi)
- Elevation: 708 m (2,323 ft)

Population (2003)
  - Total: 437
  - Density: 65.8/km^{2} (170/sq mi)
- Time zone: UTC+01:00 (CET)
  - Summer (DST): UTC+02:00 (CEST)
- Postal code: 1085
- SFOS number: 5803
- ISO 3166 code: CH-VD
- Surrounded by: Carrouge, Chavannes-sur-Moudon, Ecublens (FR), Ferlens, Montet (Glâne) (FR), Moudon, Syens, Vucherens
- Website: vulliens.ch

Vulliens is a municipality in the district of Broye-Vully in the canton of Vaud in Switzerland. The municipality has a mayor with Daniel Schorderet since 2002 and four municipal councillors.

== Geography ==
Vulliens has an area, as of 2009, of 6.6 square kilometers (2.5 mi^{2}). Of this area, 4.46 km^{2} (1.72 mi^{2}) or 67.3% is used for agricultural purposes, while 1.81 km^{2} (0.70 mi^{2}) or 27.3% is forested. Of the rest of the land, 0.36 km^{2} (0.14 mi^{2}) or 5.4% is settled (buildings or roads), 0.07 km^{2} (17 acres) or 1.1% is either rivers or lakes.

Of the built up area, housing and buildings made up 2.1% and transportation infrastructure made up 3.3%. Out of the forested land, 26.2% of the total land area is heavily forested and 1.1% is covered with orchards or small clusters of trees. Of the agricultural land, 49.8% is used for growing crops and 15.7% is pastures, while 1.8% is used for orchards or vine crops. All the water in the municipality is flowing water.

The municipality was part of the Oron District until it was dissolved on 31 August 2006, and Vulliens became part of the new district of Broye-Vully.

== Coat of arms ==
The blazon of the municipal coat of arms is Gules, a Bar Or between three Roses of the same two and one.

== Demographics ==
Vulliens has a population (as of December 2020) of 625. As of 2008, 5.3% of the population are resident foreign nationals. Over the last 10 years (1999–2009 ) the population has changed at a rate of 5.1%. It has changed at a rate of -1% due to migration and at a rate of 6.3% due to births and deaths.

Most of the population (as of 2000) speaks French (414 or 94.5%), with German being second most common (15 or 3.4%) and Italian being third (2 or 0.5%).

The age distribution, as of 2009, in Vulliens is; 60 children or 13.8% of the population are between 0 and 9 years old and 68 teenagers or 15.6% are between 10 and 19. Of the adult population, 44 people or 10.1% of the population are between 20 and 29 years old. 44 people or 10.1% are between 30 and 39, 65 people or 14.9% are between 40 and 49, and 70 people or 16.1% are between 50 and 59. The senior population distribution is 37 people or 8.5% of the population are between 60 and 69 years old, 22 people or 5.0% are between 70 and 79, there are 25 people or 5.7% who are between 80 and 89, and there is 1 person who is 90 and older.

As of 2000, there were 189 people who were single and never married in the municipality. There were 214 married individuals, 21 widows or widowers and 14 individuals who are divorced.

As of 2000, there were 151 private households in the municipality, and an average of 2.9 persons per household. There were 30 households that consist of only one person and 20 households with five or more people. Out of a total of 156 households that answered this question, 19.2% were households made up of just one person and there were 3 adults who lived with their parents. Of the rest of the households, there are 39 married couples without children, 72 married couples with children There were 5 single parents with a child or children. There were 2 households that were made up of unrelated people and 5 households that were made up of some sort of institution or another collective housing.

In 2000 there were 70 single family homes (or 55.6% of the total) out of a total of 126 inhabited buildings. There were 17 multi-family buildings (13.5%), along with 38 multi-purpose buildings that were mostly used for housing (30.2%) and 1 other use buildings (commercial or industrial) that also had some housing (0.8%).

In 2000, a total of 144 apartments (88.3% of the total) were permanently occupied, while 14 apartments (8.6%) were seasonally occupied and 5 apartments (3.1%) were empty. As of 2009, the construction rate of new housing units was 6.9 new units per 1000 residents. The vacancy rate for the municipality, in 2010, was 1.12%.

The historical population is given in the following chart:

== Politics ==
In the 2007 federal election the most popular party was the SVP which received 38.91% of the vote. The next three most popular parties were the SP (15.66%), the FDP (15.63%) and the Green Party (12.54%). In the federal election, a total of 158 votes were cast, and the voter turnout was 51.3%.

== Economy ==
As of 2010, Vulliens had an unemployment rate of 2.5%. As of 2008, there were 39 people employed in the primary economic sector and about 19 businesses involved in this sector. 12 people were employed in the secondary sector and there were 5 businesses in this sector. 22 people were employed in the tertiary sector, with 10 businesses in this sector. There were 213 residents of the municipality who were employed in some capacity, of which females made up 42.3% of the workforce.

In 2008 the total number of full-time equivalent jobs was 50. The number of jobs in the primary sector was 29, all of which were in agriculture. The number of jobs in the secondary sector was 7 of which 1 was in manufacturing and 6 (85.7%) were in construction. The number of jobs in the tertiary sector was 14. In the tertiary sector; 7 or 50.0% were in wholesale or retail sales or the repair of motor vehicles, 1 was in the movement and storage of goods, 1 was in the information industry, 1 was in education.

In 2000, there were 13 workers who commuted into the municipality and 139 workers who commuted away. The municipality is a net exporter of workers, with about 10.7 workers leaving the municipality for every one entering. Of the working population, 5.6% used public transportation to get to work, and 61% used a private car.

== Religion ==
From the 2000 census, 54 or 12.3% were Roman Catholic, while 278 or 63.5% belonged to the Swiss Reformed Church. Of the rest of the population, there were 7 individuals (or about 1.60% of the population) who belonged to the Christian Catholic Church, and there were 14 individuals (or about 3.20% of the population) who belonged to another Christian church. There were 16 (or about 3.65% of the population) who were Islamic. 50 (or about 11.42% of the population) belonged to no church, are agnostic or atheist, and 25 individuals (or about 5.71% of the population) did not answer the question.

== Education ==
In Vulliens about 136 or (31.1%) of the population have completed non-mandatory upper secondary education, and 59 or (13.5%) have completed additional higher education (either university or a Fachhochschule). Of the 59 who completed tertiary schooling, 71.2% were Swiss men, 25.4% were Swiss women.

In the 2009/2010 school year there were a total of 62 students in the Vulliens school district. In the Vaud cantonal school system, two years of non-obligatory pre-school are provided by the political districts. During the school year, the political district provided pre-school care for a total of 155 children of which 83 children (53.5%) received subsidized pre-school care. The canton's primary school program requires students to attend for four years. There were 30 students in the municipal primary school program. The obligatory lower secondary school program lasts for six years and there were 32 students in those schools.

As of 2000, there were 8 students in Vulliens who came from another municipality, while 79 residents attended schools outside the municipality.
