= Vucherens =

- Municipality
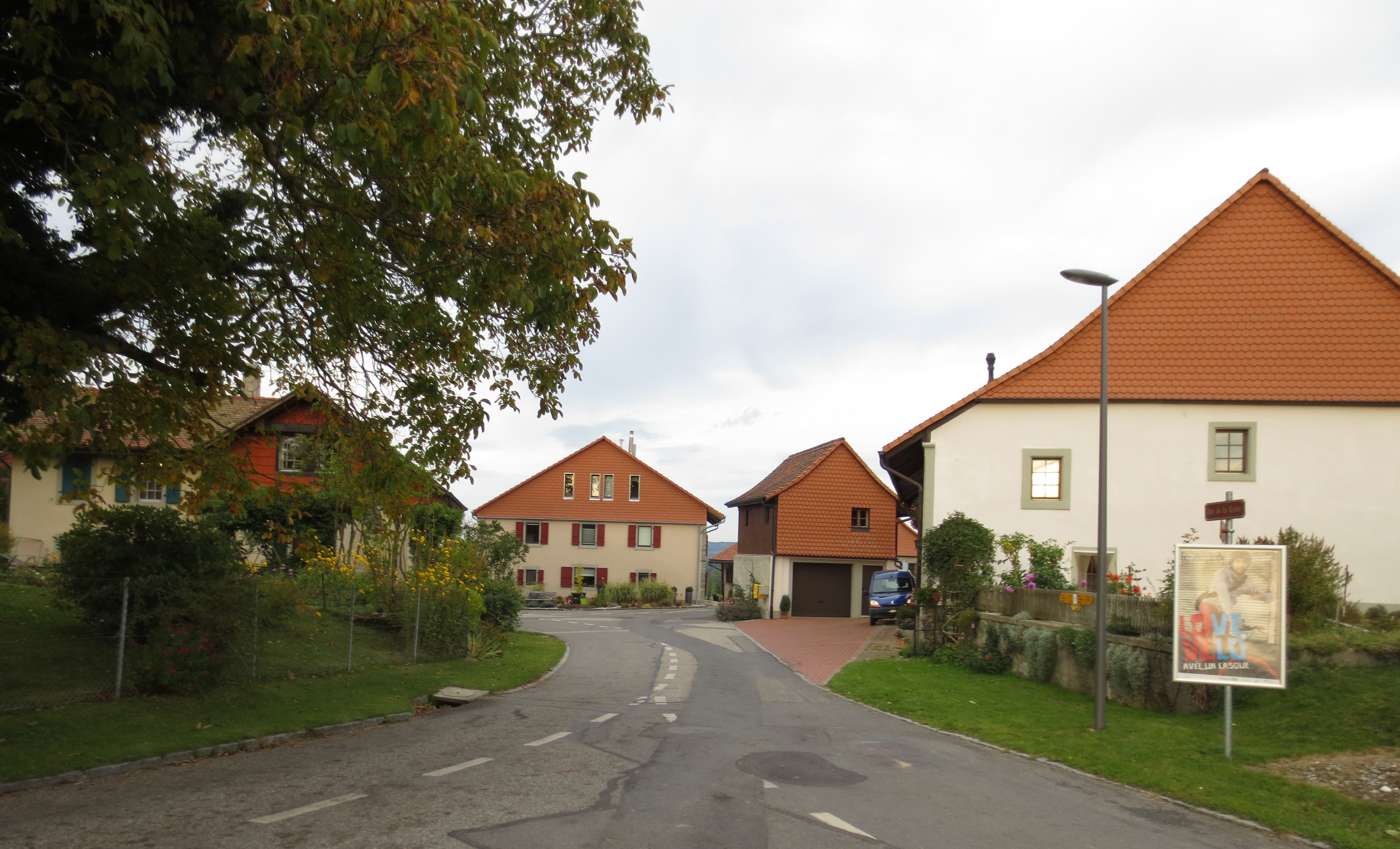

- Flag Coat of arms
- Location of Vucherens
- Location within Switzerland Location within Canton of Vaud
- Coordinates: 46°37′N 6°48′E
- Country: Switzerland
- Canton: Vaud
- District: Broye-Vully

Government
  - Mayor: Syndic; Chenevard Michel

Area
  - Total: 3.26 km^{2} (1.26 sq mi)
- Elevation: 678 m (2,224 ft)

Population (2005)
  - Total: 504
  - Density: 155/km^{2} (400/sq mi)
- Time zone: UTC+01:00 (CET)
  - Summer (DST): UTC+02:00 (CEST)
- Postal code: 1509
- SFOS number: 5692
- ISO 3166 code: CH-VD
- Surrounded by: Carrouge, Hermenches, Ropraz, Syens, Vulliens
- Twin towns: Droiturier (France)
- Website: www.vucherens.ch

Vucherens is a municipality in the district Broye-Vully in the canton of Vaud in Switzerland.

== Geography ==
Vucherens has an area, as of 2009, of 3.3 square kilometers (1.3 mi^{2}). Of this area, 2.1 km^{2} (0.81 mi^{2}) or 64.2% is used for agricultural purposes, while 0.76 km^{2} (0.29 mi^{2}) or 23.2% is forested. Of the rest of the land, 0.4 km^{2} (0.15 mi^{2}) or 12.2% is settled (buildings or roads), 0.01 km^{2} (2.5 acres) or 0.3% is either rivers or lakes.

Of the built up area, industrial buildings made up 1.2% of the total area while housing and buildings made up 7.0% and transportation infrastructure made up 4.0%. Out of the forested land, 21.1% of the total land area is heavily forested and 2.1% is covered with orchards or small clusters of trees. Of the agricultural land, 38.8% is used for growing crops and 24.8% is pastures. All the water in the municipality is flowing water.

The municipality was part of the Moudon District until it was dissolved on 31 August 2006, and Vucherens became part of the new district of Broye-Vully.

== Coat of arms ==
The blazon of the municipal coat of arms is Gules, on Owl Argent statant on a Coupeaux Vert.

== Demographics ==
Vucherens has a population (as of December 2020) of 618. As of 2008, 11.4% of the population are resident foreign nationals. Over the last 10 years (1999–2009) the population has changed at a rate of 23.6%. It has changed at a rate of 21.7% due to migration and at a rate of 2.8% due to births and deaths.

Most of the population (as of 2000) speaks French (416 or 93.7%), with German being second most common (13 or 2.9%) and Portuguese being third (7 or 1.6%). There is 1 person who speaks Italian and 1 person who speaks Romansh.

The age distribution, as of 2009, in Vucherens is; 55 children or 10.4% of the population are between 0 and 9 years old and 72 teenagers or 13.6% are between 10 and 19. Of the adult population, 67 people or 12.7% of the population are between 20 and 29 years old. 65 people or 12.3% are between 30 and 39, 97 people or 18.3% are between 40 and 49, and 64 people or 12.1% are between 50 and 59. The senior population distribution is 49 people or 9.3% of the population are between 60 and 69 years old, 41 people or 7.8% are between 70 and 79, there are 17 people or 3.2% who are between 80 and 89, and there are 2 people or 0.4% who are 90 and older.

As of 2000, there were 180 people who were single and never married in the municipality. There were 211 married individuals, 25 widows or widowers and 28 individuals who are divorced.

As of 2000, there were 187 private households in the municipality, and an average of 2.4 persons per household. There were 54 households that consist of only one person and 15 households with five or more people. Out of a total of 188 households that answered this question, 28.7% were households made up of just one person and there was 1 adult who lived with their parents. Of the rest of the households, there are 57 married couples without children, 60 married couples with children. There were 10 single parents with a child or children. There were 5 households that were made up of unrelated people and 1 household that was made up of some sort of institution or another collective housing.

In 2000 there were 72 single family homes (or 55.8% of the total) out of a total of 129 inhabited buildings. There were 25 multi-family buildings (19.4%), along with 26 multi-purpose buildings that were mostly used for housing (20.2%) and 6 other use buildings (commercial or industrial) that also had some housing (4.7%). Of the single family homes 18 were built before 1919, while 8 were built between 1990 and 2000. The most multi-family homes (10) were built before 1919 and the next most (5) were built between 1981 and 1990.

In 2000, a total of 181 apartments (91.0% of the total) were permanently occupied, while 12 apartments (6.0%) were seasonally occupied and 6 apartments (3.0%) were empty. As of 2009, the construction rate of new housing units was 0 new units per 1000 residents. The vacancy rate for the municipality, in 2010, was 0%.

The historical population is given in the following chart:

== Twin Town ==
Vucherens is twinned with the town of Droiturier, France.

== Politics ==
In the 2007 federal election the most popular party was the SVP which received 27.8% of the vote. The next three most popular parties were the SP (22.05%), the Green Party (14.85%) and the FDP (13.81%). In the federal election, a total of 170 votes were cast, and the voter turnout was 47.2%.

== Economy ==
As of 2010, Vucherens had an unemployment rate of 3.5%. As of 2008, there were 23 people employed in the primary economic sector and about 10 businesses involved in this sector. 15 people were employed in the secondary sector and there was 1 business in this sector. 119 people were employed in the tertiary sector, with 14 businesses in this sector. There were 226 residents of the municipality who were employed in some capacity, of which females made up 46.9% of the workforce.

In 2008 the total number of full-time equivalent jobs was 132. The number of jobs in the primary sector was 14, all of which were in agriculture. The number of jobs in the secondary sector was 13, all of which were in manufacturing. The number of jobs in the tertiary sector was 105. In the tertiary sector; 83 or 79.0% were in wholesale or retail sales or the repair of motor vehicles, 6 or 5.7% were in a hotel or restaurant, 3 or 2.9% were technical professionals or scientists, 3 or 2.9% were in education.

In 2000, there were 125 workers who commuted into the municipality and 159 workers who commuted away. The municipality is a net exporter of workers, with about 1.3 workers leaving the municipality for every one entering. Of the working population, 10.2% used public transportation to get to work, and 61.5% used a private car.

== Religion ==
From the 2000 census, 90 or 20.3% were Roman Catholic, while 287 or 64.6% belonged to the Swiss Reformed Church. Of the rest of the population, there were 20 individuals (or about 4.50% of the population) who belonged to another Christian church. There were 2 (or about 0.45% of the population) who were Islamic. 54 (or about 12.16% of the population) belonged to no church, are agnostic or atheist, and 1 individuals (or about 0.23% of the population) did not answer the question.

== Education ==
In Vucherens about 186 or (41.9%) of the population have completed non-mandatory upper secondary education, and 53 or (11.9%) have completed additional higher education (either university or a Fachhochschule). Of the 53 who completed tertiary schooling, 58.5% were Swiss men, 28.3% were Swiss women.

In the 2009/2010 school year there were a total of 66 students in the Vucherens school district. In the Vaud cantonal school system, two years of non-obligatory pre-school are provided by the political districts. During the school year, the political district provided pre-school care for a total of 155 children of which 83 children (53.5%) received subsidized pre-school care. The canton's primary school program requires students to attend for four years. There were 31 students in the municipal primary school program. The obligatory lower secondary school program lasts for six years and there were 35 students in those schools.

As of 2000, there were 27 students in Vucherens who came from another municipality, while 55 residents attended schools outside the municipality.
