= Carrouge =

- Former municipality
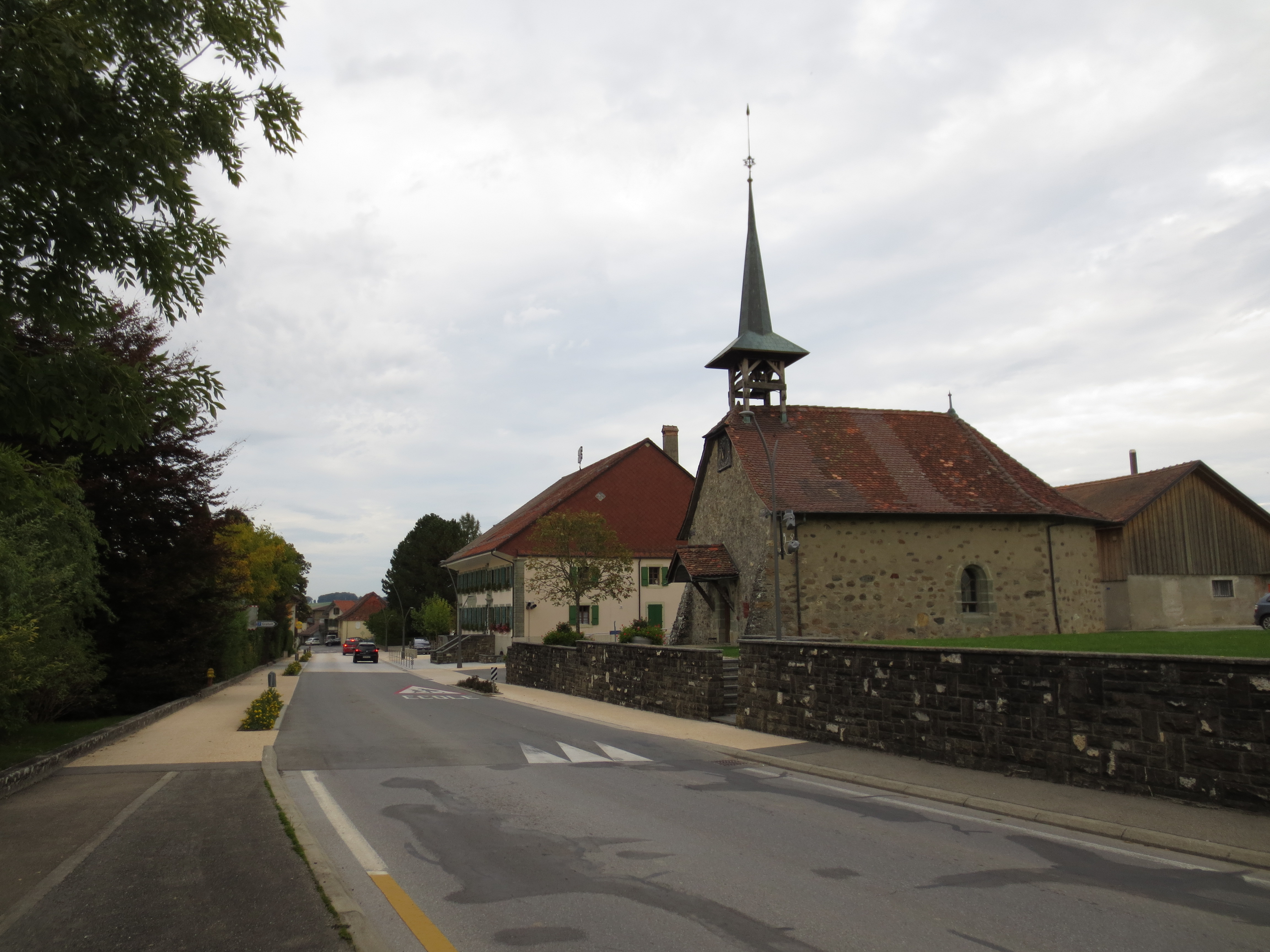

- Flag Coat of arms
- Location of Carrouge
- Location within Switzerland Location within Canton of Vaud
- Coordinates: 46°36′N 06°46′E
- Country: Switzerland
- Canton: Vaud
- District: Broye-Vully

Government
  - Mayor: Syndic; André Jordan

Area
  - Total: 5.42 km^{2} (2.09 sq mi)
- Elevation: 722 m (2,369 ft)

Population (2004)
  - Total: 790
  - Density: 150/km^{2} (380/sq mi)
- Demonym(s): Les Carrougeois; Les Choupions
- Time zone: UTC+01:00 (CET)
  - Summer (DST): UTC+02:00 (CEST)
- Postal code: 1084
- SFOS number: 5782
- ISO 3166 code: CH-VD
- Surrounded by: Vucherens, Vulliens, Ferlens (VD), Mézières (VD), Montpreveyres, Ropraz
- Twin towns: Carrouges (France)
- Website: www.jorat-mezieres.ch

Carrouge (French pronunciation: [kaʁuʒ]) is a former municipality in the district of Broye-Vully in the canton of Vaud in Switzerland. On 1 July 2016 the former municipalities of Carrouge, Ferlens and Mézières merged into the new municipality of Jorat-Mézières.

== History ==
Carrouge is first mentioned in 1255 as Carrogium.

== Geography ==
Carrouge has an area, as of 2009, of 5.42 square kilometers (2.09 sq mi). Of this area, 3.83 km^{2} (1.48 sq mi) or 70.7% is used for agricultural purposes, while 1.07 km^{2} (0.41 sq mi) or 19.7% is forested. Of the rest of the land, 0.51 km^{2} (0.20 sq mi) or 9.4% is settled (buildings or roads).

Of the built up area, housing and buildings made up 5.2% and transportation infrastructure made up 3.1%. Out of the forested land, 17.9% of the total land area is heavily forested and 1.8% is covered with orchards or small clusters of trees. Of the agricultural land, 52.6% is used for growing crops and 17.2% is pastures.

The municipality was part of the Oron District until it was dissolved on 31 August 2006, and Carrouge became part of the new district of Broye-Vully. The municipality is located in the Jorat. It consists of the linear village of Carrouge and multiple hamlets. The municipalities of Carrouge, Ferlens and Mézières are considering a merger at a date in the future into the new municipality of with an, as of 2011, undetermined name.

== Coat of arms ==
The blazon of the municipal coat of arms is Gules, a saltire Or, in chief, dexter and sinister three roses, and in base a crescent upwards all of the same.

== Demographics ==
Carrouge has a population (as of December 2020) of 1,208. As of 2008, 9.9% of the population are resident foreign nationals. Over the last 10 years (1999–2009 ) the population has changed at a rate of 18.1%. It has changed at a rate of 12.4% due to migration and at a rate of 5.9% due to births and deaths.

Most of the population (as of 2000) speaks French (724 or 92.8%), with German being second most common (29 or 3.7%) and Italian being third (7 or 0.9%).

Of the population in the municipality 217 or about 27.8% were born in Carrouge and lived there in 2000. There were 338 or 43.3% who were born in the same canton, while 107 or 13.7% were born somewhere else in Switzerland, and 85 or 10.9% were born outside of Switzerland.

In 2008 there were 12 live births to Swiss citizens and 1 birth to non-Swiss citizens, and in same time span there were 9 deaths of Swiss citizens. Ignoring immigration and emigration, the population of Swiss citizens increased by 3 while the foreign population increased by 1. There was 1 Swiss man and 1 Swiss woman who immigrated back to Switzerland. At the same time, there was 1 non-Swiss man and 1 non-Swiss woman who immigrated from another country to Switzerland. The total Swiss population change in 2008 (from all sources, including moves across municipal borders) was an increase of 3 and the non-Swiss population increased by 6 people. This represents a population growth rate of 1.0%.

The age distribution, as of 2009, in Carrouge is; 122 children or 13.3% of the population are between 0 and 9 years old and 119 teenagers or 13.0% are between 10 and 19. Of the adult population, 110 people or 12.0% of the population are between 20 and 29 years old. 134 people or 14.7% are between 30 and 39, 155 people or 17.0% are between 40 and 49, and 115 people or 12.6% are between 50 and 59. The senior population distribution is 75 people or 8.2% of the population are between 60 and 69 years old, 47 people or 5.1% are between 70 and 79, there are 28 people or 3.1% who are 80 and 89, and there are 9 people or 1.0% who are 90 and older.

As of 2000, there were 319 people who were single and never married in the municipality. There were 387 married individuals, 40 widows or widowers and 34 individuals who are divorced.

As of 2000, there were 313 private households in the municipality, and an average of 2.4 persons per household. There were 87 households that consist of only one person and 26 households with five or more people. Out of a total of 317 households that answered this question, 27.4% were households made up of just one person and there were 2 adults who lived with their parents. Of the rest of the households, there are 90 married couples without children, 112 married couples with children There were 19 single parents with a child or children. There were 3 households that were made up of unrelated people and 4 households that were made up of some sort of institution or another collective housing.

In 2000, there were 104 single family homes (or 53.9% of the total) out of a total of 193 inhabited buildings. There were 42 multi-family buildings (21.8%), along with 43 multi-purpose buildings that were mostly used for housing (22.3%) and 4 other use buildings (commercial or industrial) that also had some housing (2.1%). Of the single family homes 27 were built before 1919, while 9 were built between 1990 and 2000. The greatest number of single family homes (37) were built between 1981 and 1990. The most multi-family homes (15) were built before 1919 and the next most (12) were built between 1981 and 1990.

In 2000, there were 328 apartments in the municipality. The most common apartment size was 4 rooms of which there were 100. There were 7 single room apartments and 102 apartments with five or more rooms. Of these apartments, a total of 300 apartments (91.5% of the total) were permanently occupied, while 22 apartments (6.7%) were seasonally occupied and 6 apartments (1.8%) were empty. As of 2009, the construction rate of new housing units was 5.5 new units per 1000 residents. The vacancy rate for the municipality, in 2010, was 0.77%.

The historical population is given in the following chart:

== Politics ==
In the 2007 federal election the most popular party was the SVP which received 26.01% of the vote. The next three most popular parties were the Green Party (21.57%), the SP (18.81%) and the FDP (13.18%). In the federal election, a total of 286 votes were cast, and the voter turnout was 46.5%.

== Economy ==
As of 2010, Carrouge had an unemployment rate of 4.3%. As of 2008, there were 42 people employed in the primary economic sector and about 12 businesses involved in this sector. 33 people were employed in the secondary sector and there were 7 businesses in this sector. 105 people were employed in the tertiary sector, with 30 businesses in this sector. There were 407 residents of the municipality who were employed in some capacity, of which females made up 45.2% of the workforce.

In 2008 the total number of full-time equivalent jobs was 149. The number of jobs in the primary sector was 33, of which 27 were in agriculture and 6 were in forestry or lumber production. The number of jobs in the secondary sector was 31 of which 12 or (38.7%) were in manufacturing and 19 (61.3%) were in construction. The number of jobs in the tertiary sector was 85. In the tertiary sector; 46 or 54.1% were in wholesale or retail sales or the repair of motor vehicles, 5 or 5.9% were in the movement and storage of goods, 5 or 5.9% were in a hotel or restaurant, 2 or 2.4% were in the information industry, 12 or 14.1% were the insurance or financial industry, 2 or 2.4% were technical professionals or scientists, 3 or 3.5% were in education and 1 was in health care.

In 2000, there were 33 workers who commuted into the municipality and 312 workers who commuted away. The municipality is a net exporter of workers, with about 9.5 workers leaving the municipality for every one entering. Of the working population, 10.6% used public transportation to get to work, and 69.5% used a private car.

== Religion ==
From the 2000 census, 144 or 18.5% were Roman Catholic, while 446 or 57.2% belonged to the Swiss Reformed Church. Of the rest of the population, and there were 32 individuals (or about 4.10% of the population) who belonged to another Christian church. There were 3 (or about 0.38% of the population) who were Islamic. There were 2 individuals who were Buddhist, 3 individuals who were Hindu and 3 individuals who belonged to another church. 116 (or about 14.87% of the population) belonged to no church, are agnostic or atheist, and 31 individuals (or about 3.97% of the population) did not answer the question.

== Education ==
In Carrouge about 313 or (40.1%) of the population have completed non-mandatory upper secondary education, and 116 or (14.9%) have completed additional higher education (either university or a Fachhochschule). Of the 116 who completed tertiary schooling, 55.2% were Swiss men, 31.0% were Swiss women, 8.6% were non-Swiss men and 5.2% were non-Swiss women.

In the 2009/2010 school year there were a total of 130 students in the Carrouge (VD) school district. In the Vaud cantonal school system, two years of non-obligatory pre-school are provided by the political districts. During the school year, the political district provided pre-school care for a total of 155 children of which 83 children (53.5%) received subsidized pre-school care. The canton's primary school program requires students to attend for four years. There were 69 students in the municipal primary school program. The obligatory lower secondary school program lasts for six years and there were 61 students in those schools.

As of 2000, there were 14 students in Carrouge who came from another municipality, while 118 residents attended schools outside the municipality.

== Twin town ==
- Carrouges, France since 2000.
