= Ropraz =

- Municipality
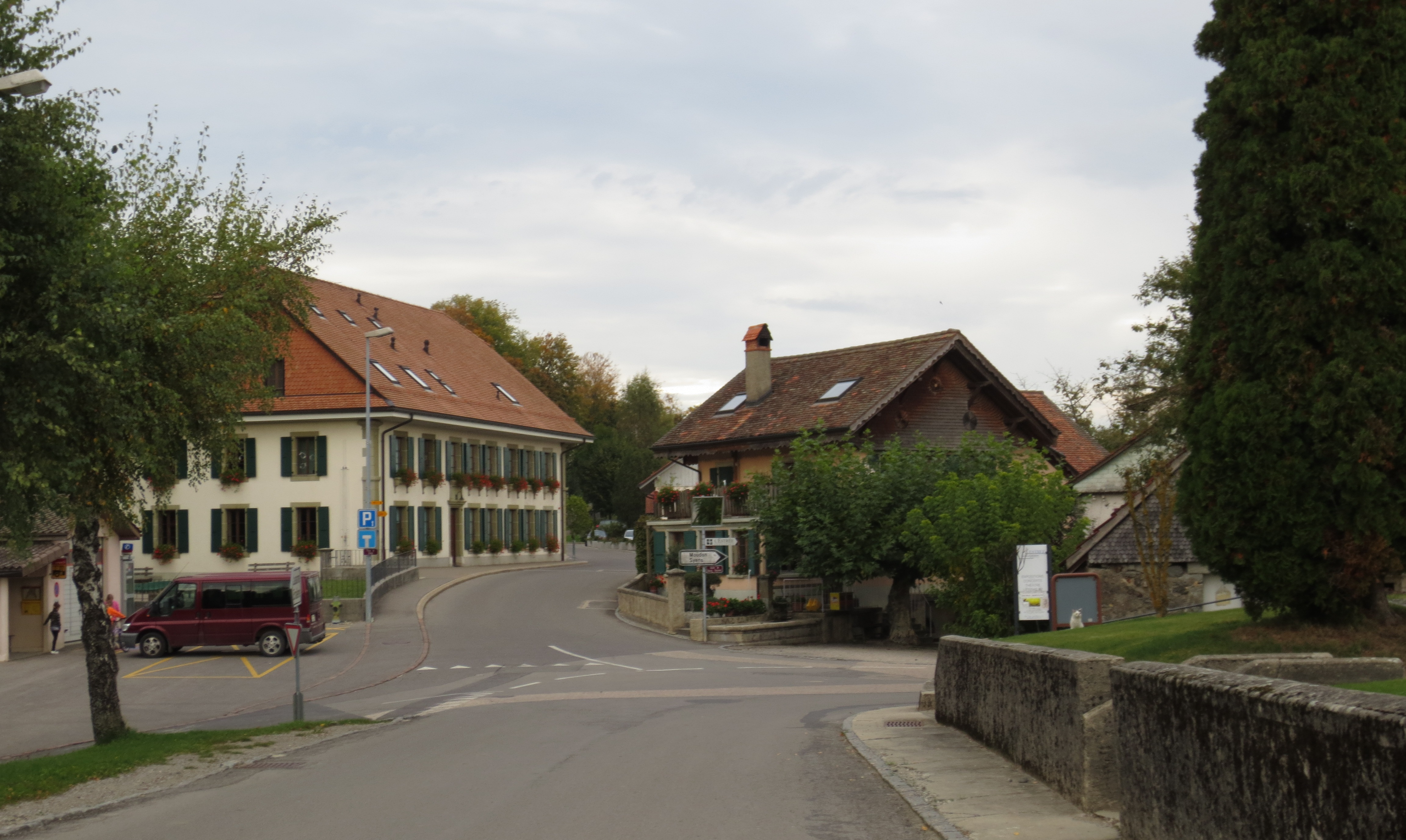

- Flag Coat of arms
- Location of Ropraz
- Location within Switzerland Location within Canton of Vaud
- Coordinates: 46°36′N 6°45′E
- Country: Switzerland
- Canton: Vaud
- District: Broye-Vully

Government
  - Mayor: Syndic; Philippe Jordan

Area
  - Total: 4.83 km^{2} (1.86 sq mi)
- Elevation: 746 m (2,448 ft)

Population (2003)
  - Total: 351
  - Density: 72.7/km^{2} (188/sq mi)
- Time zone: UTC+01:00 (CET)
  - Summer (DST): UTC+02:00 (CEST)
- Postal code: 1088
- SFOS number: 5798
- ISO 3166 code: CH-VD
- Surrounded by: Carrouge, Corcelles-le-Jorat, Hermenches, Montpreveyres, Vucherens
- Website: www.ropraz.ch

Ropraz is a municipality in the district of Broye-Vully in the canton of Vaud in Switzerland.

== History ==
Ropraz is first mentioned in 1234 as Rospraz.

== Geography ==
Ropraz has an area, as of 2009, of 4.83 square kilometers (1.86 sq mi). Of this area, 3.42 km^{2} (1.32 sq mi) or 70.8% is used for agricultural purposes, while 0.94 km^{2} (0.36 sq mi) or 19.5% is forested. Of the rest of the land, 0.43 km^{2} (0.17 sq mi) or 8.9% is settled (buildings or roads).

Of the built up area, housing and buildings made up 3.3% and transportation infrastructure made up 4.1%. Out of the forested land, 17.6% of the total land area is heavily forested and 1.9% is covered with orchards or small clusters of trees. Of the agricultural land, 49.3% is used for growing crops and 19.5% is pastures, while 2.1% is used for orchards or vine crops.

The municipality was part of the Oron District until it was dissolved on 31 August 2006, and Ropraz became part of the new district of Broye-Vully.

The municipality is located along the road between Lausanne and Bern. It consists of the village of Ropraz, with the village sections of Bourg-du-Milieu and Bourg-Dessous and the hamlets of Vers-chez-les-Rod and Les Ussières.

== Coat of arms ==
The blazon of the municipal coat of arms is Gules, a Cat effarouché proper langued purpure in forepaws holding a Key Argent.

== Demographics ==
Ropraz has a population (as of December 2020) of 529. As of 2008, 8.3% of the population are resident foreign nationals. Over the last 10 years (1999–2009 ) the population has changed at a rate of 4.1%. It has changed at a rate of 2.9% due to migration and at a rate of 4.1% due to births and deaths.

Most of the population (as of 2000) speaks French (325 or 87.1%), with German being second most common (11 or 2.9%) and Serbo-Croatian being third (9 or 2.4%). There are 4 people who speak Italian.

Of the population in the municipality 122 or about 32.7% were born in Ropraz and lived there in 2000. There were 116 or 31.1% who were born in the same canton, while 47 or 12.6% were born somewhere else in Switzerland, and 44 or 11.8% were born outside of Switzerland.

In 2008 there were 3 live births to Swiss citizens and 1 birth to non-Swiss citizens, and in same time span there were 4 deaths of Swiss citizens. Ignoring immigration and emigration, the population of Swiss citizens decreased by 1 while the foreign population increased by 1. There was 1 Swiss man who emigrated from Switzerland and 1 Swiss woman who immigrated back to Switzerland. At the same time, there was 1 non-Swiss man and 1 non-Swiss woman who immigrated from another country to Switzerland. The total Swiss population change in 2008 (from all sources, including moves across municipal borders) was an increase of 15 and the non-Swiss population decreased by 7 people. This represents a population growth rate of 2.3%.

The age distribution, as of 2009, in Ropraz is; 35 children or 9.8% of the population are between 0 and 9 years old and 41 teenagers or 11.5% are between 10 and 19. Of the adult population, 40 people or 11.2% of the population are between 20 and 29 years old. 40 people or 11.2% are between 30 and 39, 59 people or 16.6% are between 40 and 49, and 54 people or 15.2% are between 50 and 59. The senior population distribution is 39 people or 11.0% of the population are between 60 and 69 years old, 29 people or 8.1% are between 70 and 79, there are 18 people or 5.1% who are between 80 and 89, and there is 1 person who is 90 and older.

As of 2000, there were 151 people who were single and never married in the municipality. There were 187 married individuals, 15 widows or widowers and 20 individuals who are divorced.

As of 2000, there were 134 private households in the municipality, and an average of 2.5 persons per household. There were 39 households that consist of only one person and 11 households with five or more people. Out of a total of 136 households that answered this question, 28.7% were households made up of just one person and there was 1 adult who lived with their parents. Of the rest of the households, there are 41 married couples without children, 46 married couples with children There were 4 single parents with a child or children. There were 3 households that were made up of unrelated people and 2 households that were made up of some sort of institution or another collective housing.

In 2000 there were 49 single family homes (or 52.1% of the total) out of a total of 94 inhabited buildings. There were 19 multi-family buildings (20.2%), along with 19 multi-purpose buildings that were mostly used for housing (20.2%) and 7 other use buildings (commercial or industrial) that also had some housing (7.4%). Of the single family homes 14 were built before 1919, while 8 were built between 1990 and 2000. The most multi-family homes (10) were built before 1919 and the next most (4) were built between 1961 and 1970. There was 1 multi-family house built between 1996 and 2000.

In 2000 there were 149 apartments in the municipality. The most common apartment size was 4 rooms of which there were 51. There were 7 single room apartments and 40 apartments with five or more rooms. Of these apartments, a total of 132 apartments (88.6% of the total) were permanently occupied, while 10 apartments (6.7%) were seasonally occupied and 7 apartments (4.7%) were empty. As of 2009, the construction rate of new housing units was 0 new units per 1000 residents. The vacancy rate for the municipality, in 2010, was 0.62%.

The historical population is given in the following chart:

== Politics ==
In the 2007 federal election the most popular party was the SVP which received 36.72% of the vote. The next three most popular parties were the FDP (20.79%), the SP (15.28%) and the Green Party (8.75%). In the federal election, a total of 107 votes were cast, and the voter turnout was 42.6%.

== Economy ==
As of 2010, Ropraz had an unemployment rate of 2.7%. As of 2008, there were 34 people employed in the primary economic sector and about 13 businesses involved in this sector. 9 people were employed in the secondary sector and there were 6 businesses in this sector. 59 people were employed in the tertiary sector, with 15 businesses in this sector. There were 163 residents of the municipality who were employed in some capacity, of which females made up 38.0% of the workforce.

In 2008 the total number of full-time equivalent jobs was 74. The number of jobs in the primary sector was 23, all of which were in agriculture. The number of jobs in the secondary sector was 8 of which 5 or (62.5%) were in manufacturing and 3 (37.5%) were in construction. The number of jobs in the tertiary sector was 43. In the tertiary sector; 2 or 4.7% were in wholesale or retail sales or the repair of motor vehicles, 4 or 9.3% were in the movement and storage of goods, 2 or 4.7% were in a hotel or restaurant, 5 or 11.6% were in the information industry, 15 or 34.9% were the insurance or financial industry, 1 was in education.

In 2000, there were 75 workers who commuted into the municipality and 105 workers who commuted away. The municipality is a net exporter of workers, with about 1.4 workers leaving the municipality for every one entering. Of the working population, 11% used public transportation to get to work, and 58.9% used a private car.

== Religion ==
From the 2000 census, 49 or 13.1% were Roman Catholic, while 230 or 61.7% belonged to the Swiss Reformed Church. Of the rest of the population, there was 1 member of an Orthodox church. There were 3 (or about 0.80% of the population) who were Islamic. There were 2 individuals who were Buddhist and 1 individual who belonged to another church. 42 (or about 11.26% of the population) belonged to no church, are agnostic or atheist, and 45 individuals (or about 12.06% of the population) did not answer the question.

== Education ==
In Ropraz about 123 or (33.0%) of the population have completed non-mandatory upper secondary education, and 53 or (14.2%) have completed additional higher education (either university or a Fachhochschule). Of the 53 who completed tertiary schooling, 58.5% were Swiss men, 30.2% were Swiss women.

In the 2009/2010 school year there were a total of 34 students in the Ropraz school district. In the Vaud cantonal school system, two years of non-obligatory pre-school are provided by the political districts. During the school year, the political district provided pre-school care for a total of 155 children of which 83 children (53.5%) received subsidized pre-school care. The canton's primary school program requires students to attend for four years. There were 19 students in the municipal primary school program. The obligatory lower secondary school program lasts for six years and there were 15 students in those schools.

As of 2000, there were 34 students in Ropraz who came from another municipality, while 52 residents attended schools outside the municipality.
