= Riex =

- Former municipality
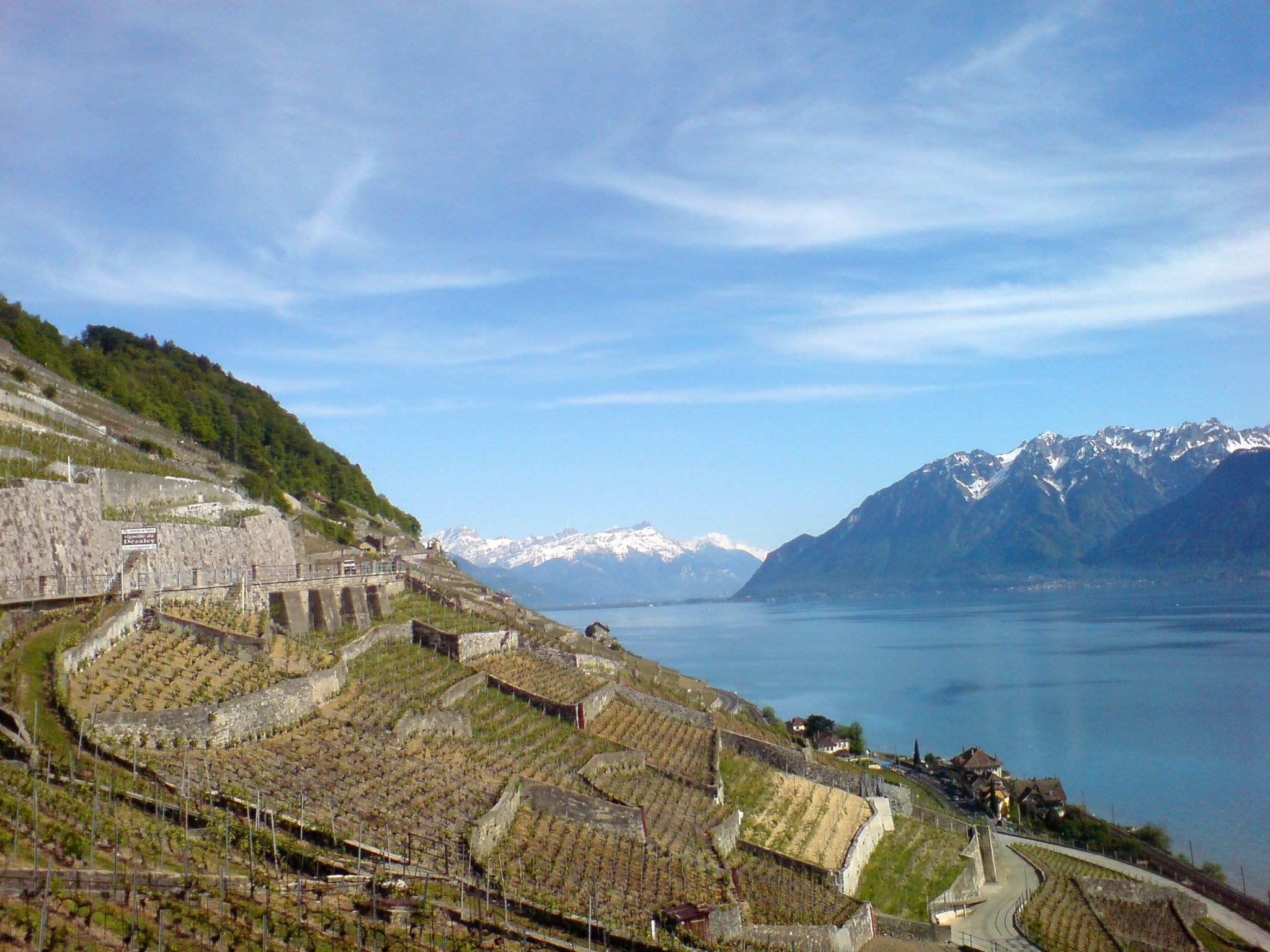
- Vineyards near Riex village

- Flag Coat of arms
- Location of Riex
- Location within Switzerland Location within Canton of Vaud
- Coordinates: 46°29′N 6°44′E
- Country: Switzerland
- Canton: Vaud
- District: Lavaux-Oron

Area
  - Total: 1.37 km^{2} (0.53 sq mi)
- Elevation: 437 m (1,434 ft)

Population (2009)
  - Total: 290
  - Density: 210/km^{2} (550/sq mi)
- Time zone: UTC+01:00 (CET)
  - Summer (DST): UTC+02:00 (CEST)
- SFOS number: 5608
- ISO 3166 code: CH-VD
- Surrounded by: Cully, Epesses, Forel (Lavaux)
- Website: www.riex.ch

Riex is a former municipality in the canton of Vaud in Switzerland, located in the district of Lavaux-Oron.

The municipalities of Cully, Epesses, Grandvaux, Riex and Villette (Lavaux) merged on 1 July 2011 into the new municipality of Bourg-en-Lavaux.

== History ==
Riex is first mentioned in 1184 as Ruez.

== Geography ==
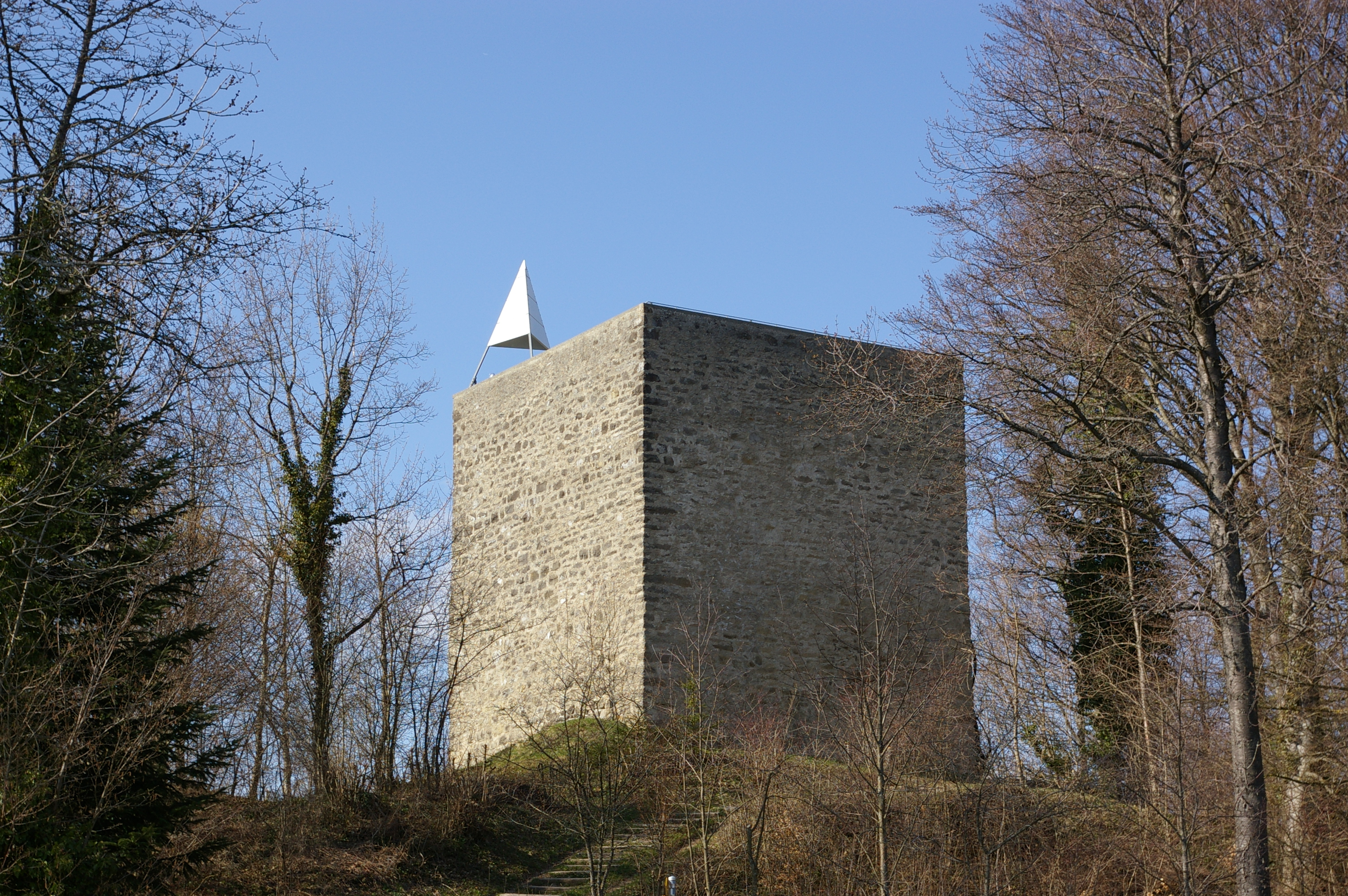
Tour de Gourze

Aerial view, Riex in the foreground (1954)

Riex has an area, as of 2009, of 1.37 square kilometres (0.53 mi^{2}). Of this area, 1.04 km^{2} (0.40 mi^{2}) or 75.9% is used for agricultural purposes, while 0.13 km^{2} (0.050 mi^{2}) or 9.5% is forested. Of the rest of the land, 0.15 km^{2} (37 acres) or 10.9% is settled (buildings or roads) and 0.01 km^{2} (2.5 acres) or 0.7% is unproductive land.

Of the built up area, housing and buildings made up 5.1% and transportation infrastructure made up 5.8%. Out of the forested land, 5.8% of the total land area is heavily forested and 3.6% is covered with orchards or small clusters of trees. Of the agricultural land, 6.6% is used for growing crops and 35.0% is pastures, while 34.3% is used for orchards or vine crops.

The municipality was part of the Lavaux District until it was dissolved on 31 August 2006, and Riex became part of the new district of Lavaux-Oron.

The municipality is located in the Lavaux vineyards. It consists of the haufendorf village (an irregular, unplanned and quite closely packed village, built around a central square) of Riex and the Tower of Gourze.

== Coat of arms ==
The blazon of the municipal coat of arms is Per bend Gules and Argent, overall from a Base irregular Vert issuant a vine tree of the same fructed counterchanged.

== Demographics ==
Riex has a population (as of 2009) of 290. As of 2008, 14.9% of the population are resident foreign nationals. Over the last 10 years (1999–2009 ) the population has changed at a rate of 3.6%. It has changed at a rate of -2.1% due to migration and at a rate of 5% due to births and deaths.

Most of the population (as of 2000) speaks French (259 or 86.3%), with German being second most common (21 or 7.0%) and Portuguese being third (7 or 2.3%). There are 2 people who speak Italian.

Of the population in the municipality 78 or about 26.0% were born in Riex and lived there in 2000. There were 111 or 37.0% who were born in the same canton, while 50 or 16.7% were born somewhere else in Switzerland, and 51 or 17.0% were born outside of Switzerland.

In 2008 there were 2 live births to Swiss citizens and were 3 deaths of Swiss citizens and 1 non-Swiss citizen death. Ignoring immigration and emigration, the population of Swiss citizens decreased by 1 while the foreign population decreased by 1. There was 1 Swiss man who immigrated back to Switzerland and 11 Swiss women who emigrated from Switzerland. At the same time, there were 2 non-Swiss men who immigrated from another country to Switzerland and 2 non-Swiss women who emigrated from Switzerland to another country. The total Swiss population change in 2008 (from all sources, including moves across municipal borders) was an increase of 9 and the non-Swiss population remained the same. This represents a population growth rate of 3.3%.

The age distribution, as of 2009, in Riex is; 31 children or 10.7% of the population are between 0 and 9 years old and 34 teenagers or 11.7% are between 10 and 19. Of the adult population, 31 people or 10.7% of the population are between 20 and 29 years old. 42 people or 14.5% are between 30 and 39, 47 people or 16.2% are between 40 and 49, and 35 people or 12.1% are between 50 and 59. The senior population distribution is 35 people or 12.1% of the population are between 60 and 69 years old, 28 people or 9.7% are between 70 and 79, there are 7 people or 2.4% who are between 80 and 89.

As of 2000, there were 103 people who were single and never married in the municipality. There were 160 married individuals, 21 widows or widowers and 16 individuals who are divorced.

As of 2000 the average number of residents per living room was 0.54 which is fewer people per room than the cantonal average of 0.61 per room. In this case, a room is defined as space of a housing unit of at least 4 m^{2} (40 ft^{2}) as normal bedrooms, dining rooms, living rooms, kitchens and habitable cellars and attics. About 53.1% of the total households were owner occupied, or in other words did not pay rent (though they may have a mortgage or a rent-to-own agreement).

As of 2000, there were 140 private households in the municipality, and an average of 2.1 persons per household. There were 49 households that consist of only one person and 6 households with five or more people. Out of a total of 147 households that answered this question, 33.3% were households made up of just one person. Of the rest of the households, there are 45 married couples without children, 37 married couples with children There were 6 single parents with a child or children. There were 3 households that were made up of unrelated people and 7 households that were made up of some sort of institution or another collective housing.

In 2000 there were 52 single family homes (or 53.1% of the total) out of a total of 98 inhabited buildings. There were 23 multi-family buildings (23.5%), along with 20 multi-purpose buildings that were mostly used for housing (20.4%) and 3 other use buildings (commercial or industrial) that also had some housing (3.1%). Of the single family homes 31 were built before 1919, while 1 was built between 1990 and 2000. The most multi-family homes (20) were built before 1919 and the next most (1) were built between 1946 and 1960.

In 2000 there were 151 apartments in the municipality. The most common apartment size was 3 rooms of which there were 46. There were 11 single room apartments and 35 apartments with five or more rooms. Of these apartments, a total of 128 apartments (84.8% of the total) were permanently occupied, while 21 apartments (13.9%) were seasonally occupied and 2 apartments (1.3%) were empty. As of 2009, the construction rate of new housing units was 0 new units per 1000 residents. The vacancy rate for the municipality, in 2010, was 0%.

The historical population is given in the following chart:

== Heritage sites of national significance ==
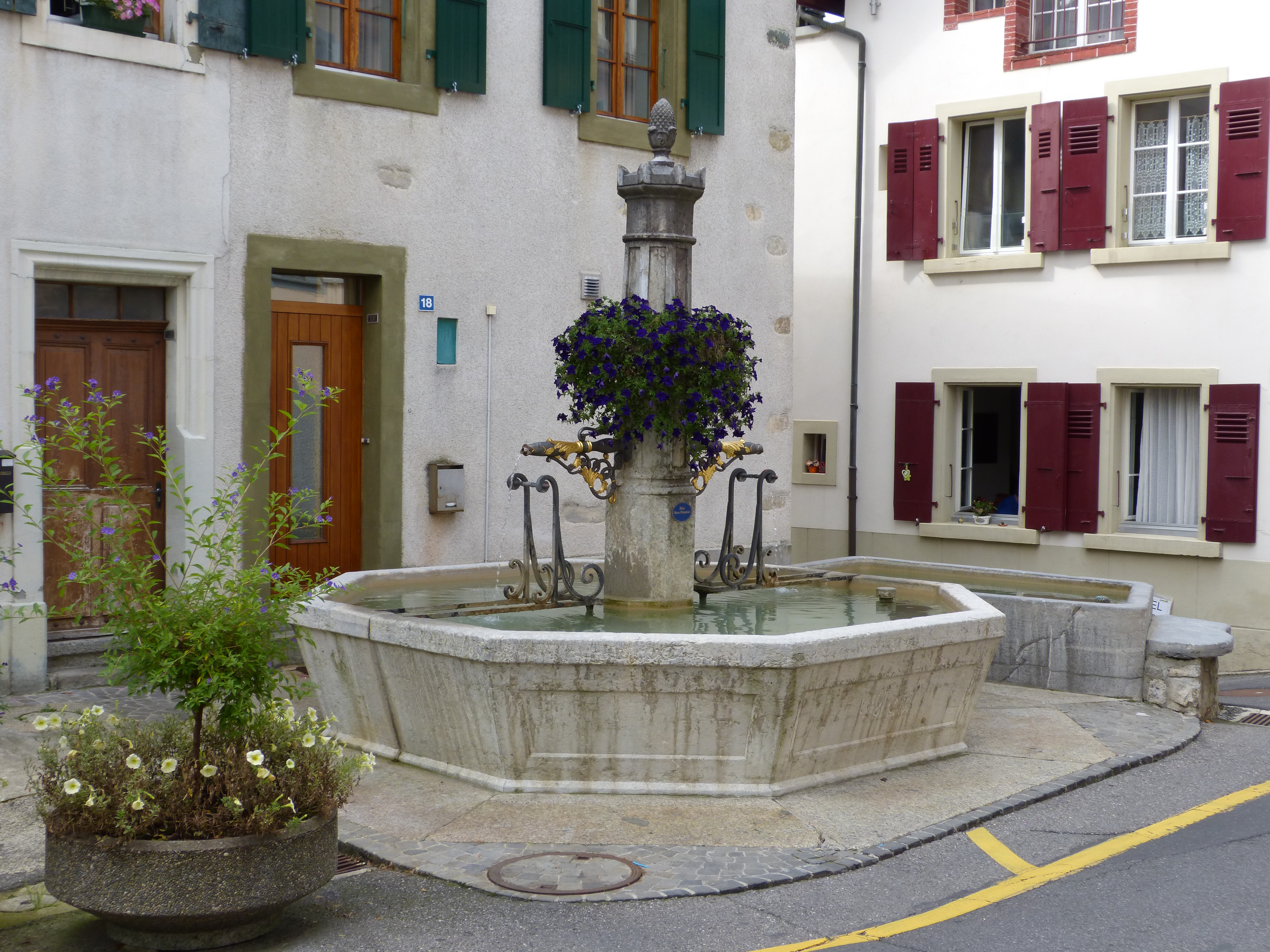
The fountain of Riex

The municipality includes part of the UNESCO World Heritage Site: Lavaux, Vineyard Terraces which is also listed as a Swiss heritage site of national significance. The entire village of Riex is part of the Inventory of Swiss Heritage Sites.

== Politics ==
In the 2007 federal election the most popular party was the FDP which received 22.3% of the vote. The next three most popular parties were the SVP (21.35%), the Green Party (17.67%) and the LPS Party (14.93%). In the federal election, a total of 115 votes were cast, and the voter turnout was 60.8%.

== Economy ==
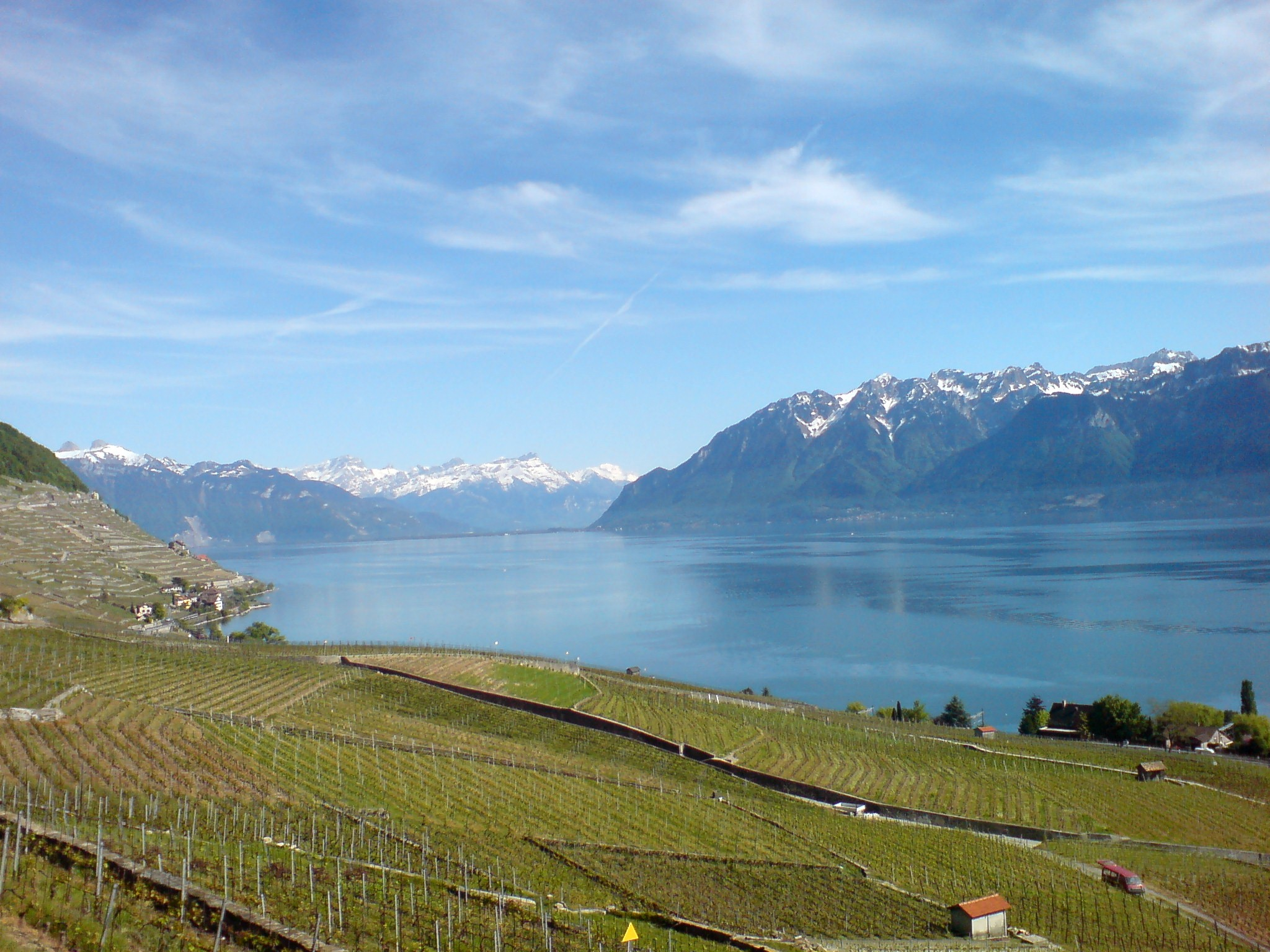
Lavaux vineyards near Riex

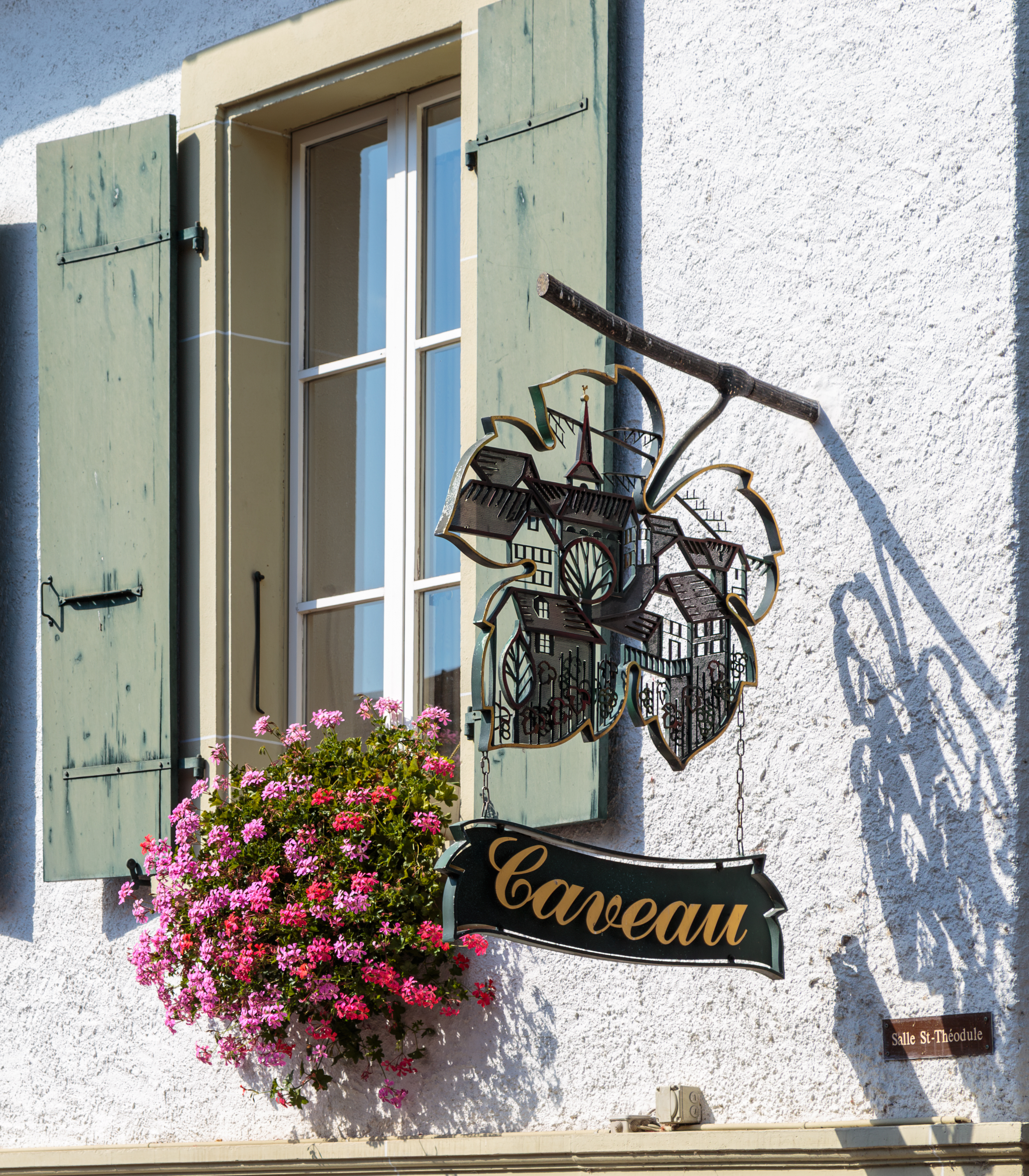
Wine cellar in Riex

As of 2010, Riex had an unemployment rate of 1.7%. As of 2008, there were 39 people employed in the primary economic sector and about 12 businesses involved in this sector. 6 people were employed in the secondary sector and there were 5 businesses in this sector. 38 people were employed in the tertiary sector, with 8 businesses in this sector. There were 154 residents of the municipality who were employed in some capacity, of which females made up 40.3% of the workforce.

In 2008 the total number of full-time equivalent jobs was 61. The number of jobs in the primary sector was 23, all of which were in agriculture. The number of jobs in the secondary sector was 5 of which 2 or (40.0%) were in manufacturing and 3 (60.0%) were in construction. The number of jobs in the tertiary sector was 33. In the tertiary sector; 3 or 9.1% were in the sale or repair of motor vehicles, 6 or 18.2% were in a hotel or restaurant, 3 or 9.1% were technical professionals or scientists, 1 was in education.

In 2000, there were 40 workers who commuted into the municipality and 106 workers who commuted away. The municipality is a net exporter of workers, with about 2.7 workers leaving the municipality for every one entering. Of the working population, 8.4% used public transportation to get to work, and 65.6% used a private car.

== Religion ==
From the 2000 census, 69 or 23.0% were Roman Catholic, while 170 or 56.7% belonged to the Swiss Reformed Church. Of the rest of the population, there were 3 members of an Orthodox church (or about 1.00% of the population), and there were 10 individuals (or about 3.33% of the population) who belonged to another Christian church. 45 (or about 15.00% of the population) belonged to no church, are agnostic or atheist, and 8 individuals (or about 2.67% of the population) did not answer the question.

== Weather ==
Riex has an average of 125.6 days of rain or snow per year and on average receives 1,255 mm (49.4 in) of precipitation. The wettest month is June during which time Riex receives an average of 128 mm (5.0 in) of rain or snow. During this month there is precipitation for an average of 11.4 days. The month with the most days of precipitation is May, with an average of 12.3, but with only 110 mm (4.3 in) of rain or snow. The driest month of the year is February with an average of 85 mm (3.3 in) of precipitation over 10.1 days.

== Education ==
In Riex about 113 or (37.7%) of the population have completed non-mandatory upper secondary education, and 58 or (19.3%) have completed additional higher education (either University or a Fachhochschule). Of the 58 who completed tertiary schooling, 60.3% were Swiss men, 27.6% were Swiss women.

In the 2009/2010 school year there were a total of 32 students in the Riex school district. In the Vaud cantonal school system, two years of non-obligatory pre-school are provided by the political districts. During the school year, the political district provided pre-school care for a total of 665 children of which 232 children (34.9%) received subsidized pre-school care. The canton's primary school program requires students to attend for four years. There were 16 students in the municipal primary school program. The obligatory lower secondary school program lasts for six years and there were 16 students in those schools.

As of 2000, there was one student in Riex who came from another municipality, while 45 residents attended schools outside the municipality.
