= Mont de Gourze =

Mountain in Switzerland

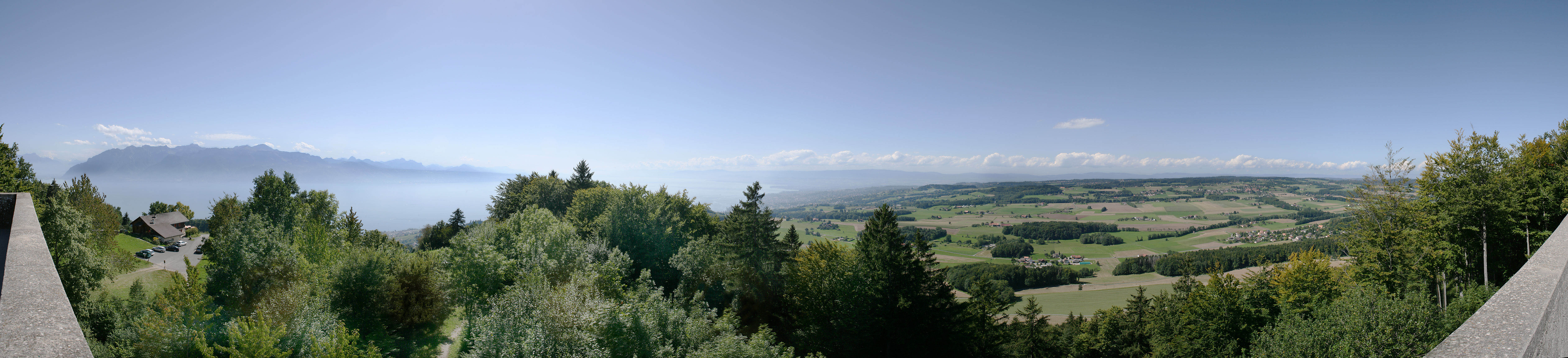
- View from the summit

Highest point
- Elevation: 924 m (3,031 ft)
- Prominence: 204 m (669 ft)
- Parent peak: Montagne du Château
- Coordinates: 46°30′40″N 06°44′26″E

Geography
- Location within Switzerland
- Location: Vaud, Switzerland

Mont de Gourze (924 metres (3,031 ft)) is a mountain in Switzerland, overlooking Lake Geneva in the canton of Vaud.

On the summit is located the medieval lookout tower of Gourze.
