= Tower of Gourze =

- Tour de Gourze
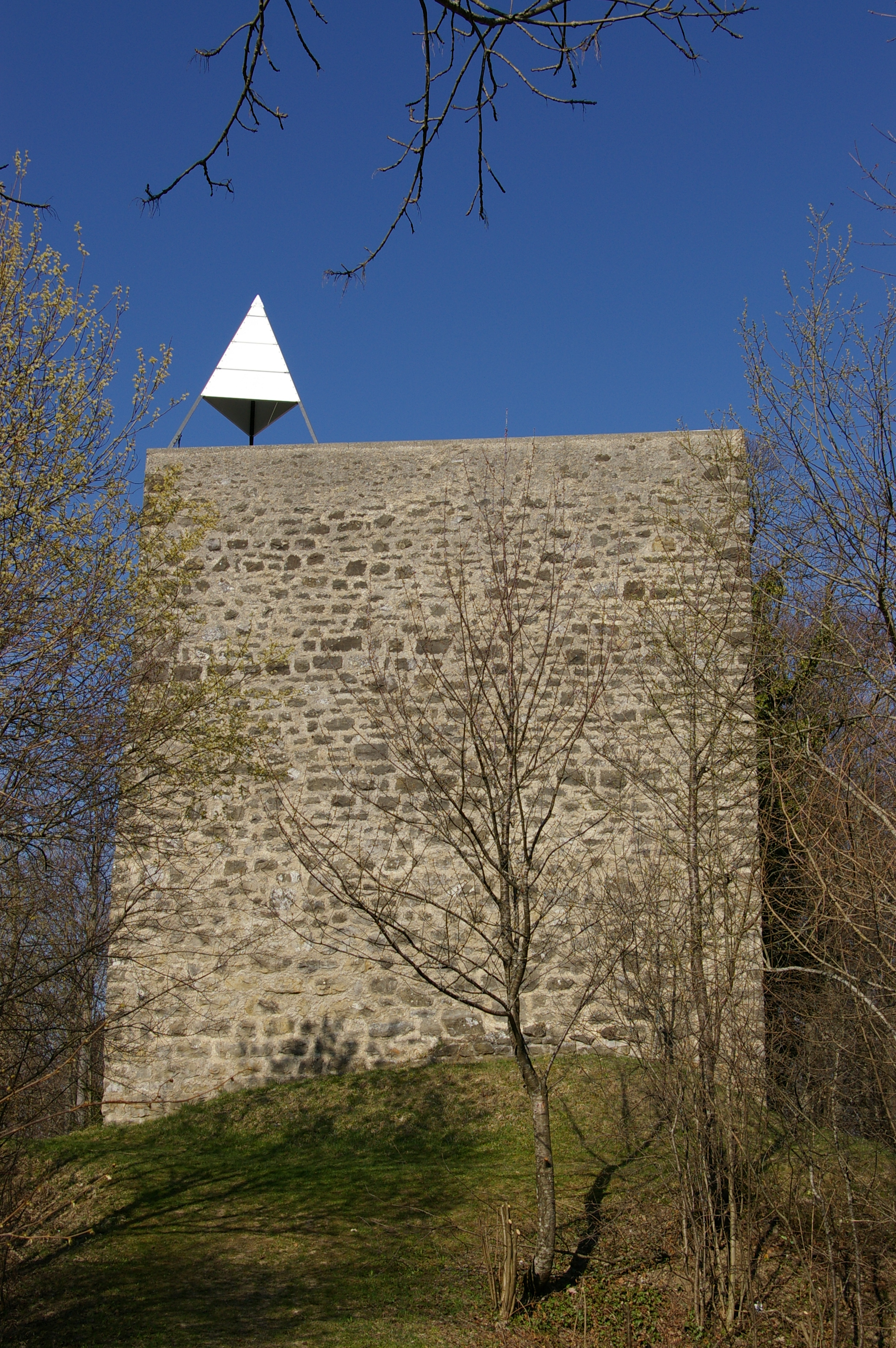
- Photo of the tower
- Interactive map of Tower of Gourze
- Coordinates: 46.5110°N 6.7407°E
- Type: medieval lookout tower
- Material: Stone
- Height: 9 metres (30 ft)

The tower of Gourze is the remnants of a medieval lookout tower on the Mont de Gourze in the Swiss canton of Vaud. A square tower, it is approximately 9 metres (30 ft) tall and has views over Lake Geneva. The tower is open to the public and stairs provide access to the top. A restaurant whose specialty is fondue is located nearby and is named after the tower.

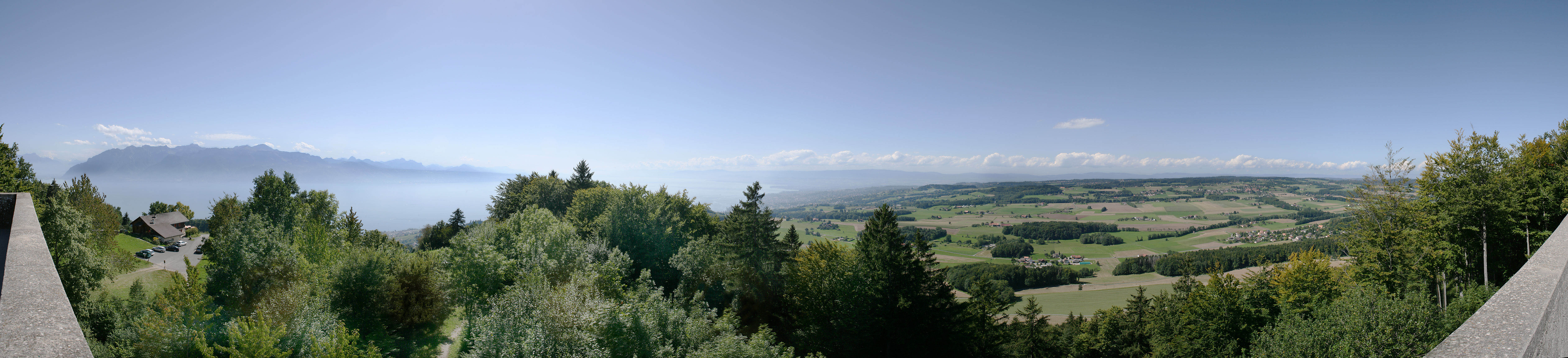
View from the top of the tower

== History ==
Historians do not agree on the exact origin of the tower. Some believe that the tower was built in the 9th century by Queen Berthe of Souabe to protect the Lavaux from the Saracens. Others think that the tower was built at the end of the 11th century by the Bishops of Lausanne. The first mention of the tower in the historical record can be found in a document from 1279 under the Latin name "Castrum Gurzi".

The tower was destroyed by fire in the beginning of the 14th century after a conflict involving the bishops of Lausanne. The tour was rebuilt in 1397 by Guillaume de Menthonay, the bishop of Lausanne. The reconstruction of the tour was managed by Jean de Canturio de Milan whose family owned the tower until 1530 when it was finally sold to the parish of Villette. Only 6 years later, the canton of Bern invaded and took control of the tower. The tower fell into disrepair until 1878 when efforts to restore the tower began. In 1910, the tower became the property of the canton of Vaud. The tower was declared a historical monument by the Swiss federal government on August 6, 1913.

Due to its wide-ranging views of the surrounding area, the tower has been used extensively as a geodetic datum. In 1902, a locating pyramid was placed on the western corner of the tower. The pyramid was used in the official Swiss mensuration national (i.e. MN03). The exact altitude of the top of the pyramid is 936.25 metres (3,071.7 ft) above sea level. In 2005, the pyramid becomes the property of the canton of Vaud and in 2006 it is no longer used due to the rise of GPS.
