= Villarsel-le-Gibloux =

Former municipality, canton of Fribourg

- Former municipality
- Location of Villarsel-le-Gibloux
- Location within Switzerland Location within Canton of Fribourg
- Coordinates: 46.71498°N 7.0168°E
- Country: Switzerland
- Canton: Fribourg
- District: Sarine
- Municipality: Gibloux

Population (2000)
  - Total: 244
- Time zone: UTC+01:00 (CET)
  - Summer (DST): UTC+02:00 (CEST)
- ISO 3166 code: CH-FR
- Website

Villarsel-le-Gibloux (former German name Villarsel am Gibel) is a former municipality in the Sarine district of the canton of Fribourg, Switzerland. From 2003 to 2015 it formed the municipality of Le Glèbe together with Estavayer-le-Gibloux, Rueyres-Saint-Laurent and Villarlod; since 2016 it has been part of the new municipality of Gibloux. It lies on the northern flank of the Gibloux.

== History ==
Villarsel-le-Gibloux is first mentioned in 1278 as Villarsel subtus Giblour. A few Roman remains have been found there. Ruins remain of the castle of the lords of Villarsel, mentioned in 1232, which the Fribourgeois attacked and burned in December 1447.

The northern slope of the Gibloux seems to have belonged to the lordship of Pont, but to have been, at least in part, under the suzerainty of the bishop of Lausanne. The small lordship of Villarsel passed to the Corbières family, who sold their castle to Jocerius d'Oron in 1346. It was owned by Rodolphe de Langin in 1375 and by the Challant family until 1579, then by Christophe Reyff and, in 1606, by Simon Alex. Fribourg's suzerainty over Villarsel was recognized in 1536 and, after being disputed by Bern, finally granted in 1584. Villarsel was part of the bailiwick of Pont-Farvagny, and then of the districts of Romont from 1798 and of Farvagny from 1803 to 1848. It always belonged to the parish of Estavayer-le-Gibloux.

A green molasse quarry was worked from the end of the 19th century. Agriculture consists of milk production and fodder crops. Villarsel-le-Gibloux had 111 inhabitants in 1811, 156 in 1850, 221 in 1900, 186 in 1950, 131 in 1970 and 244 in 2000.

== Bibliography ==
- La Liberté, 22 November 1967; 19 August 1983
- B. de Vevey, Châteaux et maisons fortes du canton de Fribourg, 1978, pp. 313–315

=== Archives ===
- Archives de l'État de Fribourg, Fribourg (card index)
