= Villarlod =

Former municipality, canton of Fribourg

- Former municipality
- Location of Villarlod
- Location within Switzerland Location within Canton of Fribourg
- Coordinates: 46.702778°N 7.022228°E
- Country: Switzerland
- Canton: Fribourg
- District: Sarine
- Municipality: Gibloux

Population (2000)
  - Total: 256
- Time zone: UTC+01:00 (CET)
  - Summer (DST): UTC+02:00 (CEST)
- ISO 3166 code: CH-FR
- Website

Villarlod is a village and former municipality in the Sarine district of the canton of Fribourg, Switzerland. From 2003 to 2015 it formed the municipality of Le Glèbe together with Estavayer-le-Gibloux, Rueyres-Saint-Laurent and Villarsel-le-Gibloux; since 2016 it has been part of the new municipality of Gibloux. The village lies on the northwestern flank of the Gibloux.

== History ==
Villarlod is first mentioned in 1231 as Vilar Aloz. A small fortification of unknown date was discovered there in 1982. Hauterive Abbey inherited much property and many rights in Villarlod from medieval lords, among them Pierre II de Gruyère and Petrus de Chenens. In 1291 Guillaume I de Billens ceded property in Villarlod to the knight Nicolas d'Englisberg.

Linked to the lordship of Pont, Villarlod was part of the Fribourg bailiwick of Pont-Farvagny from 1482, of the district of Romont from 1798 and of that of Farvagny from 1803 to 1848. In church matters, Villarlod separated from Estavayer-le-Gibloux in 1910 to become a parish of its own. The chapel of Saint Michael was built in 1645, and the parish church was consecrated in 1913. Above the village, the Croix du Sault, a cross from 1765 that was rebuilt after 1954, is a place of pilgrimage.

A molasse quarry (Villarlod SA) has been in operation since the 1880s. Agriculture consists of fodder crops and livestock farming. About fifty Polish internees (1940–1945) were employed in agriculture or in draining the marshes.

Villarlod had 117 inhabitants in 1811, 152 in 1850, 225 in 1900, 183 in 1950 and 256 in 2000.

== Bibliography ==
- C. Félix, Molasses et grès de Villarlod, 1977
- M. Meier, A. Perritaz, Villarlod, 1910–1990, 1990
- G. Perritaz, L'infanterie du bon Dieu, 2003, pp. 42–43

=== Archives ===
- Archives de l'État de Fribourg, Fribourg (card index)
