= Estavayer-le-Gibloux =

Former municipality, canton of Fribourg

- Former municipality
- Center of the village

- Coat of arms
- Location of Estavayer-le-Gibloux
- Location within Switzerland Location within Canton of Fribourg
- Coordinates: 46.716671°N 7.03333°E
- Country: Switzerland
- Canton: Fribourg
- District: Sarine
- Municipality: Gibloux

Population (2000)
  - Total: 150
- Time zone: UTC+01:00 (CET)
  - Summer (DST): UTC+02:00 (CEST)
- ISO 3166 code: CH-FR
- Website

Estavayer-le-Gibloux (former German name Stäffis am Gibel) is a village and former municipality in the Sarine district of the canton of Fribourg, Switzerland. From 2003 to 2015 it formed the municipality of Le Glèbe together with Rueyres-Saint-Laurent, Villarlod and Villarsel-le-Gibloux; since 2016 it has been part of the new municipality of Gibloux. The village lies away from the main roads.

== History ==
Estavayer-le-Gibloux is first mentioned between 1157 and 1162 as Estavaiet and in 1227 as Staviolum sous Jublor. A Roman villa was discovered there in 1903.

Estavayer-le-Gibloux belonged to the lordship of Pont. It was incorporated into the bailiwick of Pont in 1482 and into that of Farvagny in 1617, and then into the districts of Romont in 1798 and of Farvagny in 1803. The Billens family, the counts of Gruyère, the Notre-Dame hospital and the Grande Confrérie (great confraternity) of Fribourg owned the tithe of Estavayer-le-Gibloux.

The parish, mentioned in 1228 (a parish priest is mentioned between 1157 and 1162), included Rueyres-Saint-Laurent, Villarsel and Villarlod. In 1513 it was incorporated into the chapter of Saint Nicholas, which exercised the advowson (droit de collation), held in the 15th century by the bishop of Lausanne. The church of Saint Clement, mentioned in 1227, was rebuilt from 1842 to 1847.

The village has kept its rural character, with livestock farming and fodder crops; in 2000 more than a quarter of the jobs it offered were in the primary sector. Estavayer-le-Gibloux had 153 inhabitants in 1672, 178 in 1811, 244 in 1850, 260 in 1900, 313 in 1920, 263 in 1950, 118 in 1990 and 150 in 2000.

== Bibliography ==
- A. Dellion, Dictionnaire historique et statistique des paroisses catholiques du canton de Fribourg, vol. 5–6, pp. 98–117
