= Rueyres-Saint-Laurent =

Former municipality, canton of Fribourg

- Former municipality
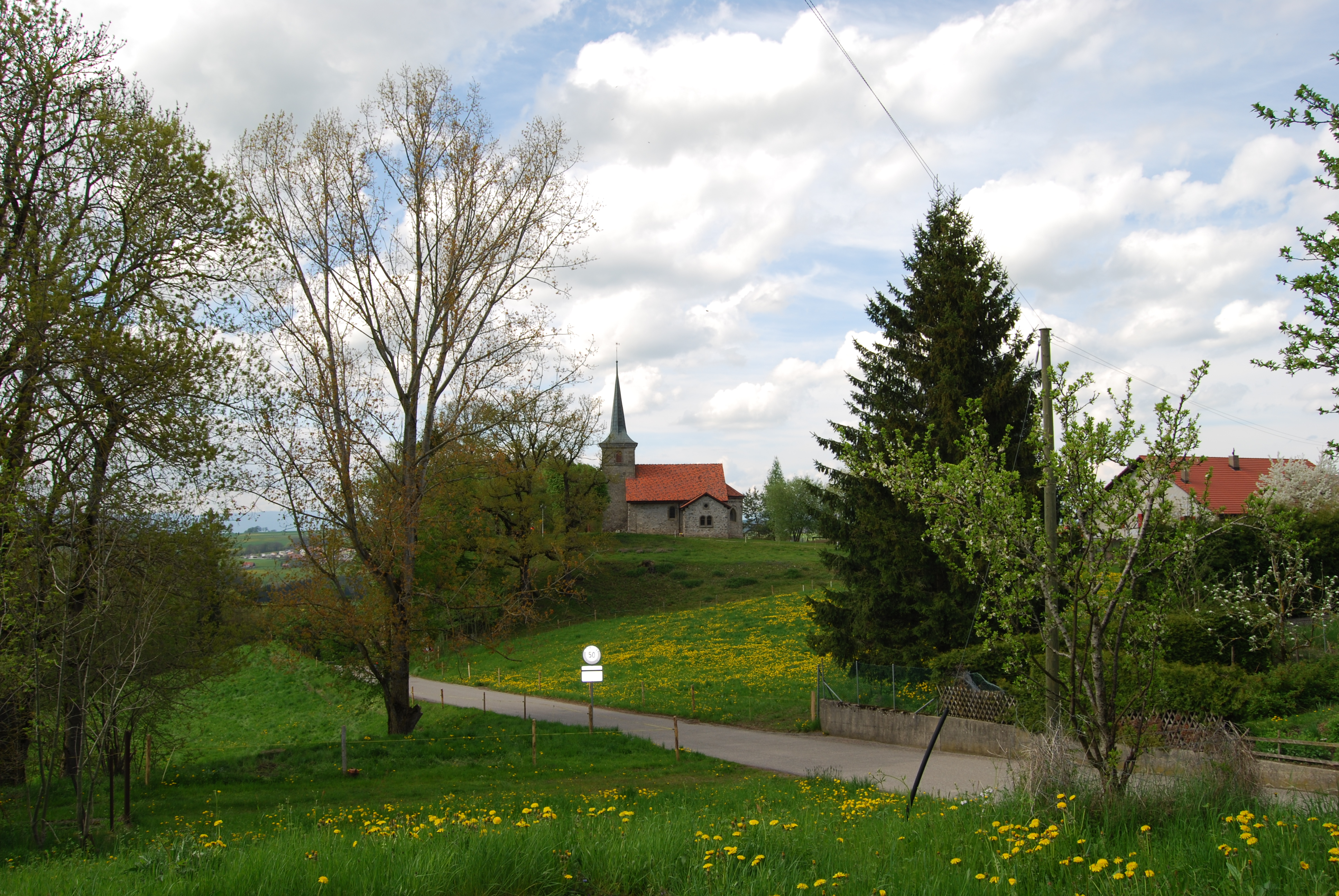
- Chapel of Saint Lawrence
- Location of Rueyres-Saint-Laurent
- Location within Switzerland Location within Canton of Fribourg
- Coordinates: 46.716671°N 7.03333°E
- Country: Switzerland
- Canton: Fribourg
- District: Sarine
- Municipality: Gibloux

Population (2000)
  - Total: 262
- Time zone: UTC+01:00 (CET)
  - Summer (DST): UTC+02:00 (CEST)
- ISO 3166 code: CH-FR
- Website

Rueyres-Saint-Laurent (former German name Rueyres-St. Lorenz) is a village and former municipality in the Sarine district of the canton of Fribourg, Switzerland. From 2003 to 2015 it formed the municipality of Le Glèbe together with Estavayer-le-Gibloux, Villarlod and Villarsel-le-Gibloux; since 2016 it has been part of the new municipality of Gibloux. The village lies on the western slope of the Gibloux.

== History ==
Rueyres-Saint-Laurent is first mentioned in 1175 as apud Rivoriam. In the Middle Ages it formed a lordship. In the 13th and 14th centuries Hauterive Abbey, the lords of Pont, the Englisberg and Bennwil families and the citizens' hospital (hôpital des Bourgeois) of Fribourg acquired property there.

Fribourg obtained sovereignty over Rueyres-Saint-Laurent in 1482. The village then belonged to the bailiwick of Pont-Farvagny (1482–1798), and then to the districts of Romont (1798–1803), Farvagny (1803–1848) and Sarine (from 1848). It always belonged to the parish of Estavayer-le-Gibloux. The chapel, dedicated to Saint Lawrence, dates from the 12th and 13th centuries.

A fire destroyed part of the village in 1900. Rueyres-Saint-Laurent has kept its rural character, with livestock farming and cereal growing. It had 184 inhabitants in 1811, 220 in 1850, 231 in 1900, 224 in 1950 and 262 in 2000.

== Bibliography ==
- A. Dellion, Dictionnaire historique et statistique des paroisses catholiques du canton de Fribourg, vol. 5, pp. 103–108
- G. Bourquenoud, "Rueyres-Saint-Laurent", in Fribourg illustré, 1992, no. 8–9, pp. 33–37
