= Farvagny-le-Grand =

Former municipality, canton of Fribourg

- Former municipality
- Church of Saint Vincent
- Location of Farvagny-le-Grand
- Location within Switzerland Location within Canton of Fribourg
- Coordinates: 46.7209°N 7.0648°E
- Country: Switzerland
- Canton: Fribourg
- District: Sarine
- Municipality: Gibloux

Population (1990)
  - Total: 905
- Time zone: UTC+01:00 (CET)
  - Summer (DST): UTC+02:00 (CEST)
- ISO 3166 code: CH-FR
- Website

Farvagny-le-Grand (former German name Grossfavernach) is a village and former municipality in the Sarine district of the canton of Fribourg, Switzerland. From 1996 to 2015 it formed the municipality of Farvagny together with Farvagny-le-Petit, Grenilles and Posat; since 2016 it has been part of the new municipality of Gibloux. It is a livestock-farming village in the Prealps, north of Mont Gibloux.

== History ==
Farvagny-le-Grand is first mentioned in 1082 as Faverneis. It belonged to the lordship of Pont, which was a fief of the House of Savoy from 1250 and was bought by the city of Fribourg in 1483. From 1483 Farvagny-le-Grand was part of the bailiwick of Pont-Farvagny, and in 1617, after the castle of Pont had fallen into ruin, it became the seat of the bailiwick. From 1617 to 1625 the courthouse, which was the residence of the bailiff, was converted into a castle (with the coats of arms of Fribourg and of the bailiff Gibach). The customary law of Moudon applied until 1655, when it was replaced by the law of Fribourg (the Municipale).

The parish existed before 1082. In 1177 it came under the canons of the Great St Bernard, who had a priory at Farvagny-le-Grand, mentioned in 1228. At the end of the 16th century the advowson (collation) passed to the chapter of Saint Nicholas in Fribourg. The first public school opened in 1726.

During the French invasion of 1798, the bailiff François-Jacques-Nicolas de Müller remained loyal to Fribourg, and the population resisted the new regime. The castle and its estate were sold at public auction in 1801. Under the Helvetic Republic, Farvagny-le-Grand was attached to the district of Romont; from 1803 to 1848 it was the seat of the district of Farvagny, which comprised nineteen municipalities. The prefecture was then abolished, and Farvagny-le-Grand became part of the Sarine district.

A fulling mill is recorded in 1291. In the 19th century artificial meadows and dairy farming developed, while straw plaiting was already in decline in 1842. In 1834 the parish, which comprised Farvagny-le-Grand, Farvagny-le-Petit, Posat and Grenilles, had fifty people on poor relief. The present church, built in 1888 and dedicated to Saint Vincent the Deacon, replaced an 11th-century building. Until 1920 the village kept the separation between communiers (local citizens) and habitants (residents). The municipal tax was introduced in 1923. From 1916 to 1932 an electric trolleybus ran between Fribourg and Farvagny-le-Grand. A secondary school opened in 1975. Since the opening of the A12 motorway, Farvagny-le-Grand has again been gaining importance as a regional center (a library in 1989, a medical care home in 1991, and a shopping center).

Farvagny-le-Grand had 223 inhabitants in 1811, 343 in 1850, 433 in 1900, 453 in 1950, 613 in 1980 and 905 in 1990.

== Bibliography ==
- A. Dellion, Dictionnaire historique et statistique des paroisses catholiques du canton de Fribourg, vol. 5, pp. 239–271
- B. Bovet, "Farvagny-le-Grand, un peu d'histoire", in Bulletin communal, May 1986 – November 1988
