= Farvagny-le-Petit =

Former municipality, canton of Fribourg

- Former municipality
- Location of Farvagny-le-Petit
- Location within Switzerland Location within Canton of Fribourg
- Coordinates: 46.7283°N 7.0726°E
- Country: Switzerland
- Canton: Fribourg
- District: Sarine
- Municipality: Gibloux

Population (1990)
  - Total: 221
- Time zone: UTC+01:00 (CET)
  - Summer (DST): UTC+02:00 (CEST)
- ISO 3166 code: CH-FR
- Website

Farvagny-le-Petit (former German name Kleinfavernach) is a village and former municipality in the Sarine district of the canton of Fribourg, Switzerland. From 1996 to 2015 it formed the municipality of Farvagny together with Farvagny-le-Grand, Grenilles and Posat; since 2016 it has been part of the new municipality of Gibloux.

== History ==
Farvagny-le-Petit is first mentioned in 1275 as Petit Farvagnie and in 1294 as Favernie lo Pitet. There are three Hallstatt-period burial mounds (tumuli). Farvagny-le-Petit, whose history followed that of Farvagny-le-Grand, was part of the lordship of Pont before it was sold to the great hospital of Fribourg in 1314. The Billens, Langin, d'Affry, Praroman and Wild families and the monasteries of Hauterive and Humilimont owned property in Farvagny-le-Petit.

From 1483 Farvagny-le-Petit belonged to the bailiwick of Pont-Farvagny, which became the bailiwick of Farvagny (1617–1798), and then to the districts of Romont (1798–1803) and Farvagny (1804–1848). In church matters it belongs to the parish of Farvagny-le-Grand. The chapel of Saint Claude, rebuilt in 1671, was replaced by a larger building in 1709.

Peat bogs were worked from 1939 to 1945. Livestock farming and fodder crops are practiced. Since 1979 the opening of the A12 motorway has favored residential development.

Farvagny-le-Petit had 96 inhabitants in 1811, 150 in 1850, 167 in 1900, 190 in 1950 and 221 in 1990.

== Bibliography ==
- Freiburger Nachrichten, 11 May 1994
