= Grenilles =

Former municipality, canton of Fribourg

- Former municipality
- Location of Grenilles
- Location within Switzerland Location within Canton of Fribourg
- Coordinates: 46.7267°N 7.0506°E
- Country: Switzerland
- Canton: Fribourg
- District: Sarine
- Municipality: Gibloux

Population (1990)
  - Total: 93
- Time zone: UTC+01:00 (CET)
  - Summer (DST): UTC+02:00 (CEST)
- SFOS number: 2199
- ISO 3166 code: CH-FR
- Website

Grenilles is a village and former municipality in the Sarine district of the canton of Fribourg, Switzerland. From 1996 to 2015 it formed the municipality of Farvagny together with Farvagny-le-Grand, Farvagny-le-Petit and Posat; since 2016 it has been part of the new municipality of Gibloux. It lies northeast of Mont Gibloux.

== History ==
Grenilles is first mentioned in 929 as Granecglis. Remains of a Hallstatt-period fortification have been found there. In 929 the Abbey of Saint-Maurice granted Turimbert the usufruct of its lands at Grenilles. In the 12th and 13th centuries the lordship of Grenilles was held by the family of the same name; Guillaume, mentioned from 1163 to 1180, was a benefactor of Hauterive Abbey. In 1304 Conrad de Pont sold the lordship to Pierre Rich, whose family still owned property in Grenilles in 1421.

Acquired by Fribourg in 1441, Grenilles was part of Fribourg's Old Lands (Anciennes Terres), in the banner of La Neuveville (bannière de La Neuveville), until 1798, and then of the district of Farvagny until 1848. It has always belonged to the parish of Farvagny. In 1563 a fire destroyed many houses. The village has kept its farming character, with livestock farming and cereal and fodder crops.

Grenilles had 128 inhabitants in 1811, 103 in 1870, 137 in 1920, 81 in 1980 and 93 in 1990.
