= Posat =

Posat may refer to:

- PoSAT-1, the first Portuguese satellite, launched in 1993
- Posat, Fribourg, a village and former municipality in the canton of Fribourg, Switzerland
