= Villars-d'Avry =

Former municipality, canton of Fribourg

- Former municipality
- Location of Villars-d'Avry
- Location within Switzerland Location within Canton of Fribourg
- Coordinates: 46.6944°N 7.0789°E
- Country: Switzerland
- Canton: Fribourg
- District: Gruyère
- Municipality: Pont-en-Ogoz

Population (1960)
  - Total: 33
- Time zone: UTC+01:00 (CET)
  - Summer (DST): UTC+02:00 (CEST)
- SFOS number: 2157
- ISO 3166 code: CH-FR
- Website

Villars-d'Avry (former German name Wiler ob Avry) is a former municipality in the Gruyère district of the canton of Fribourg, Switzerland. In 1970 it merged with the former municipality of Pont-en-Ogoz to form the municipality of Le Bry, which has been part of the new municipality of Pont-en-Ogoz since 2003. It lies on the foothills of the Gibloux.

== History ==
Villars-d'Avry formerly belonged to the lordship of Pont. The de Menthon family held this land in the 15th century, until 1465. Villars-d'Avry is part of the parish of Avry-devant-Pont. A chapel dedicated to the Virgin under the title of the Visitation was consecrated in 1793. At the beginning of the 21st century agriculture (fodder crops and cattle breeding) still played an important part.

Villars-d'Avry had 88 inhabitants in 1850, 72 in 1900, 43 in 1950 and 33 in 1960.

== Bibliography ==
- C. Fontaine, "Villars-d'Avry", in Le vieux chalet, 101, 1962, pp. 801–804
- C. Morard, Villars-d'Avry, manuscript, Collège Saint-Michel, Fribourg, 1982
