= Posat, Fribourg =

Former municipality, canton of Fribourg

Posat
- Former municipality
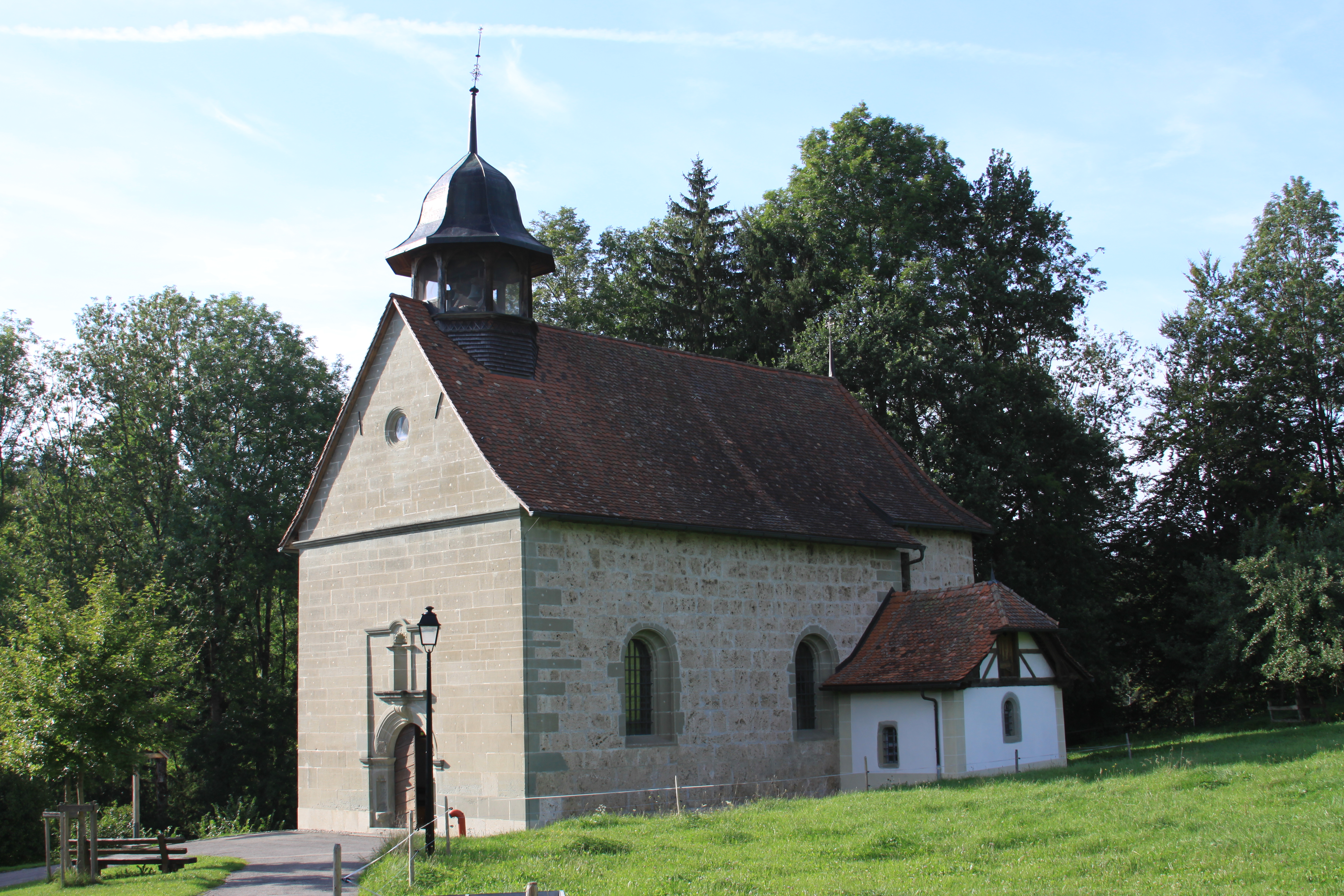
- Chapel of Notre-Dame

- Coat of arms
- Location of Posat
- Location within Switzerland Location within Canton of Fribourg
- Coordinates: 46.7360°N 7.0556°E
- Country: Switzerland
- Canton: Fribourg
- District: Sarine
- Municipality: Gibloux

Population (1990)
  - Total: 73
- Time zone: UTC+01:00 (CET)
  - Summer (DST): UTC+02:00 (CEST)
- ISO 3166 code: CH-FR
- Website

Posat is a village and former municipality in the Sarine district of the canton of Fribourg, Switzerland. From 1996 to 2015 it formed the municipality of Farvagny together with Farvagny-le-Grand, Farvagny-le-Petit and Grenilles; since 2016 it has been part of the new municipality of Gibloux. It lies on the right bank of the Glâne.

== History ==
Posat is first mentioned in 1148 as Vilar Aldiert and in 1179 as Posat. It was owned by the lords of Pont until 1482. Between 1137 and 1148 Pierre de Pont and his brothers gave a large part of the land at Posat to the Premonstratensian Humilimont Abbey, so that a farm and a chapel could be built there. Premonstratensian sisters who had moved from Humilimont had their priory at Posat from about 1140/1148 until after 1179. Humilimont bought the feudal jurisdiction over Posat from the lords of Pont. From 1420 the monks leased their estate at Posat to tenants. After Humilimont was dissolved in 1580, the church and the possessions at Posat passed to the Jesuits of the Collège Saint-Michel in Fribourg.

Posat was part of the bailiwick of Farvagny from 1482, and then of the districts of Fribourg (1798) and Farvagny until 1848. It has always belonged to the parish of Farvagny. The priory chapel was rebuilt by the Jesuits in 1675 and dedicated to Our Lady (Notre-Dame). From the 18th century it became a place of pilgrimage to the Virgin Mary, later also associated with the Capuchin Apollinaire Morel, a native of Posat, who was killed in the September Massacres in Paris in 1792. French Trappists took refuge in Posat from 1830 to 1831.

The village has kept its farming character, with livestock farming and fodder crops. A first attempt to merge with Grenilles failed in 1981.

Posat had 72 inhabitants in 1811, 86 in 1850, 113 in 1900, 95 in 1950 and 73 in 1990.

== Bibliography ==
- A. Dellion, Dictionnaire historique et statistique des paroisses catholiques du canton de Fribourg, vol. 5–6, pp. 261–266
- La Liberté, 19 January 1989 and 3 July 1993
- Helvetia Sacra, III/3, pp. 1070–1071; IV/3, pp. 445–449
- La chapelle de Posat restaurée, 2005
