= Vuisternens =

Vuisternens may refer to:

- Vuisternens-devant-Romont, canton of Fribourg, Switzerland
- Vuisternens-en-Ogoz, canton of Fribourg, Switzerland
