= Gumefens =

Former municipality, canton of Fribourg

- Former municipality
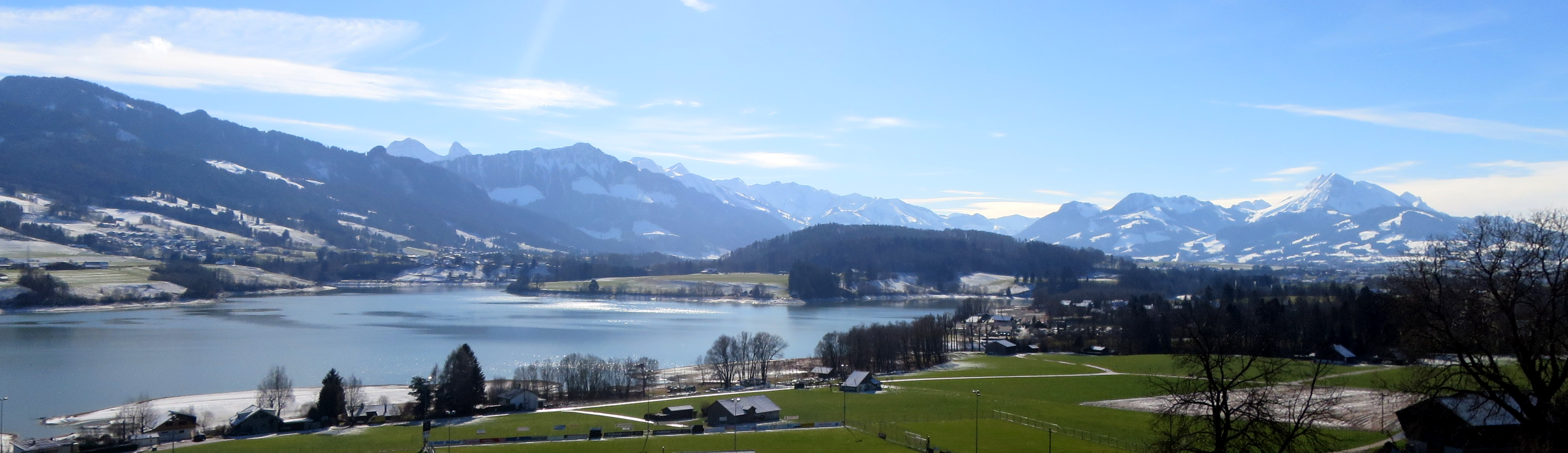
- The Lake of Gruyère from near Gumefens
- Location of Gumefens
- Location within Switzerland Location within Canton of Fribourg
- Coordinates: 46.6781°N 7.0729°E
- Country: Switzerland
- Canton: Fribourg
- District: Gruyère
- Municipality: Pont-en-Ogoz

Population (2000)
  - Total: 652
- Time zone: UTC+01:00 (CET)
  - Summer (DST): UTC+02:00 (CEST)
- ISO 3166 code: CH-FR
- Website

Gumefens is a former municipality in the Gruyère district of the canton of Fribourg, Switzerland. In 2003 it merged with Avry-devant-Pont and Le Bry to form the new municipality of Pont-en-Ogoz. It lies on the cantonal road from Bulle to Fribourg along the left bank of the Lake of Gruyère.

== History ==
Gumefens is first mentioned in 1298 as Gugmufens and in 1307 as Gumuffens. Two rich cemeteries of the early and middle La Tène period have been discovered at Gumefens, at the sites of Pra-Perrey and Sus-Fey: warriors' graves contained weapons (sword, spear), and women's burials contained jewelry (fibulae, rings, and bracelets of iron, bronze and glass). A Gallo-Roman settlement is recorded at Villarvassaux, and an early medieval cemetery at Sus-Fey.

In 1263 Peter II of Savoy received the land of Gumefens from Ulrich de Vuippens and enfeoffed it to the Everdes-Vuippens family. From 1325 Gumefens belonged to the lordship of Vuippens; it then became part of the bailiwick of Vuippens (1549–1798), of the district of Farvagny (1798–1848) and finally of the Gruyère district. Its chapel, built in 1618 and dedicated to Saint John the Baptist, belongs to the parish of Avry-devant-Pont.

From 1979 the opening of the A12 motorway brought improvements to the village's road network, the arrival of new businesses (electrical work, joinery and cabinetmaking, masonry) and residential and tourist development. On the shore of the Lake of Gruyère, Gumefens has one of the five camping and caravan sites of southern Fribourg, and it belongs to the Société de développement du lac de la Gruyère (Lake of Gruyère development society). At the beginning of the 21st century only a few farming families (pig breeding) remained in the formerly rural commune, and nearly half of the working population was employed in the tertiary sector.

Gumefens had 215 inhabitants in 1800, 396 in 1850, 467 in 1900, 367 in 1950 and 652 in 2000.

== Bibliography ==
- H. Schwab, RN 12 et archéologie, 1981, pp. 15–20
- A. Dupraz, Gumefens, 1984
