= Le Bry =

Former municipality, canton of Fribourg

- Former municipality
- Aerial view (1963)

- Coat of arms
- Location of Le Bry
- Location within Switzerland Location within Canton of Fribourg
- Coordinates: 46.699998°N 7.083337°E
- Country: Switzerland
- Canton: Fribourg
- District: Gruyère
- Municipality: Pont-en-Ogoz

Population (2000)
  - Total: 274
- Time zone: UTC+01:00 (CET)
  - Summer (DST): UTC+02:00 (CEST)
- ISO 3166 code: CH-FR
- Website

Le Bry is a former municipality in the Gruyère district of the canton of Fribourg, Switzerland. In 2003 it merged with Avry-devant-Pont and Gumefens to form the new municipality of Pont-en-Ogoz. It lies on the motorway from Fribourg to Bulle, on the shore of the Lake of Gruyère.

== History ==
Le Bry was a hamlet of the former municipality of Pont-en-Ogoz. In 1970 it became a municipality, formed by the merger of Pont-en-Ogoz and Villars-d'Avry. There are remains of a Gallo-Roman settlement of the 2nd and 3rd centuries and a rich early medieval cemetery at the site of Le Bry-La Chavanne.

Le Bry belonged to the lordship of Pont, with its 12th-century castle and former small town (bourg) in a meander of the Sarine. In 1482 the lordship was sold to Fribourg and became the canton's first bailiwick; in 1798 it was attached to the district of Bulle. Le Bry is part of the parish of Avry-devant-Pont.

Fodder crops are grown and cattle are raised. Part of the land was flooded by the Lake of Gruyère in 1948. From 1990 tourist facilities were built, with a harbor, a leisure area and a residential zone. As late as 1990 more than a quarter of the working population was employed in the primary sector. A gravel pit was worked from 1957 to 1990. The Distillerie Morard SA was founded in 1957.

Le Bry had 216 inhabitants in 1970 and 274 in 2000.

== Bibliography ==
- O. Wey and A.-F. Auberson Fasel, "Das frühmittelalterliche Gräberfeld von Le Bry-La Chavanne FR", in Archäologie der Schweiz, 15, 1992, pp. 100–108
