= Le Glèbe =

- Former municipality
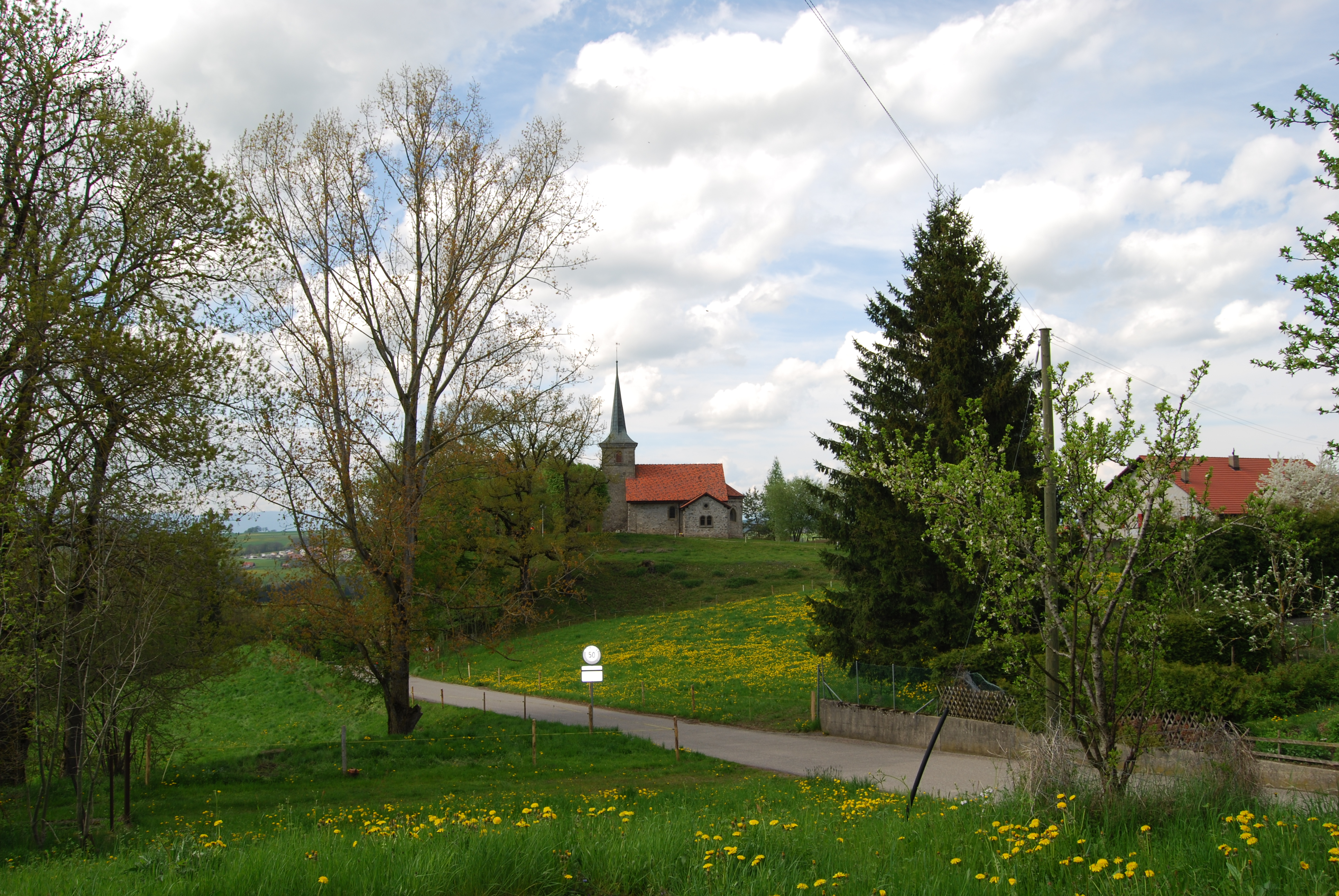

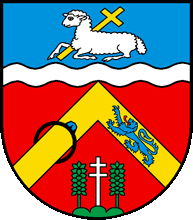
- Coat of arms
- Location of Le Glèbe
- Location within Switzerland Location within Canton of Fribourg
- Coordinates: 46°43′N 7°2′E
- Country: Switzerland
- Canton: Fribourg
- District: Sarine

Government
  - Mayor: Syndic

Area
  - Total: 10.31 km^{2} (3.98 sq mi)

Population (Dec 2014)
  - Total: 1,246
  - Density: 120.9/km^{2} (313.0/sq mi)
- Time zone: UTC+01:00 (CET)
  - Summer (DST): UTC+02:00 (CEST)
- Postal code: 1695
- SFOS number: 2223
- ISO 3166 code: CH-FR
- Surrounded by: Autigny, Farvagny, Pont-en-Ogoz, Sorens, Villorsonnens, Vuisternens-en-Ogoz
- Website: commune-gibloux.ch

Le Glèbe (French: [lə ɡlɛb]; Arpitan: Le Gllèbe) is a former municipality in the district of Sarine in the canton of Fribourg in Switzerland. It was created on 1 January 2003 by the union of Estavayer-le-Gibloux, Rueyres-Saint-Laurent, Villarlod, and Villarsel-le-Gibloux. On 1 January 2016 it merged with Corpataux-Magnedens, Farvagny, Rossens and Vuisternens-en-Ogoz to form the new municipality of Gibloux.

== Geography ==
Le Glèbe had an area, as of 2009, of 10.4 square kilometers (4.0 mi^{2}). Of this area, 7.5 km^{2} (2.9 mi^{2}) or 72.3% is used for agricultural purposes, while 1.96 km^{2} (0.76 mi^{2}) or 18.9% is forested. Of the rest of the land, 0.85 km^{2} (0.33 mi^{2}) or 8.2% is settled (buildings or roads).

Of the built up area, housing and buildings made up 4.3% and transportation infrastructure made up 2.7%. Out of the forested land, 17.0% of the total land area is heavily forested and 1.9% is covered with orchards or small clusters of trees. Of the agricultural land, 40.5% is used for growing crops and 28.0% is pastures and 3.2% is used for alpine pastures.

== Demographics ==
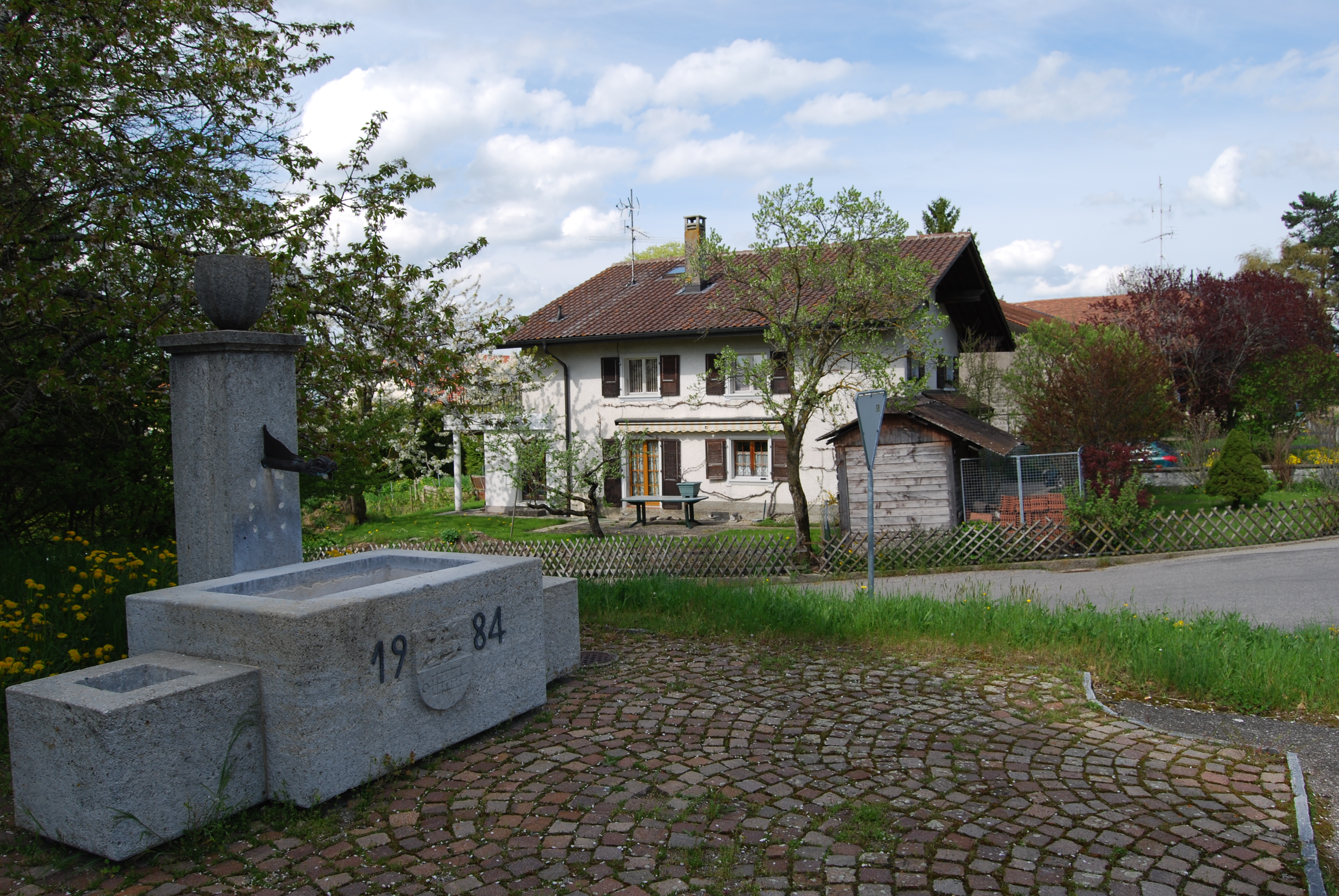
House and fountain in Rueyres-Saint-Laurent

Le Glèbe had a population (as of 2014) of 1,246. As of 2008, 7.6% of the population are resident foreign nationals. Over the last 10 years (2000–2010) the population has changed at a rate of 23.5%. Migration accounted for 18.3%, while births and deaths accounted for 6.4%.

Most of the population (as of 2000) speaks French (248 or 94.7%) as their first language, German is the second most common (7 or 2.7%) and Portuguese is the third (3 or 1.1%). There are 2 people who speak Italian.

As of 2008, the population was 51.4% male and 48.6% female. The population was made up of 521 Swiss men (46.9% of the population) and 50 (4.5%) non-Swiss men. There were 507 Swiss women (45.6%) and 33 (3.0%) non-Swiss women. Of the population in the municipality, 112 or about 42.7% were born in Le Glèbe and lived there in 2000. There were 108 or 41.2% who were born in the same canton, while 28 or 10.7% were born somewhere else in Switzerland, and 14 or 5.3% were born outside of Switzerland.

As of 2000, children and teenagers (0–19 years old) make up 30.4% of the population, while adults (20–64 years old) make up 58.7% and seniors (over 64 years old) make up 11%.

As of 2000, there were 107 people who were single and never married in the municipality. There were 131 married individuals, 13 widows or widowers and 11 individuals who are divorced.

As of 2000, there were 332 private households in the municipality, and an average of 2.7 persons per household. There were 19 households that consist of only one person and 14 households with five or more people. In 2000, a total of 89 apartments (90.8% of the total) were permanently occupied, while 3 apartments (3.1%) were seasonally occupied and 6 apartments (6.1%) were empty. As of 2009, the construction rate of new housing units was 5.4 new units per 1000 residents. The vacancy rate for the municipality, in 2010, was 0.23%.

The historical population is given in the following chart:

== Politics ==
In the 2011 federal election the most popular party was the SVP which received 24.4% of the vote. The next three most popular parties were the SPS (21.9%), the CVP (17.2%) and the CSP (14.8%).

The SVP received about the same percentage of the vote as they did in the 2007 Federal election (26.6% in 2007 vs 24.4% in 2011). The SPS moved from third in 2007 (with 18.9%) to second in 2011, the CVP moved from second in 2007 (with 21.0%) to third and the CSP moved from below fourth place in 2007 to fourth. A total of 403 votes were cast in this election, of which 10 or 2.5% were invalid.

== Economy ==
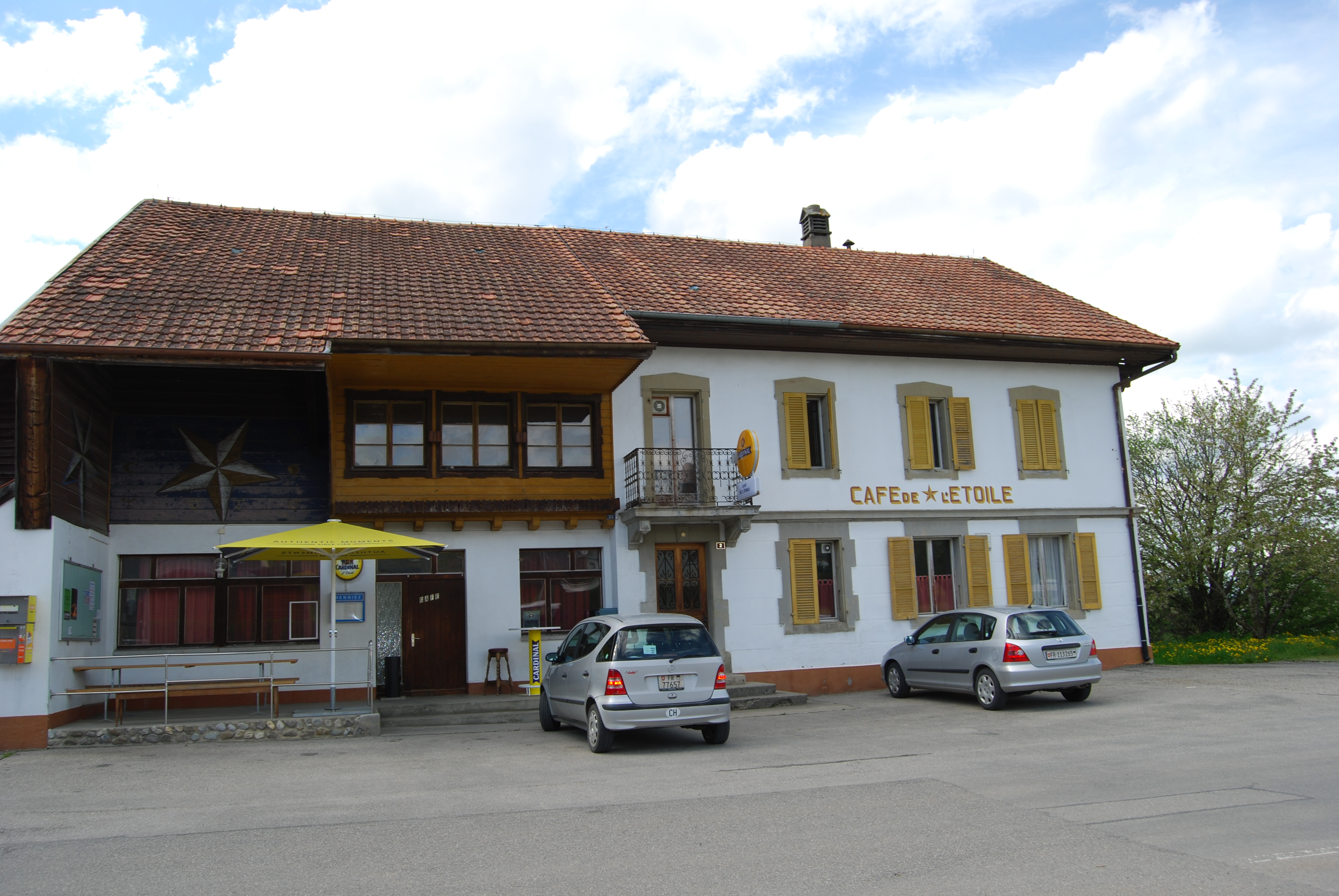
Cafe de l'Etoile in Rueyres-Saint-Laurent village

As of 2010, Le Glèbe had an unemployment rate of 1.3%. As of 2008, there were 76 people employed in the primary economic sector and about 30 businesses involved in this sector. 76 people were employed in the secondary sector and there were 8 businesses in this sector. 59 people were employed in the tertiary sector, with 20 businesses in this sector. There were 142 residents of the municipality who were employed in some capacity, of which females made up 38.7% of the workforce.

In 2008 the total number of full-time equivalent jobs was 176. The number of jobs in the primary sector was 57, all of which were in agriculture. The number of jobs in the secondary sector was 73 of which 3 or (4.1%) were in manufacturing, 5 or (6.8%) were in mining and 65 (89.0%) were in construction. The number of jobs in the tertiary sector was 46. In the tertiary sector; 13 or 28.3% were in wholesale or retail sales or the repair of motor vehicles, 11 or 23.9% were in the movement and storage of goods, 3 or 6.5% were in a hotel or restaurant, 7 or 15.2% were technical professionals or scientists, 8 or 17.4% were in education.

In 2000, there were 24 workers who commuted into the municipality and 109 workers who commuted away. The municipality is a net exporter of workers, with about 4.5 workers leaving the municipality for every one entering. Of the working population, 4.4% used public transportation to get to work, and 75.9% used a private car.

== Religion ==
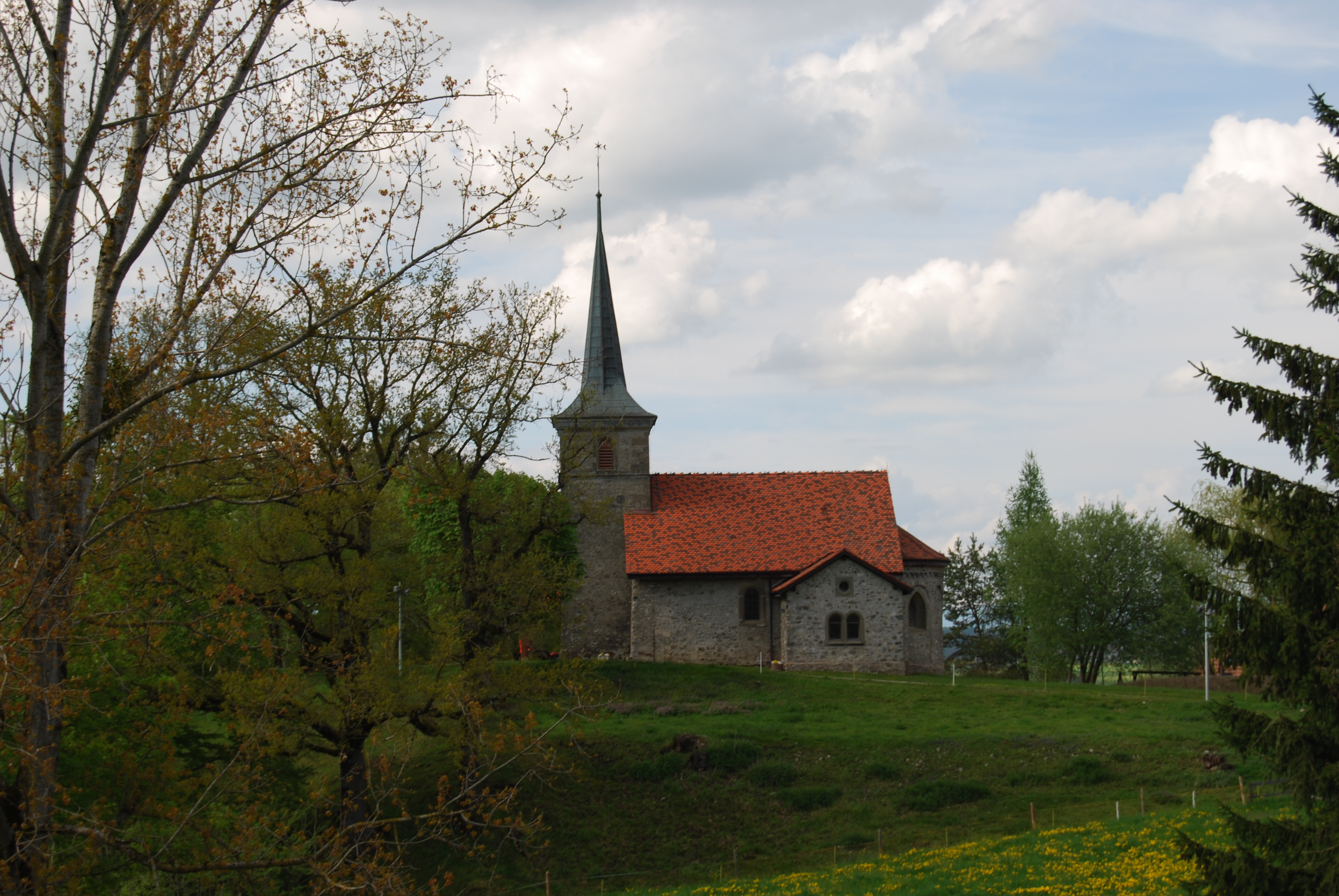
Chapelle Saint-Laurent in Rueyres-Saint-Laurent village

From the 2000 census, 237 or 90.5% were Roman Catholic, while 1 or 0.4% belonged to the Swiss Reformed Church. Of the rest of the population, there was 1 member of an Orthodox church. There were 2 (or about 0.76% of the population) who were Islamic. 21 (or about 8.02% of the population) belonged to no church, are agnostic or atheist.

== Education ==
In Le Glèbe about 75 or (28.6%) of the population have completed non-mandatory upper secondary education, and 31 or (11.8%) have completed additional higher education (either university or a Fachhochschule). Of the 31 who completed tertiary schooling, 71.0% were Swiss men, 25.8% were Swiss women.

The Canton of Fribourg school system provides one year of non-obligatory Kindergarten, followed by six years of Primary school. This is followed by three years of obligatory lower Secondary school where the students are separated according to ability and aptitude. Following the lower Secondary students may attend a three or four year optional upper Secondary school. The upper Secondary school is divided into gymnasium (university preparatory) and vocational programs. After they finish the upper Secondary program, students may choose to attend a Tertiary school or continue their apprenticeship.

During the 2010–11 school year, a total of 126 students attended 7 classes in Le Glèbe. A total of 254 students from the municipality attended any school, either in the municipality or outside of it. There were 2 kindergarten classes with a total of 32 students in the municipality. The municipality had 5 primary classes and 94 students. During the same year, there were no lower secondary classes in the municipality, but 56 students attended lower secondary school in a neighboring municipality. There were no upper Secondary classes or vocational classes, but there were 26 upper Secondary students and 33 upper Secondary vocational students who attended classes in another municipality. The municipality had no non-university Tertiary classes, but there were 5 non-university Tertiary students and 8 specialized Tertiary students who attended classes in another municipality.

As of 2000, there were 13 students in Le Glèbe who came from another municipality, while 43 residents attended schools outside the municipality.
