= Sarine District =

Coordinates: 46°47′03″N 7°05′59″E

- District
- Flag Coat of arms
- Country: Switzerland
- Canton: Fribourg
- Capital: Fribourg

Area
  - Total: 217.6 km^{2} (84.0 sq mi)

Population (31 December 2020)
  - Total: 107,158
  - Density: 492.5/km^{2} (1,275/sq mi)
- Time zone: UTC+1 (CET)
  - Summer (DST): UTC+2 (CEST)
- Municipalities: 25
- Website: Sarine

Sarine District (French: District de la Sarine [distʁi(kt) d(ə) la saʁin]; Arpitan: District de la Sarena [diʃˈtʁi də la ʃaʁˈnɑ]; German: Saanebezirk) is one of the seven districts of the canton of Fribourg in Switzerland. It is largely French-speaking, with a German-speaking minority. Its territory is drained by the Sarine river (which gives it its name), and by its tributary, the Glâne. It has a population of 107,158 (as of 31 December 2020).

== Municipalities ==
The district consists of the following twenty-five municipalities, including the cantonal capital Fribourg:

Coat of Arms	Municipality	Population (31 December 2020)	Area in km^{2}
	Autigny	782	6.22
	Avry	1,911	5.84
	Belfaux	3,342	8.88
	Bois-d'Amont	2,273	12.28
	Chénens	843	3.94
	Corminboeuf	2,794	7.23
	Cottens	1,482	4.97
	Ferpicloz	267	1.02
	Fribourg	38,039	9.28
	Gibloux	7,622	36.06
	Givisiez	3,143	3.46
	Granges-Paccot	3,839	3.99
	Hauterive	2,597	11.97
	La Brillaz	2,080	10.3
	La Sonnaz	1,233	6.96
	Le Mouret	3,148	18.56
	Marly	8,222	7.72
	Matran	1,620	2.91
	Neyruz	2,757	5.53
	Pierrafortscha	157	5.06
	Prez	2,345	12.61
	Treyvaux	1,466	11.4
	Villarsel-sur-Marly	75	1.39
	Villars-sur-Glâne	12,219	5.48
	Total	107,158	217.60

== Demographics ==
Sarine has a population (as of December 2020) of 107,158. Most of the population (as of 2000) speaks French (64,341 or 75.3%) as their first language, German is the second most common (12,373 or 14.5%) and Italian is the third (2,008 or 2.3%). There are 80 people who speak Romansh.

As of 2008, the population was 49.5% male and 50.5% female. The population was made up of 35,822 Swiss men (36.8% of the population) and 12,361 (12.7%) non-Swiss men. There were 38,411 Swiss women (39.5%) and 10,736 (11.0%) non-Swiss women. Of the population in the district, 23,761 or about 27.8% were born in Sarine and lived there in 2000. There were 27,074 or 31.7% who were born in the same canton, while 14,579 or 17.1% were born somewhere else in Switzerland, and 16,556 or 19.4% were born outside of Switzerland.

As of 2000, there were 40,123 people who were single and never married in the district. There were 37,194 married individuals, 4,156 widows or widowers and 3,992 individuals who are divorced.

There were 11,990 households that consist of only one person and 2,536 households with five or more people.

The historical population is given in the following chart:

== Mergers and name changes ==
- On 14 March 1970 the former municipalities of Marly-le-Grand and Marly-le-Petit merged to form the new municipality of Marly.
- On 1 June 1972 the former municipality of Illens merged into Rossens (FR).
- On 1 January 1976 the former municipality of Chésalles merged into Marly.
- On 1 January 1977 the former municipality of Sales (Sarine) merged into Ependes (FR) and the municipalities of Belfaux and Cutterwil merged into the municipality of Belfaux.
- On 1 January 1981 the former municipality of Nierlet-les-Bois merged into Ponthaux.
- On 1 January 1982 the former municipalities of Lossy and Formangueires merged to form the new municipality of Lossy-Formangueires.
- On 1 January 1989 the municipality of Bonnefontaine and Montécu merged into the municipality of Bonnefontaine.
- On 1 January 1996 the former municipalities of Grenilles, Farvagny-le-Grand, Farvagny-le-Petit and Posat merged to form the new municipality of Farvagny.
- On 1 January 1999 the former municipalities of Corpataux and Magnedens merged to form the new municipality of Corpataux-Magnedens.
- On 1 January 2001 the former municipalities of Onnens (FR), Lentigny and Lovens merged to form the new municipality of La Brillaz. The former municipalities of Ecuvillens and Posieux merged to form the new municipality of Hauterive (FR). The former municipalities of Corjolens and Avry-sur-Matran merged to form the new municipality of Avry.
- On 1 January 2003 the former municipalities of Zénauva, Essert (FR), Montévraz, Oberried (FR), Praroman and Bonnefontaine merged to form the new municipality of Le Mouret. The former municipalities of Villarsel-le-Gibloux, Villarlod, Estavayer-le-Gibloux and Rueyres-Saint-Laurent merged to form the new municipality of Le Glèbe.
- On 1 January 2004 the former municipalities of Cormagens, La Corbaz and Lossy-Formangueires merged to form the new municipality of La Sonnaz.
- On 1 January 2016 the former municipality of Autafond merged into the municipality of Belfaux. The 5 former municipalities of Corpataux-Magnedens, Farvagny, Le Glèbe, Rossens and Vuisternens-en-Ogoz merged to form the new municipality of Gibloux.
- On 1 January 2017 the municipality of Chésopelloz merged into the municipality of Corminboeuf.
- On 1 January 2020 the former municipalities of Corserey, Noréaz and Prez-vers-Noréaz merged to form the new municipality of Prez.
- On 1 January 2021 the former municipalities of Arconciel, Ependes and Senèdes merged to form the new municipality of Bois-d'Amont.
- On 1 January 2025 the former municipalities of Grolley and Ponthaux merged to form the new municipality of Grolley-Ponthaux.

== Politics ==
In the 2011 federal election the most popular party was the SP which received 32.2% of the vote. The next three most popular parties were the CVP (19.8%), the SVP (16.3%) and the FDP (9.4%).

The SPS received about the same percentage of the vote as they did in the 2007 Federal election (30.0% in 2007 vs 32.2% in 2011). The CVP retained about the same popularity (24.4% in 2007), the SVP retained about the same popularity (17.0% in 2007) and the FDP retained about the same popularity (10.6% in 2007). A total of 27,948 votes were cast in this election, of which 456 or 1.6% were invalid.

== Religion ==
From the 2000, census, 64,042 or 74.9% were Roman Catholic, while 6,395 or 7.5% belonged to the Swiss Reformed Church. Of the rest of the population, there were 856 members of an Orthodox church (or about 1.00% of the population), there were 52 individuals (or about 0.06% of the population) who belonged to the Christian Catholic Church, and there were 1,470 individuals (or about 1.72% of the population) who belonged to another Christian church. There were 95 individuals (or about 0.11% of the population) who were Jewish, and 2,851 (or about 3.34% of the population) who were Islamic. There were 248 individuals who were Buddhist, 142 individuals who were Hindu and 70 individuals who belonged to another church. 5,733 (or about 6.71% of the population) belonged to no church, are agnostic or atheist, and 4,198 individuals (or about 4.91% of the population) did not answer the question.

== Education ==
In Sarine about 28,052 or (32.8%) of the population have completed non-mandatory upper secondary education, and 13,250 or (15.5%) have completed additional higher education (either university or a Fachhochschule). Of the 13,250 who completed tertiary schooling, 54.8% were Swiss men, 28.4% were Swiss women, 9.9% were non-Swiss men and 6.9% were non-Swiss women.

The Canton of Fribourg school system provides one year of non-obligatory Kindergarten, followed by six years of Primary school. This is followed by three years of obligatory lower Secondary school where the students are separated according to ability and aptitude. Following the lower Secondary students may attend a three or four year optional upper Secondary school. The upper Secondary school is divided into gymnasium (university preparatory) and vocational programs. After they finish the upper Secondary program, students may choose to attend a Tertiary school or continue their apprenticeship.

During the 2010-11 school year, there were a total of 23,288 students attending 1,525 classes in Sarine. A total of 17,074 students from the district attended any school, either in the district or outside of it. There were 92 kindergarten classes with a total of 1,620 students in the district. The district had 346 primary classes and 6,471 students. During the same year, there were 192 lower secondary classes with a total of 3,819 students. There were 580 vocational upper Secondary classes and were 189 upper Secondary classes, with 4,042 upper Secondary students and 6,123 vocational upper Secondary students The district had 92 specialized Tertiary classes and were 34 non-university Tertiary classes, with 534 non-university Tertiary students and 679 specialized Tertiary students.
