= Chapel of Notre-Dame de Posat =

Chapel in the canton of Fribourg, Switzerland

- Chapelle Notre-Dame de Posat (French)
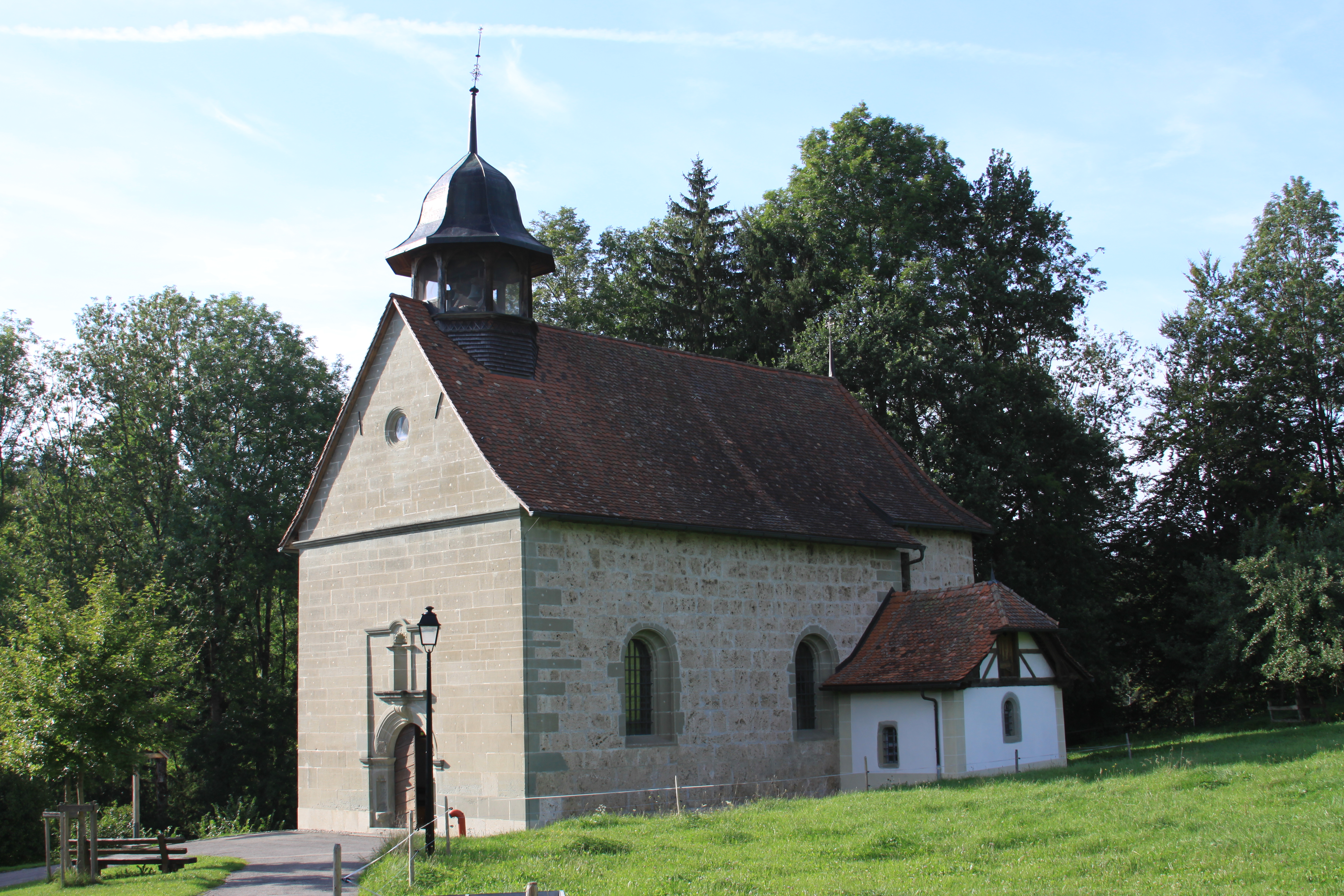

- Location within Switzerland Location within Canton of Fribourg
- 46°44′07″N 07°03′11″E
- Type: Roman Catholic chapel
- Location: Posat, Gibloux commune, canton of Fribourg, Switzerland

Swiss Cultural Property of National Significance
- Official name: Chapelle Notre-Dame, Posat
- Reference no.: 9955

The chapel of Notre-Dame de Posat is a Roman Catholic chapel located in the village of Posat of the Gibloux commune, canton of Fribourg, Switzerland. It is listed as a heritage site of national significance.

== History ==
The chapel was probably built in 1140 by the lords of Pont for Humilimont Abbey. The abbey belonged to the Order of Canons Regular of Prémontré which owned land in the village of Posat. Between 1145 and 1159, the chapel hosted the sisters of St. Norbert. In 1362, 58 nuns were still living there.

During the Reformation, the nunnery was closed in 1580 one year after Marsens Abbey. The inn-restaurant De la Croix d’Or was built over the remains of the convent. The original chapel of Posat was built in the same period than the convent; it was destroyed, then re-built and consecrated in 1675 by the Jesuits. Dedicated to the Virgin Mary, it became a pilgrimage site in the 18th century: the worshippers came there to pray in front of a statue described as "miraculous yet fully worm-eaten". A water source under the chapel is said to cure eye diseases.

In 1695, the old shrine was replaced with a larger and better-adorned Renaissance chapel donated by Mrs. Colonelle Praroman. The table of the main altar (Visitation), as well as the four other paintings of the choir and the ten others of the nave, show the mysteries of the Holy Rosary. The chapel also has other paintings that represent Saint Joseph, Saint Ann and the Doctors of the Church. The tabernacle, made of carved golden wood, was donated by the court of Louis XV to the Jesuit Fathers.

The building was renovated in 2003–2004 and has been listed among the Swiss Cultural Property of National Significance since at least 1995.

== See also ==
- List of cultural property of national significance in Switzerland: Fribourg
