= Vuisternens-en-Ogoz =

- Former municipality
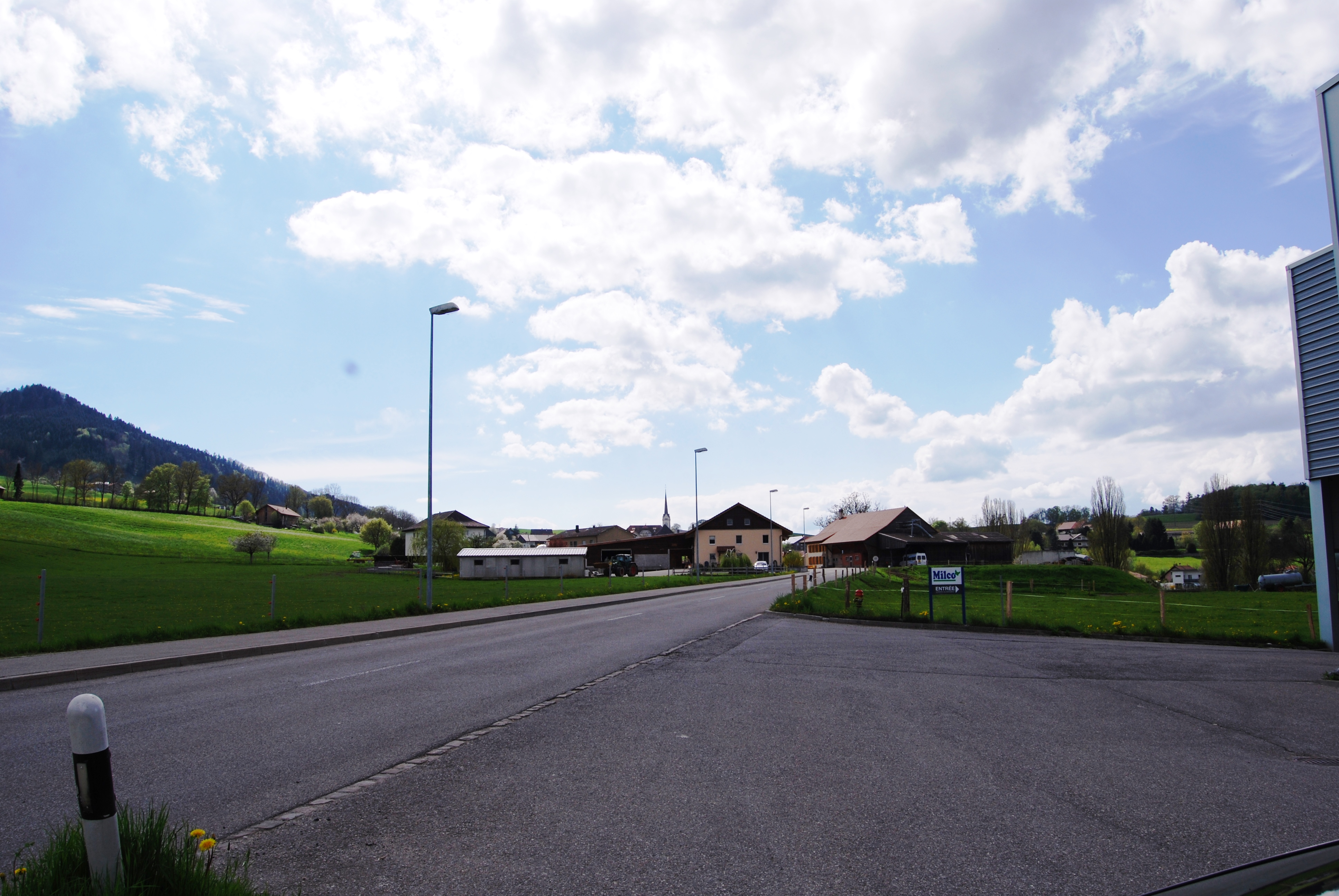

- Coat of arms
- Location of Vuisternens-en-Ogoz
- Location within Switzerland Location within Canton of Fribourg
- Coordinates: 46°42′N 7°3′E
- Country: Switzerland
- Canton: Fribourg
- District: Sarine

Government
  - Mayor: Syndic

Area
  - Total: 6.24 km^{2} (2.41 sq mi)
- Elevation: 800 m (2,600 ft)

Population (Dec 2014)
  - Total: 619
  - Density: 99.2/km^{2} (257/sq mi)
- Time zone: UTC+01:00 (CET)
  - Summer (DST): UTC+02:00 (CEST)
- Postal code: 1696
- SFOS number: 2231
- ISO 3166 code: CH-FR
- Surrounded by: Farvagny, Le Glèbe, Pont-en-Ogoz
- Website: commune-gibloux.ch

Vuisternens-en-Ogoz (french pronunciation: [vistɛʁnɑ̃s ɑ̃n‿ɔɡo]; Arpitan: Vouéthèrnens [vɛθɛʁˈnɛ̃]) is a former municipality in the district of Sarine in the canton of Fribourg in Switzerland. On 1 January 2016 it merged with Corpataux-Magnedens, Farvagny, Le Glèbe and Rossens to form the new municipality of Gibloux.

== Geography ==
Vuisternens-en-Ogoz had an area, as of 2009, of 6.2 square kilometers (2.4 mi^{2}). Of this area, 3.99 km^{2} (1.54 mi^{2}) or 64.5% is used for agricultural purposes, while 1.76 km^{2} (0.68 mi^{2}) or 28.4% is forested. Of the rest of the land, 0.49 km^{2} (0.19 mi^{2}) or 7.9% is settled (buildings or roads).

Of the built up area, industrial buildings made up 1.5% of the total area while housing and buildings made up 3.7% and transportation infrastructure made up 1.6%. Out of the forested land, 27.0% of the total land area is heavily forested and 1.5% is covered with orchards or small clusters of trees. Of the agricultural land, 26.8% is used for growing crops and 33.9% is pastures and 3.4% is used for alpine pastures.

== Coat of arms ==
The blazon of the municipal coat of arms is Gules on a Bend Or cotised Argent a Lion passant Azure langued of the first.

== Demographics ==
Vuisternens-en-Ogoz had a population (as of 2014) of 619. As of 2008, 19.4% of the population are resident foreign nationals. Over the last 10 years (2000–2010) the population has changed at a rate of 9.6%. Migration accounted for 2.6%, while births and deaths accounted for 7.9%.

Most of the population (as of 2000) speaks French (632 or 89.1%) as their first language, Portuguese is the second most common (33 or 4.7%) and German is the third (20 or 2.8%). There are 2 people who speak Italian and 1 person who speaks Romansh.

As of 2008, the population was 53.0% male and 47.0% female. The population was made up of 320 Swiss men (40.0% of the population) and 104 (13.0%) non-Swiss men. There were 305 Swiss women (38.1%) and 71 (8.9%) non-Swiss women. Of the population in the municipality, 246 or about 34.7% were born in Vuisternens-en-Ogoz and lived there in 2000. There were 274 or 38.6% who were born in the same canton, while 68 or 9.6% were born somewhere else in Switzerland, and 103 or 14.5% were born outside of Switzerland.

As of 2000, children and teenagers (0–19 years old) make up 31.9% of the population, while adults (20–64 years old) make up 57.7% and seniors (over 64 years old) make up 10.4%.

As of 2000, there were 334 people who were single and never married in the municipality. There were 324 married individuals, 28 widows or widowers and 23 individuals who are divorced.

As of 2000, there were 259 private households in the municipality, and an average of 2.7 persons per household. There were 70 households that consist of only one person and 36 households with five or more people. In 2000, a total of 245 apartments (79.8% of the total) were permanently occupied, while 47 apartments (15.3%) were seasonally occupied and 15 apartments (4.9%) were empty. The vacancy rate for the municipality, in 2010, was 1.45%.

The historical population is given in the following chart:

== Politics ==
In the 2011 federal election the most popular party was the SPS which received 29.6% of the vote. The next three most popular parties were the CVP (23.1%), the SVP (11.8%) and the Green Party (7.6%).

The SPS received about the same percentage of the vote as they did in the 2007 Federal election (34.2% in 2007 vs 29.6% in 2011). The CVP retained about the same popularity (24.5% in 2007), the SVP retained about the same popularity (11.9% in 2007) and the Green retained about the same popularity (11.5% in 2007). A total of 235 votes were cast in this election, of which 2 or 0.9% were invalid.

== Economy ==
As of 2010, Vuisternens-en-Ogoz had an unemployment rate of 2.6%. As of 2008, there were 57 people employed in the primary economic sector and about 16 businesses involved in this sector. 53 people were employed in the secondary sector and there were 8 businesses in this sector. 51 people were employed in the tertiary sector, with 8 businesses in this sector. There were 376 residents of the municipality who were employed in some capacity, of which females made up 42.0% of the workforce.

In 2008 the total number of full-time equivalent jobs was 125. The number of jobs in the primary sector was 40, of which 23 were in agriculture and 17 were in forestry or lumber production. The number of jobs in the secondary sector was 51 of which 22 or (43.1%) were in manufacturing and 30 (58.8%) were in construction. The number of jobs in the tertiary sector was 34. In the tertiary sector; 16 or 47.1% were in wholesale or retail sales or the repair of motor vehicles, 11 or 32.4% were in a hotel or restaurant, 4 or 11.8% were in education.

In 2000, there were 58 workers who commuted into the municipality and 283 workers who commuted away. The municipality is a net exporter of workers, with about 4.9 workers leaving the municipality for every one entering. Of the working population, 10.1% used public transportation to get to work, and 71.3% used a private car.

== Religion ==
From the 2000 census, 583 or 82.2% were Roman Catholic, while 35 or 4.9% belonged to the Swiss Reformed Church. Of the rest of the population, there were 6 members of an Orthodox church (or about 0.85% of the population), and there was 1 individual who belongs to another Christian church. There were 3 individuals (or about 0.42% of the population) who were Jewish, and 14 (or about 1.97% of the population) who were Islamic. 36 (or about 5.08% of the population) belonged to no church, are agnostic or atheist, and 31 individuals (or about 4.37% of the population) did not answer the question.

== Education ==
In Vuisternens-en-Ogoz about 209 or (29.5%) of the population have completed non-mandatory upper secondary education, and 48 or (6.8%) have completed additional higher education (either university or a Fachhochschule). Of the 48 who completed tertiary schooling, 47.9% were Swiss men, 37.5% were Swiss women, 10.4% were non-Swiss men.

The Canton of Fribourg school system provides one year of non-obligatory Kindergarten, followed by six years of Primary school. This is followed by three years of obligatory lower Secondary school where the students are separated according to ability and aptitude. Following the lower Secondary students may attend a three or four year optional upper Secondary school. The upper Secondary school is divided into gymnasium (university preparatory) and vocational programs. After they finish the upper Secondary program, students may choose to attend a Tertiary school or continue their apprenticeship.

During the 2010-11 school year, there were a total of 97 students attending 5 classes in Vuisternens-en-Ogoz. A total of 180 students from the municipality attended any school, either in the municipality or outside of it. There was one kindergarten class with a total of 20 students in the municipality. The municipality had 4 primary classes and 77 students. During the same year, there were no lower secondary classes in the municipality, but 43 students attended lower secondary school in a neighboring municipality. There were no upper Secondary classes or vocational classes, but there were 17 upper Secondary students and 28 upper Secondary vocational students who attended classes in another municipality. The municipality had no non-university Tertiary classes, but there was one non-university Tertiary student and 2 specialized Tertiary students who attended classes in another municipality.

As of 2000, there were 34 students in Vuisternens-en-Ogoz who came from another municipality, while 101 residents attended schools outside the municipality.
