= Avry-devant-Pont =

Former municipality, canton of Fribourg

- Former municipality
- Aerial view (1964)

- Coat of arms
- Location of Avry-devant-Pont
- Location within Switzerland Location within Canton of Fribourg
- Coordinates: 46.683338°N 7.083329°E
- Country: Switzerland
- Canton: Fribourg
- District: Gruyère
- Municipality: Pont-en-Ogoz

Population (2000)
  - Total: 424
- Time zone: UTC+01:00 (CET)
  - Summer (DST): UTC+02:00 (CEST)
- ISO 3166 code: CH-FR
- Website

Avry-devant-Pont is a former municipality in the Gruyère district of the canton of Fribourg, Switzerland. In 2003 it merged with Gumefens and Le Bry to form the new municipality of Pont-en-Ogoz.

== History ==
Avry-devant-Pont is mentioned in the 12th century as Aprilis and Avril. There are remains of a Roman villa at Au Pavillon, whose residential part has not yet been discovered, and probably of a Roman bridge. At Vieux Châtel there is an undated motte.

Avry belonged to the lordship of Pont, which Antoine de Menthon sold in 1482 to Fribourg; the city made it a bailiwick. The communal statutes date from 1578. In 1177 Pope Alexander III confirmed the incorporation of the church of Avry into the hospice of the Great St Bernard. The parish, mentioned in 1228, also included Gumefens and Pont-en-Ogoz. The chapter of Saint Nicholas claimed the advowson in 1522 and obtained it in 1603. The church of Saint Martin was rebuilt in 1833.

In 1798 revolutionary militias from the surrounding area and from Vaud set up a camp at Avry, known as le poste invincible (the invincible post), before marching on Fribourg. In the 19th century Avry was one of the centers of straw hat making. Fodder crops are grown and cattle are raised. The Gruyère dam was built in 1948, the A12 motorway in 1981 and the motorway service area in 1982.

Avry-devant-Pont had 264 inhabitants in 1811, 372 in 1850, 427 in 1900, 302 in 1950, 254 in 1960 and 424 in 2000.

== Bibliography ==
- A. Dellion, Dictionnaire historique et statistique des paroisses catholiques du canton de Fribourg, vol. 1, pp. 310–355
- G. Fragnière, "Notices historiques sur la paroisse d'Avry-devant-Pont et ses communes", in Grande Kermesse paroissiale, Avry-devant-Pont, 1974, pp. 17–39
