= Autigny, Switzerland =

Autigny
- Municipality
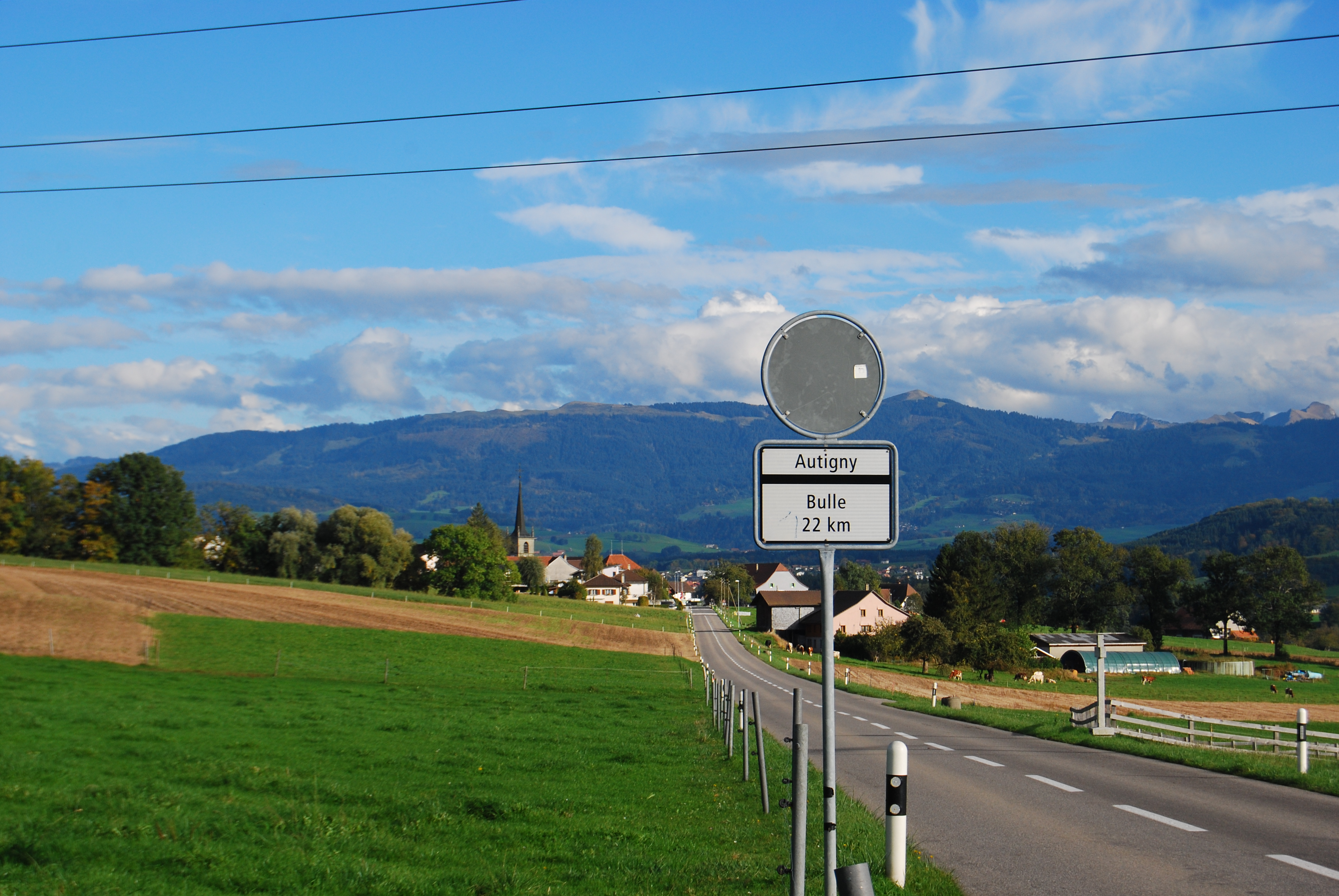

- Flag Coat of arms
- Location of Autigny
- Location within Switzerland Location within Canton of Fribourg
- Coordinates: 46°44′N 7°1′E
- Country: Switzerland
- Canton: Fribourg
- District: Sarine

Government
  - Mayor: Syndic

Area
  - Total: 6.22 km^{2} (2.40 sq mi)
- Elevation: 684 m (2,244 ft)

Population (Dec 2014)
  - Total: 774
  - Density: 124/km^{2} (322/sq mi)
- Time zone: UTC+01:00 (CET)
  - Summer (DST): UTC+02:00 (CEST)
- Postal code: 1742
- SFOS number: 2173
- ISO 3166 code: CH-FR
- Surrounded by: Chénens, Cottens, Farvagny, La Brillaz, Le Glèbe, Villorsonnens
- Website: autigny.ch

Autigny (French pronunciation: [otiɲi]) is a municipality in the district of Sarine in the canton of Fribourg in Switzerland.

== History ==
Autigny is first mentioned in 1068 as Altignei. The municipality was formerly known by its German name Ottenach, however, that name is no longer used.

== Geography ==
Autigny has an area, as of 2009, of 6.2 square kilometers (2.4 mi^{2}). Of this area, 4.36 km^{2} (1.68 mi^{2}) or 70.1% is used for agricultural purposes, while 1.35 km^{2} (0.52 mi^{2}) or 21.7% is forested. Of the rest of the land, 0.43 km^{2} (0.17 mi^{2}) or 6.9% is settled (buildings or roads), 0.05 km^{2} (12 acres) or 0.8% is either rivers or lakes and 0.03 km^{2} (7.4 acres) or 0.5% is unproductive land.

Of the built up area, housing and buildings made up 3.2% and transportation infrastructure made up 2.9%. Out of the forested land, 20.3% of the total land area is heavily forested and 1.4% is covered with orchards or small clusters of trees. Of the agricultural land, 43.9% is used for growing crops and 25.9% is pastures. All the water in the municipality is flowing water.

The municipality is located in the Sarine district, along the Glane and the Neirigue.

== Coat of arms ==
The blazon of the municipal coat of arms is Argent a lance Or on a Bend Gules between two Crosses bottony of the last.

== Demographics ==
Autigny has a population (as of December 2020) of 782. As of 2008, 8.3% of the population are resident foreign nationals. Over the last 10 years (2000–2010) the population has changed at a rate of 13.9%. Migration accounted for 7.4%, while births and deaths accounted for 5.9%.

Most of the population (as of 2000) speaks French (572 or 93.5%) as their first language, German is the second most common (16 or 2.6%) and Portuguese is the third (8 or 1.3%). There are 2 people who speak Italian.

As of 2008, the population was 49.6% male and 50.4% female. The population was made up of 312 Swiss men (45.0% of the population) and 32 (4.6%) non-Swiss men. There were 312 Swiss women (45.0%) and 37 (5.3%) non-Swiss women. Of the population in the municipality, 251 or about 41.0% were born in Autigny and lived there in 2000. There were 228 or 37.3% who were born in the same canton, while 82 or 13.4% were born somewhere else in Switzerland, and 45 or 7.4% were born outside of Switzerland.

As of 2000, children and teenagers (0–19 years old) make up 26.6% of the population, while adults (20–64 years old) make up 61.9% and seniors (over 64 years old) make up 11.4%.

As of 2000, there were 281 people who were single and never married in the municipality. There were 287 married individuals, 24 widows or widowers and 20 individuals who are divorced.

As of 2000, there were 221 private households in the municipality, and an average of 2.8 persons per household. There were 53 households that consist of only one person and 34 households with five or more people. In 2000, a total of 216 apartments (90.0% of the total) were permanently occupied, while 15 apartments (6.3%) were seasonally occupied and 9 apartments (3.8%) were empty. The vacancy rate for the municipality, in 2010, was 0.36%.

The historical population is given in the following chart:

== Politics ==
In the 2011 federal election the most popular party was the SVP which received 28.6% of the vote. The next three most popular parties were the SP (24.8%), the CVP (18.8%) and the FDP (7.8%).

The SVP received about the same percentage of the vote as they did in the 2007 Federal election (29.1% in 2007 vs 28.6% in 2011). The SPS retained about the same popularity (27.4% in 2007), the CVP retained about the same popularity (19.9% in 2007) and the FDP retained about the same popularity (11.6% in 2007). A total of 251 votes were cast in this election, of which 8 or 3.2% were invalid.

== Economy ==
As of 2010, Autigny had an unemployment rate of 2%. As of 2008, there were 53 people employed in the primary economic sector and about 22 businesses involved in this sector. 15 people were employed in the secondary sector and there were 5 businesses in this sector. 30 people were employed in the tertiary sector, with 10 businesses in this sector. There were 317 residents of the municipality who were employed in some capacity, of which females made up 40.1% of the workforce.

In 2008 the total number of full-time equivalent jobs was 76. The number of jobs in the primary sector was 40, of which 38 were in agriculture and 2 were in forestry or lumber production. The number of jobs in the secondary sector was 14 of which 12 or (85.7%) were in manufacturing and 2 (14.3%) were in construction. The number of jobs in the tertiary sector was 22. In the tertiary sector; 4 or 18.2% were in wholesale or retail sales or the repair of motor vehicles, 1 was in the movement and storage of goods, 4 or 18.2% were in a hotel or restaurant, 1 was a technical professional or scientist, 5 or 22.7% were in education and 4 or 18.2% were in health care.

In 2000, there were 18 workers who commuted into the municipality and 228 workers who commuted away. The municipality is a net exporter of workers, with about 12.7 workers leaving the municipality for every one entering. Of the working population, 6.9% used public transportation to get to work, and 74.8% used a private car.

== Religion ==
From the 2000 census, 512 or 83.7% were Roman Catholic, while 38 or 6.2% belonged to the Swiss Reformed Church. Of the rest of the population, there were 3 members of an Orthodox church (or about 0.49% of the population), and there were 28 individuals (or about 4.58% of the population) who belonged to another Christian church. There were 3 (or about 0.49% of the population) who were Islamic. 30 (or about 4.90% of the population) belonged to no church, are agnostic or atheist, and 12 individuals (or about 1.96% of the population) did not answer the question.

== Education ==
In Autigny about 202 or (33.0%) of the population have completed non-mandatory upper secondary education, and 74 or (12.1%) have completed additional higher education (either university or a Fachhochschule). Of the 74 who completed tertiary schooling, 63.5% were Swiss men, 29.7% were Swiss women.

The Canton of Fribourg school system provides one year of non-obligatory Kindergarten, followed by six years of Primary school. This is followed by three years of obligatory lower Secondary school where the students are separated according to ability and aptitude. Following the lower Secondary students may attend a three or four year optional upper Secondary school. The upper Secondary school is divided into gymnasium (university preparatory) and vocational programs. After they finish the upper Secondary program, students may choose to attend a Tertiary school or continue their apprenticeship.

During the 2010–11 school year, there were a total of 65 students attending 4 classes in Autigny. A total of 129 students from the municipality attended any school, either in the municipality or outside of it. There were 2 kindergarten classes with a total of 34 students in the municipality. The municipality had 2 primary classes and 31 students. During the same year, there were no lower secondary classes in the municipality, but 27 students attended lower secondary school in a neighboring municipality. There were no upper Secondary classes or vocational classes, but there were 14 upper Secondary students and 22 upper Secondary vocational students who attended classes in another municipality. The municipality had no non-university Tertiary classes, but there were 3 non-university Tertiary students and 2 specialized Tertiary students who attended classes in another municipality.

As of 2000, there were 43 students in Autigny who came from another municipality, while 57 residents attended schools outside the municipality.
