= Farvagny =

- Former municipality
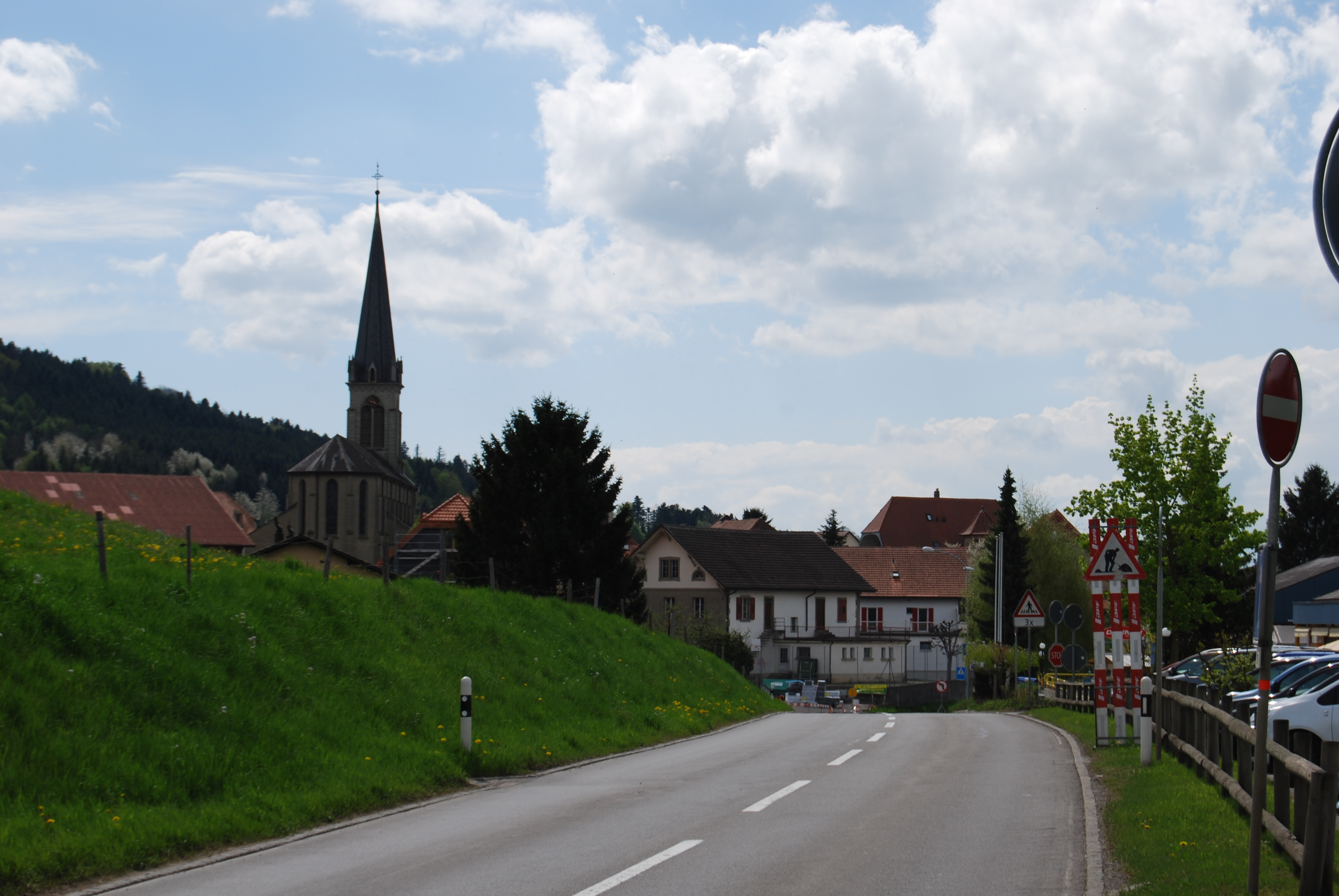

- Coat of arms
- Location of Farvagny
- Location within Switzerland Location within Canton of Fribourg
- Coordinates: 46°43′N 7°4′E
- Country: Switzerland
- Canton: Fribourg
- District: Sarine

Government
  - Mayor: Syndic

Area
  - Total: 10.03 km^{2} (3.87 sq mi)
- Elevation: 700 m (2,300 ft)

Population (Dec 2014)
  - Total: 2,215
  - Density: 220.8/km^{2} (572.0/sq mi)
- Time zone: UTC+01:00 (CET)
  - Summer (DST): UTC+02:00 (CEST)
- Postal code: 1726
- SFOS number: 2192
- ISO 3166 code: CH-FR
- Surrounded by: Autigny, Corpataux-Magnedens, Cottens, Hauterive, Le Glèbe, Pont-en-Ogoz, Rossens, Vuisternens-en-Ogoz
- Website: commune-gibloux.ch

Farvagny (French: [faʁvaɲi]; Arpitan: Farvagni) is a former municipality in the district of Sarine in the canton of Fribourg in Switzerland. The former municipalities of Farvagny-le-Grand, Farvagny-le-Petit, Grenilles and Posat merged in 1996 to form it. On 1 January 2016 it merged with Corpataux-Magnedens, Le Glèbe, Rossens and Vuisternens-en-Ogoz to form the new municipality of Gibloux.

== Geography ==
Aerial view (1949)

Land (as of 2009)
Type of Land	Area	%
Agricultural	6.62 km^{2} (2.56 sq mi)	66%
Forested	2.09 km^{2} (0.81 sq mi)	20.8%
Settled (buildings and road)	1.2 km^{2} (0.46 sq mi)	12%
Water	0.09 km^{2} (0.035 sq mi)	0.9%
Unproductive	0.03 km^{2} (0.012 sq mi)	0.03%
Total	10.03 km^{2} (3.87 sq mi)	100%

Of the built up area, housing and buildings made up 6.0% and transportation infrastructure made up 3.9%. Power and water infrastructure as well as other special developed areas made up 1.4% of the area Out of the forested land, 19.2% of the total land area is heavily forested and 1.6% is covered with orchards or small clusters of trees. Of the agricultural land, 43.8% is used for growing crops and 21.9% is pastures. All the water in the municipality is flowing water.

The former municipality is located in the Sarine district.

== Coat of arms ==
The blazon of the municipal coat of arms is Gules a Lion passant Azure langued of the first on a Bend Or between two Maple Leaves Argent. The coat of arms is a combination of the coats of arms of the four former municipalities. The lion and gold stripe come from Farvagny-le-Petit and Posat while the maple leaves are from Farvagny-le-Grand.

== Demographics ==
Farvagny had a population (as of 2014) of 2215. As of 2008, 9.9% of the population are resident foreign nationals. Over the last 10 years (2000–2010) the population has changed at a rate of 20.1%. Migration accounted for 12.6%, while births and deaths accounted for 8.5%.

Most of the population (as of 2000) speaks French (1,635 or 92.1%) as their first language, German is the second most common (84 or 4.7%) and Portuguese is the third (18 or 1.0%). There are 13 people who speak Italian and 1 person who speaks Romansh.

As of 2008, the population was 47.7% male and 52.3% female. The population was made up of 882 Swiss men (42.8% of the population) and 101 (4.9%) non-Swiss men. There were 950 Swiss women (46.1%) and 128 (6.2%) non-Swiss women. Of the population in the municipality, 578 or about 32.6% were born in Farvagny and lived there in 2000. There were 743 or 41.9% who were born in the same canton, while 240 or 13.5% were born somewhere else in Switzerland, and 158 or 8.9% were born outside of Switzerland.

As of 2000, children and teenagers (0–19 years old) make up 31.1% of the population, while adults (20–64 years old) make up 58.8% and seniors (over 64 years old) make up 10.1%.

As of 2000, there were 792 people who were single and never married in the municipality. There were 821 married individuals, 99 widows or widowers and 63 individuals who are divorced.

As of 2000, there were 616 private households in the municipality, and an average of 2.8 persons per household. There were 144 households that consist of only one person and 82 households with five or more people. In 2000, a total of 600 apartments (92.2% of the total) were permanently occupied, while 34 apartments (5.2%) were seasonally occupied and 17 apartments (2.6%) were empty. As of 2009, the construction rate of new housing units was 4.3 new units per 1000 residents. The vacancy rate for the municipality, in 2010, was 0.5%.

The historical population is given in the following chart:

== Heritage sites of national significance ==
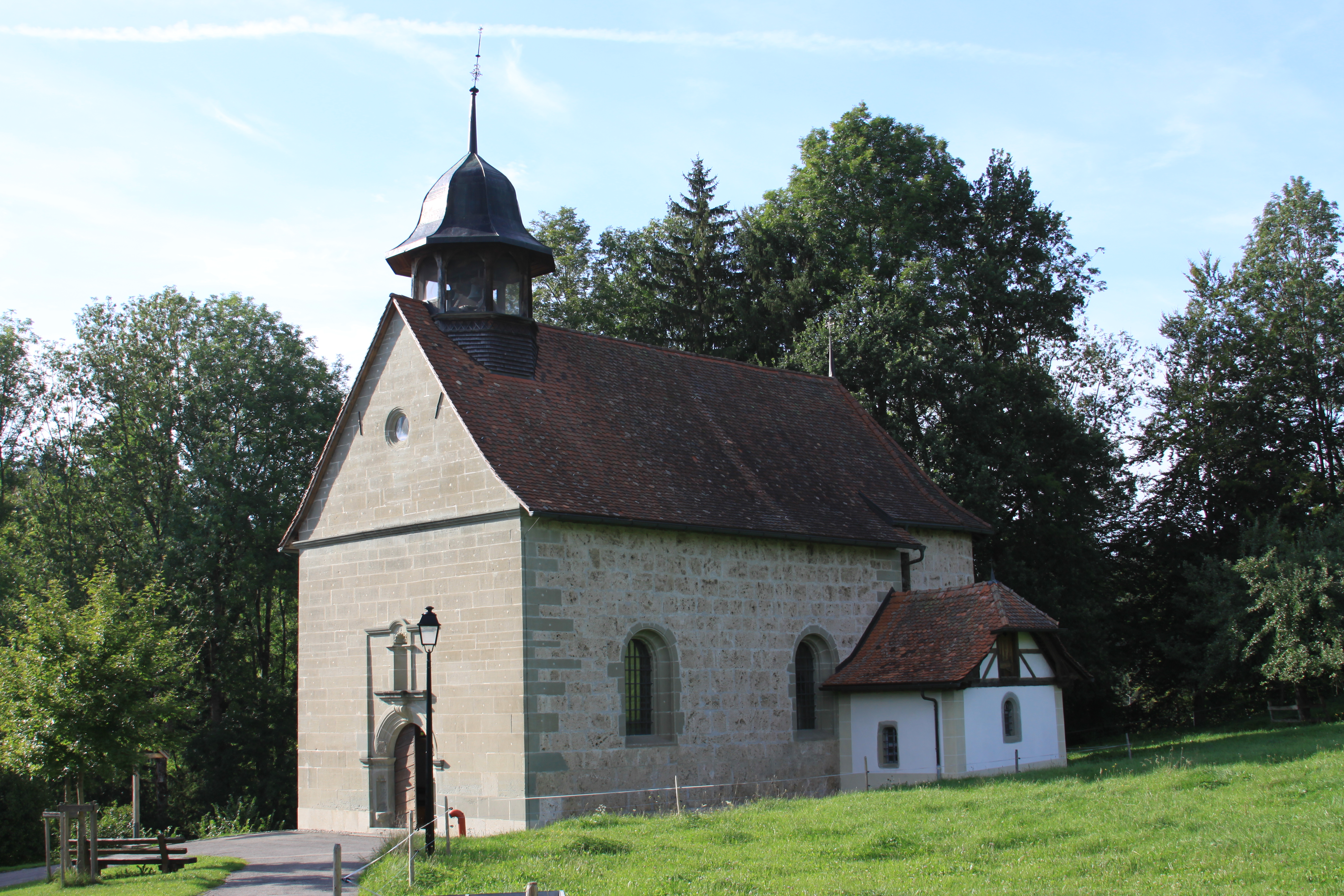
Notre-Dame Chapel

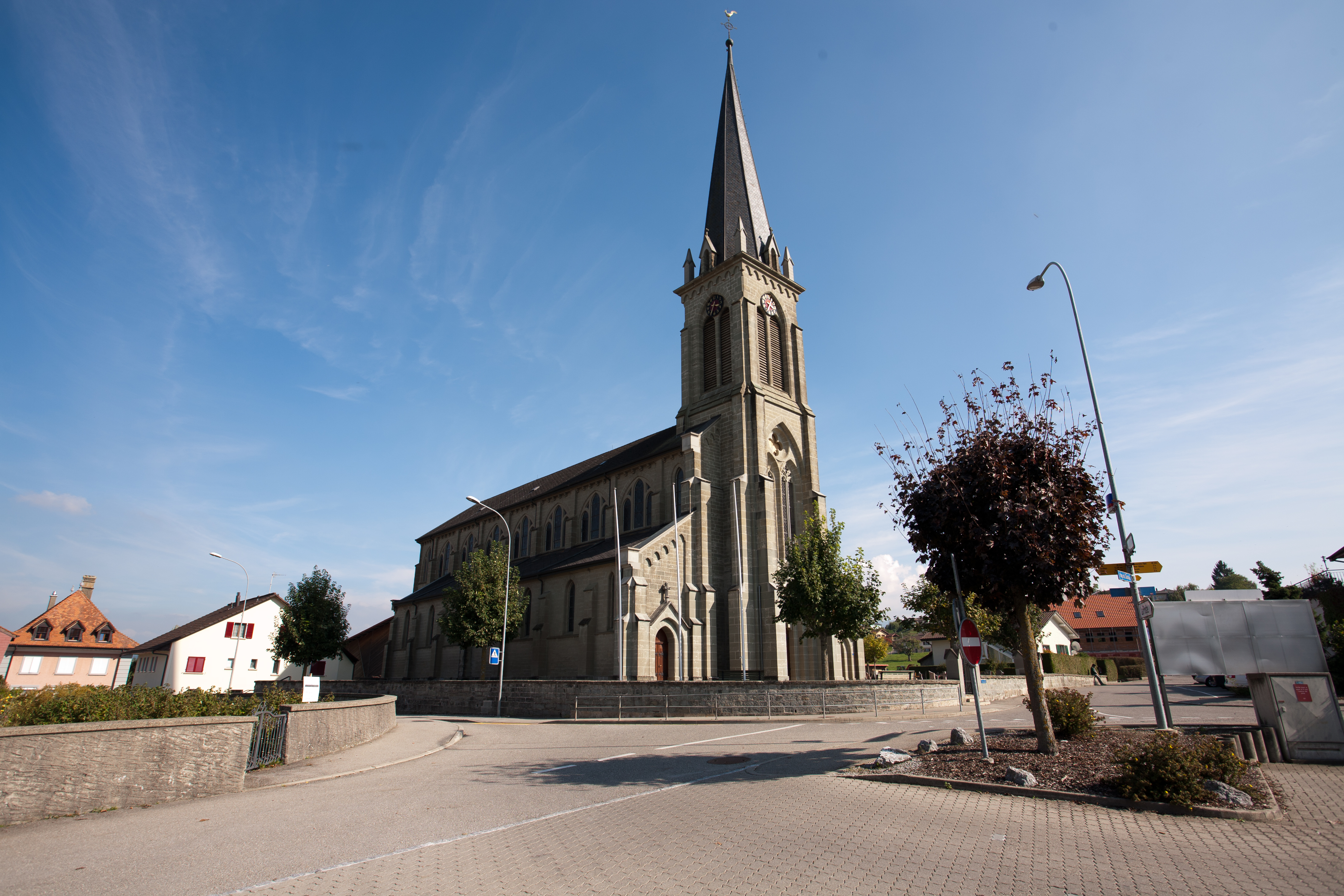
Saint Vincent Church

The Chapel Notre-Dame and the Church of Saint-Vincent are listed as Swiss heritage site of national significance.

== Politics ==
In the 2011 federal election the most popular party was the SPS which received 28.1% of the vote. The next three most popular parties were the SVP (18.9%), the CVP (16.2%) and the FDP (9.6%).

The SPS received about the same percentage of the vote as they did in the 2007 Federal election (25.1% in 2007 vs 28.1% in 2011). The SVP moved from third in 2007 (with 20.7%) to second in 2011, the CVP moved from second in 2007 (with 21.9%) to third and the FDP retained about the same popularity (12.2% in 2007). A total of 565 votes were cast in this election, of which 7 or 1.2% were invalid.

== Economy ==
As of 2010, Farvagny had an unemployment rate of 3.3%. As of 2008, there were 78 people employed in the primary economic sector and about 31 businesses involved in this sector. 253 people were employed in the secondary sector and there were 19 businesses in this sector. 320 people were employed in the tertiary sector, with 45 businesses in this sector. There were 891 residents of the municipality who were employed in some capacity, of which females made up 43.8% of the workforce.

In 2008 the total number of full-time equivalent jobs was 533. The number of jobs in the primary sector was 57, all of which were in agriculture. The number of jobs in the secondary sector was 246 of which 73 or (29.7%) were in manufacturing and 173 (70.3%) were in construction. The number of jobs in the tertiary sector was 230. In the tertiary sector; 41 or 17.8% were in wholesale or retail sales or the repair of motor vehicles, 20 or 8.7% were in the movement and storage of goods, 16 or 7.0% were in a hotel or restaurant, 1 was in the information industry, 4 or 1.7% were the insurance or financial industry, 7 or 3.0% were technical professionals or scientists, 45 or 19.6% were in education and 81 or 35.2% were in health care.

In 2000, there were 308 workers who commuted into the municipality and 652 workers who commuted away. The municipality is a net exporter of workers, with about 2.1 workers leaving the municipality for every one entering. Of the working population, 7.2% used public transportation to get to work, and 77.8% used a private car.

== Religion ==
From the 2000 census, 1,436 or 80.9% were Roman Catholic, while 101 or 5.7% belonged to the Swiss Reformed Church. Of the rest of the population, there were 10 members of an Orthodox church (or about 0.56% of the population), and there were 38 individuals (or about 2.14% of the population) who belonged to another Christian church. There were 14 (or about 0.79% of the population) who were Islamic. There were 5 individuals who were Buddhist and 1 individual who belonged to another church. 116 (or about 6.54% of the population) belonged to no church, are agnostic or atheist, and 73 individuals (or about 4.11% of the population) did not answer the question.

== Education ==
In Farvagny about 530 or (29.9%) of the population have completed non-mandatory upper secondary education, and 202 or (11.4%) have completed additional higher education (either university or a Fachhochschule). Of the 202 who completed tertiary schooling, 62.9% were Swiss men, 24.8% were Swiss women, 8.4% were non-Swiss men and 4.0% were non-Swiss women.

The Canton of Fribourg school system provides one year of non-obligatory Kindergarten, followed by six years of Primary school. This is followed by three years of obligatory lower Secondary school where the students are separated according to ability and aptitude. Following the lower Secondary students may attend a three or four year optional upper Secondary school. The upper Secondary school is divided into gymnasium (university preparatory) and vocational programs. After they finish the upper Secondary program, students may choose to attend a Tertiary school or continue their apprenticeship.

During the 2010–11 school year, there were a total of 603 students attending 31 classes in Farvagny. A total of 464 students from the municipality attended any school, either in the municipality or outside of it. There were 3 kindergarten classes with a total of 62 students in the municipality. The municipality had 8 primary classes and 140 students. During the same year, there were 20 lower secondary classes with a total of 401 students. There were no upper Secondary classes or vocational classes, but there were 64 upper Secondary students and 63 upper Secondary vocational students who attended classes in another municipality. The municipality had no non-university Tertiary classes, but there were 3 non-university Tertiary students and 9 specialized Tertiary students who attended classes in another municipality.

As of 2000, there were 215 students in Farvagny who came from another municipality, while 100 residents attended schools outside the municipality.
