= Gibloux =

- Municipality
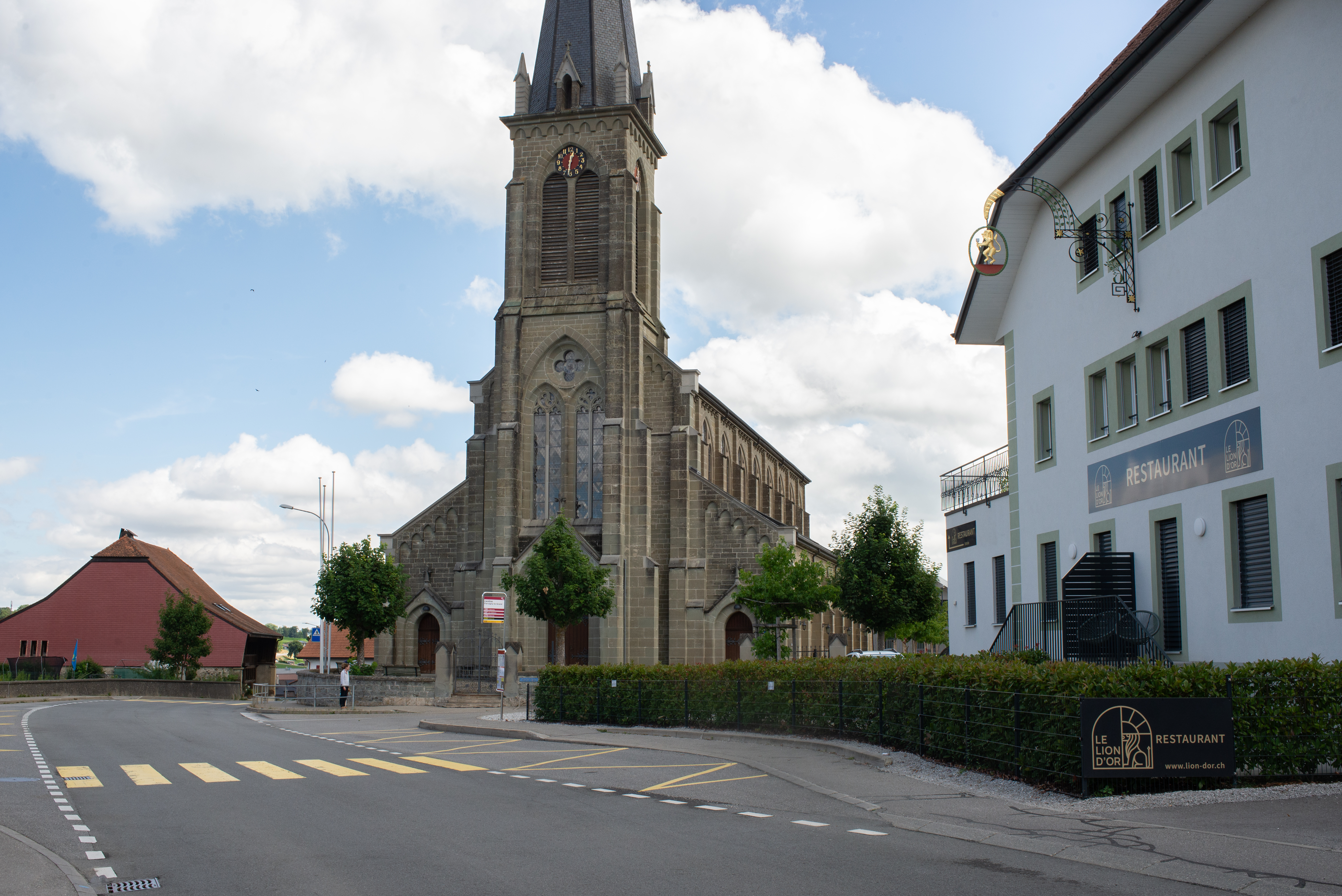

- Coat of arms
- Location of Gibloux
- Location within Switzerland Location within Canton of Fribourg
- Coordinates: 46°44′N 7°6′E
- Country: Switzerland
- Canton: Fribourg
- District: Sarine

Government
  - Mayor: Syndic

Area
  - Total: 36.06 km^{2} (13.92 sq mi)
- Elevation: 687 m (2,254 ft)

Population (Dec 2014)
  - Total: 7,025
  - Density: 194.8/km^{2} (504.6/sq mi)
- Time zone: UTC+01:00 (CET)
  - Summer (DST): UTC+02:00 (CEST)
- Postal code: 1695-6, 1726-8
- SFOS number: 2236
- ISO 3166 code: CH-FR
- Surrounded by: Autigny, Arconciel, Cottens, Hauterive, Pont-en-Ogoz
- Website: https://www.commune-gibloux.ch SFSO statistics

Gibloux (French: [ʒiblu]; Arpitan: Dzubyà [dzyˈbjɑ]) is a municipality in the district of Sarine in the canton of Fribourg in Switzerland. The municipality was formed 1 January 2016, from the merger of Corpataux-Magnedens, Farvagny, Le Glèbe, Rossens and Vuisternens-en-Ogoz.

== History ==
The village of Rossens is first mentioned in 1162 as Rossens. It was formerly known by its German name Rossing, however, that name is no longer used.

== Geography ==
Gibloux has an area, (as of the 2004/09 survey) of 36.06 km^{2} (13.92 sq mi). Of this area, about 63.8% is used for agricultural purposes, while 23.9% is forested. Of the rest of the land, 11.6% is settled (buildings or roads) and 0.7% is unproductive land. In the 2013/18 survey a total of 276 ha (680 acres) or about 7.6% of the total area was covered with buildings. Of the agricultural land, 14 ha (35 acres) is used for orchards and vineyards, 2,215 ha (5,470 acres) is fields and grasslands and 53 ha (130 acres) consists of alpine grazing areas. Since 1981 the amount of agricultural land has decreased by 181 ha (450 acres). Over the same time period the amount of forested land has increased by 16 ha (40 acres). Rivers and lakes cover 37 ha (91 acres) in the municipality.

== Demographics ==
Gibloux has a population (as of 31 December 2020) of 7,622. As of 2014, 15.2% of the population are resident foreign nationals. Over the last 4 years (2010-2014) the population has changed at a rate of 13.39%. The birth rate in the municipality, in 2014, was 8.7, while the death rate was 5.0 per thousand residents.

As of 2014, children and teenagers (0–19 years old) make up 25.2% of the population, while adults (20–64 years old) are 62.7% of the population and seniors (over 64 years old) make up 12.1%.

In 2014 there were 2,812 private households in Gibloux with an average household size of 2.58 persons. In 2013 the rate of construction of new housing units per 1000 residents was 7.42. The vacancy rate for the municipality, in 2015, was 1.94%.

== Economy ==
Gibloux is classed as a periurbane community. The municipality is part of the agglomeration of Fribourg.

As of 2016, there were a total of 2,756 people employed in the municipality. Of these, a total of 193 people worked in 82 businesses in the primary economic sector. The secondary sector employed 1,102 workers in 93 separate businesses, of which 385 people worked in 4 large businesses. Finally, the tertiary sector provided 1,461 jobs in 278 businesses, of which 564 people worked in 7 large businesses.

In 2014 a total of 7.4% of the population received social assistance.

== Heritage sites of national significance ==
The ruin of Illens Castle, the Chapel of Notre-Dame and the Church of Saint-Vincent are listed as Swiss heritage site of national significance.

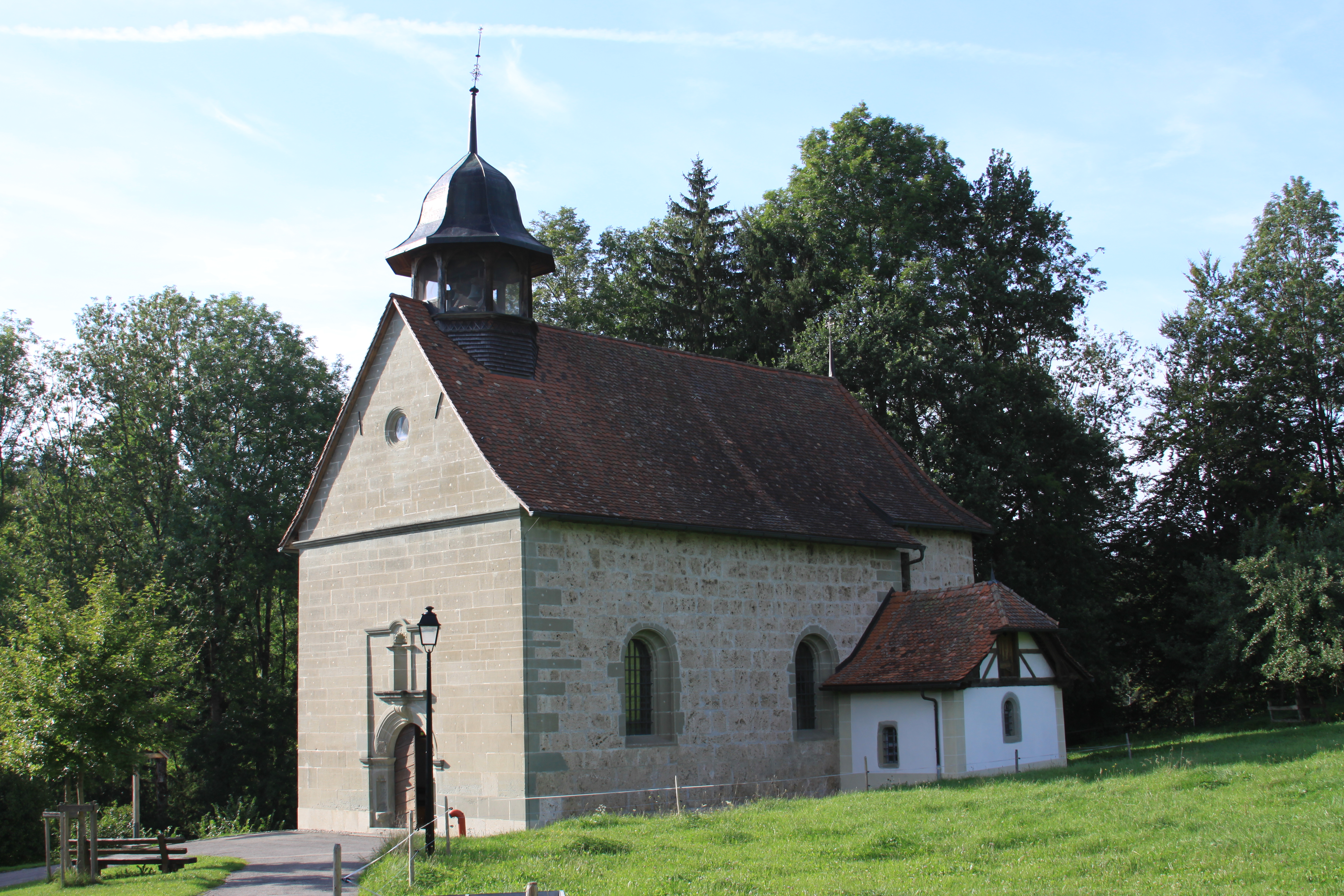
Notre-Dame Chapel

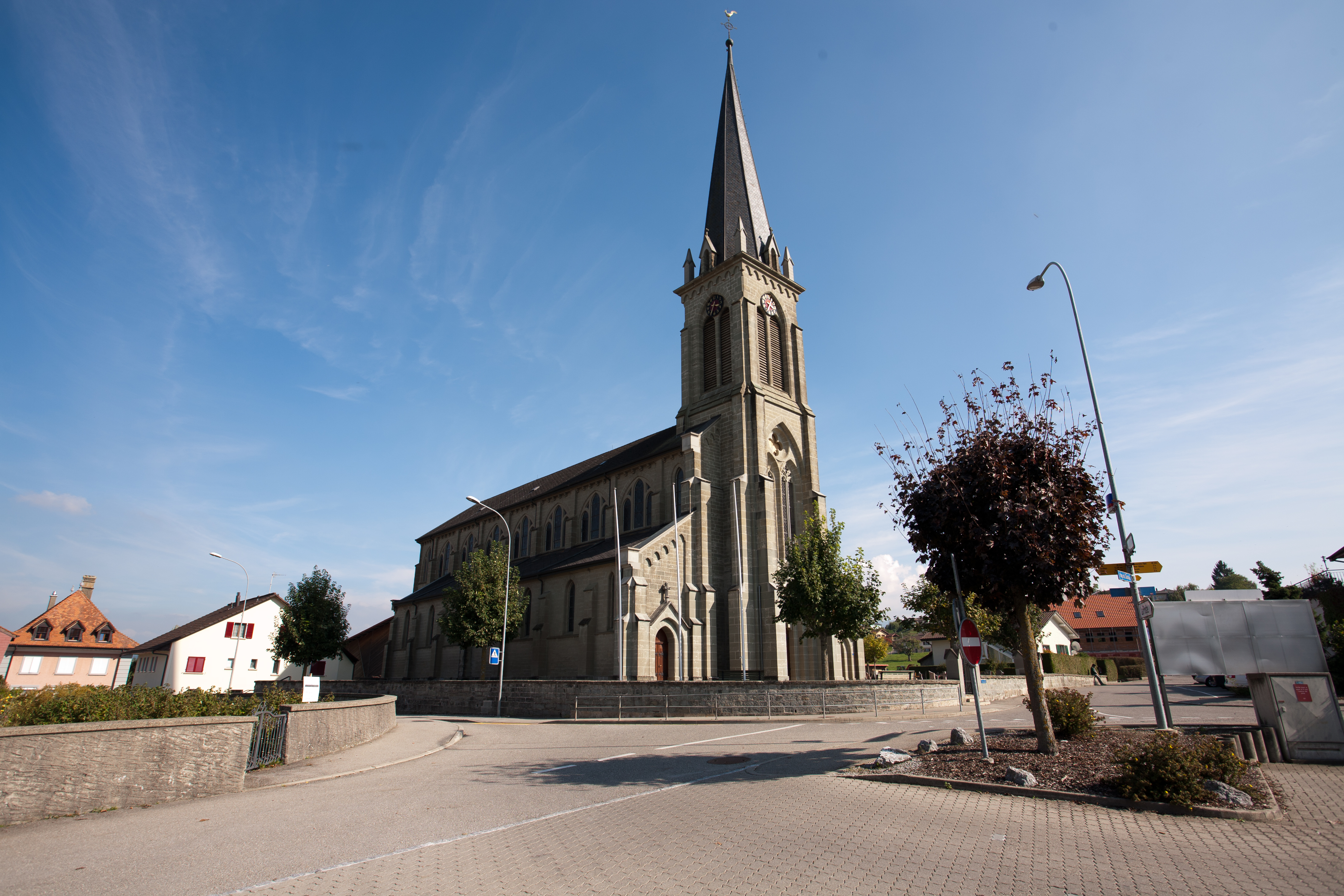
Saint Vincent Church

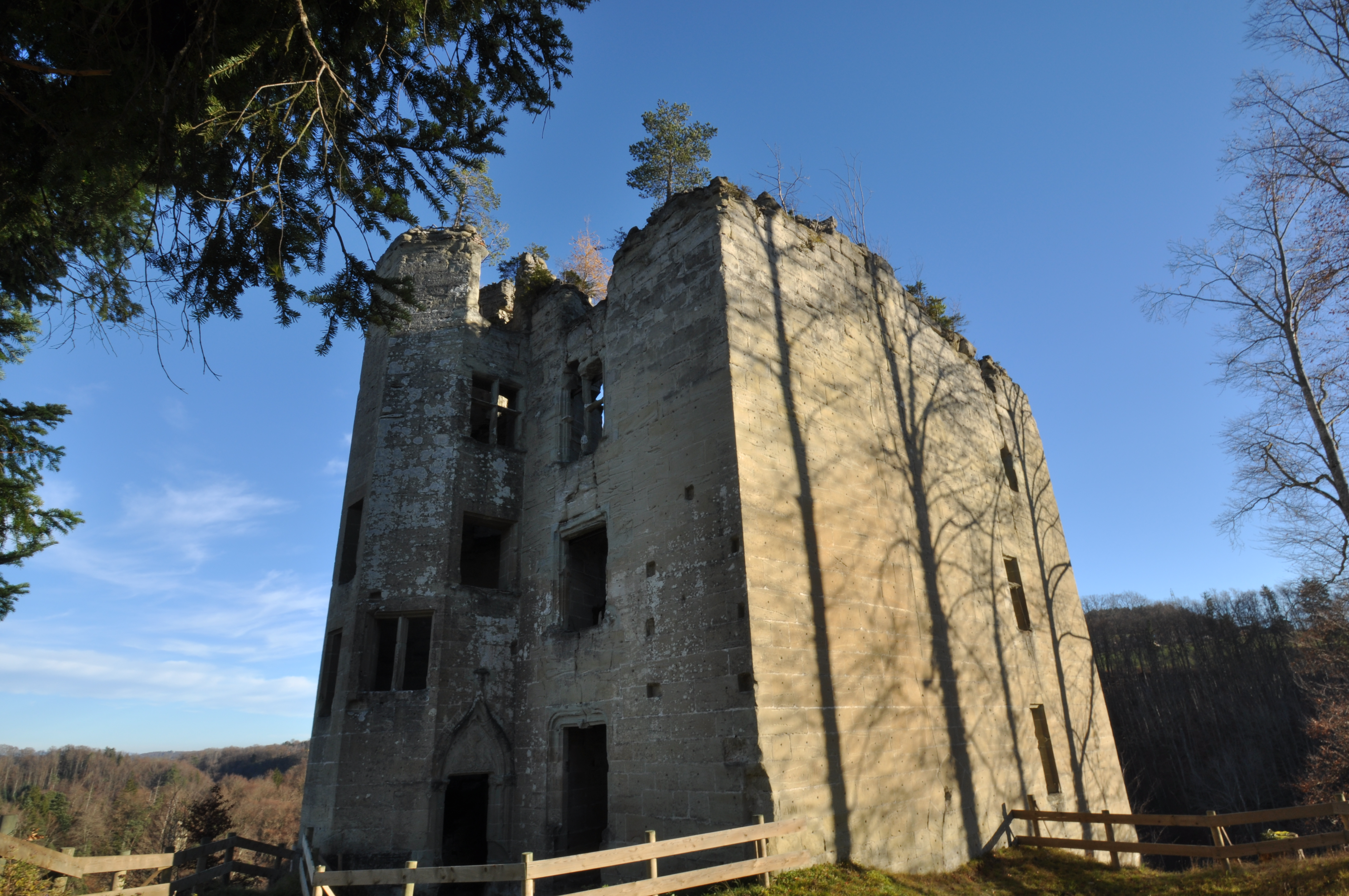
Illens Castle
