= Pont-en-Ogoz =

- Municipality
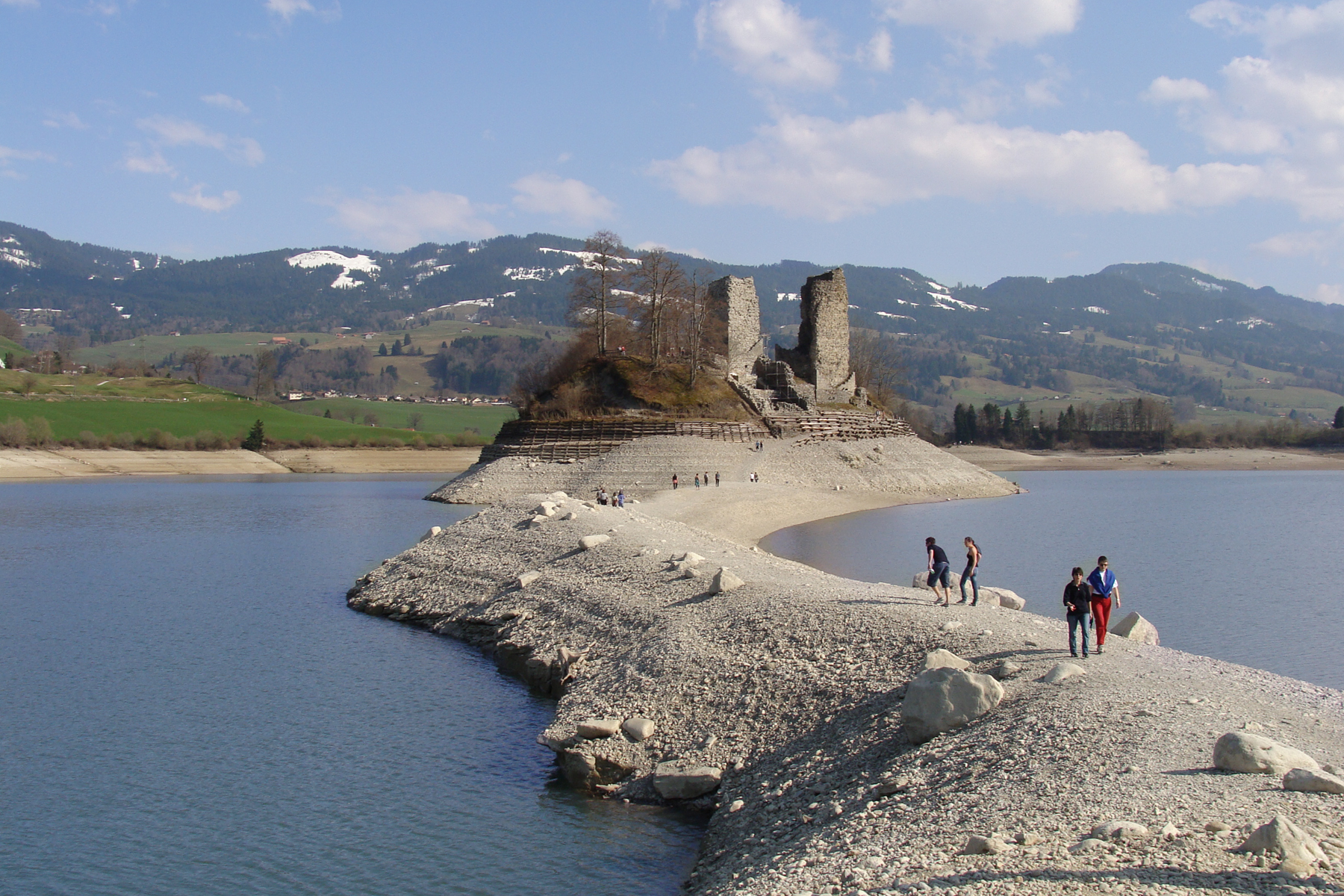
- Ruins of Pont-en-Ogoz Castle

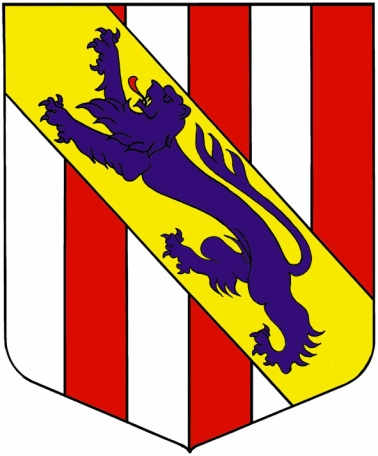
- Coat of arms
- Location of Pont-en-Ogoz
- Location within Switzerland Location within Canton of Fribourg
- Coordinates: 46°41′N 7°5′E
- Country: Switzerland
- Canton: Fribourg
- District: Gruyère

Government
  - Mayor: Syndic

Area
  - Total: 9.95 km^{2} (3.84 sq mi)
- Elevation: 726 m (2,382 ft)

Population (December 2020)
  - Total: 1,951
  - Density: 196/km^{2} (508/sq mi)
- Time zone: UTC+01:00 (CET)
  - Summer (DST): UTC+02:00 (CEST)
- Postal code: 1643-1645
- SFOS number: 2122
- ISO 3166 code: CH-FR
- Surrounded by: Farvagny, Hauteville, Le Glèbe, Marsens, Pont-la-Ville, Rossens, Sorens, Vuisternens-en-Ogoz
- Website: www.pont-en-ogoz.ch

Pont-en-Ogoz (French pronunciation: [pɔ̃.t‿ɑ̃.n‿ɔɡo]) is a municipality in the district of Gruyère in the canton of Fribourg in Switzerland. In 1970 the village of Pont-en-Ogoz merged with Villars-d'Avry into the municipality of Le Bry. Then, in 2003 the municipalities of Le Bry, Avry-devant-Pont and Gumefens merged to form a bigger Pont-en-Ogoz.

== Geography ==
Aerial view (1964)

Pont-en-Ogoz has an area, as of 2009, of 10 square kilometers (3.9 mi^{2}). Of this area, 6.49 km^{2} (2.51 mi^{2}) or 64.8% is used for agricultural purposes, while 2.19 km^{2} (0.85 mi^{2}) or 21.9% is forested. Of the rest of the land, 1.26 km^{2} (0.49 mi^{2}) or 12.6% is settled (buildings or roads) and 0.01 km^{2} (2.5 acres) or 0.1% is unproductive land.

Of the built up area, housing and buildings made up 6.2% and transportation infrastructure made up 5.2%. Out of the forested land, 20.0% of the total land area is heavily forested and 1.9% is covered with orchards or small clusters of trees. Of the agricultural land, 8.7% is used for growing crops and 53.3% is pastures and 1.9% is used for alpine pastures.

It consists of the villages of Pont-en-Ogoz, Villars-d'Avry, Avry-devant-Pont and Gumefens.

== Demographics ==
Pont-en-Ogoz has a population (as of December 2020) of 1,951. As of 2008, 8.2% of the population are resident foreign nationals. Over the last 10 years (2000–2010) the population has changed at a rate of 20.9%. Migration accounted for 14.4%, while births and deaths accounted for 6.6%.

Most of the population (as of 2000) speaks French (392 or 92.5%) as their first language, German is the second most common (23 or 5.4%) and Portuguese is the third (4 or 0.9%).

As of 2008, the population was 51.6% male and 48.4% female. The population was made up of 739 Swiss men (46.2% of the population) and 87 (5.4%) non-Swiss men. There were 721 Swiss women (45.0%) and 54 (3.4%) non-Swiss women. Of the population in the municipality, 104 or about 24.5% were born in Pont-en-Ogoz and lived there in 2000. There were 182 or 42.9% who were born in the same canton, while 60 or 14.2% were born somewhere else in Switzerland, and 44 or 10.4% were born outside of Switzerland.

As of 2000, children and teenagers (0–19 years old) make up 26% of the population, while adults (20–64 years old) make up 64.4% and seniors (over 64 years old) make up 9.6%.

As of 2000, there were 178 people who were single and never married in the municipality. There were 210 married individuals, 12 widows or widowers and 24 individuals who are divorced.

As of 2000, there were 513 private households in the municipality, and an average of 2.6 persons per household. There were 43 households that consist of only one person and 14 households with five or more people. In 2000, a total of 164 apartments (77.0% of the total) were permanently occupied, while 39 apartments (18.3%) were seasonally occupied and 10 apartments (4.7%) were empty. As of 2009, the construction rate of new housing units was 4.4 new units per 1000 residents.

== Heritage sites of national significance ==
The Farm House at Route De La Tour 35 and the ruins of Pont-en-Ogoz Castle and Pont-en-Ogoz Fortress are listed as Swiss heritage site of national significance.

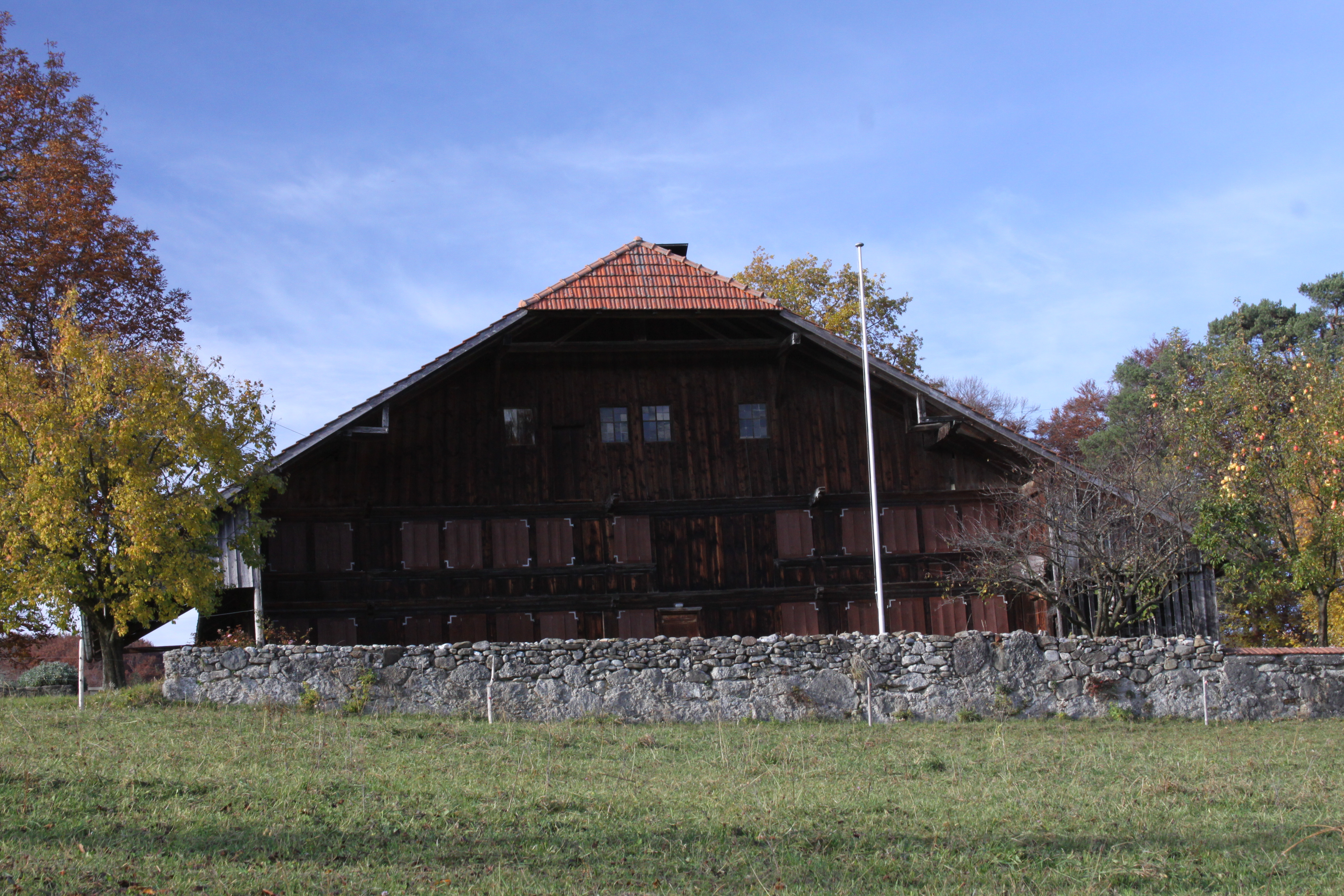
Farm House at Route De La Tour 35

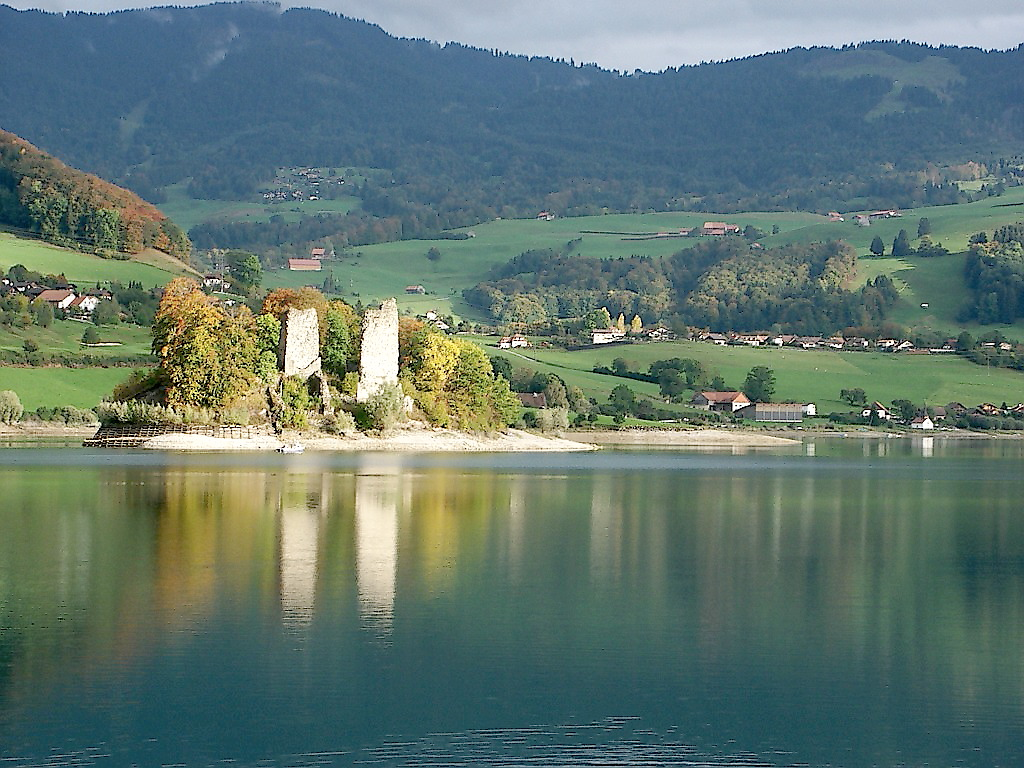
Ruins of Pont-en-Ogoz Castle and Fortress

== Politics ==
In the 2011 federal election the most popular party was the SP which received 31.0% of the vote. The next three most popular parties were the SVP (19.0%), the CVP (18.8%) and the FDP (13.6%).

The SPS improved their position in Pont-en-Ogoz, rising from second to first in 2007 (with 24.9%). The SVP moved from third in 2007 (with 22.3%) to second in 2011, the CVP moved from first in 2007 (with 25.8%) to third and the FDP retained about the same popularity (15.6% in 2007). A total of 528 votes were cast in this election, of which 9 or 1.7% were invalid.

== Economy ==
As of 2010, Pont-en-Ogoz had an unemployment rate of 2.9%. As of 2008, there were 61 people employed in the primary economic sector and about 25 businesses involved in this sector. 25 people were employed in the secondary sector and there were 8 businesses in this sector. 211 people were employed in the tertiary sector, with 40 businesses in this sector. There were 242 residents of the municipality who were employed in some capacity, of which females made up 44.2% of the workforce.

In 2008 the total number of full-time equivalent jobs was 216. The number of jobs in the primary sector was 42, all of which were in agriculture. The number of jobs in the secondary sector was 21 of which 16 or (76.2%) were in manufacturing and 5 (23.8%) were in construction. The number of jobs in the tertiary sector was 153. In the tertiary sector; 40 or 26.1% were in wholesale or retail sales or the repair of motor vehicles, 9 or 5.9% were in the movement and storage of goods, 56 or 36.6% were in a hotel or restaurant, 3 or 2.0% were in the information industry, 1 was the insurance or financial industry, 7 or 4.6% were technical professionals or scientists, 12 or 7.8% were in education and 19 or 12.4% were in health care.

In 2000, there were 114 workers who commuted into the municipality and 182 workers who commuted away. The municipality is a net exporter of workers, with about 1.6 workers leaving the municipality for every one entering. Of the working population, 6.1% used public transportation to get to work, and 75.7% used a private car.

== Religion ==
From the 2000 census, 311 or 73.3% were Roman Catholic, while 28 or 6.6% belonged to the Swiss Reformed Church. Of the rest of the population, there were 16 individuals (or about 3.77% of the population) who belonged to another Christian church. There were 2 (or about 0.47% of the population) who were Islamic. 42 (or about 9.91% of the population) belonged to no church, are agnostic or atheist, and 33 individuals (or about 7.78% of the population) did not answer the question.

== Education ==
In Pont-en-Ogoz about 139 or (32.8%) of the population have completed non-mandatory upper secondary education, and 56 or (13.2%) have completed additional higher education (either university or a Fachhochschule). Of the 56 who completed tertiary schooling, 53.6% were Swiss men, 26.8% were Swiss women, 10.7% were non-Swiss men and 8.9% were non-Swiss women.

The Canton of Fribourg school system provides one year of non-obligatory Kindergarten, followed by six years of Primary school. This is followed by three years of obligatory lower Secondary school where the students are separated according to ability and aptitude. Following the lower Secondary students may attend a three or four year optional upper Secondary school. The upper Secondary school is divided into gymnasium (university preparatory) and vocational programs. After they finish the upper Secondary program, students may choose to attend a Tertiary school or continue their apprenticeship.

During the 2010-11 school year, there were a total of 192 students attending 10 classes in Pont-en-Ogoz. A total of 333 students from the municipality attended any school, either in the municipality or outside of it. There were 2 kindergarten classes with a total of 38 students in the municipality. The municipality had 8 primary classes and 154 students. During the same year, there were no lower secondary classes in the municipality, but 80 students attended lower secondary school in a neighboring municipality. There were no upper Secondary classes or vocational classes, but there were 23 upper Secondary students and 32 upper Secondary vocational students who attended classes in another municipality. The municipality had no non-university Tertiary classes, but there were 2 non-university Tertiary students and 2 specialized Tertiary students who attended classes in another municipality.

As of 2000, there were 9 students in Pont-en-Ogoz who came from another municipality, while 46 residents attended schools outside the municipality.
