= Lake of Gruyère =

Reservoir in Fribourg, Switzerland

- Lac de la Gruyère
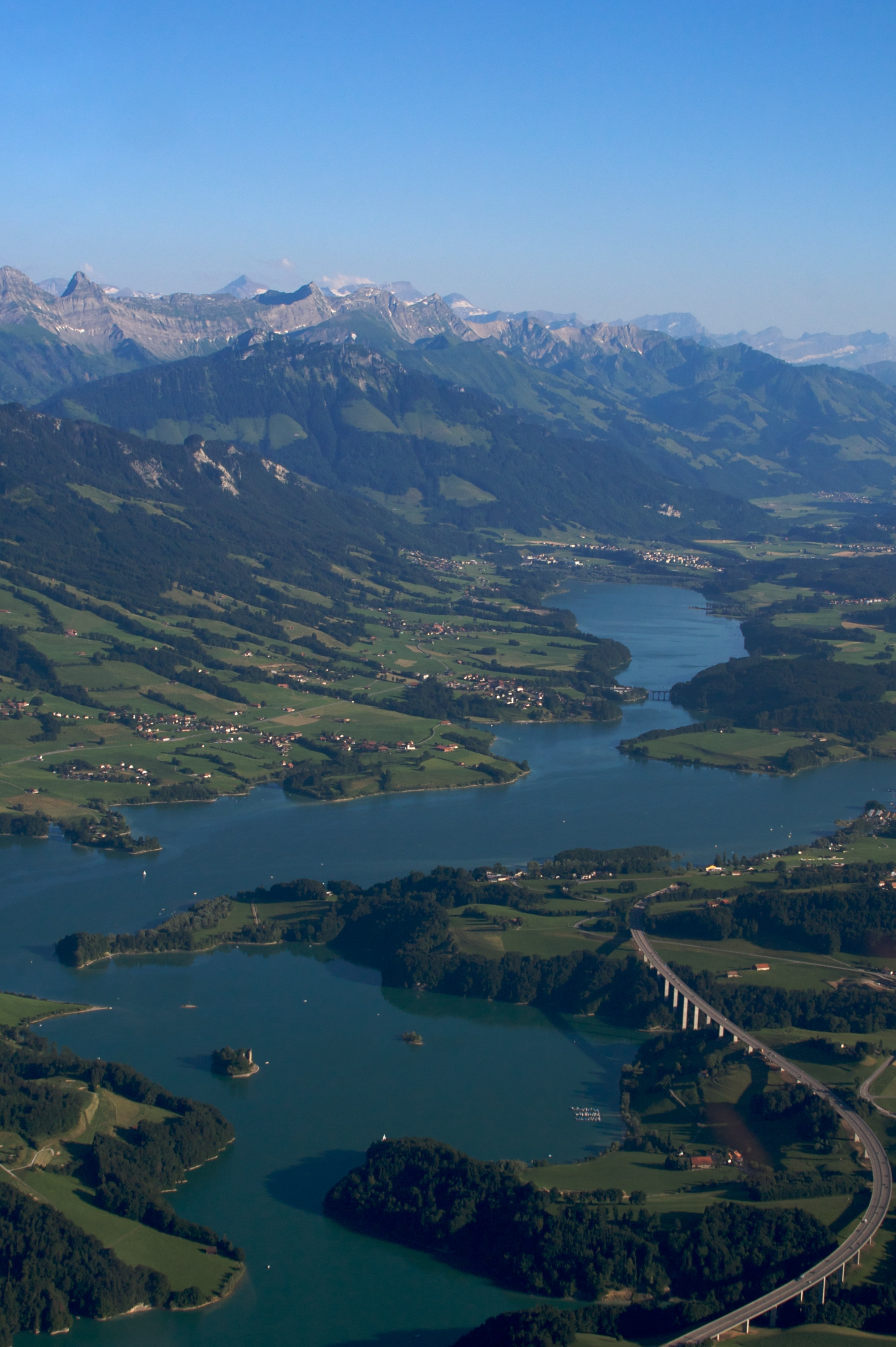

- Location within Canton of Fribourg Location within Switzerland Location within Alps
- Interactive map of Lake of Gruyère
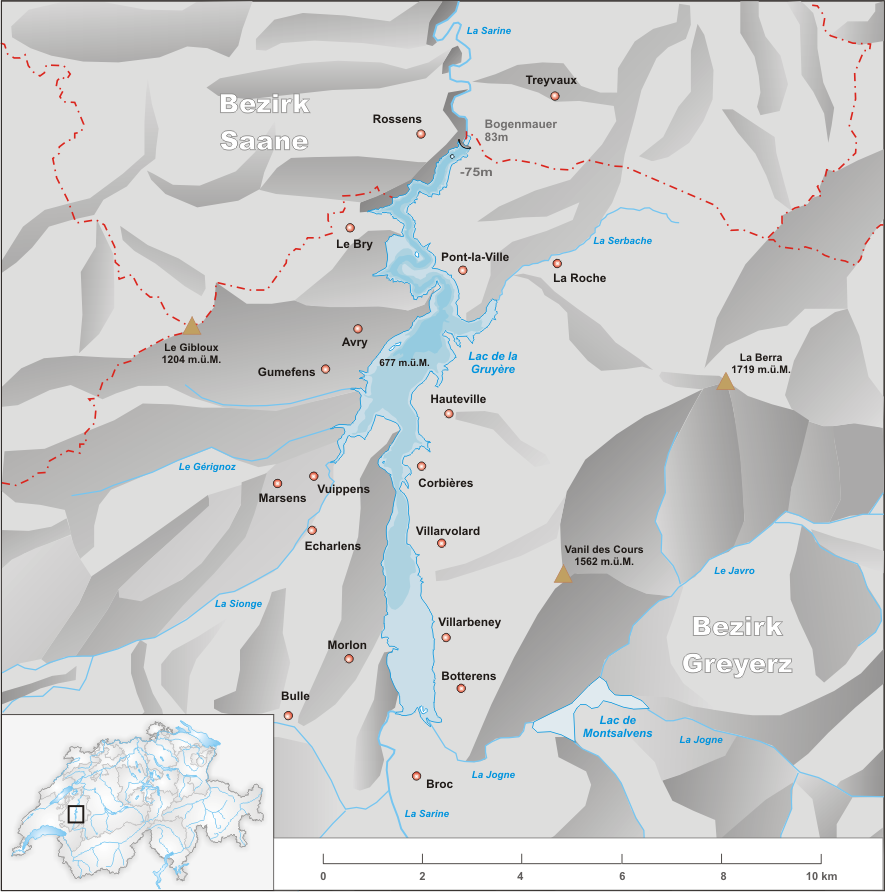
- Map
- Coordinates: 46°39′N 7°06′E
- Type: reservoir
- Primary inflows: Saane/Sarine, Sionge, Jogne
- Primary outflows: Saane/Sarine
- Catchment area: 954 km^{2} (368 sq mi)
- Basin countries: Switzerland
- Max. length: 13.5 km (8.4 mi)
- Surface area: 9.60 km^{2} (3.71 sq mi)
- Max. depth: 75 m (246 ft)
- Water volume: 220×10^{6} m^{3} (180,000 acre⋅ft)
- Surface elevation: 677 m (2,221 ft) (max)
- Islands: Ile d'Ogoz, four other islets
- Settlements: see article

Lake of Gruyère (French: Lac de la Gruyère [lak də la ɡʁɥijɛʁ]; German: Greyerzersee) is an artificial lake in the La Gruyère region of the Canton of Fribourg, Switzerland.

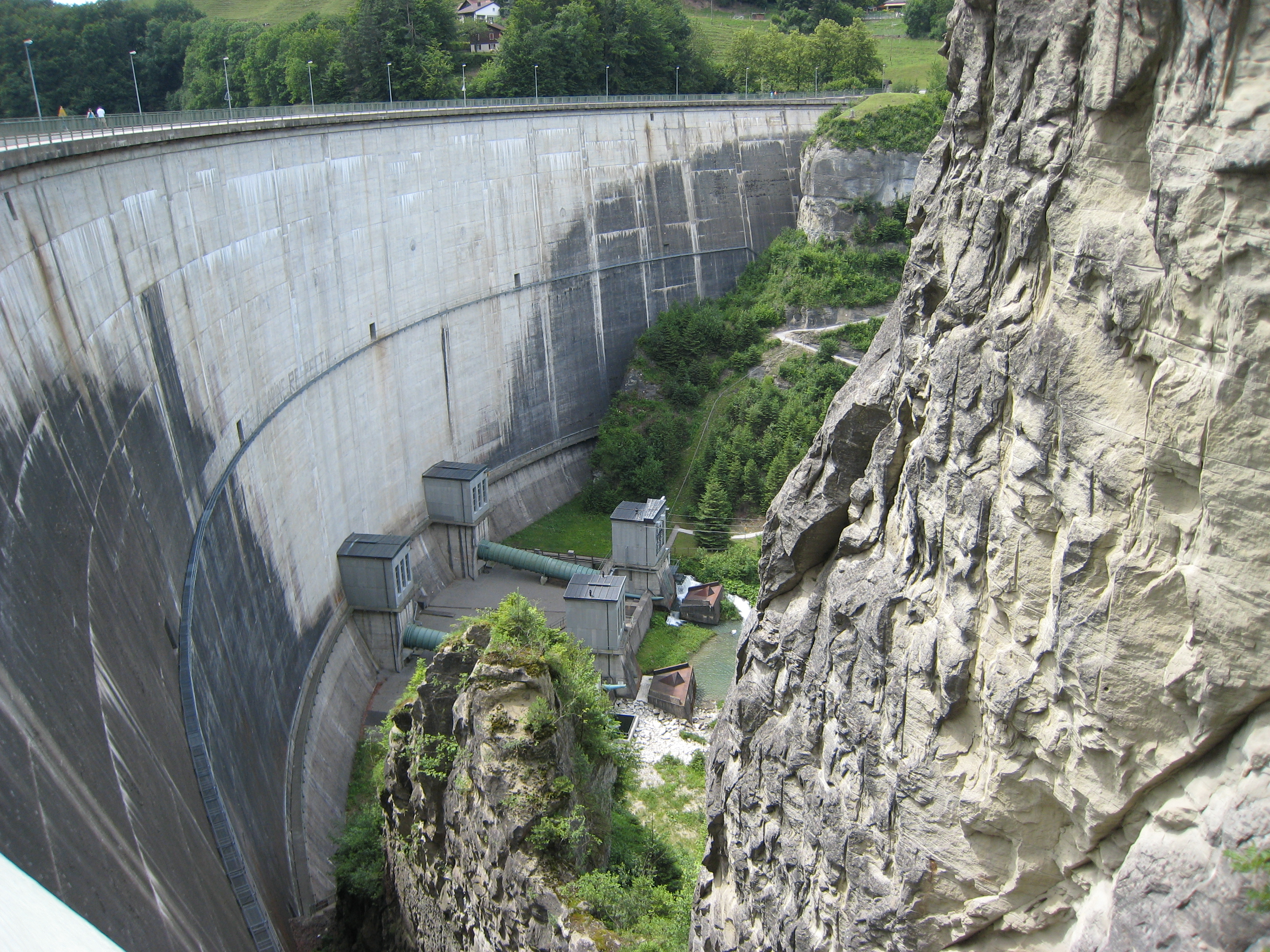
Rossens dam

The reservoir was formed between the cities of Bulle and Fribourg, by building the Rossens Dam on the Sarine river in 1948. The arch dam has a height of 83 m and a crest length of 320 m. The reservoir filled in about four months after completion. The dam is operated by the Groupe E SA.

The remains of the castle of Pont (or Pont-en-Ogoz) and a chapel are located on the Ile d'Ogoz, one of the five islets in the lake.

The "Viaduc du Lac de Gruyère" of the A12 motorway was built in the 1970s. The bridge has a total length of 2043 m and crosses three valleys, including two arms of the lake.

Villages and municipalities at the lake
Western shore	Eastern shore
Rossens; Le Bry (Pont-en-Ogoz); Avry-devant-Pont (Pont-en-Ogoz); Gumefens (Pont-en-Ogoz); Vuippens (Marsens); Le Villars (Marsens); Champotey (Echarlens); Echarlens; Morlon; Le Vessieu (Morlon)	Pont-la-Ville; La Roche; Hauteville; Corbières; Villarvolard; Villarbeney (Botterens); Botterens; Broc

== See also ==
- List of lakes of Switzerland
