= Vuippens =

Former municipality, canton of Fribourg

- Former municipality
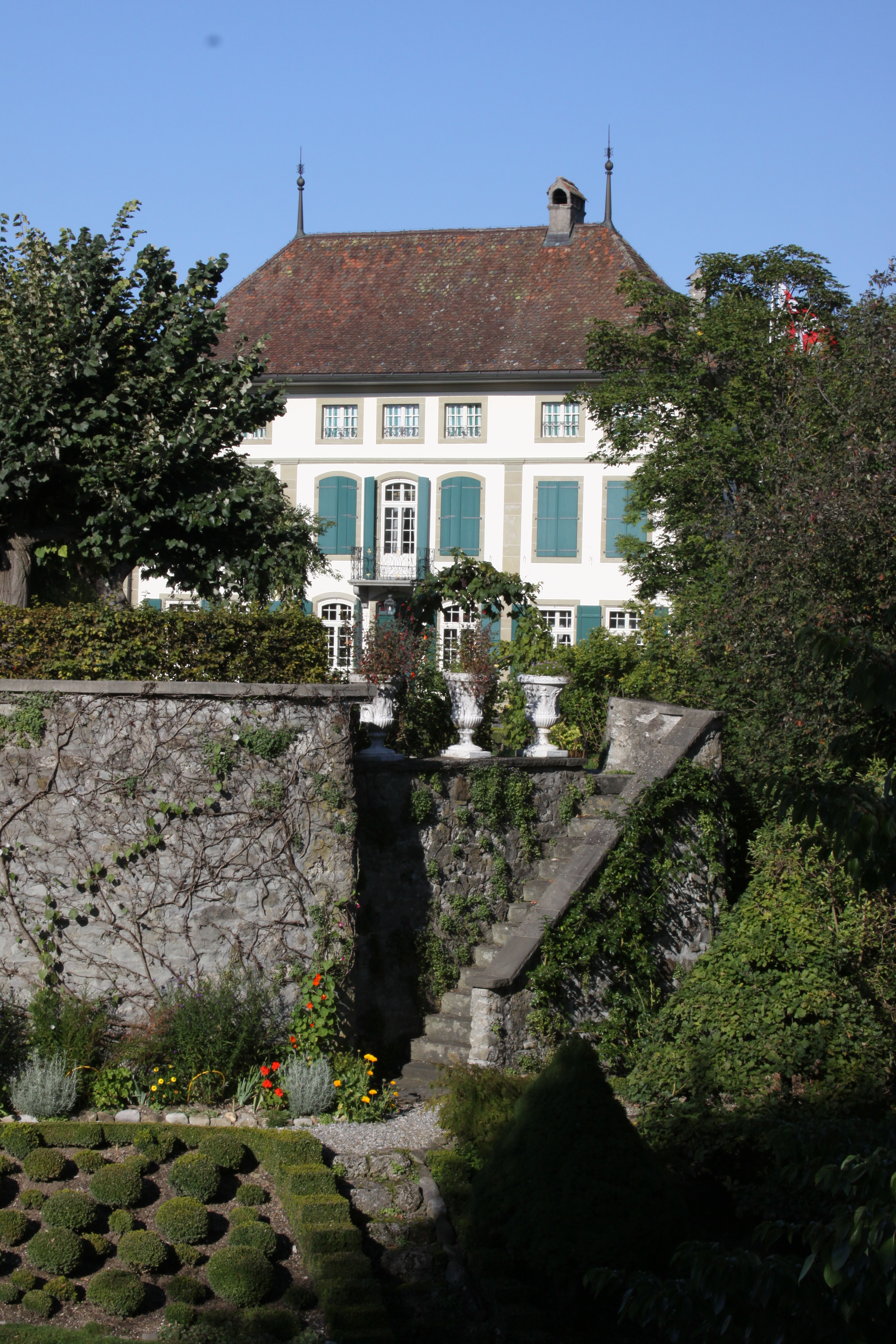
- The former bailiff's castle

- Coat of arms
- Location of Vuippens
- Location within Switzerland Location within Canton of Fribourg
- Coordinates: 46.66°N 7.075°E
- Country: Switzerland
- Canton: Fribourg
- District: Gruyère
- Municipality: Marsens

Population (2000)
  - Total: 251
- Time zone: UTC+01:00 (CET)
  - Summer (DST): UTC+02:00 (CEST)
- ISO 3166 code: CH-FR
- Website

Vuippens (former German name Wippingen) is a former municipality in the Gruyère district of the canton of Fribourg, Switzerland. Since 2001 it has been part of the municipality of Marsens. It lies in the valley of the Sionge, on the left bank of the Lake of Gruyère, on the road from Bulle to Fribourg.

== History ==
Vuippens is first mentioned in 855 as Wippedingus. A Neolithic copper axe has been found there. At La Palaz there was a Gallo-Roman villa (1st–3rd century) with hypocausts, and a 7th-century cemetery (174 graves).

Vuippens belonged to the lordship of Corbières until 1224 and then became the center of its own lordship. One of the ten "towns" of the Gruyère region, it was founded in the middle of the 13th century by Ulrich de Vuippens. In 1349, during the Everdes War, Fribourg, with the help of Bern, burned the small town (bourg) and its castles. Fribourg acquired Vuippens in 1553, and until 1798 it formed a single bailiwick with Everdes. Vuippens still has two privately owned castles: the Boccard castle (16th century) and the former bailiff's castle, heavily altered in 1778.

After the Chenaux uprising (1781) the burghers of Vuippens kept their old liberties without collectively obtaining the citizenship of Fribourg. Vuippens rose against the capital in the revolution of 1798. Under the Helvetic Republic the commune was attached to the district of Bulle.

The parish is recorded in the middle of the 9th century (between 852 and 875); Sorens belonged to it until 1861. The church of Saint Sulpice was rebuilt in 1791 and in 1862. At the beginning of the 21st century Vuippens was a residential and farming village (fodder crops and cattle breeding), with a wastewater treatment plant for the Sionge basin (1987). The A12 motorway (1981) brought a demographic recovery.

Vuippens had 207 inhabitants in 1850, 265 in 1900, 265 in 1950, 208 in 1980 and 251 in 2000.

== Bibliography ==
- J.-J. Dey, "Chronique d'Everdes et de Vuippens", in Mémorial de Fribourg, 2, 1855
- B. de Vevey, Châteaux et maisons fortes du canton de Fribourg, 1978, pp. 323–329
- R. Flückiger, Mittelalterliche Gründungsstädte zwischen Freiburg und Greyerz, 1984, pp. 97–116
- H. Schwab et al., Vuippens-La Palaz, 1997
- A. Philipona and A. Philipona Romanens, Vuippens, 2000
