= Morlon =

- Municipality
- Coat of arms
- Location of Morlon
- Location within Switzerland Location within Canton of Fribourg
- Coordinates: 46°38′N 7°5′E
- Country: Switzerland
- Canton: Fribourg
- District: Gruyère

Government
  - Mayor: Syndic

Area
  - Total: 2.50 km^{2} (0.97 sq mi)
- Elevation: 751 m (2,464 ft)

Population (December 2020)
  - Total: 643
  - Density: 257/km^{2} (666/sq mi)
- Time zone: UTC+01:00 (CET)
  - Summer (DST): UTC+02:00 (CEST)
- Postal code: 1638
- SFOS number: 2143
- ISO 3166 code: CH-FR
- Surrounded by: Botterens, Broc, Bulle, Echarlens, La Tour-de-Trême, Villarbeney, Villarvolard
- Website: http://www.morlon.ch SFSO statistics

Morlon (French: [mɔʁlɔ̃], Franco-Provençal: [mɔʁˈlɔ̃]) is a municipality in the district of Gruyère in the canton of Fribourg in Switzerland.

== History ==
Morlon is first mentioned in 1038 as Mollon. It was first mentioned as Morlon in 1500.

== Geography ==
Morlon has an area, as of 2009, of 2.5 square kilometers (0.97 mi^{2}). Of this area, 1.77 km^{2} (0.68 mi^{2}) or 71.4% is used for agricultural purposes, while 0.42 km^{2} (0.16 mi^{2}) or 16.9% is forested. Of the rest of the land, 0.24 km^{2} (0.093 mi^{2}) or 9.7% is settled (buildings or roads), 0.03 km^{2} (7.4 acres) or 1.2% is either rivers or lakes and 0.03 km^{2} (7.4 acres) or 1.2% is unproductive land.

Of the built up area, housing and buildings made up 7.7% and transportation infrastructure made up 1.6%. Out of the forested land, 15.7% of the total land area is heavily forested and 1.2% is covered with orchards or small clusters of trees. Of the agricultural land, 7.3% is used for growing crops and 63.3% is pastures. Of the water in the municipality, 0.8% is in lakes and 0.4% is in rivers and streams.

The municipality is located in the Gruyère district, at the southern end of the Lake of Gruyère. It consists of the haufendorf village (an irregular, unplanned and quite closely packed village, built around a central square) of Morlon on the Bulle-Fribourg road.

== Coat of arms ==
The blazon of the municipal coat of arms is Per fess Gules a Crane rising Argent and Pally of Six Argent and Gules.

== Demographics ==
Morlon has a population (as of December 2020) of 643. As of 2008, 8.6% of the population are resident foreign nationals. Over the last 10 years (2000–2010) the population has changed at a rate of 21.7%. Migration accounted for 13.1%, while births and deaths accounted for 9.6%.

Most of the population (as of 2000) speaks French (448 or 93.3%) as their first language, German is the second most common (14 or 2.9%) and English is the third (5 or 1.0%). There are 4 people who speak Italian.

As of 2008, the population was 48.6% male and 51.4% female. The population was made up of 268 Swiss men (44.2% of the population) and 27 (4.4%) non-Swiss men. There were 290 Swiss women (47.8%) and 22 (3.6%) non-Swiss women. Of the population in the municipality, 169 or about 35.2% were born in Morlon and lived there in 2000. There were 209 or 43.5% who were born in the same canton, while 37 or 7.7% were born somewhere else in Switzerland, and 53 or 11.0% were born outside of Switzerland.

As of 2000, children and teenagers (0–19 years old) make up 26.3% of the population, while adults (20–64 years old) make up 60% and seniors (over 64 years old) make up 13.8%.

As of 2000, there were 213 people who were single and never married in the municipality. There were 234 married individuals, 20 widows or widowers and 13 individuals who are divorced.

As of 2000, there were 179 private households in the municipality, and an average of 2.6 persons per household. There were 43 households that consist of only one person and 15 households with five or more people. In 2000, a total of 175 apartments (86.6% of the total) were permanently occupied, while 19 apartments (9.4%) were seasonally occupied and 8 apartments (4.0%) were empty.

The historical population is given in the following chart:

== Politics ==
In the 2011 federal election the most popular party was the SVP which received 21.7% of the vote. The next three most popular parties were the SP (21.0%), the FDP (20.9%) and the CVP (19.0%).

The SVP improved their position in Morlon rising to first, from second in 2007 (with 20.1%) The SPS moved from third in 2007 (with 20.0%) to second in 2011, the FDP moved from fourth in 2007 (with 16.4%) to third and the CVP moved from first in 2007 (with 29.4%) to fourth. A total of 207 votes were cast in this election, of which 6 or 2.9% were invalid.

== Economy ==
As of 2010, Morlon had an unemployment rate of 1.4%. As of 2008, there were 25 people employed in the primary economic sector and about 9 businesses involved in this sector. 31 people were employed in the secondary sector and there were 5 businesses in this sector. 63 people were employed in the tertiary sector, with 14 businesses in this sector. There were 252 residents of the municipality who were employed in some capacity, of which females made up 47.6% of the workforce.

In 2008 the total number of full-time equivalent jobs was 94. The number of jobs in the primary sector was 18, of which 14 were in agriculture and 4 were in forestry or lumber production. The number of jobs in the secondary sector was 31 of which 3 or (9.7%) were in manufacturing and 28 (90.3%) were in construction. The number of jobs in the tertiary sector was 45. In the tertiary sector; 6 or 13.3% were in wholesale or retail sales or the repair of motor vehicles, 14 or 31.1% were in a hotel or restaurant, 3 or 6.7% were the insurance or financial industry, 1 was a technical professional or scientist, 1 was in education and 14 or 31.1% were in health care.

In 2000, there were 48 workers who commuted into the municipality and 188 workers who commuted away. The municipality is a net exporter of workers, with about 3.9 workers leaving the municipality for every one entering. Of the working population, 6% used public transportation to get to work, and 72.6% used a private car.

== Religion ==
From the 2000 census, 400 or 83.3% were Roman Catholic, while 27 or 5.6% belonged to the Swiss Reformed Church. Of the rest of the population, there were 7 members of an Orthodox church (or about 1.46% of the population), there were 2 individuals (or about 0.42% of the population) who belonged to the Christian Catholic Church, and there were 9 individuals (or about 1.88% of the population) who belonged to another Christian church. There were 3 (or about 0.63% of the population) who were Islamic. 22 (or about 4.58% of the population) belonged to no church, are agnostic or atheist, and 12 individuals (or about 2.50% of the population) did not answer the question.

== Education ==
In Morlon about 139 or (29.0%) of the population have completed non-mandatory upper secondary education, and 61 or (12.7%) have completed additional higher education (either university or a Fachhochschule). Of the 61 who completed tertiary schooling, 57.4% were Swiss men, 27.9% were Swiss women, 9.8% were non-Swiss men.

The Canton of Fribourg school system provides one year of non-obligatory Kindergarten, followed by six years of Primary school. This is followed by three years of obligatory lower Secondary school where the students are separated according to ability and aptitude. Following the lower Secondary students may attend a three or four year optional upper Secondary school. The upper Secondary school is divided into gymnasium (university preparatory) and vocational programs. After they finish the upper Secondary program, students may choose to attend a Tertiary school or continue their apprenticeship.

During the 2010-11 school year, there were a total of 37 students attending 2 classes in Morlon. A total of 113 students from the municipality attended any school, either in the municipality or outside of it. There was one kindergarten class with a total of 18 students in the municipality. The municipality had one primary class and 19 students. During the same year, there were no lower secondary classes in the municipality, but 17 students attended lower secondary school in a neighboring municipality. There were no upper Secondary classes or vocational classes, but there were 9 upper Secondary students and 19 upper Secondary vocational students who attended classes in another municipality. The municipality had no non-university Tertiary classes, but there was one specialized Tertiary student who attended classes in another municipality.

As of 2000, there were 9 students in Morlon who came from another municipality, while 75 residents attended schools outside the municipality.
