= Île d'Ogoz =

Island in Switzerland

Coordinates: 46°41′54″N 7°06′01″E

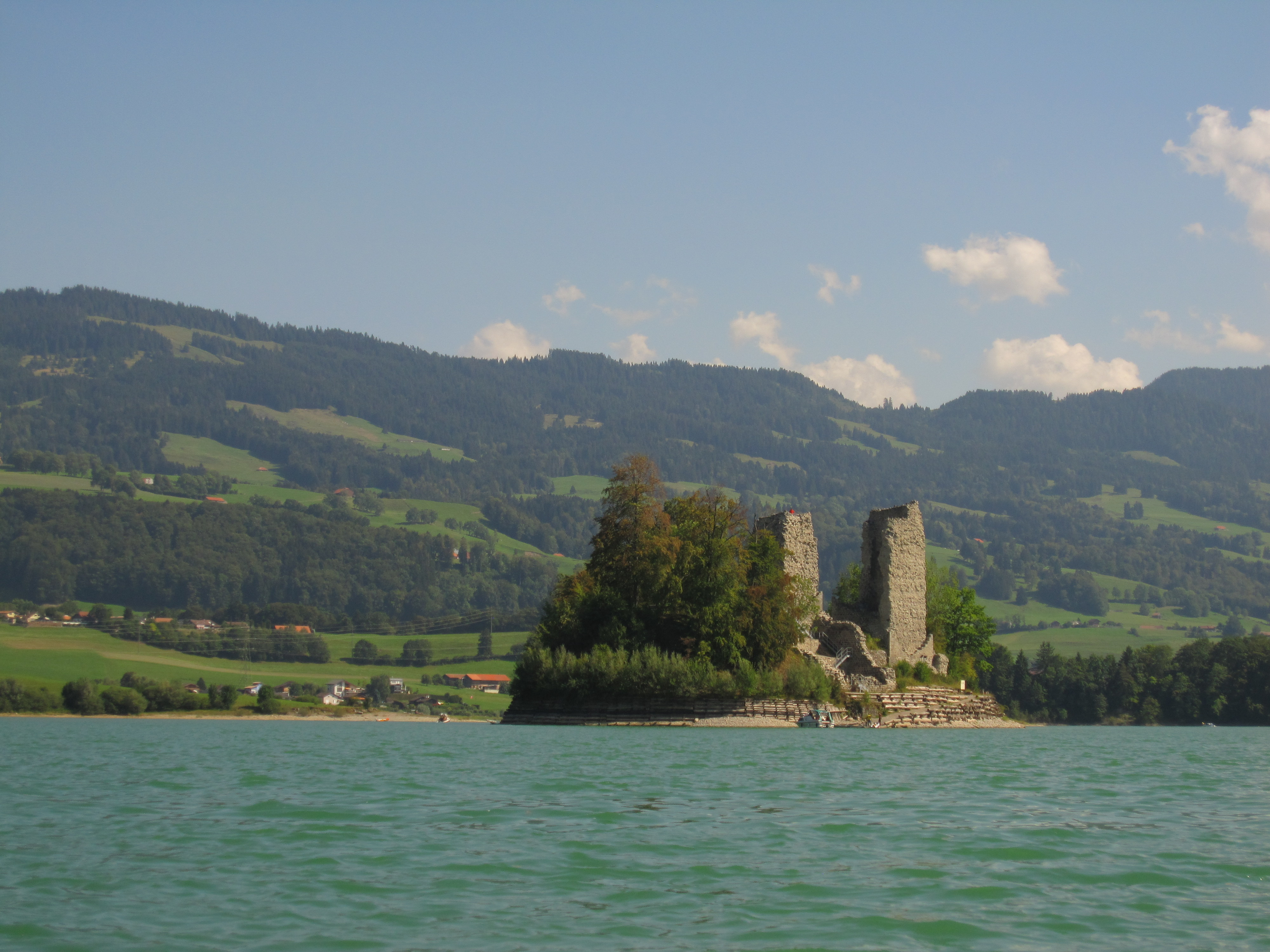
- View from the north side

- Location within Switzerland

Geography
- Location: Lake of Gruyère
- Length: 130 m (430 ft)
- Width: 70 m (230 ft)
- Highest elevation: 688 m (2257 ft)

Administration
- Switzerland
- Canton: Fribourg
- District: Gruyère

The Île d'Ogoz (French pronunciation: [il dɔɡo]; Arpitan: Ila d’Ôgo) is an island in the Lake of Gruyère, located in the canton of Fribourg. It has a length of 130 metres and a width of about 70 metres. Its highest point is 688 metres above sea level or 11 metres above lake level (677 m). The distance from the shore is 160 metres. On the island are a ruined castle and a church.

Before the completion of the Rossens Dam in 1948, it was a promontory overlooking the valley of the Saane/Sarine. It then became an island after the valley was flooded. When the level of the lake is at its lowest, the island becomes a 500-metre-long peninsula accessible to pedestrians.

Politically the island belongs to the municipality of Pont-en-Ogoz in the district of Gruyère.

== See also ==
- List of islands of Switzerland
