= Châtel-sur-Montsalvens =

- Municipality
- Flag Coat of arms
- Location of Châtel-sur-Montsalvens
- Location within Switzerland Location within Canton of Fribourg
- Coordinates: 46°37′N 7°8′E
- Country: Switzerland
- Canton: Fribourg
- District: Gruyère

Government
  - Mayor: Syndic

Area
  - Total: 2.00 km^{2} (0.77 sq mi)
- Elevation: 908 m (2,979 ft)

Population (December 2020)
  - Total: 317
  - Density: 159/km^{2} (411/sq mi)
- Time zone: UTC+01:00 (CET)
  - Summer (DST): UTC+02:00 (CEST)
- Postal code: 1653
- SFOS number: 2128
- ISO 3166 code: CH-FR
- Surrounded by: Botterens, Broc, Crésuz, Villarbeney, Val-de-Charmey
- Website: www.chatel-montsalvens.ch

Châtel-sur-Montsalvens (French: [ʃɑtɛl syʁ mɔ̃salvɑ̃s]; Arpitan: Châthél-sur-Montcèrvins, locally Tsathi-chu-Monthêrvin [tsaˈθi ʃy mɔ̃θɛʁˈvɛ̃]) is a municipality in the district of Gruyère in the canton of Fribourg in Switzerland.

== History ==
Châtel-sur-Montsalvens is first mentioned in 1388 as Chastel propre Montservens.

== Geography ==
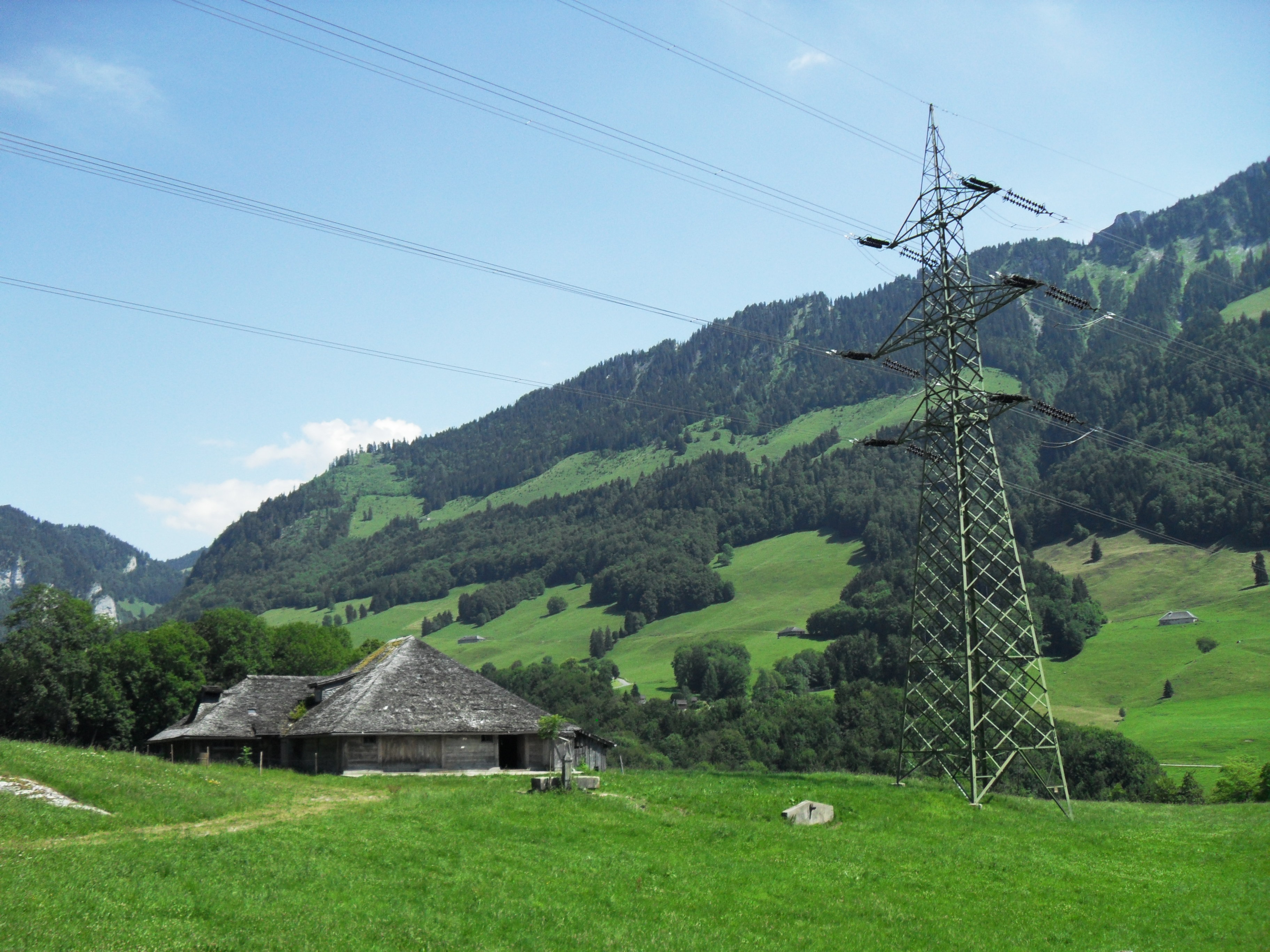
A farm house in Châtel-sur-Montsalvens

Châtel-sur-Montsalvens has an area, as of 2009, of 2 square kilometers (0.77 mi^{2}). Of this area, 0.94 km^{2} (0.36 mi^{2}) or 46.1% is used for agricultural purposes, while 0.85 km^{2} (0.33 mi^{2}) or 41.7% is forested. Of the rest of the land, 0.16 km^{2} (0.062 mi^{2}) or 7.8% is settled (buildings or roads), 0.05 km^{2} (12 acres) or 2.5% is either rivers or lakes.

Of the built up area, housing and buildings made up 3.9% and transportation infrastructure made up 3.4%. Out of the forested land, 36.8% of the total land area is heavily forested and 4.9% is covered with orchards or small clusters of trees. Of the agricultural land, 28.9% is pastures and 17.2% is used for alpine pastures. Of the water in the municipality, 2.0% is in lakes and 0.5% is in rivers and streams.

The municipality is located in the Gruyère district.

== Coat of arms ==
The blazon of the municipal coat of arms is Gules, in base issuant a Wall embattled Argent on it a Crane of the same passant and in chief dexter a Mullet of Five Or.

== Demographics ==
Châtel-sur-Montsalvens has a population (as of December 2020) of 317. As of 2008, 22.2% of the population are resident foreign nationals. Over the last 10 years (2000–2010) the population has changed at a rate of 34.4%. Migration accounted for 22.6%, while births and deaths accounted for 5.4%.

Most of the population (as of 2000) speaks French (171 or 83.4%) as their first language, German is the second most common (18 or 8.8%) and English is the third (7 or 3.4%).

As of 2008, the population was 51.4% male and 48.6% female. The population was made up of 103 Swiss men (40.1% of the population) and 29 (11.3%) non-Swiss men. There were 93 Swiss women (36.2%) and 32 (12.5%) non-Swiss women. Of the population in the municipality, 35 or about 17.1% were born in Châtel-sur-Montsalvens and lived there in 2000. There were 80 or 39.0% who were born in the same canton, while 49 or 23.9% were born somewhere else in Switzerland, and 39 or 19.0% were born outside of Switzerland.

As of 2000, children and teenagers (0–19 years old) make up 23.4% of the population, while adults (20–64 years old) make up 62% and seniors (over 64 years old) make up 14.6%.

As of 2000, there were 87 people who were single and never married in the municipality. There were 99 married individuals, 6 widows or widowers and 13 individuals who are divorced.

As of 2000, there were 84 private households in the municipality, and an average of 2.3 persons per household. There were 22 households that consist of only one person and 4 households with five or more people. In 2000, a total of 74 apartments (56.9% of the total) were permanently occupied, while 47 apartments (36.2%) were seasonally occupied and 9 apartments (6.9%) were empty. As of 2009, the construction rate of new housing units was 24 new units per 1000 residents. The vacancy rate for the municipality, in 2010, was 2.78%.

The historical population is given in the following chart:

== Heritage sites of national significance ==
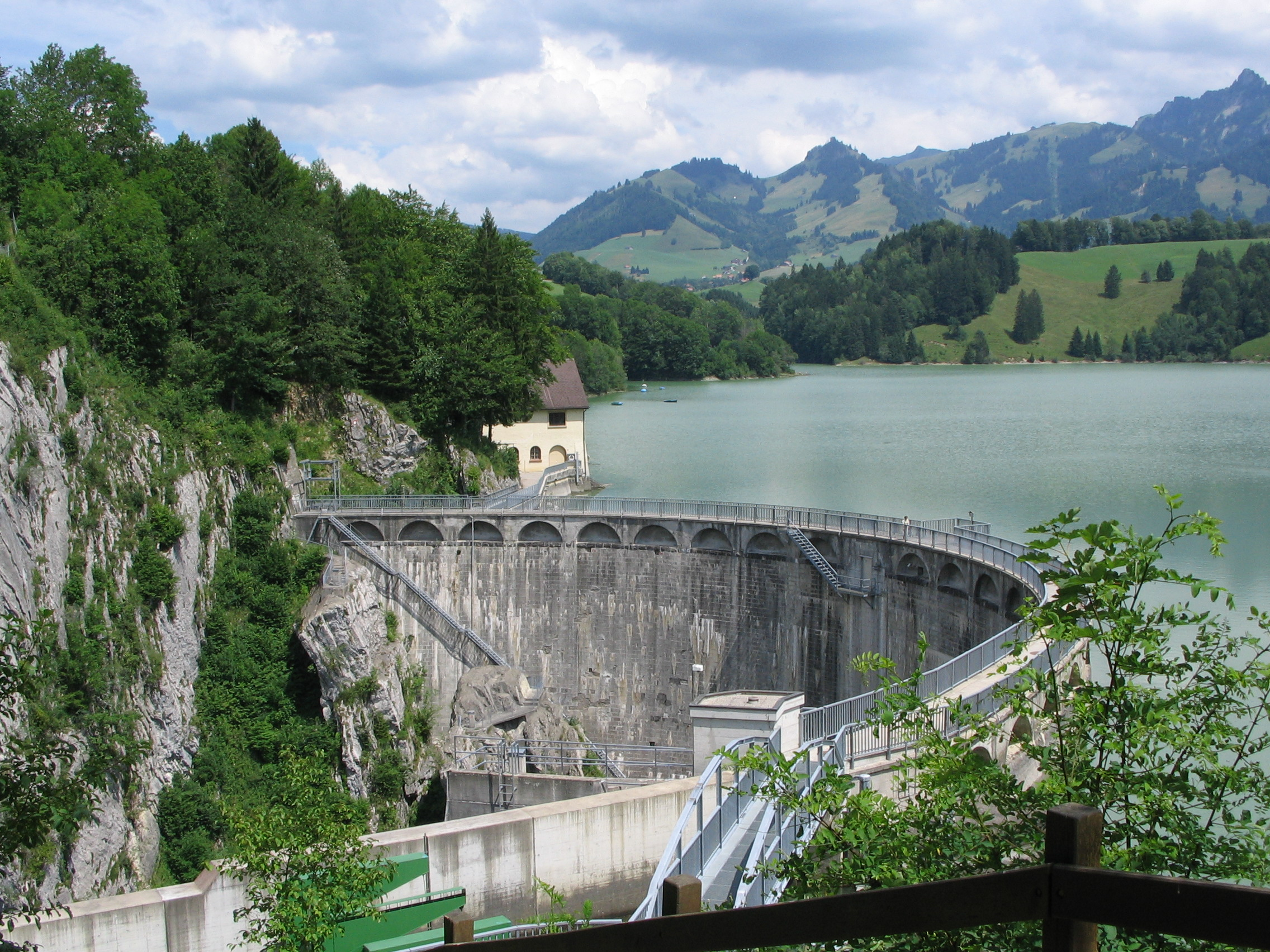
Montsalvens Dam

The Monstalvens Dam (Barrage De Montsalvens) which is shared with Broc is listed as a Swiss heritage site of national significance.

== Politics ==
In the 2011 federal election the most popular party was the SVP which received 31.5% of the vote. The next three most popular parties were the SP (30.1%), the CVP (11.8%) and the FDP (8.5%).

The SVP improved their position in Châtel-sur-Montsalvens rising to first, from second in 2007 (with 26.5%) The SPS moved from third in 2007 (with 22.0%) to second in 2011, the CVP moved from first in 2007 (with 29.7%) to third and the FDP retained about the same popularity (9.3% in 2007). A total of 93 votes were cast in this election, of which 2 or 2.2% were invalid.

== Economy ==
As of 2010, Châtel-sur-Montsalvens had an unemployment rate of 1.7%. As of 2008, there were 7 people employed in the primary economic sector and about 3 businesses involved in this sector. 5 people were employed in the secondary sector and there were 3 businesses in this sector. 8 people were employed in the tertiary sector, with 3 businesses in this sector. There were 104 residents of the municipality who were employed in some capacity, of which females made up 41.3% of the workforce.

In 2008 the total number of full-time equivalent jobs was 16. The number of jobs in the primary sector was 5, all of which were in agriculture. The number of jobs in the secondary sector was 5 of which 2 or (40.0%) were in manufacturing and 3 (60.0%) were in construction. The number of jobs in the tertiary sector was 6. In the tertiary sector; 5 or 83.3% were in a hotel or restaurant, .

In 2000, there were 7 workers who commuted into the municipality and 88 workers who commuted away. The municipality is a net exporter of workers, with about 12.6 workers leaving the municipality for every one entering. Of the working population, 11.5% used public transportation to get to work, and 72.1% used a private car.

== Religion ==
From the 2000 census, 135 or 65.9% were Roman Catholic, while 20 or 9.8% belonged to the Swiss Reformed Church. Of the rest of the population, there were 10 individuals (or about 4.88% of the population) who belonged to another Christian church. There was 1 individual who was Jewish, and 6 (or about 2.93% of the population) who were Islamic. 32 (or about 15.61% of the population) belonged to no church, are agnostic or atheist, and 6 individuals (or about 2.93% of the population) did not answer the question.

== Education ==
In Châtel-sur-Montsalvens about 78 or (38.0%) of the population have completed non-mandatory upper secondary education, and 25 or (12.2%) have completed additional higher education (either university or a Fachhochschule). Of the 25 who completed tertiary schooling, 52.0% were Swiss men, 24.0% were Swiss women.

The Canton of Fribourg school system provides one year of non-obligatory Kindergarten, followed by six years of Primary school. This is followed by three years of obligatory lower Secondary school where the students are separated according to ability and aptitude. Following the lower Secondary students may attend a three or four year optional upper Secondary school. The upper Secondary school is divided into gymnasium (university preparatory) and vocational programs. After they finish the upper Secondary program, students may choose to attend a Tertiary school or continue their apprenticeship.

During the 2010-11 school year, there were no students attending school in Châtel-sur-Montsalvens, but a total of 39 students attended school in other municipalities. Of these students, 4 were in kindergarten, 16 were in a primary school, 6 were in a mandatory secondary school, one was in an upper secondary school and 10 were in a vocational secondary program. There were a total of 2 tertiary students from Châtel-sur-Montsalvens.

As of 2000, there were 31 students from Châtel-sur-Montsalvens who attended schools outside the municipality.
