= Botterens =

- Municipality
- Flag Coat of arms
- Location of Botterens
- Location within Switzerland Location within Canton of Fribourg
- Coordinates: 46°37′N 7°7′E
- Country: Switzerland
- Canton: Fribourg
- District: Gruyère

Government
  - Mayor: Syndic

Area
  - Total: 4.15 km^{2} (1.60 sq mi)
- Elevation: 744 m (2,441 ft)

Population (December 2020)
  - Total: 670
  - Density: 160/km^{2} (420/sq mi)
- Time zone: UTC+01:00 (CET)
  - Summer (DST): UTC+02:00 (CEST)
- Postal code: 1652
- SFOS number: 2123
- ISO 3166 code: CH-FR
- Surrounded by: Broc, Châtel-sur-Montsalvens, Morlon, Villarbeney, Val-de-Charmey
- Website: https://www.botterens.ch/ SFSO statistics

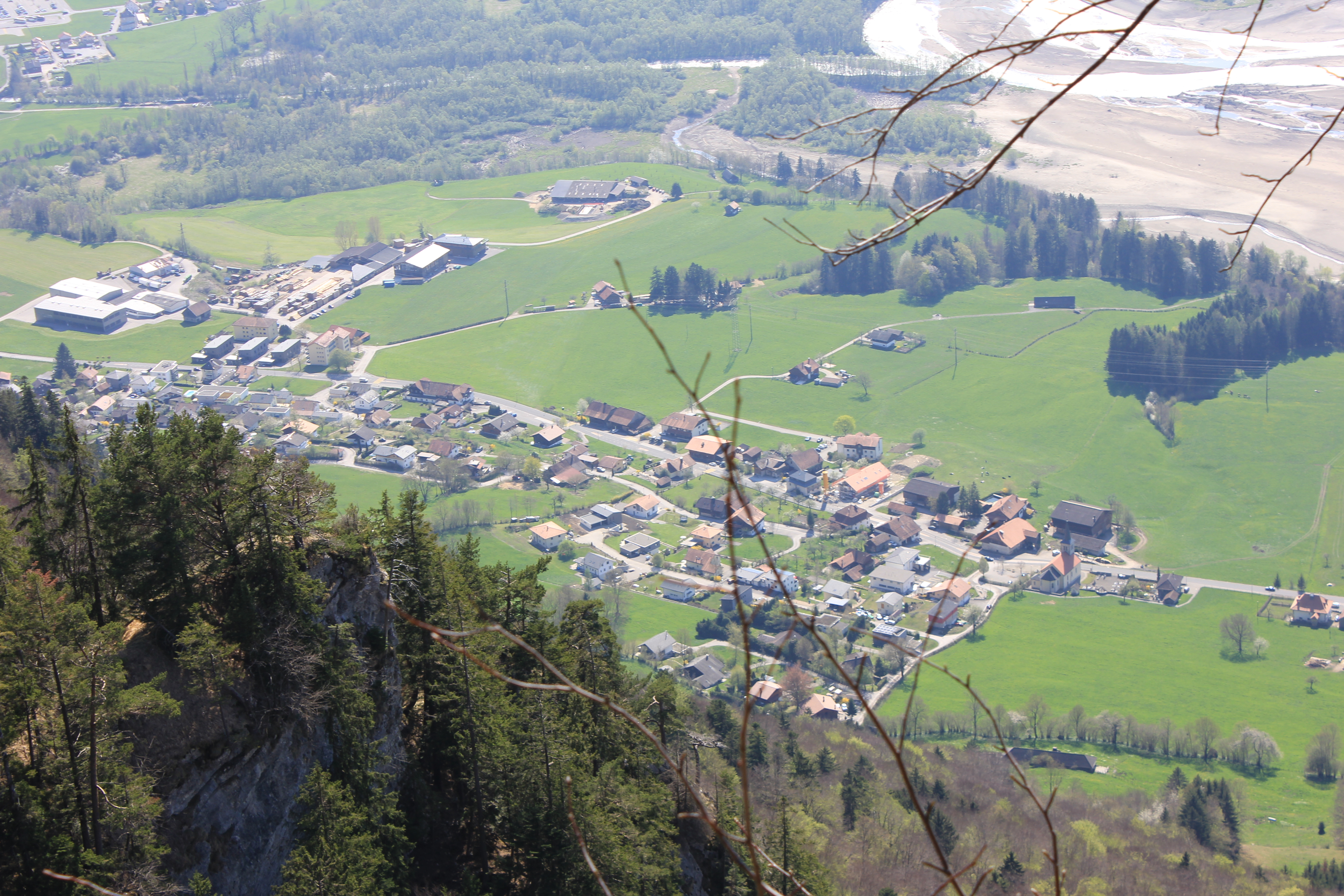
Botterens

Botterens (Arpitan: Boterens, locally Botèrin [botɛˈʁɛ̃]) is a municipality in the district of Gruyère in the canton of Fribourg in Switzerland.

== History ==
Botterens is first mentioned in 1227 as Botterens. The municipality was formerly known by its German name Botteringen, however, that name is no longer used.

== Geography ==
Botterens has an area, as of 2009, of 4.2 square kilometers (1.6 mi^{2}). Of this area, 1.46 km^{2} (0.56 mi^{2}) or 35.2% is used for agricultural purposes, while 2.26 km^{2} (0.87 mi^{2}) or 54.5% is forested. Of the rest of the land, 0.38 km^{2} (0.15 mi^{2}) or 9.2% is settled (buildings or roads) and 0.07 km^{2} (17 acres) or 1.7% is unproductive land.

Of the built up area, housing and buildings made up 4.8% and transportation infrastructure made up 1.4%. Power and water infrastructure as well as other special developed areas made up 2.7% of the area Out of the forested land, 50.4% of the total land area is heavily forested and 4.1% is covered with orchards or small clusters of trees. Of the agricultural land, 1.0% is used for growing crops and 24.6% is pastures and 8.9% is used for alpine pastures. Of the unproductive areas, and 1.2% is too rocky for vegetation.

The municipality is located in the Greyerz district, on the right bank of Lake Gruyère. It consists of the linear village of Botterens.

On 1 January 2006 the former municipality of Villarbeney merged into the municipality of Botterens.

== Coat of arms ==
The blazon of the municipal coat of arms is Gules a Bendlet Argent, overall on Coupeaux Vert a Chamois statant proper with head Or, hoofed and attired Sable.

== Demographics ==
Botterens has a population (as of December 2020) of 670. As of 2008, 6.9% of the population are resident foreign nationals. Over the last 10 years (2000–2010) the population has changed at a rate of 20.5%. Migration accounted for 21%, while births and deaths accounted for 7.2%.

Most of the population (as of 2000) speaks French (263 or 94.3%) as their first language, German is the second most common (9 or 3.2%) and Italian is the third (2 or 0.7%).

As of 2008, the population was 50.6% male and 49.4% female. The population was made up of 218 Swiss men (47.0% of the population) and 17 (3.7%) non-Swiss men. There were 214 Swiss women (46.1%) and 15 (3.2%) non-Swiss women. Of the population in the municipality, 91 or about 32.6% were born in Botterens and lived there in 2000. There were 127 or 45.5% who were born in the same canton, while 31 or 11.1% were born somewhere else in Switzerland, and 23 or 8.2% were born outside of Switzerland.

As of 2000, children and teenagers (0–19 years old) make up 24.7% of the population, while adults (20–64 years old) make up 63% and seniors (over 64 years old) make up 12.2%.

As of 2000, there were 114 people who were single and never married in the municipality. There were 135 married individuals, 13 widows or widowers and 17 individuals who are divorced.

As of 2000, there were 156 private households in the municipality, and an average of 2.4 persons per household. There were 31 households that consist of only one person and 7 households with five or more people. In 2000, a total of 101 apartments (77.7% of the total) were permanently occupied, while 20 apartments (15.4%) were seasonally occupied and 9 apartments (6.9%) were empty. As of 2009, the construction rate of new housing units was 6.4 new units per 1000 residents.

The historical population is given in the following chart:

== Politics ==
In the 2011 federal election the most popular party was the SVP which received 35.3% of the vote. The next three most popular parties were the SP (27.5%), the CVP (17.0%) and the FDP (9.7%).

The SVP received about the same percentage of the vote as they did in the 2007 Federal election (31.8% in 2007 vs 35.3% in 2011). The SPS moved from third in 2007 (with 25.7%) to second in 2011, the CVP moved from second in 2007 (with 27.1%) to third and the FDP retained about the same popularity (8.3% in 2007). A total of 166 votes were cast in this election, of which 1 or 0.6% was invalid.

== Economy ==
As of 2010, Botterens had an unemployment rate of 1.2%. As of 2008, there were 22 people employed in the primary economic sector and about 6 businesses involved in this sector. 87 people were employed in the secondary sector and there were 10 businesses in this sector. 17 people were employed in the tertiary sector, with 6 businesses in this sector. There were 147 residents of the municipality who were employed in some capacity, of which females made up 42.9% of the workforce.

In 2008 the total number of full-time equivalent jobs was 106. The number of jobs in the primary sector was 14, all of which were in agriculture. The number of jobs in the secondary sector was 79 of which 54 or (68.4%) were in manufacturing and 25 (31.6%) were in construction. The number of jobs in the tertiary sector was 13. In the tertiary sector; 5 or 38.5% were in wholesale or retail sales or the repair of motor vehicles, 6 or 46.2% were in a hotel or restaurant.

In 2000, there were 19 workers who commuted into the municipality and 114 workers who commuted away. The municipality is a net exporter of workers, with about 6.0 workers leaving the municipality for every one entering. Of the working population, 4% used public transportation to get to work, and 79.4% used a private car.

== Religion ==
From the 2000 census, 236 or 84.6% were Roman Catholic, while 17 or 6.1% belonged to the Swiss Reformed Church. Of the rest of the population, there was 1 member of an Orthodox church, and there was 1 individual who belongs to another Christian church. There were 2 (or about 0.72% of the population) who were Islamic. 17 (or about 6.09% of the population) belonged to no church, are agnostic or atheist, and 5 individuals (or about 1.79% of the population) did not answer the question.

== Education ==
In Botterens about 103 or (36.9%) of the population have completed non-mandatory upper secondary education, and 24 or (8.6%) have completed additional higher education (either university or a Fachhochschule). Of the 24 who completed tertiary schooling, 66.7% were Swiss men, 16.7% were Swiss women.

The Canton of Fribourg school system provides one year of non-obligatory Kindergarten, followed by six years of Primary school. This is followed by three years of obligatory lower Secondary school where the students are separated according to ability and aptitude. Following the lower Secondary students may attend a three or four year optional upper Secondary school. The upper Secondary school is divided into gymnasium (university preparatory) and vocational programs. After they finish the upper Secondary program, students may choose to attend a Tertiary school or continue their apprenticeship.

During the 2010-11 school year, there were no students attending school in Botterens, but a total of 84 students attended school in other municipalities. 17 students attended kindergarten in a neighboring municipality and 33 students attended primary school in a neighboring municipality. 15 students attended lower secondary school, 5 upper Secondary students and 14 upper Secondary vocational students all attended classes in another municipality.

As of 2000, there were 45 students from Botterens who attended schools outside the municipality.
