= Gibloux Radio Tower =

In Switzerland

Coordinates: 46°41′2.84″N 7°2′25.06″E

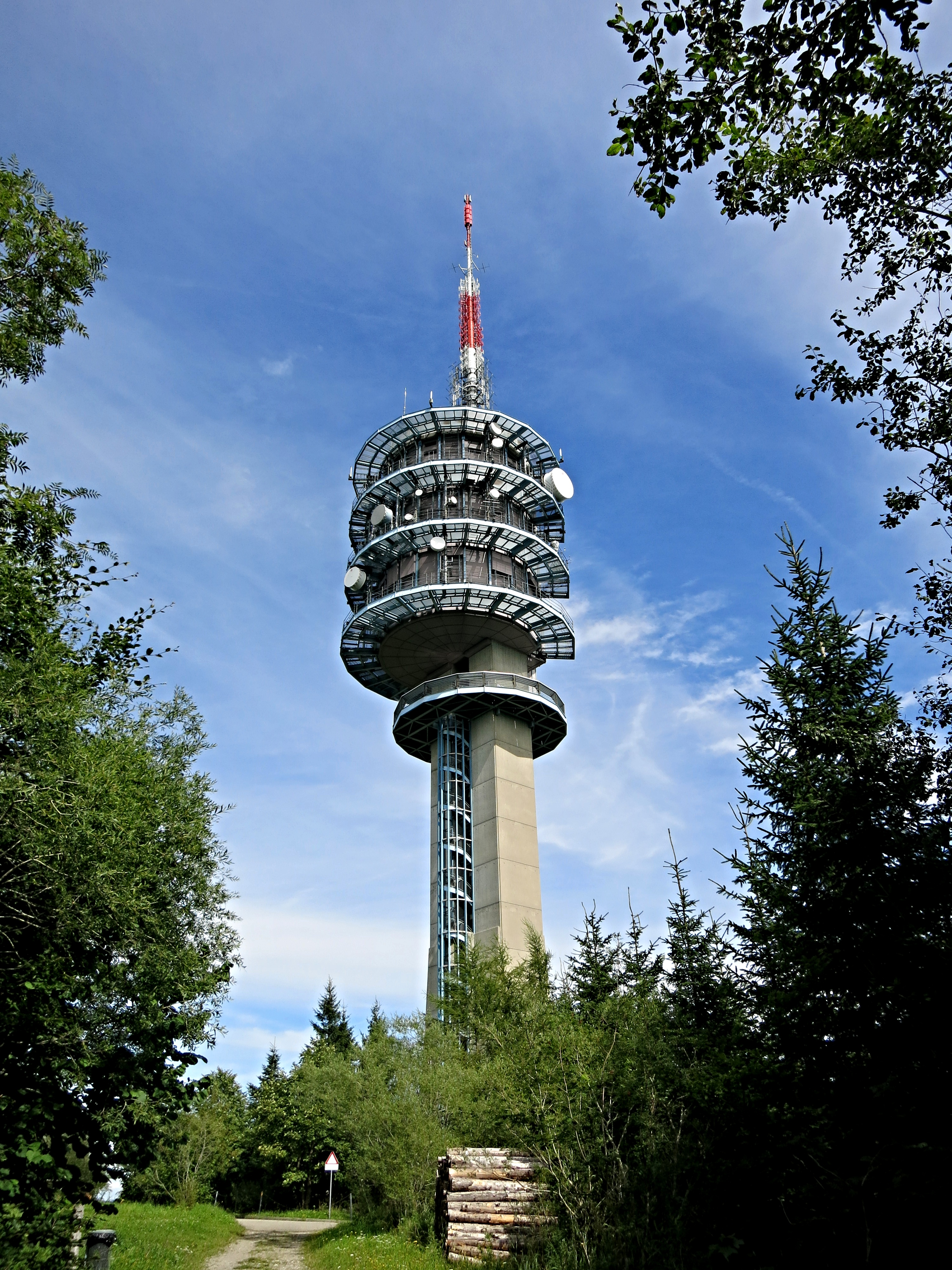
Mont Gibloux Sendeturm

Gibloux Radio Tower is built on the 1204 metre Le Gibloux mountain above Sorens, west of Fribourg, Switzerland. The concrete tower has a height of 118.7 m (389 ft). The observation deck is at 37 m (121 ft).
