= Echarlens =

- Municipality
- Flag Coat of arms
- Location of Echarlens
- Location within Switzerland Location within Canton of Fribourg
- Coordinates: 46°39′N 7°4′E
- Country: Switzerland
- Canton: Fribourg
- District: Gruyère

Government
  - Mayor: Syndic

Area
  - Total: 4.61 km^{2} (1.78 sq mi)
- Elevation: 716 m (2,349 ft)

Population (December 2020)
  - Total: 847
  - Density: 184/km^{2} (476/sq mi)
- Time zone: UTC+01:00 (CET)
  - Summer (DST): UTC+02:00 (CEST)
- Postal code: 1646
- SFOS number: 2131
- ISO 3166 code: CH-FR
- Surrounded by: Bulle, Corbières, Marsens, Morlon, Riaz, Villarbeney, Villarvolard, Vuadens
- Website: www.echarlens.ch

Echarlens (French: [eʃaʁlɑ̃s]; Arpitan: Echàrlens, locally Tsèrlin [tsɛʁˈlɛ̃]) is a municipality in the district of Gruyère in the canton of Fribourg in Switzerland.

== History ==
Echarlens is first mentioned in 855 as Escarlingus or Escarlinges.

== Geography ==
Echarlens has an area, as of 2009, of 4.6 square kilometers (1.8 mi^{2}). Of this area, 3.46 km^{2} (1.34 mi^{2}) or 74.7% is used for agricultural purposes, while 0.63 km^{2} (0.24 mi^{2}) or 13.6% is forested. Of the rest of the land, 0.44 km^{2} (0.17 mi^{2}) or 9.5% is settled (buildings or roads), 0.01 km^{2} (2.5 acres) or 0.2% is either rivers or lakes and 0.07 km^{2} (17 acres) or 1.5% is unproductive land.

Of the built up area, housing and buildings made up 6.5% and transportation infrastructure made up 2.6%. Out of the forested land, 11.9% of the total land area is heavily forested and 1.7% is covered with orchards or small clusters of trees. Of the agricultural land, 20.5% is used for growing crops and 46.9% is pastures and 7.1% is used for alpine pastures. All the water in the municipality is flowing water.

The municipality is located in the Gruyère district. It consists of the village of Echarlens near the A12 motorway and the Bulle-Fribourg road.

== Coat of arms ==
The blazon of the municipal coat of arms is Pally of Six Argent and Gules overall in chief a Mullet of Five Or.

== Demographics ==
Echarlens has a population (as of December 2020) of 847. As of 2008, 11.9% of the population are resident foreign nationals. Over the last 10 years (2000–2010) the population has changed at a rate of 20.6%. Migration accounted for 17.8%, while births and deaths accounted for 5.9%.

Most of the population (as of 2000) speaks French (510 or 92.4%) as their first language, German is the second most common (18 or 3.3%) and Portuguese is the third (12 or 2.2%). There are 2 people who speak Italian and 1 person who speaks Romansh.

As of 2008, the population was 49.7% male and 50.3% female. The population was made up of 294 Swiss men (42.7% of the population) and 48 (7.0%) non-Swiss men. There were 313 Swiss women (45.5%) and 33 (4.8%) non-Swiss women. Of the population in the municipality, 161 or about 29.2% were born in Echarlens and lived there in 2000. There were 232 or 42.0% who were born in the same canton, while 71 or 12.9% were born somewhere else in Switzerland, and 67 or 12.1% were born outside of Switzerland.

As of 2000, children and teenagers (0–19 years old) make up 26.3% of the population, while adults (20–64 years old) make up 63.4% and seniors (over 64 years old) make up 10.3%.

As of 2000, there were 224 people who were single and never married in the municipality. There were 281 married individuals, 23 widows or widowers and 24 individuals who are divorced.

As of 2000, there were 207 private households in the municipality, and an average of 2.6 persons per household. There were 57 households that consist of only one person and 17 households with five or more people. In 2000, a total of 191 apartments (90.5% of the total) were permanently occupied, while 15 apartments (7.1%) were seasonally occupied and 5 apartments (2.4%) were empty. As of 2009, the construction rate of new housing units was 10 new units per 1000 residents.

The historical population is given in the following chart:

== Heritage sites of national significance ==
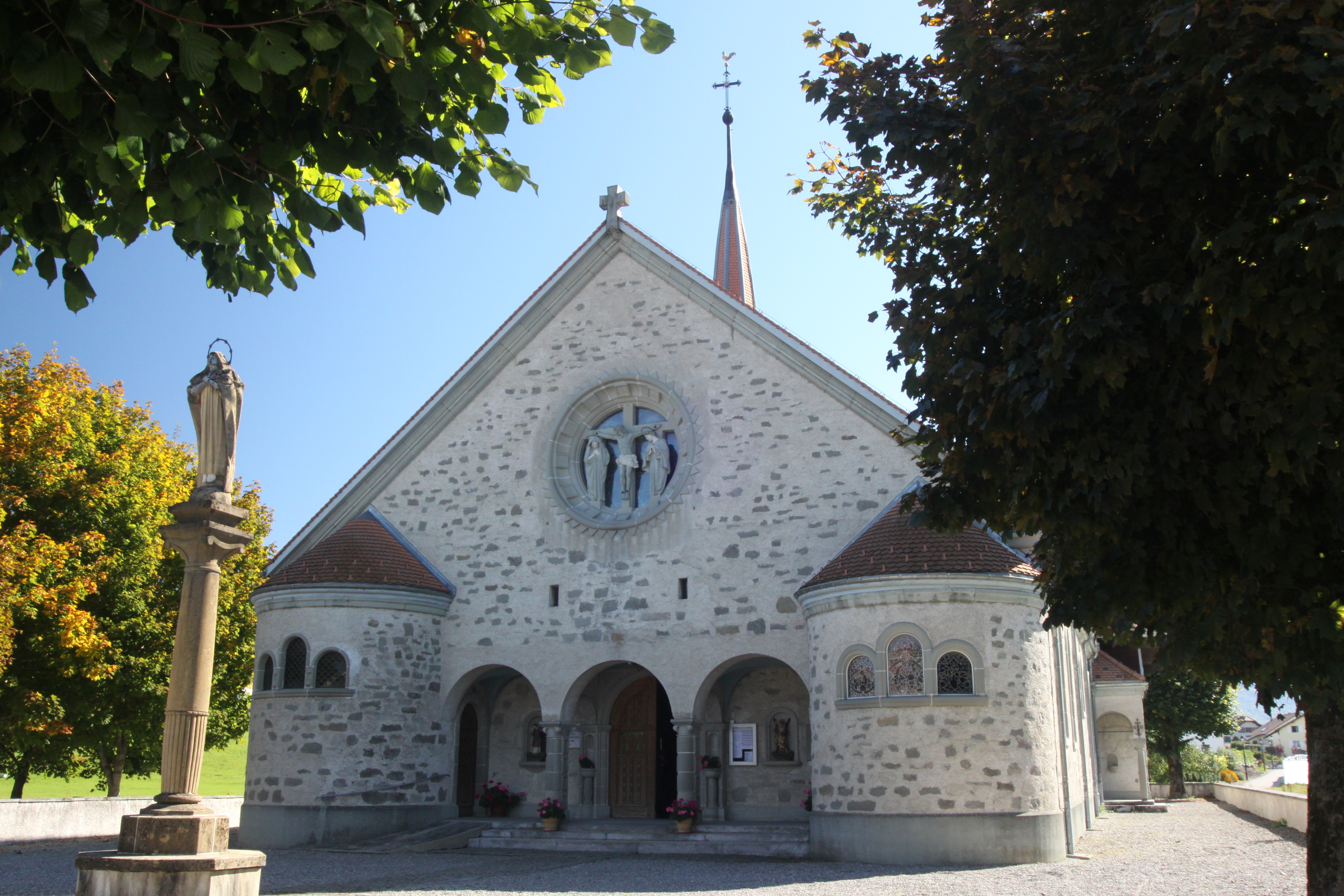
Notre-Dame De L’Assomption Church

The Notre-Dame De L’Assomption Church is listed as a Swiss heritage site of national significance.

== Politics ==
In the 2011 federal election the most popular party was the SP which received 31.3% of the vote. The next three most popular parties were the SVP (19.1%), the FDP (17.5%) and the CVP (14.6%).

The SPS gained an additional 6.4% of the vote from the 2007 Federal election (24.9% in 2007 vs 31.3% in 2011). The SVP moved from third in 2007 (with 19.6%) to second in 2011, the FDP moved from second in 2007 (with 24.0%) to third and the CVP retained about the same popularity (18.4% in 2007). A total of 236 votes were cast in this election, of which 4 or 1.7% were invalid.

== Economy ==
As of 2010, Echarlens had an unemployment rate of 2.7%. As of 2008, there were 42 people employed in the primary economic sector and about 19 businesses involved in this sector. 13 people were employed in the secondary sector and there were 7 businesses in this sector. 38 people were employed in the tertiary sector, with 11 businesses in this sector. There were 299 residents of the municipality who were employed in some capacity, of which females made up 40.5% of the workforce.

In 2008 the total number of full-time equivalent jobs was 71. The number of jobs in the primary sector was 34, all of which were in agriculture. The number of jobs in the secondary sector was 13 of which 5 or (38.5%) were in manufacturing and 8 (61.5%) were in construction. The number of jobs in the tertiary sector was 24. In the tertiary sector; 7 or 29.2% were in wholesale or retail sales or the repair of motor vehicles, 2 or 8.3% were in the movement and storage of goods, 5 or 20.8% were in a hotel or restaurant, 3 or 12.5% were technical professionals or scientists, 4 or 16.7% were in education.

In 2000, there were 28 workers who commuted into the municipality and 233 workers who commuted away. The municipality is a net exporter of workers, with about 8.3 workers leaving the municipality for every one entering. Of the working population, 8.4% used public transportation to get to work, and 71.9% used a private car.

== Religion ==
From the 2000 census, 440 or 79.7% were Roman Catholic, while 29 or 5.3% belonged to the Swiss Reformed Church. Of the rest of the population, there was 1 member of an Orthodox church. There were 7 (or about 1.27% of the population) who were Islamic. There was 1 person who was Hindu. 52 (or about 9.42% of the population) belonged to no church, are agnostic or atheist, and 22 individuals (or about 3.99% of the population) did not answer the question.

== Education ==
In Echarlens about 166 or (30.1%) of the population have completed non-mandatory upper secondary education, and 70 or (12.7%) have completed additional higher education (either university or a Fachhochschule). Of the 70 who completed tertiary schooling, 61.4% were Swiss men, 27.1% were Swiss women.

The Canton of Fribourg school system provides one year of non-obligatory Kindergarten, followed by six years of Primary school. This is followed by three years of obligatory lower Secondary school where the students are separated according to ability and aptitude. Following the lower Secondary students may attend a three or four year optional upper Secondary school. The upper Secondary school is divided into gymnasium (university preparatory) and vocational programs. After they finish the upper Secondary program, students may choose to attend a Tertiary school or continue their apprenticeship.

During the 2010–11 school year, there were a total of 101 students attending 5 classes in Echarlens. A total of 143 students from the municipality attended any school, either in the municipality or outside of it. There was one kindergarten class with a total of 21 students in the municipality. The municipality had 4 primary classes and 80 students. During the same year, there were no lower secondary classes in the municipality, but 28 students attended lower secondary school in a neighboring municipality. There were no upper Secondary classes or vocational classes, but there were 15 upper Secondary students and 16 upper Secondary vocational students who attended classes in another municipality. The municipality had no non-university Tertiary classes, but there was one non-university Tertiary student and 3 specialized Tertiary students who attended classes in another municipality.

As of 2000, there were 42 students in Echarlens who came from another municipality, while 60 residents attended schools outside the municipality.
