= Hauteville, Switzerland =

Hauteville
- Municipality
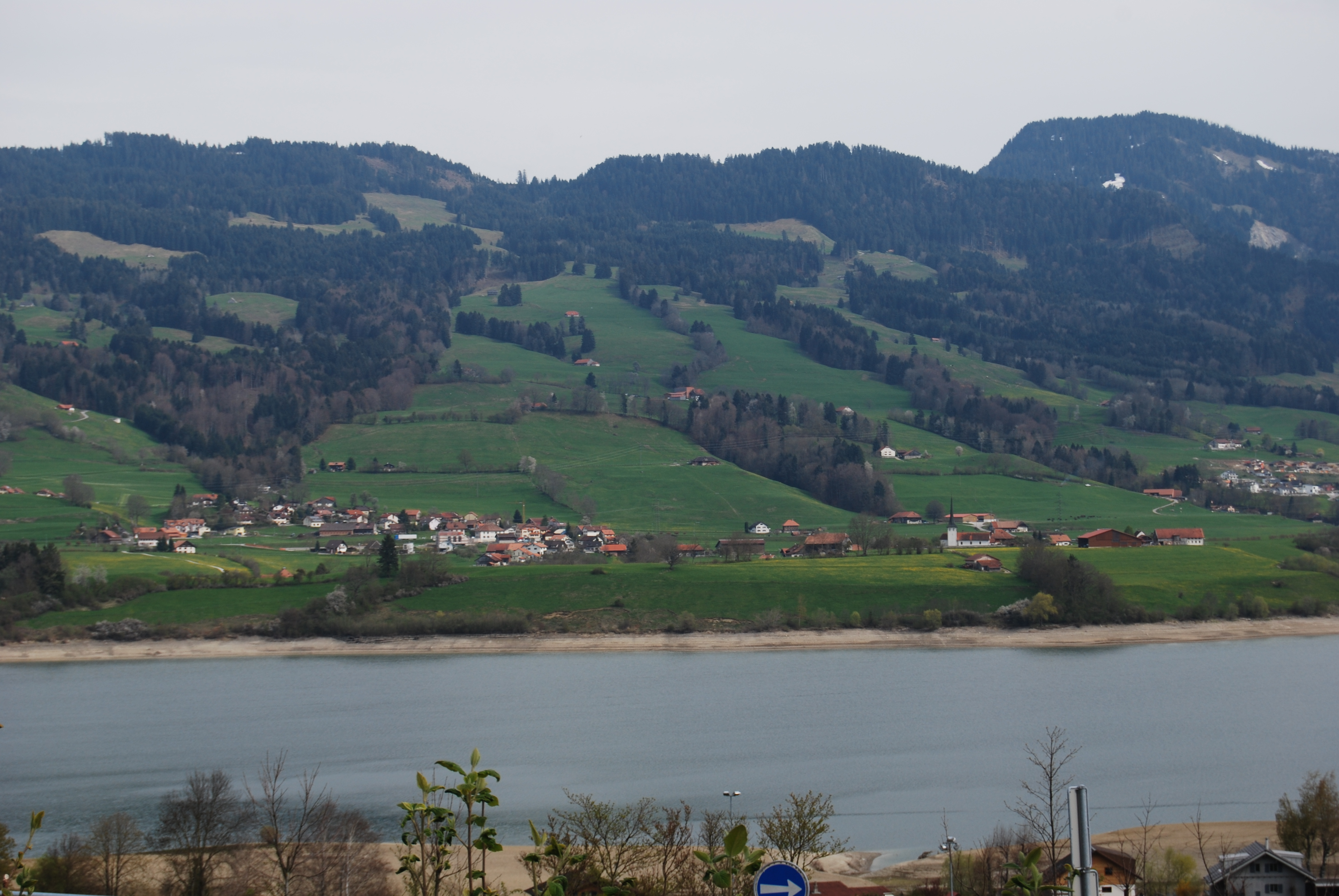

- Coat of arms
- Location of Hauteville
- Location within Switzerland Location within Canton of Fribourg
- Coordinates: 46°40′N 7°7′E
- Country: Switzerland
- Canton: Fribourg
- District: Gruyère

Government
  - Mayor: Syndic

Area
  - Total: 10.56 km^{2} (4.08 sq mi)
- Elevation: 717 m (2,352 ft)

Population (December 2020)
  - Total: 678
  - Density: 64.2/km^{2} (166/sq mi)
- Time zone: UTC+01:00 (CET)
  - Summer (DST): UTC+02:00 (CEST)
- Postal code: 1648
- SFOS number: 2137
- ISO 3166 code: CH-FR
- Surrounded by: Corbières, La Roche, Marsens, Pont-en-Ogoz, Pont-la-Ville, Val-de-Charmey
- Website: https://www.hauteville.ch SFSO statistics

Hauteville (French: [otvil]; Arpitan: Hôtavela, locally Otavela [otaˈvəla]) is a municipality within the district of Gruyère in the canton of Fribourg in Switzerland.

== History ==
Hauteville is first mentioned in 1148 as apud Altam villam. In 1227 it was mentioned as Jocelnus de Altaville.

== Geography ==
Hauteville has an area, as of 2009, of 10.5 square kilometers (4.1 mi^{2}). Of this area, 5.37 km^{2} (2.07 mi^{2}) or 51.0% is used for agricultural purposes, while 4.6 km^{2} (1.8 mi^{2}) or 43.7% is forested. Of the rest of the land, 0.5 km^{2} (0.19 mi^{2}) or 4.8% is settled (buildings or roads), 0.05 km^{2} (12 acres) or 0.5% is either rivers or lakes and 0.03 km^{2} (7.4 acres) or 0.3% is unproductive land.

Of the built up area, housing and buildings made up 2.4% and transportation infrastructure made up 1.9%. Out of the forested land, 39.6% of the total land area is heavily forested and 4.1% is covered with orchards or small clusters of trees. Of the agricultural land, 27.8% is pastures and 23.2% is used for alpine pastures. Of the water in the municipality, 0.3% is in lakes and 0.2% is in rivers and streams.

The municipality is located in the Gruyère district, on the eastern shore of Lake of Gruyère. It consists of the village of Hauteville and the hamlets of Impart, Le Ru and Longemort.

== Coat of arms ==
The blazon of the municipal coat of arms is Gules a bend Argent overall a Palm Branch Vert in pale.

== Demographics ==
Hauteville has a population (as of December 2020) of 678. As of 2008, 9.0% of the population are resident foreign nationals. Over the last 10 years (2000–2010) the population has changed at a rate of 23.7%. Migration accounted for 15.4%, while births and deaths accounted for 10.3%.

Most of the population (as of 2000) speaks French (427 or 92.0%) as their first language, German is the second most common (24 or 5.2%) and Portuguese is the third (7 or 1.5%). There is 1 person who speaks Italian.

As of 2008, the population was 49.5% male and 50.5% female. The population was made up of 245 Swiss men (44.8% of the population) and 26 (4.8%) non-Swiss men. There were 254 Swiss women (46.4%) and 22 (4.0%) non-Swiss women. Of the population in the municipality, 167 or about 36.0% were born in Hauteville and lived there in 2000. There were 186 or 40.1% who were born in the same canton, while 60 or 12.9% were born somewhere else in Switzerland, and 37 or 8.0% were born outside of Switzerland.

As of 2000, children and teenagers (0–19 years old) make up 27.8% of the population, while adults (20–64 years old) make up 58.4% and seniors (over 64 years old) make up 13.8%.

As of 2000, there were 220 people who were single and never married in the municipality. There were 198 married individuals, 26 widows or widowers and 20 individuals who are divorced.

As of 2000, there were 180 private households in the municipality, and an average of 2.5 persons per household. There were 51 households that consist of only one person and 14 households with five or more people. In 2000, a total of 172 apartments (73.5% of the total) were permanently occupied, while 54 apartments (23.1%) were seasonally occupied and 8 apartments (3.4%) were empty. As of 2009, the construction rate of new housing units was 7.2 new units per 1000 residents. The vacancy rate for the municipality, in 2010, was 0.37%.

The historical population is given in the following chart:

== Heritage sites of national significance ==
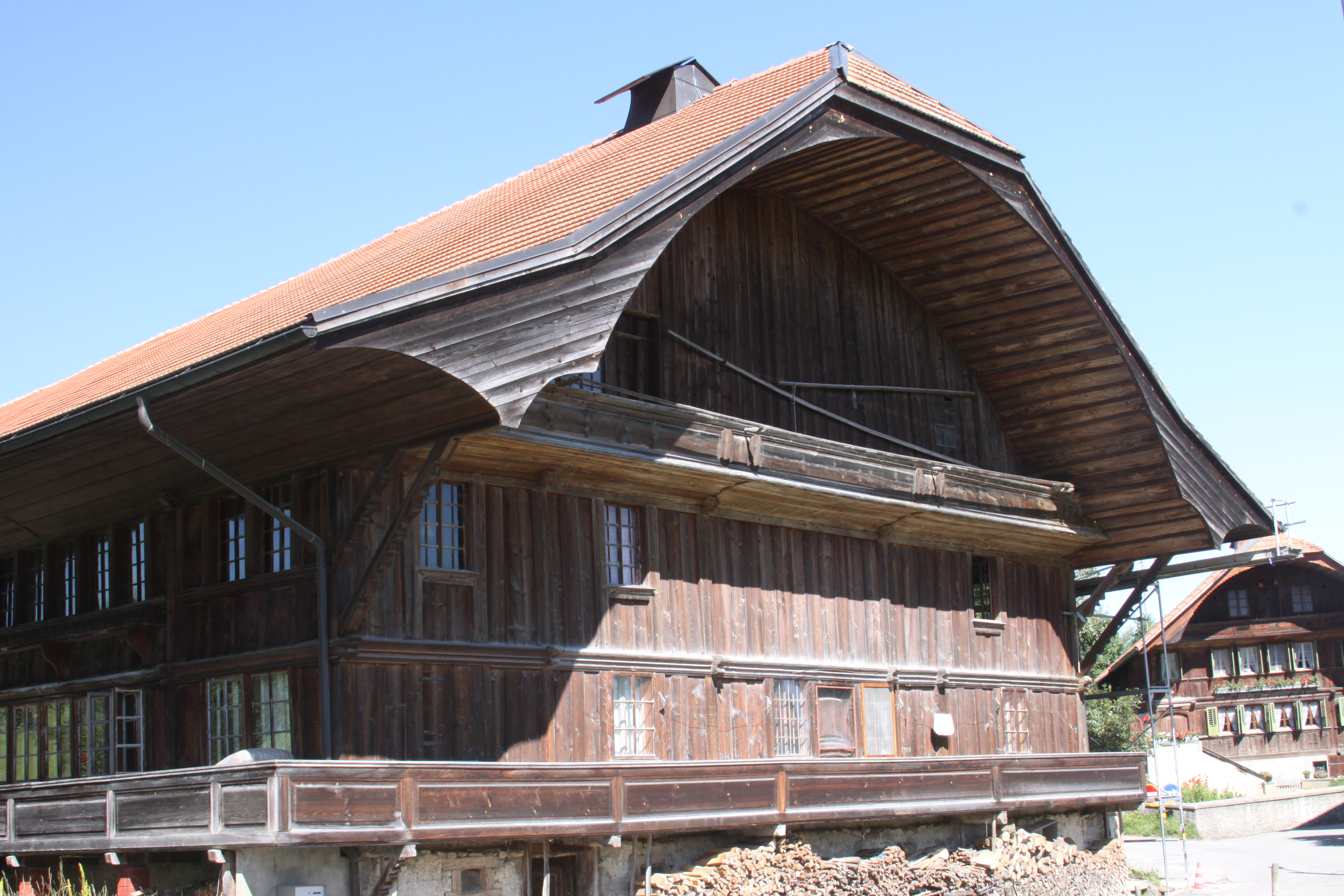
Farm house

The Farm House at Route de l'Église 47 is listed as a Swiss heritage site of national significance.

== Politics ==
In the 2011 federal election the most popular party was the SVP which received 29.7% of the vote. The next three most popular parties were the SP (23.3%), the CVP (19.6%) and the FDP (12.9%).

The SVP received about the same percentage of the vote as they did in the 2007 Federal election (31.4% in 2007 vs 29.7% in 2011). The SPS moved from third in 2007 (with 17.8%) to second in 2011, the CVP moved from second in 2007 (with 24.8%) to third and the FDP retained about the same popularity (13.1% in 2007). A total of 168 votes were cast in this election, of which 2 or 1.2% were invalid.

== Economy ==
As of 2010, Hauteville had an unemployment rate of 2%. As of 2008, there were 26 people employed in the primary economic sector and about 12 businesses involved in this sector. 8 people were employed in the secondary sector and there were 4 businesses in this sector. 34 people were employed in the tertiary sector, with 9 businesses in this sector. There were 225 residents of the municipality who were employed in some capacity, of which females made up 41.8% of the workforce.

In 2008 the total number of full-time equivalent jobs was 50. The number of jobs in the primary sector was 17, all of which were in agriculture. The number of jobs in the secondary sector was 8 of which 7 or (87.5%) were in manufacturing and 1 was in construction. The number of jobs in the tertiary sector was 25. In the tertiary sector; 2 or 8.0% were in the movement and storage of goods, 8 or 32.0% were in a hotel or restaurant, 10 or 40.0% were in the information industry, 1 was the insurance or financial industry, 2 or 8.0% were in education.

In 2000, there were 10 workers who commuted into the municipality and 169 workers who commuted away. The municipality is a net exporter of workers, with about 16.9 workers leaving the municipality for every one entering. Of the working population, 7.6% used public transportation to get to work, and 75.1% used a private car.

== Religion ==
From the 2000 census, 368 or 79.3% were Roman Catholic, while 41 or 8.8% belonged to the Swiss Reformed Church. Of the rest of the population, there were 5 individuals (or about 1.08% of the population) who belonged to another Christian church. There were 2 individuals who were Buddhist. 29 (or about 6.25% of the population) belonged to no church, are agnostic or atheist, and 21 individuals (or about 4.53% of the population) did not answer the question.

== Education ==
In Hauteville about 128 or (27.6%) of the population have completed non-mandatory upper secondary education, and 52 or (11.2%) have completed additional higher education (either university or a Fachhochschule). Of the 52 who completed tertiary schooling, 46.2% were Swiss men, 30.8% were Swiss women, 15.4% were non-Swiss men.

The Canton of Fribourg school system provides one year of non-obligatory Kindergarten, followed by six years of Primary school. This is followed by three years of obligatory lower Secondary school where the students are separated according to ability and aptitude. Following the lower Secondary students may attend a three or four year optional upper Secondary school. The upper Secondary school is divided into gymnasium (university preparatory) and vocational programs. After they finish the upper Secondary program, students may choose to attend a Tertiary school or continue their apprenticeship.

During the 2010-11 school year, there were a total of 33 students attending 2 classes in Hauteville. A total of 95 students from the municipality attended any school, either in the municipality or outside of it. There was one kindergarten class with a total of 17 students in the municipality. The municipality had one primary class and 16 students. During the same year, there were no lower secondary classes in the municipality, but 19 students attended lower secondary school in a neighboring municipality. There were no upper Secondary classes or vocational classes, but there were 3 upper Secondary students and 14 upper Secondary vocational students who attended classes in another municipality. The municipality had no non-university Tertiary classes, but there was one specialized Tertiary student who attended classes in another municipality.

As of 2000, there were 18 students in Hauteville who came from another municipality, while 56 residents attended schools outside the municipality.
