= Baillival Castle (Vuippens) =

Castle in Marsens, Switzerland

- Marsens
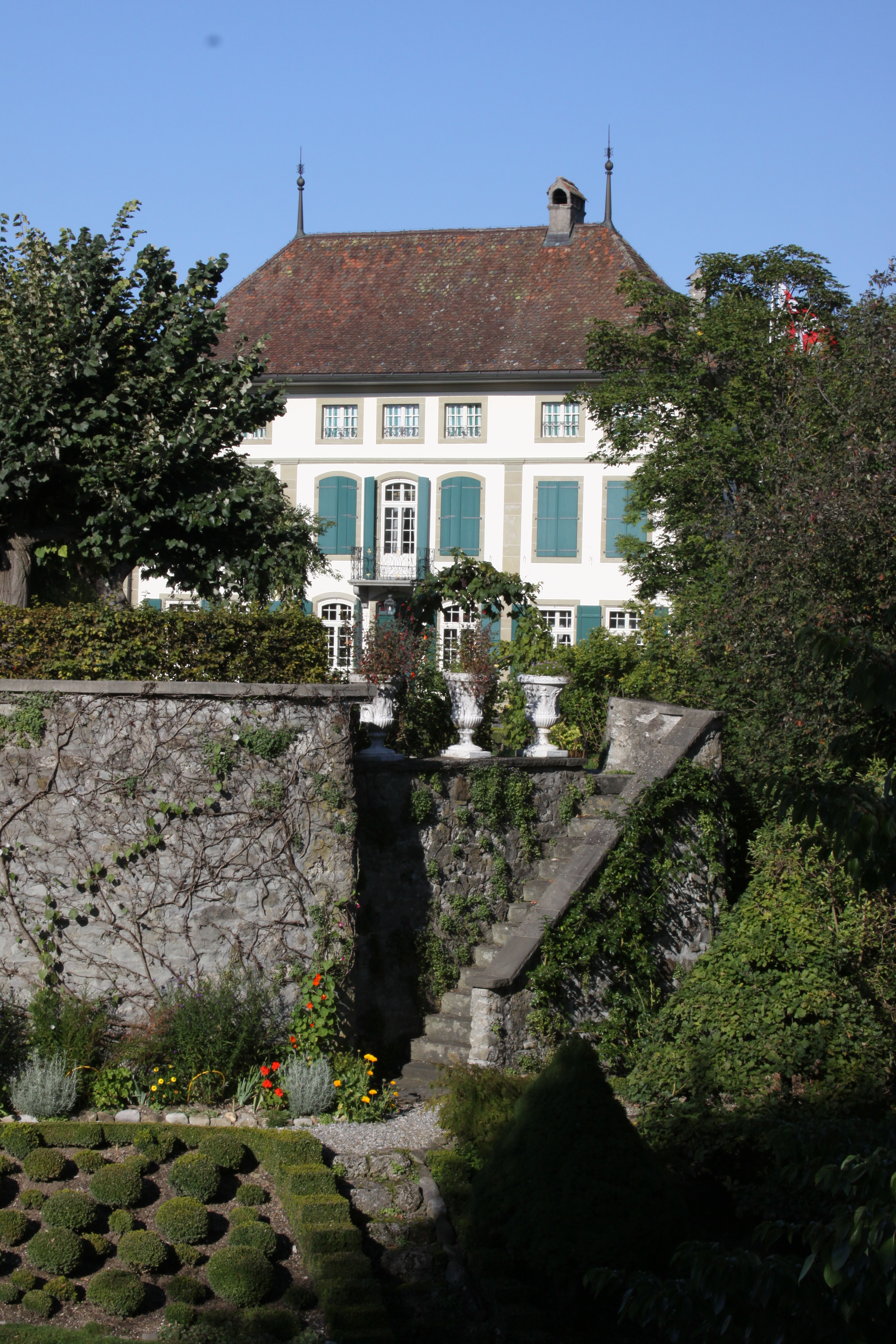
- Baillival Castle

Site information
- Code: CH-FR

Location
- Location within Canton of Fribourg Location within Switzerland
- Coordinates: 46°39′30″N 7°04′41″E

Baillival Castle (Vuippens) is a bailiff's castle in the village of Vuippens in the municipality of Marsens of the Canton of Fribourg in Switzerland. It is a Swiss heritage site of national significance.

== See also ==
- List of castles in Switzerland
- Château
