= Villarvolard =

- Former municipality
- Coat of arms
- Location of Villarvolard
- Location within Switzerland Location within Canton of Fribourg
- Coordinates: 46°39′N 7°6′E
- Country: Switzerland
- Canton: Fribourg
- District: Gruyère

Government
  - Mayor: Syndic

Area
  - Total: 5.46 km^{2} (2.11 sq mi)
- Elevation: 732 m (2,402 ft)

Population (31 December 2010)
  - Total: 268
  - Density: 49.1/km^{2} (127/sq mi)
- Time zone: UTC+01:00 (CET)
  - Summer (DST): UTC+02:00 (CEST)
- Postal code: 1651
- SFOS number: 2159
- ISO 3166 code: CH-FR
- Surrounded by: Cerniat, Corbières, Echarlens, Morlon, Villarbeney
- Website: SFSO statistics

Villarvolard (Arpitan: Velâr-Volârd) is a former municipality in the district of Gruyère in the canton of Fribourg in Switzerland. On 1 January 2011 it was merged with the municipality of Corbières.
