= Marsens =

- Municipality
- Coat of arms
- Location of Marsens
- Location within Switzerland Location within Canton of Fribourg
- Coordinates: 46°39′N 7°4′E
- Country: Switzerland
- Canton: Fribourg
- District: Gruyère

Government
  - Mayor: Syndic

Area
  - Total: 7.79 km^{2} (3.01 sq mi)
- Elevation: 722 m (2,369 ft)

Population (December 2020)
  - Total: 2,034
  - Density: 261/km^{2} (676/sq mi)
- Time zone: UTC+01:00 (CET)
  - Summer (DST): UTC+02:00 (CEST)
- Postal code: 1633
- SFOS number: 2140
- ISO 3166 code: CH-FR
- Localities: Marsens, Vuippens
- Surrounded by: Corbières, Echarlens, Grangettes, Hauteville, Le Châtelard, Pont-en-Ogoz, Riaz, Sâles, Sorens
- Website: www.marsens.ch

Marsens (French pronunciation: [maʁsɑ̃s]; Arpitan: Machin) is a municipality in the district of Gruyère in the canton of Fribourg in Switzerland. On 1 January 2001 the former municipality of Vuippens merged into the municipality of Marsens.

== History ==
Aerial view (1952)

Marsens derives its name from the god Mars. Archaeology in the village uncovered a Gallo-Roman temple dedicated to the god, which was destroyed in 260. The site of the temple can be seen today. Marsens is first mentioned in 851 as Curtis marsingus. In 929 it was mentioned as Marsingis and in 1668 it was Marcens. The municipality was formerly known by its German name Marsing, however, that name is no longer used.

Marsens was also well known for the Humilmont convent, the remains of which sit just outside the village.

In more recent times, it is best known as the site of the psychiatric hospital of the canton.

While this region's economy has long been based in agriculture, Marsens today is developing more artisans and industry. The village is expanding as new modern homes are built, but Marsens' pastoral view of the mountains and the sound of nearby cows' bells remains.

== Geography ==
Marsens has an area, as of 2009, of 7.8 square kilometers (3.0 mi^{2}). Of this area, 4.96 km^{2} (1.92 mi^{2}) or 63.5% is used for agricultural purposes, while 1.94 km^{2} (0.75 mi^{2}) or 24.8% is forested. Of the rest of the land, 0.86 km^{2} (0.33 mi^{2}) or 11.0% is settled (buildings or roads), 0.02 km^{2} (4.9 acres) or 0.3% is either rivers or lakes and 0.02 km^{2} (4.9 acres) or 0.3% is unproductive land.

Of the built up area, housing and buildings made up 6.8% and transportation infrastructure made up 2.3%. Power and water infrastructure as well as other special developed areas made up 1.2% of the area Out of the forested land, 23.3% of the total land area is heavily forested and 1.5% is covered with orchards or small clusters of trees. Of the agricultural land, 8.7% is used for growing crops and 52.4% is pastures and 1.7% is used for alpine pastures. All the water in the municipality is flowing water.

The municipality is located in the Gruyère district. The municipality comprises the small villages of Marsens and its neighbor Vuippens. They are 5 km (16,000 ft) from the town of Bulle, and 20 km (12 mi) from the city of Fribourg.

== Coat of arms ==
The blazon of the municipal coat of arms is Pally of Six Argent and Gules

== Demographics ==
Marsens has a population (as of December 2020) of 2,034. As of 2008, 9.4% of the population are resident foreign nationals. Over the last 10 years (2000–2010) the population has changed at a rate of 24.7%. Migration accounted for 14.9%, while births and deaths accounted for 7.5%.

Most of the population (as of 2000) speaks French (1,041 or 92.7%) as their first language, German is the second most common (45 or 4.0%) and Italian is the third (11 or 1.0%).

As of 2008, the population was 50.3% male and 49.7% female. The population was made up of 734 Swiss men (45.0% of the population) and 86 (5.3%) non-Swiss men. There were 736 Swiss women (45.2%) and 74 (4.5%) non-Swiss women. Of the population in the municipality, 252 or about 22.4% were born in Marsens and lived there in 2000. There were 548 or 48.8% who were born in the same canton, while 148 or 13.2% were born somewhere else in Switzerland, and 127 or 11.3% were born outside of Switzerland.

As of 2000, children and teenagers (0–19 years old) make up 28.9% of the population, while adults (20–64 years old) make up 55.2% and seniors (over 64 years old) make up 15.9%.

As of 2000, there were 524 people who were single and never married in the municipality. There were 497 married individuals, 53 widows or widowers and 49 individuals who are divorced.

As of 2000, there were 437 private households in the municipality, and an average of 2.8 persons per household. There were 76 households that consist of only one person and 53 households with five or more people. In 2000, a total of 333 apartments (82.6% of the total) were permanently occupied, while 64 apartments (15.9%) were seasonally occupied and 6 apartments (1.5%) were empty. As of 2009, the construction rate of new housing units was 5.2 new units per 1000 residents.

The historical population is given in the following chart:

== Heritage sites of national significance ==
Baillival (Bailiff's) Castle, the Saint-Ignace Chapel and the Philiponna, farm house in Vuippens at Place Saint-Sulpice 6 are listed as Swiss heritage site of national significance. The entire Vuippens area is part of the Inventory of Swiss Heritage Sites.

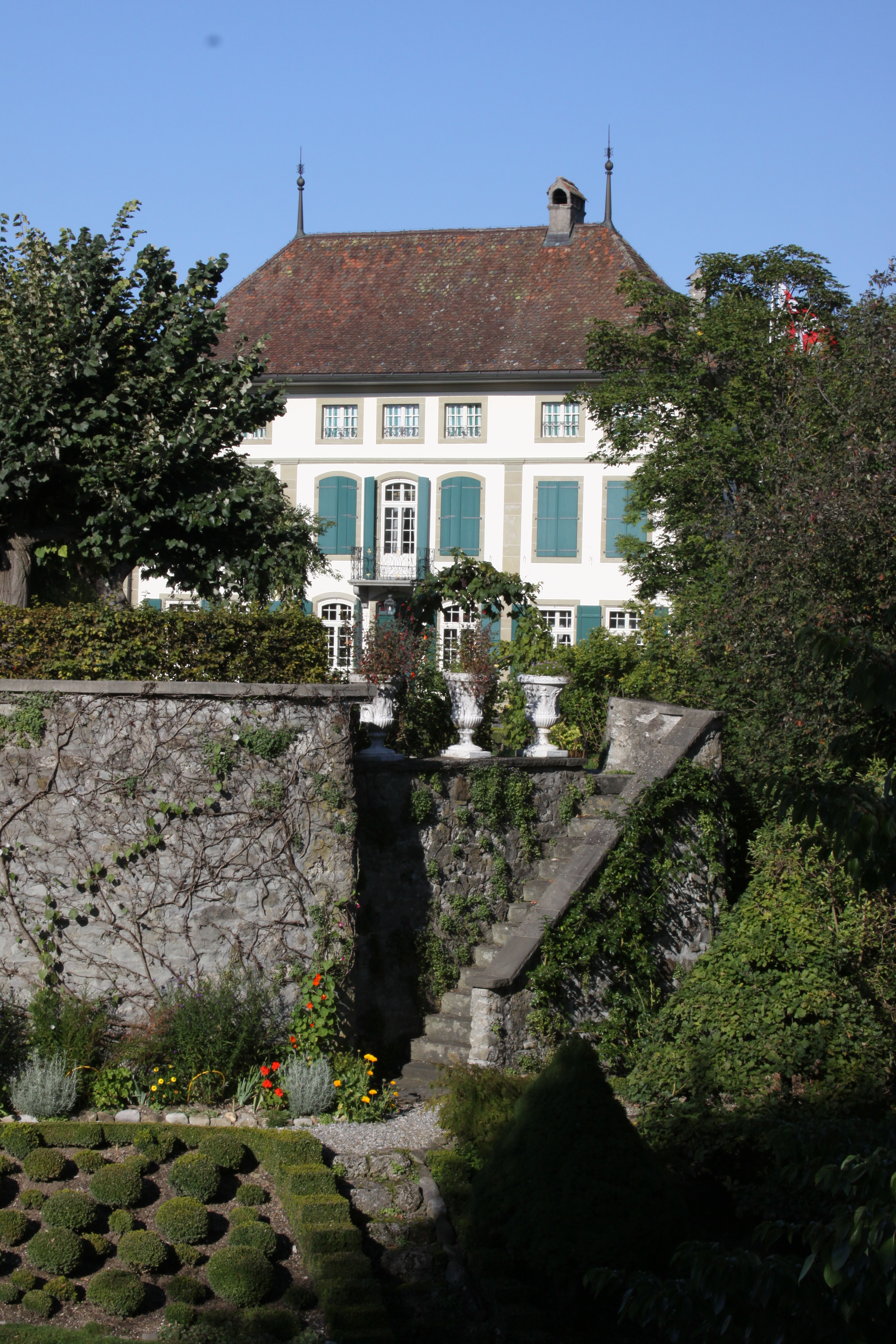
Baillival Castle

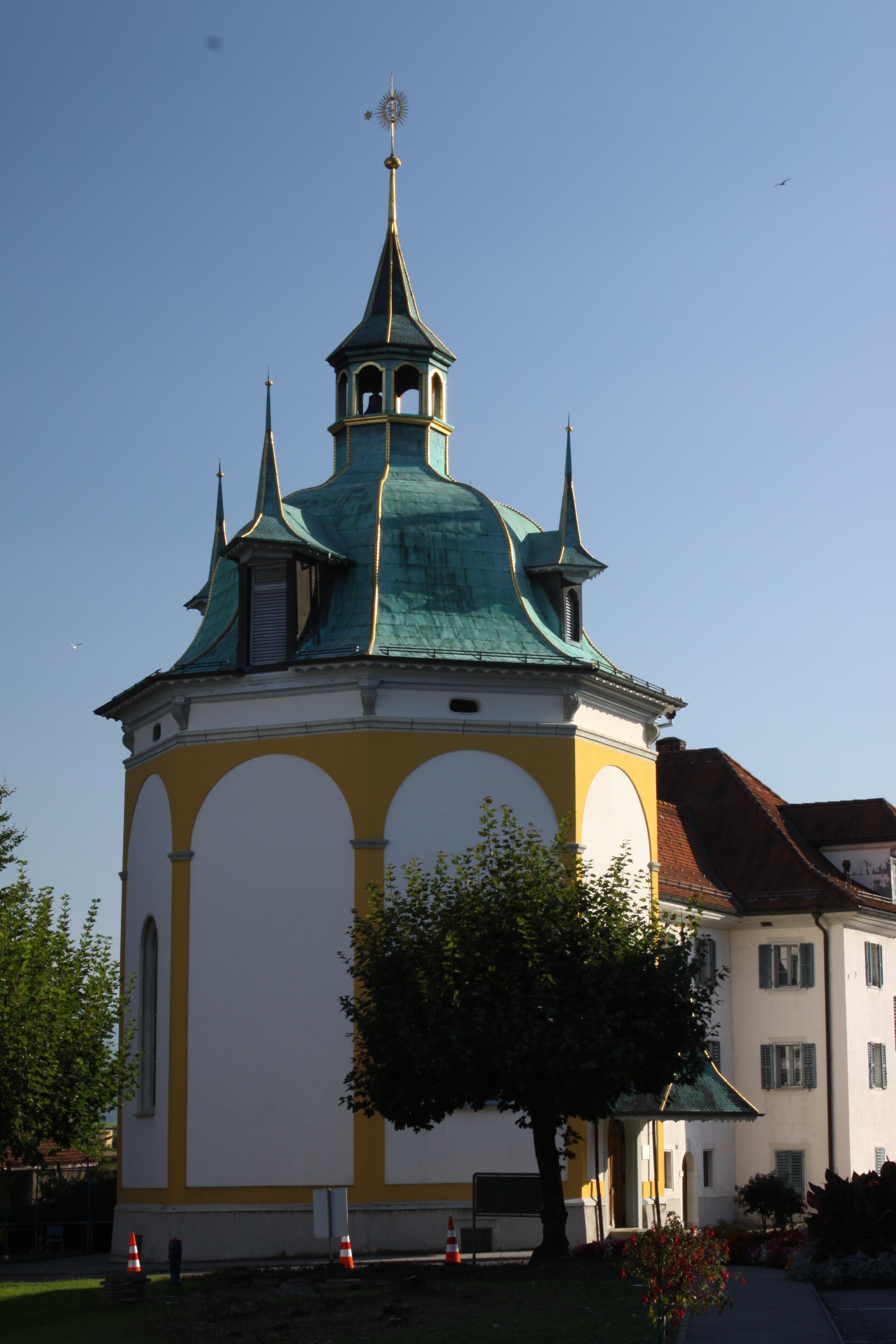
Saint-Ignace Chapel

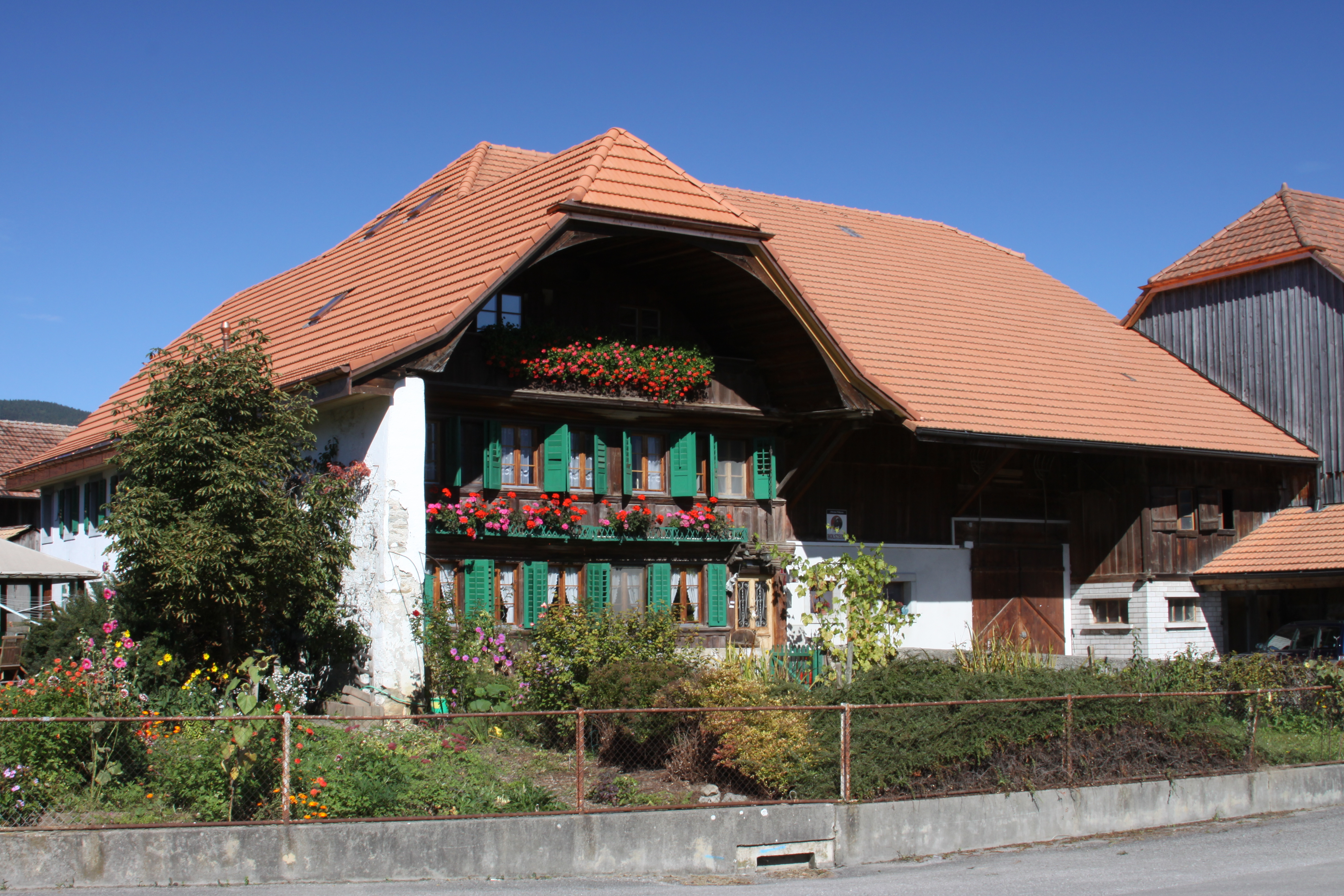
Philiponna, Farm House in Vuippens at Place Saint-Sulpice 6

== Politics ==
In the 2011 federal election the most popular party was the SP which received 27.3% of the vote. The next three most popular parties were the SVP (21.3%), the CVP (18.6%) and the FDP (14.2%).

The SPS received about the same percentage of the vote as they did in the 2007 Federal election (27.0% in 2007 vs 27.3% in 2011). The SVP moved from third in 2007 (with 18.4%) to second in 2011, the CVP moved from second in 2007 (with 25.2%) to third and the FDP retained about the same popularity (15.8% in 2007). A total of 523 votes were cast in this election, of which 10 or 1.9% were invalid.

== Economy ==
As of 2010, Marsens had an unemployment rate of 1.8%. As of 2008, there were 37 people employed in the primary economic sector and about 17 businesses involved in this sector. 29 people were employed in the secondary sector and there were 9 businesses in this sector. 599 people were employed in the tertiary sector, with 34 businesses in this sector. There were 488 residents of the municipality who were employed in some capacity, of which females made up 45.9% of the workforce.

In 2008 the total number of full-time equivalent jobs was 543. The number of jobs in the primary sector was 32, of which 28 were in agriculture and 4 were in forestry or lumber production. The number of jobs in the secondary sector was 26 of which 16 or (61.5%) were in manufacturing and 11 (42.3%) were in construction. The number of jobs in the tertiary sector was 485. In the tertiary sector; 29 or 6.0% were in wholesale or retail sales or the repair of motor vehicles, 4 or 0.8% were in the movement and storage of goods, 16 or 3.3% were in a hotel or restaurant, 1 was in the information industry, 2 or 0.4% were the insurance or financial industry, 6 or 1.2% were technical professionals or scientists, 14 or 2.9% were in education and 400 or 82.5% were in health care.

In 2000, there were 477 workers who commuted into the municipality and 291 workers who commuted away. The municipality is a net importer of workers, with about 1.6 workers entering the municipality for every one leaving. Of the working population, 6.6% used public transportation to get to work, and 68.7% used a private car.

== Religion ==
From the 2000 census, 902 or 80.3% were Roman Catholic, while 61 or 5.4% belonged to the Swiss Reformed Church. Of the rest of the population, there was 1 member of an Orthodox church, and there were 11 individuals (or about 0.98% of the population) who belonged to another Christian church. There were 6 (or about 0.53% of the population) who were Islamic. There was 1 person who was Hindu and 1 individual who belonged to another church. 104 (or about 9.26% of the population) belonged to no church, are agnostic or atheist, and 41 individuals (or about 3.65% of the population) did not answer the question.

== Weather ==
Marsens has an average of 132.5 days of rain or snow per year and on average receives 1,212 mm (47.7 in) of precipitation. The wettest month is June during which time Marsens receives an average of 134 mm (5.3 in) of rain or snow. During this month there is precipitation for an average of 12.8 days. The month with the most days of precipitation is May, with an average of 14.1, but with only 121 mm (4.8 in) of rain or snow. The driest month of the year is February with an average of 78 mm (3.1 in) of precipitation over 10.2 days.

== Education ==
In Marsens about 338 or (30.1%) of the population have completed non-mandatory upper secondary education, and 118 or (10.5%) have completed additional higher education (either university or a Fachhochschule). Of the 118 who completed tertiary schooling, 50.8% were Swiss men, 28.8% were Swiss women, 15.3% were non-Swiss men and 5.1% were non-Swiss women.

The Canton of Fribourg school system provides one year of non-obligatory Kindergarten, followed by six years of Primary school. This is followed by three years of obligatory lower Secondary school where the students are separated according to ability and aptitude. Following the lower Secondary students may attend a three or four year optional upper Secondary school. The upper Secondary school is divided into gymnasium (university preparatory) and vocational programs. After they finish the upper Secondary program, students may choose to attend a Tertiary school or continue their apprenticeship.

During the 2010-11 school year, there were a total of 184 students attending 9 classes in Marsens. A total of 369 students from the municipality attended any school, either in the municipality or outside of it. There was one kindergarten class with a total of 20 students in the municipality. The municipality had 8 primary classes and 164 students. During the same year, there were no lower secondary classes in the municipality, but 58 students attended lower secondary school in a neighboring municipality. There were no upper Secondary classes or vocational classes, but there were 39 upper Secondary students and 55 upper Secondary vocational students who attended classes in another municipality. The municipality had no non-university Tertiary classes, but there were 5 non-university Tertiary students and 5 specialized Tertiary students who attended classes in another municipality.

As of 2000, there were 54 students in Marsens who came from another municipality, while 128 residents attended schools outside the municipality.
