= Sorens =

Municipality in Fribrourg, Switzerland

- Municipality
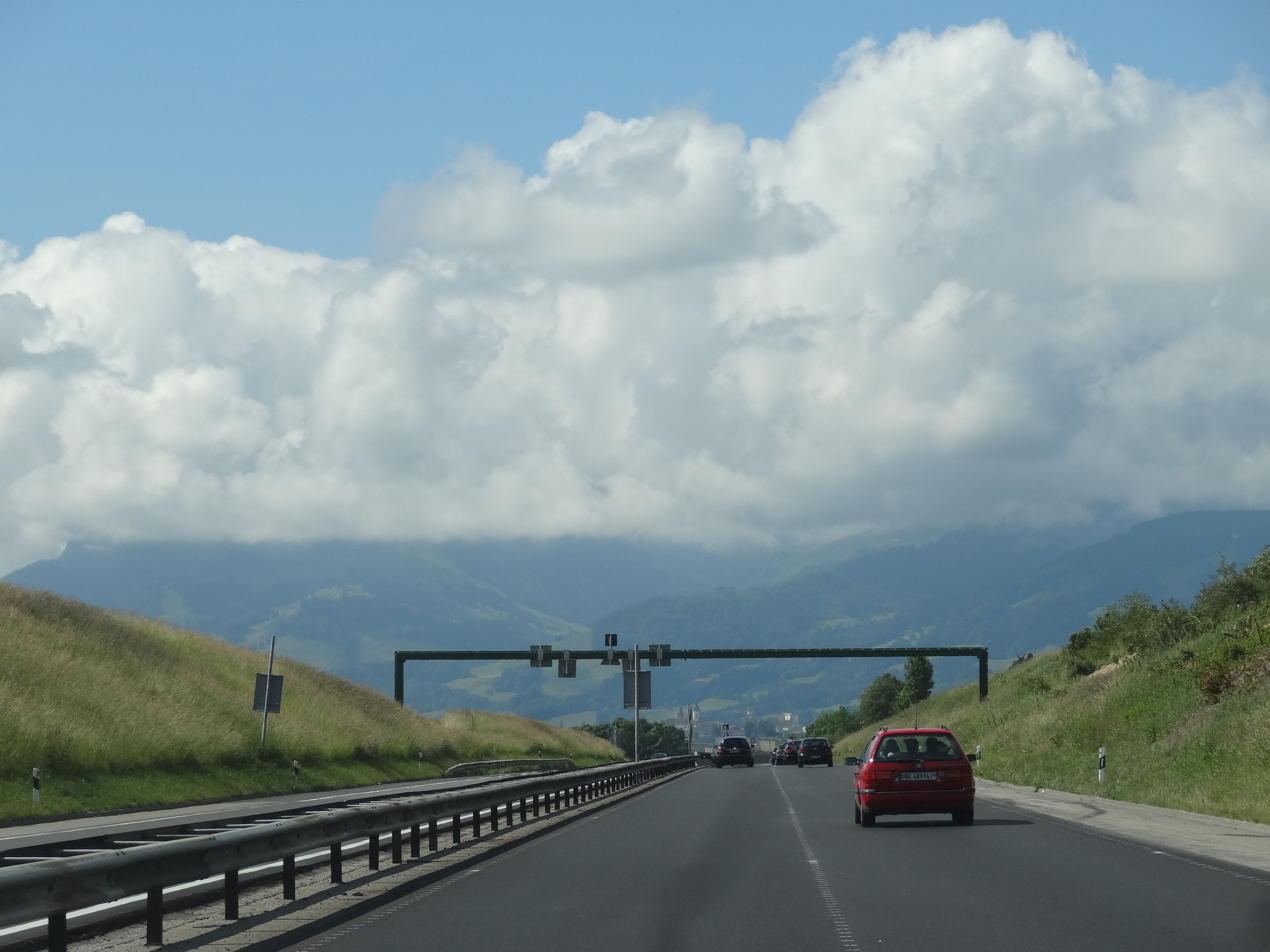
- Sorens in 2013

- Coat of arms
- Location of Sorens
- Location within Switzerland Location within Canton of Fribourg
- Coordinates: 46°40′N 7°4′E
- Country: Switzerland
- Canton: Fribourg
- District: Gruyère

Government
  - Mayor: Syndic

Area
  - Total: 8.74 km^{2} (3.37 sq mi)
- Elevation: 800 m (2,600 ft)

Population (December 2020)
  - Total: 1,105
  - Density: 126/km^{2} (327/sq mi)
- Time zone: UTC+01:00 (CET)
  - Summer (DST): UTC+02:00 (CEST)
- Postal code: 1642
- SFOS number: 2153
- ISO 3166 code: CH-FR
- Surrounded by: Le Châtelard, Le Glèbe, Marsens, Pont-en-Ogoz, Villorsonnens
- Website: https://www.sorens.ch SFSO statistics

Sorens (French: [sɔʁɑ̃s], Franco-Provençal: [ʃɔˈʁɛ̃]) is a municipality in the district of Gruyère in the canton of Fribourg in Switzerland.

== History ==
Sorens is first mentioned around 974-75 as Sotringus. The municipality was formerly known by its German name Soring, however, that name is no longer used.

== Geography ==
Sorens has an area, as of 2009, of 8.7 square kilometers (3.4 mi^{2}). Of this area, 5.64 km^{2} (2.18 mi^{2}) or 64.7% is used for agricultural purposes, while 2.32 km^{2} (0.90 mi^{2}) or 26.6% is forested. Of the rest of the land, 0.78 km^{2} (0.30 mi^{2}) or 8.9% is settled (buildings or roads).

Of the built up area, housing and buildings made up 4.6% and transportation infrastructure made up 2.8%. Out of the forested land, 24.4% of the total land area is heavily forested and 2.2% is covered with orchards or small clusters of trees. Of the agricultural land, 8.1% is used for growing crops and 49.0% is pastures and 7.1% is used for alpine pastures.

The municipality is located in the Gruyère district, near the Bulle-Fribourg road on the eastern slope of the Gibloux.

== Coat of arms ==
The blazon of the municipal coat of arms is Pally of Six Argent and Gules overall a Roebuck salient proper.

== Demographics ==
Sorens has a population (as of December 2020) of 1,105. As of 2008, 6.6% of the population are resident foreign nationals. Over the last 10 years (2000–2010) the population has changed at a rate of 19.5%. Migration accounted for 18.7%, while births and deaths accounted for 1.1%.

Most of the population (as of 2000) speaks French (800 or 95.7%) as their first language, German is the second most common (24 or 2.9%) and Portuguese is the third (3 or 0.4%). There are 2 people who speak Italian and 1 person who speaks Romansh.

As of 2008, the population was 52.5% male and 47.5% female. The population was made up of 470 Swiss men (49.0% of the population) and 34 (3.5%) non-Swiss men. There were 429 Swiss women (44.7%) and 27 (2.8%) non-Swiss women. Of the population in the municipality, 317 or about 37.9% were born in Sorens and lived there in 2000. There were 297 or 35.5% who were born in the same canton, while 86 or 10.3% were born somewhere else in Switzerland, and 68 or 8.1% were born outside of Switzerland.

As of 2000, children and teenagers (0–19 years old) make up 25.4% of the population, while adults (20–64 years old) make up 55.6% and seniors (over 64 years old) make up 19%.

As of 2000, there were 360 people who were single and never married in the municipality. There were 373 married individuals, 60 widows or widowers and 43 individuals who are divorced.

As of 2000, there were 310 private households in the municipality, and an average of 2.5 persons per household. There were 84 households that consist of only one person and 32 households with five or more people. In 2000, a total of 293 apartments (85.9% of the total) were permanently occupied, while 41 apartments (12.0%) were seasonally occupied and 7 apartments (2.1%) were empty. As of 2009, the construction rate of new housing units was 3.2 new units per 1000 residents. The vacancy rate for the municipality, in 2010, was 1.02%.

The historical population is given in the following chart:

== Points of interest ==
- Gibloux Radio Tower

== Politics ==
In the 2011 federal election the most popular party was the FDP which received 29.9% of the vote. The next three most popular parties were the CVP (20.5%), the SP (17.4%) and the SVP (15.6%).

The FDP received about the same percentage of the vote as they did in the 2007 Federal election (32.6% in 2007 vs 29.9% in 2011). The CVP retained about the same popularity (24.9% in 2007), the SPS moved from fourth in 2007 (with 15.5%) to third and the SVP moved from third in 2007 (with 17.0%) to fourth. A total of 390 votes were cast in this election, of which 4 or 1.0% were invalid.

== Economy ==
As of 2010, Sorens had an unemployment rate of 2.8%. As of 2008, there were 61 people employed in the primary economic sector and about 23 businesses involved in this sector. 40 people were employed in the secondary sector and there were 7 businesses in this sector. 170 people were employed in the tertiary sector, with 24 businesses in this sector. There were 396 residents of the municipality who were employed in some capacity, of which females made up 41.4% of the workforce.

In 2008 the total number of full-time equivalent jobs was 205. The number of jobs in the primary sector was 44, all of which were in agriculture. The number of jobs in the secondary sector was 31 of which 22 or (71.0%) were in manufacturing and 9 (29.0%) were in construction. The number of jobs in the tertiary sector was 130. In the tertiary sector; 66 or 50.8% were in wholesale or retail sales or the repair of motor vehicles, 4 or 3.1% were in the movement and storage of goods, 14 or 10.8% were in a hotel or restaurant, 2 or 1.5% were the insurance or financial industry, 1 was a technical professional or scientist, 5 or 3.8% were in education and 33 or 25.4% were in health care.

In 2000, there were 71 workers who commuted into the municipality and 272 workers who commuted away. The municipality is a net exporter of workers, with about 3.8 workers leaving the municipality for every one entering. Of the working population, 2.3% used public transportation to get to work, and 74% used a private car.

== Religion ==
From the 2000 census, 720 or 86.1% were Roman Catholic, while 33 or 3.9% belonged to the Swiss Reformed Church. Of the rest of the population, there were 4 individuals (or about 0.48% of the population) who belonged to another Christian church. There was 1 individual who was Jewish, and there was 1 individual who was Islamic. There were 2 individuals who were Buddhist and 1 person who was Hindu. 35 (or about 4.19% of the population) belonged to no church, are agnostic or atheist, and 41 individuals (or about 4.90% of the population) did not answer the question.

== Education ==
In Sorens about 230 or (27.5%) of the population have completed non-mandatory upper secondary education, and 72 or (8.6%) have completed additional higher education (either university or a Fachhochschule). Of the 72 who completed tertiary schooling, 56.9% were Swiss men, 27.8% were Swiss women, 6.9% were non-Swiss men and 8.3% were non-Swiss women.

The Canton of Fribourg school system provides one year of non-obligatory Kindergarten, followed by six years of Primary school. This is followed by three years of obligatory lower Secondary school where the students are separated according to ability and aptitude. Following the lower Secondary students may attend a three or four year optional upper Secondary school. The upper Secondary school is divided into gymnasium (university preparatory) and vocational programs. After they finish the upper Secondary program, students may choose to attend a Tertiary school or continue their apprenticeship.

During the 2010-11 school year, there were a total of 82 students attending 4 classes in Sorens. A total of 166 students from the municipality attended any school, either in the municipality or outside of it. There was one kindergarten class with a total of 20 students in the municipality. The municipality had 3 primary classes and 62 students. During the same year, there were no lower secondary classes in the municipality, but 31 students attended lower secondary school in a neighboring municipality. There were no upper Secondary classes or vocational classes, but there were 14 upper Secondary students and 29 upper Secondary vocational students who attended classes in another municipality. The municipality had no non-university Tertiary classes, but there were 5 non-university Tertiary students and 4 specialized Tertiary students who attended classes in another municipality.

As of 2000, there were 42 students from Sorens who attended schools outside the municipality.
