= Corbières, Gruyère =

Corbières
- Municipality
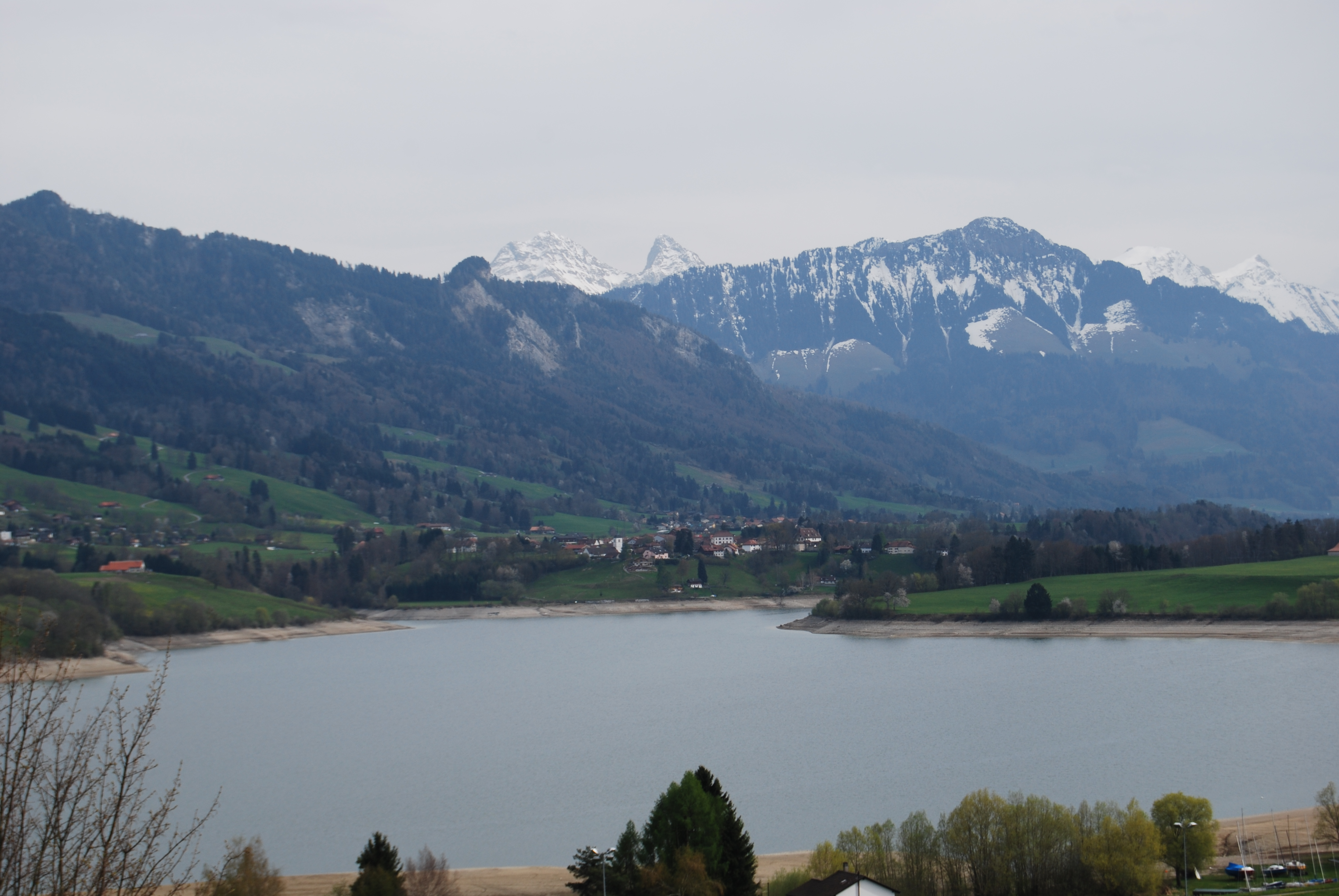

- Flag Coat of arms
- Location of Corbières
- Location within Switzerland Location within Canton of Fribourg
- Coordinates: 46°40′N 7°6′E
- Country: Switzerland
- Canton: Fribourg
- District: Gruyère

Government
  - Mayor: Syndic

Area
  - Total: 4.17 km^{2} (1.61 sq mi)
- Elevation: 714 m (2,343 ft)

Population (December 2020)
  - Total: 919
  - Density: 220/km^{2} (571/sq mi)
- Time zone: UTC+01:00 (CET)
  - Summer (DST): UTC+02:00 (CEST)
- Postal code: 1647
- SFOS number: 2129
- ISO 3166 code: CH-FR
- Surrounded by: Echarlens, Hauteville, Marsens, Villarvolard, Val-de-Charmey
- Website: https://www.corbieres.ch SFSO statistics

Corbières (French: [kɔʁbjɛʁ]; Arpitan: Corbiéres, locally Korbêre [kɔʁˈbɛʁ(ə)]) is a municipality in the district of Gruyère in the canton of Fribourg in Switzerland. On 1 January 2011 the former municipality of Villarvolard merged into the municipality of Corbières.

== History ==
Aerial view (1971)

Corbières is first mentioned around 1115 as Corbere. The municipality was formerly known by its German name Korbers, however, that name is no longer used.

== Geography ==
Corbières has an area, as of 2009, of 4.2 square kilometers (1.6 mi^{2}). Of this area, 2.2 km^{2} (0.85 mi^{2}) or 53.0% is used for agricultural purposes, while 1.64 km^{2} (0.63 mi^{2}) or 39.5% is forested. Of the rest of the land, 0.31 km^{2} (0.12 mi^{2}) or 7.5% is settled (buildings or roads) and 0.01 km^{2} (2.5 acres) or 0.2% is unproductive land.

Of the built up area, housing and buildings made up 4.3% and transportation infrastructure made up 1.9%. Out of the forested land, 35.4% of the total land area is heavily forested and 4.1% is covered with orchards or small clusters of trees. Of the agricultural land, 1.0% is used for growing crops and 18.3% is pastures and 33.7% is used for alpine pastures.

The municipality is located in the Gruyère district, on the right bank of the Saane river. It consists of the village of Corbières on the Fribourg-Bulle road.

== Coat of arms ==
The blazon of the municipal coat of arms is Gules, on a Bend Argent a Crow Sable passant.

== Demographics ==
Corbières has a population (as of December 2020) of 919. As of 2008, 6.2% of the population are resident foreign nationals. Over the last 10 years (2000–2010) the population has changed at a rate of 18%. Migration accounted for 15.5%, while births and deaths accounted for 4.8%.

Most of the population (as of 2000) speaks French (324 or 95.0%) as their first language, German is the second most common (15 or 4.4%) and Italian is the third (2 or 0.6%).

As of 2008, the population was 48.3% male and 51.7% female. The population was made up of 176 Swiss men (45.0% of the population) and 13 (3.3%) non-Swiss men. There were 187 Swiss women (47.8%) and 15 (3.8%) non-Swiss women. Of the population in the municipality, 100 or about 29.3% were born in Corbières and lived there in 2000. There were 162 or 47.5% who were born in the same canton, while 46 or 13.5% were born somewhere else in Switzerland, and 22 or 6.5% were born outside of Switzerland.

As of 2000, children and teenagers (0–19 years old) make up 24.6% of the population, while adults (20–64 years old) make up 62.6% and seniors (over 64 years old) make up 12.8%.

As of 2000, there were 134 people who were single and never married in the municipality. There were 166 married individuals, 17 widows or widowers and 24 individuals who are divorced.

As of 2000, there were 219 private households in the municipality, and an average of 2.5 persons per household. There were 34 households that consist of only one person and 10 households with five or more people. In 2000, a total of 133 apartments (76.4% of the total) were permanently occupied, while 38 apartments (21.8%) were seasonally occupied and 3 apartments (1.7%) were empty. As of 2009, the construction rate of new housing units was 12 new units per 1000 residents.

The historical population is given in the following chart:

== Heritage sites of national significance ==
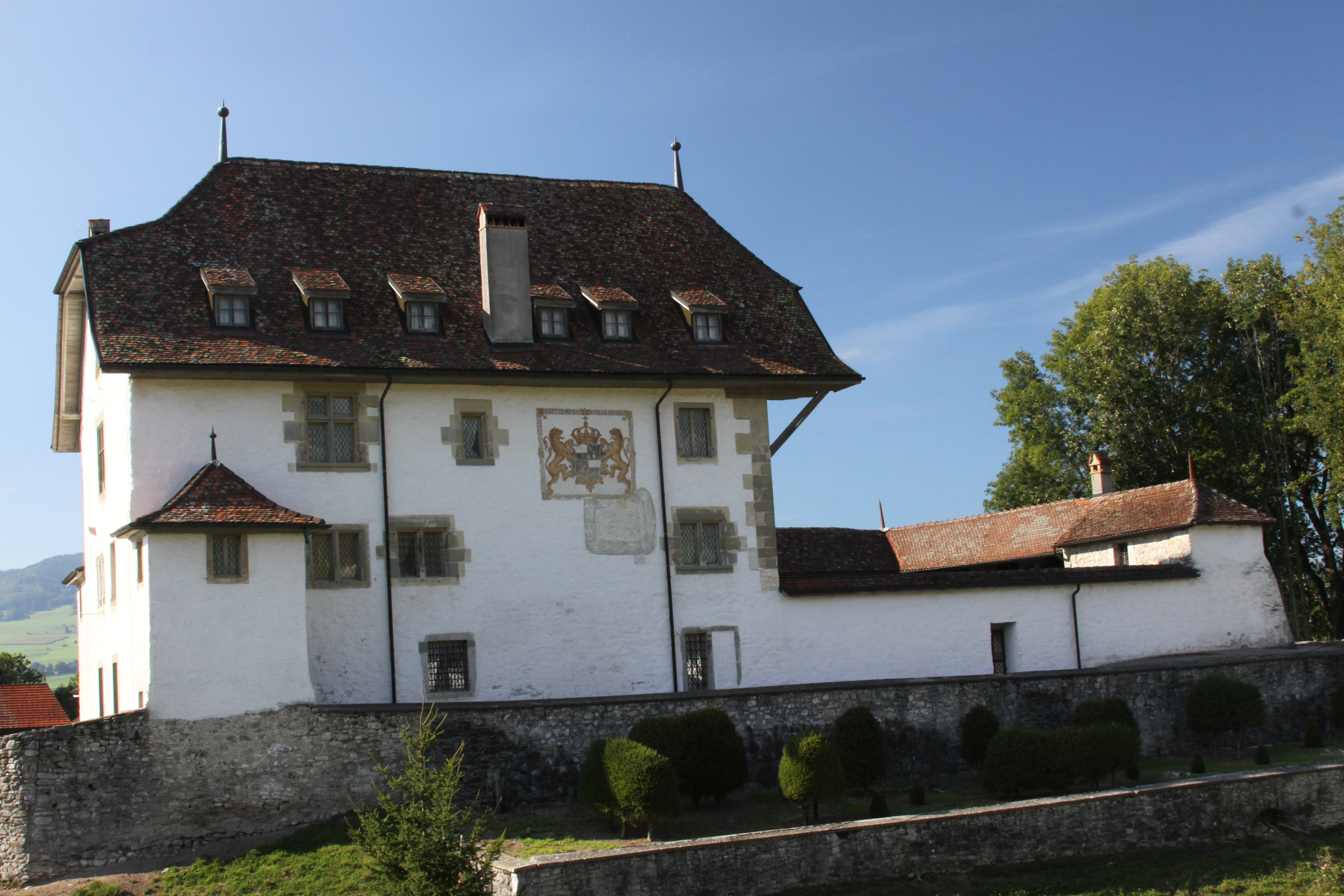
Baillival (Bailiff's) Castle

Baillival Castle is listed as a Swiss heritage site of national significance. The entire Corbières area is part of the Inventory of Swiss Heritage Sites.

== Politics ==
In the 2011 federal election the most popular party was the SVP which received 31.9% of the vote. The next three most popular parties were the SP (26.7%), the CVP (16.7%) and the FDP (10.1%).

The SVP improved their position in Corbières rising to first, from second in 2007 (with 24.0%) The SPS moved from third in 2007 (with 19.7%) to second in 2011, the CVP moved from first in 2007 (with 34.0%) to third and the FDP retained about the same popularity (12.4% in 2007). A total of 262 votes were cast in this election, of which 2 or 0.8% were invalid.

== Economy ==
As of 2010, Corbières had an unemployment rate of 2.5%. As of 2008, there were 26 people employed in the primary economic sector and about 11 businesses involved in this sector. 73 people were employed in the secondary sector and there were 10 businesses in this sector. 58 people were employed in the tertiary sector, with 17 businesses in this sector. There were 189 residents of the municipality who were employed in some capacity, of which females made up 46.0% of the workforce.

In 2008 the total number of full-time equivalent jobs was 106. The number of jobs in the primary sector was 6, all of which were in agriculture. The number of jobs in the secondary sector was 59 of which 58 or (98.3%) were in manufacturing and 1 was in construction. The number of jobs in the tertiary sector was 41. In the tertiary sector; 4 or 9.8% were in wholesale or retail sales or the repair of motor vehicles, 25 or 61.0% were in the movement and storage of goods, 3 or 7.3% were in a hotel or restaurant, 1 was a technical professional or scientist, 3 or 7.3% were in education.

In 2000, there were 42 workers who commuted into the municipality and 146 workers who commuted away. The municipality is a net exporter of workers, with about 3.5 workers leaving the municipality for every one entering. Of the working population, 4.7% used public transportation to get to work, and 75.6% used a private car.

== Religion ==
From the 2000 census, 293 or 85.9% were Roman Catholic, while 16 or 4.7% belonged to the Swiss Reformed Church. Of the rest of the population, there were 8 individuals (or about 2.35% of the population) who belonged to another Christian church. 15 (or about 4.40% of the population) belonged to no church, are agnostic or atheist, and 13 individuals (or about 3.81% of the population) did not answer the question.

== Education ==
In Corbières about 119 or (34.9%) of the population have completed non-mandatory upper secondary education, and 40 or (11.7%) have completed additional higher education (either university or a Fachhochschule). Of the 40 who completed tertiary schooling, 67.5% were Swiss men, 22.5% were Swiss women.

The Canton of Fribourg school system provides one year of non-obligatory Kindergarten, followed by six years of Primary school. This is followed by three years of obligatory lower Secondary school where the students are separated according to ability and aptitude. Following the lower Secondary students may attend a three or four year optional upper Secondary school. The upper Secondary school is divided into gymnasium (university preparatory) and vocational programs. After they finish the upper Secondary program, students may choose to attend a Tertiary school or continue their apprenticeship.

During the 2010-11 school year, there were a total of 54 students attending 3 classes in Corbières. A total of 67 students from the municipality attended any school, either in the municipality or outside of it. There were no kindergarten classes in the municipality, but 4 students attended kindergarten in a neighboring municipality. The municipality had 3 primary classes and 54 students. During the same year, there were no lower secondary classes in the municipality, but 13 students attended lower secondary school in a neighboring municipality. There were no upper Secondary classes or vocational classes, but there were 5 upper Secondary students and 14 upper Secondary vocational students who attended classes in another municipality. The municipality had no non-university Tertiary classes, but there was one specialized Tertiary student who attended classes in another municipality.

As of 2000, there were 29 students in Corbières who came from another municipality, while 46 residents attended schools outside the municipality.
