= Villarbeney =

Former municipality, canton of Fribourg

- Former municipality
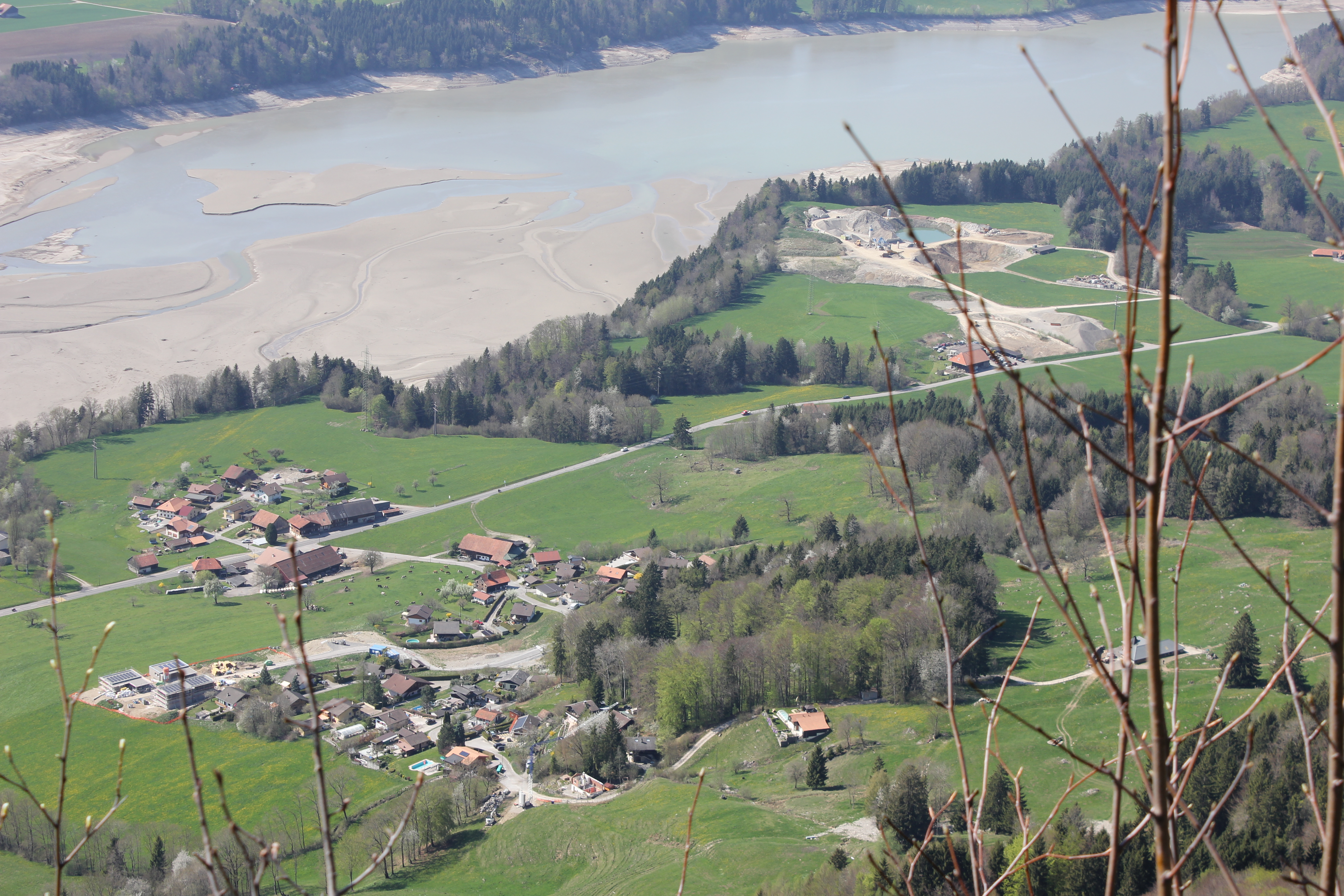
- View of Villarbeney

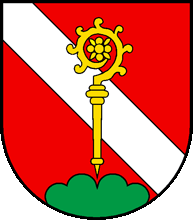
- Coat of arms
- Location of Villarbeney
- Location within Switzerland Location within Canton of Fribourg
- Coordinates: 46.628892°N 7.108614°E
- Country: Switzerland
- Canton: Fribourg
- District: Gruyère
- Municipality: Botterens

Population (2000)
  - Total: 105
- Time zone: UTC+01:00 (CET)
  - Summer (DST): UTC+02:00 (CEST)
- ISO 3166 code: CH-FR
- Website

Villarbeney is a former municipality in the Gruyère district of the canton of Fribourg, Switzerland. Since 2006 it has been part of the municipality of Botterens. It lies on the cantonal road from Fribourg via La Roche to Bulle, on the shore of the Lake of Gruyère.

== History ==
Villarbeney is mentioned in the 13th century as Villar bene. It was part of the lordship of Corbières and, from 1553, of the bailiwick of Corbières. It belonged to the district of Gruyère from 1798 to 1803 and from 1815 to 1830, and to the district of Corbières from 1803 to 1815 and from 1830 to 1848. Humilimont Abbey held land there from the end of the 14th century.

Villarbeney belonged to the parish of Broc, and from 1871 to that of Botterens. In 1779 the village was struck by fire. From 1887 to 1982 Villarbeney shared a municipal council with the municipality of Botterens. The village has kept an essentially agricultural character, specializing in cattle breeding.

Villarbeney had 50 inhabitants in 1811, 80 in 1831, 75 in 1850, 77 in 1900, 75 in 1950 and 105 in 2000.

== Bibliography ==
- B. Weber, Villarbeney, manuscript, Collège Saint-Michel, Fribourg, 1985
