= Bois-d'Amont, Switzerland =

Bois-d'Amont
- Municipality
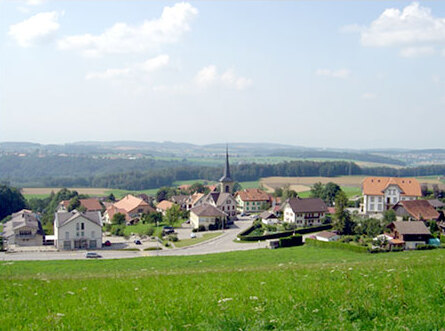
- Arconciel village

- Flag Coat of arms
- Location of Bois-d'Amont
- Location within Switzerland Location within Canton of Fribourg
- Coordinates: 46°45′N 7°7′E
- Country: Switzerland
- Canton: Fribourg
- District: Sarine

Government
  - Mayor: Syndic

Area
  - Total: 12.24 km^{2} (4.73 sq mi)

Population (December 2019)
  - Total: 2,273
  - Density: 185.7/km^{2} (481.0/sq mi)
- Time zone: UTC+01:00 (CET)
  - Summer (DST): UTC+02:00 (CEST)
- Postal code: 1731, 1732, 1724
- SFOS number: 2238
- ISO 3166 code: CH-FR
- Surrounded by: Corpataux-Magnedens, Hauterive, Marly, Rossens, Treyvaux
- Website: https://www.bois-damont.ch SFSO statistics

Bois-d'Amont (French pronunciation: [bwɑ damɔ̃]) is a municipality in the district of Sarine in the canton of Fribourg in Switzerland. On 1 January 2021 the former municipalities of Arconciel, Ependes and Senèdes merged to form the new municipality of Bois-d'Amont.

== History ==
=== Arconciel ===
Arconciel is first mentioned in 1082 as castrum Arconciacum. The municipality was formerly known by its German name Ergenzach, however, that name is no longer used.

=== Épendes ===
Épendes is first mentioned in 1142 as Spindes.

=== Senèdes ===
Senèdes is first mentioned in 1233 as Senaide.

== Geography ==
After the merger, Bois-d'Amont has an area, (as of the 2004/09 survey), of 12.28 km^{2} (4.74 sq mi).

== Demographics ==
The new municipality has a population (as of December 2020) of 2,273.

== Historic population ==
The historical population is given in the following chart:

== Heritage sites of national significance ==
The Farm House at La Souche 1, the Mesolithic shelter at La Souche and the medieval village at Vers-le-Château are listed as Swiss heritage site of national significance.

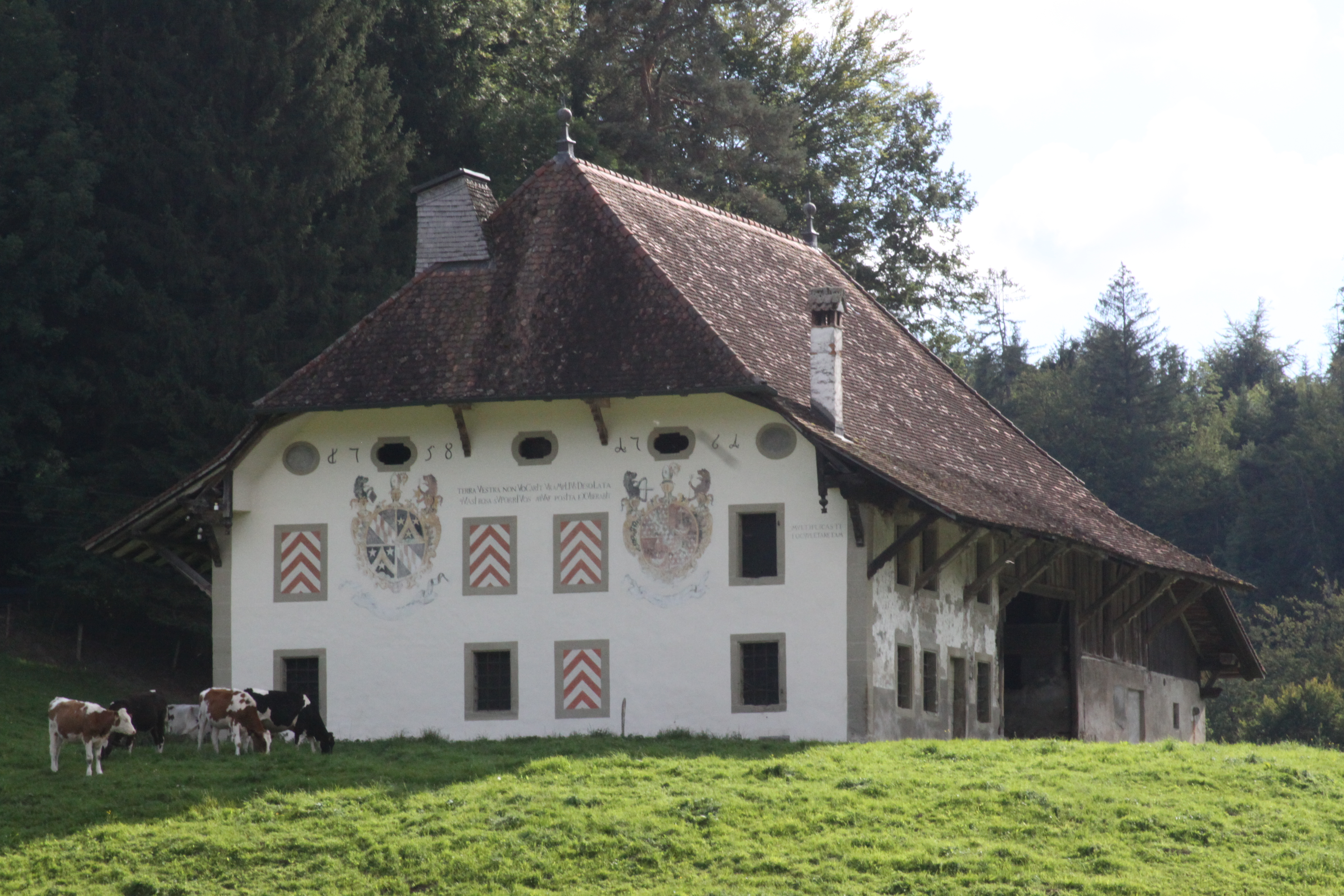
Farm House at La Souche 1

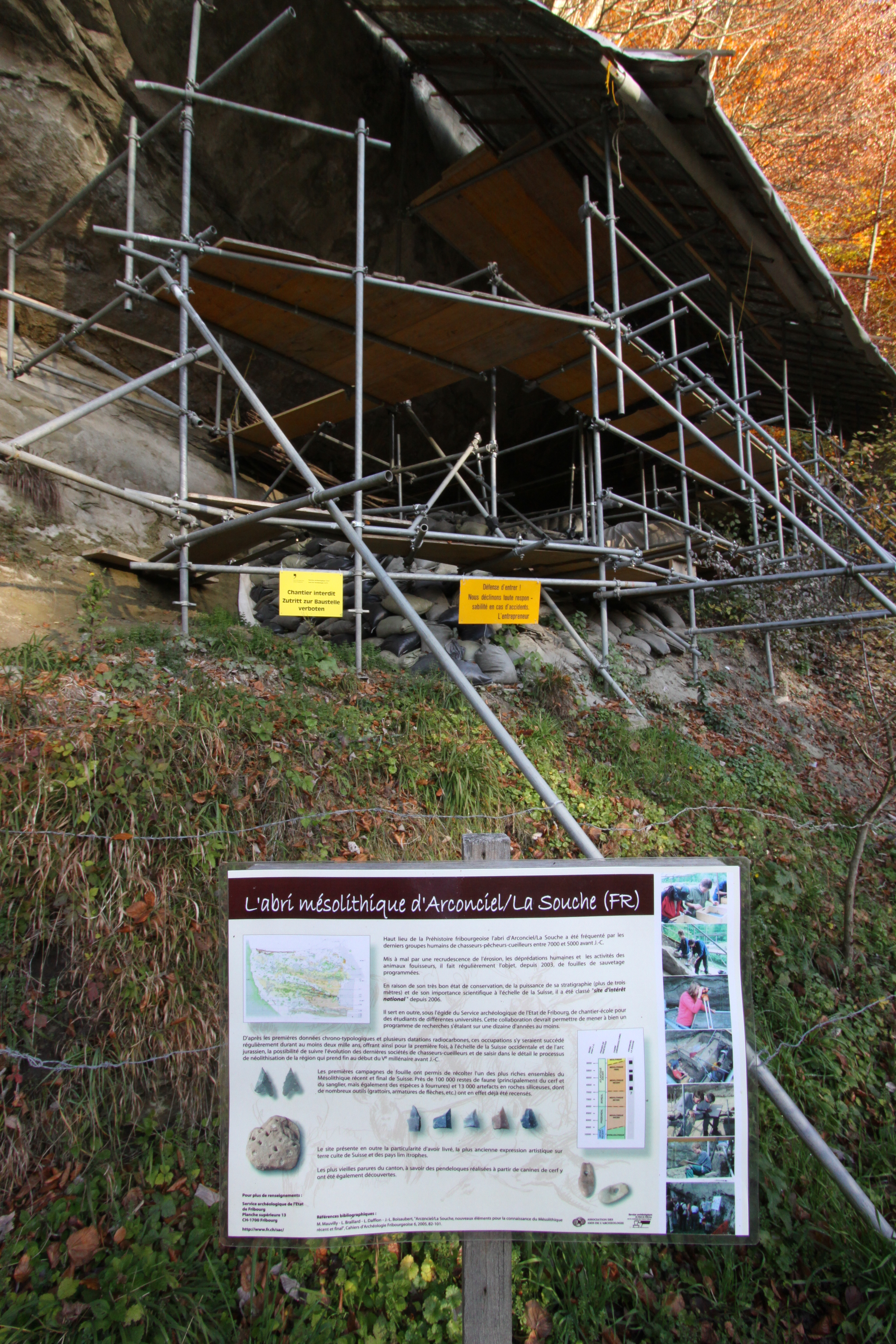
Mesolithic shelter at La Souche

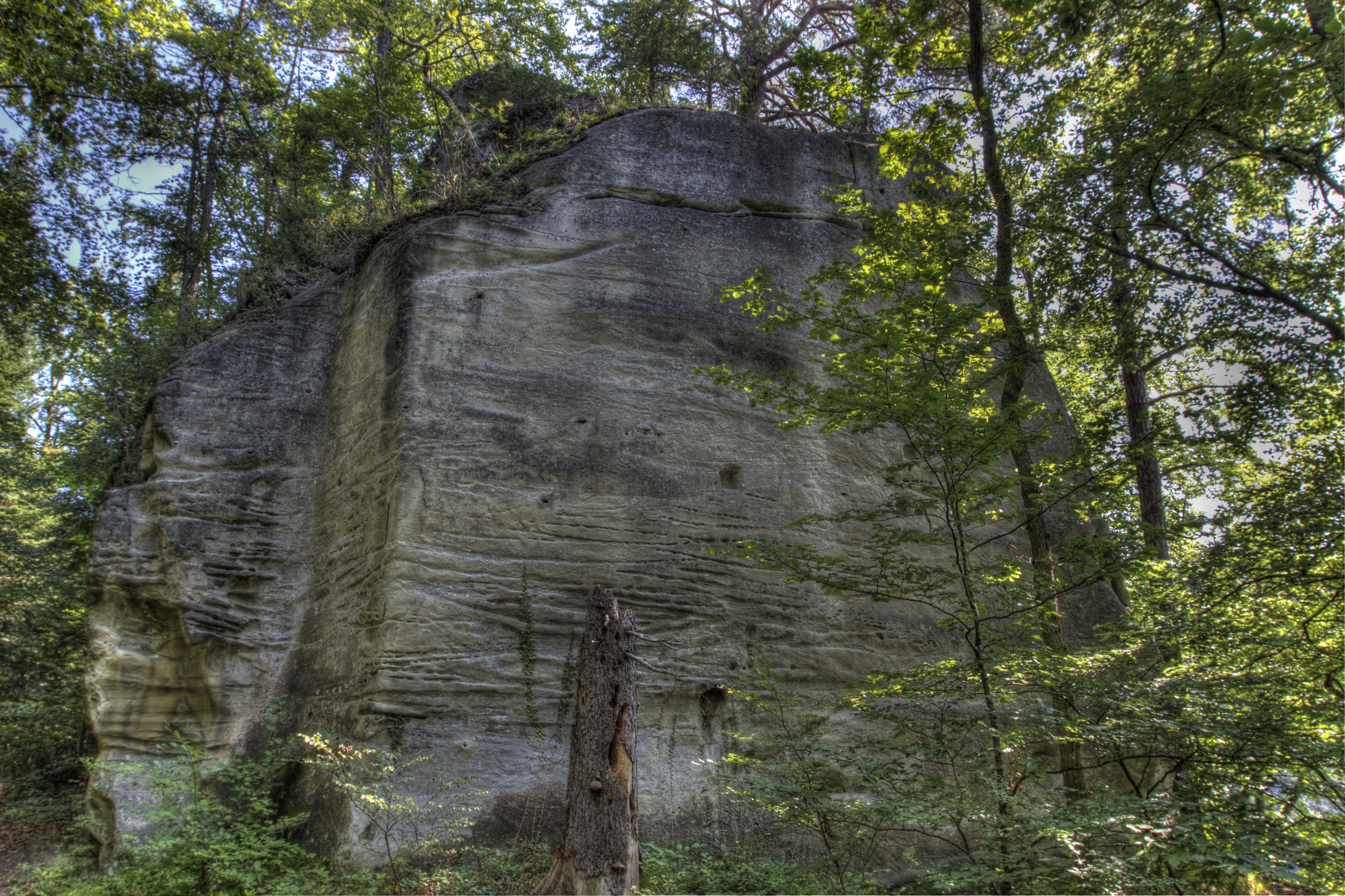
Medieval village at Vers-le-Château
