= Senèdes =

- Former municipality
- Coat of arms
- Location of Senèdes
- Location within Switzerland Location within Canton of Fribourg
- Coordinates: 46°45′N 7°9′E
- Country: Switzerland
- Canton: Fribourg
- District: Sarine

Government
  - Mayor: Syndic

Area
  - Total: 0.50 km^{2} (0.19 sq mi)
- Elevation: 748 m (2,454 ft)

Population (December 2019)
  - Total: 150
  - Density: 300/km^{2} (780/sq mi)
- Time zone: UTC+01:00 (CET)
  - Summer (DST): UTC+02:00 (CEST)
- Postal code: 1724
- SFOS number: 2225
- ISO 3166 code: CH-FR
- Surrounded by: Arconciel, Ependes, Ferpicloz, Le Mouret, Treyvaux
- Website: www.communesenedes.ch

Senèdes (French: [sənɛd], Franco-Provençal: [ʃəˈnedə]) is a former municipality in the district of Sarine in the canton of Fribourg in Switzerland. On 1 January 2021 the former municipalities of Arconciel, Ependes and Senèdes merged to form the new municipality of Bois-d'Amont.

== History ==
Senèdes is first mentioned in 1233 as Senaide.

== Geography ==
Senèdes had an area, as of 2009, of 0.5 square kilometers (0.19 mi^{2}). Of this area, 0.37 km^{2} (0.14 mi^{2}) or 74.0% is used for agricultural purposes, while 0.05 km^{2} (0.019 mi^{2}) or 10.0% is forested. Of the rest of the land, 0.08 km^{2} (20 acres) or 16.0% is settled (buildings or roads).

Of the built up area, industrial buildings made up 2.0% of the total area while housing and buildings made up 10.0% and transportation infrastructure made up 4.0%. Out of the forested land, all of the forested land area is covered with heavy forests. Of the agricultural land, 50.0% is used for growing crops and 24.0% is pastures.

The former municipality is located in the Sarine district.

== Coat of arms ==
The blazon of the municipal coat of arms is Per saltire Argent and Gules in chef Cross couped pattee Sable.

== Demographics ==
Senèdes had a population (as of 2019) of 150. As of 2008, 7.6% of the population are resident foreign nationals. Over the last 10 years (2000–2010) the population has changed at a rate of 1.7%. Migration accounted for -6.1%, while births and deaths accounted for 4.3%.

Most of the population (as of 2000) speaks French (103 or 94.5%) as their first language, German is the second most common (5 or 4.6%) and Italian is the third (1 or 0.9%).

As of 2008, the population was 51.7% male and 48.3% female. The population was made up of 57 Swiss men (48.3% of the population) and 4 (3.4%) non-Swiss men. There were 53 Swiss women (44.9%) and 4 (3.4%) non-Swiss women. Of the population in the municipality, 32 or about 29.4% were born in Senèdes and lived there in 2000. There were 60 or 55.0% who were born in the same canton, while 13 or 11.9% were born somewhere else in Switzerland, and 4 or 3.7% were born outside of Switzerland.

As of 2000, children and teenagers (0–19 years old) make up 21.1% of the population, while adults (20–64 years old) make up 70.6% and seniors (over 64 years old) make up 8.3%.

As of 2000, there were 40 people who were single and never married in the municipality. There were 56 married individuals, 4 widows or widowers and 9 individuals who are divorced.

As of 2000, there were 47 private households in the municipality, and an average of 2.3 persons per household. There were 12 households that consist of only one person and 1 households with five or more people. In 2000, a total of 47 apartments (92.2% of the total) were permanently occupied, while 2 apartments (3.9%) were seasonally occupied and 2 apartments (3.9%) were empty. The vacancy rate for the municipality, in 2010, was 1.89%.

The historical population is given in the following chart:

== Politics ==
In the 2011 federal election the most popular party was the SVP which received 37.4% of the vote. The next three most popular parties were the SPS (21.5%), the FDP (14.4%) and the Green Party (10.4%).

The SVP received about the same percentage of the vote as they did in the 2007 Federal election (35.9% in 2007 vs 37.4% in 2011). The SPS retained about the same popularity (19.6% in 2007), the FDP retained about the same popularity (16.8% in 2007) and the Green moved from below fourth place in 2007 to fourth. A total of 59 votes were cast in this election, of which 1 or 1.7% was invalid.

== Economy ==
As of 2010, Senèdes had an unemployment rate of 1.5%. As of 2008, there were 6 people employed in the primary economic sector and about 3 businesses involved in this sector. 40 people were employed in the secondary sector and there was 1 business in this sector. 1 person was employed in the tertiary sector, with 1 business in this sector. There were 67 residents of the municipality who were employed in some capacity, of which females made up 41.8% of the workforce.

In 2008 the total number of full-time equivalent jobs was 44. The number of jobs in the primary sector was 3, all in agriculture. The number of jobs in the secondary sector was 40, all in construction. In the tertiary sector there was one job, in the information industry.

In 2000, there were 19 workers who commuted into the municipality and 51 workers who commuted away. The municipality is a net exporter of workers, with about 2.7 workers leaving the municipality for every one entering. Of the working population, 4.5% used public transportation to get to work, and 80.6% used a private car.

== Religion ==
From the 2000 census, 101 or 92.7% were Roman Catholic, while 5 or 4.6% belonged to the Swiss Reformed Church. Of the rest of the population, there was 1 individual who belongs to the Christian Catholic Church. 1 (or about 0.92% of the population) belonged to no church, are agnostic or atheist, and 1 individuals (or about 0.92% of the population) did not answer the question.

== Education ==
In Senèdes about 47 or (43.1%) of the population have completed non-mandatory upper secondary education, and 15 or (13.8%) have completed additional higher education (either university or a Fachhochschule). Of the 15 who completed tertiary schooling, 60.0% were Swiss men, 33.3% were Swiss women.

The Canton of Fribourg school system provides one year of non-obligatory Kindergarten, followed by six years of Primary school. This is followed by three years of obligatory lower Secondary school where the students are separated according to ability and aptitude. Following the lower Secondary students may attend a three or four year optional upper Secondary school. The upper Secondary school is divided into gymnasium (university preparatory) and vocational programs. After they finish the upper Secondary program, students may choose to attend a Tertiary school or continue their apprenticeship.

During the 2010–11 school year, there were no students attending school in Senèdes, but a total of 24 students attended school in other municipalities. Of these students, 3 were in kindergarten, 9 were in a primary school, 5 were in a mandatory secondary school, 2 were in an upper secondary school and 4 were in a vocational secondary program. There was one tertiary student from the municipality.

As of 2000, there were 14 students from Senèdes who attended schools outside the municipality.
