= Épendes, Fribourg =

Épendes
- Former municipality
- Coat of arms
- Location of Épendes
- Location within Switzerland Location within Canton of Fribourg
- Coordinates: 46°45′N 7°9′E
- Country: Switzerland
- Canton: Fribourg
- District: Sarine

Government
  - Mayor: Syndic

Area
  - Total: 5.63 km^{2} (2.17 sq mi)
- Elevation: 750 m (2,460 ft)

Population (December 2019)
  - Total: 1,085
  - Density: 193/km^{2} (499/sq mi)
- Time zone: UTC+01:00 (CET)
  - Summer (DST): UTC+02:00 (CEST)
- Postal code: 1731
- SFOS number: 2189
- ISO 3166 code: CH-FR
- Localities: Le Petit-Épendes, Sales
- Surrounded by: Arconciel, Ferpicloz, Le Mouret, Marly, Senèdes, Villarsel-sur-Marly
- Website: ependes.ch

Épendes (French: [epɑ̃d]; Arpitan: Ependes, locally Èpindè [ɛˈpɛ̃dɛ]) is a former municipality in the district of Sarine in the canton of Fribourg in Switzerland. Its former German name was Spinz. In 1977, the former municipality of Sales merged into Épendes. On 1 January 2021 the former municipalities of Arconciel, Ependes and Senèdes merged to form the new municipality of Bois-d'Amont.

The asteroid 129342 Ependes is named in its honour.

== History ==
Épendes is first mentioned in 1142 as Spindes.

== Geography ==
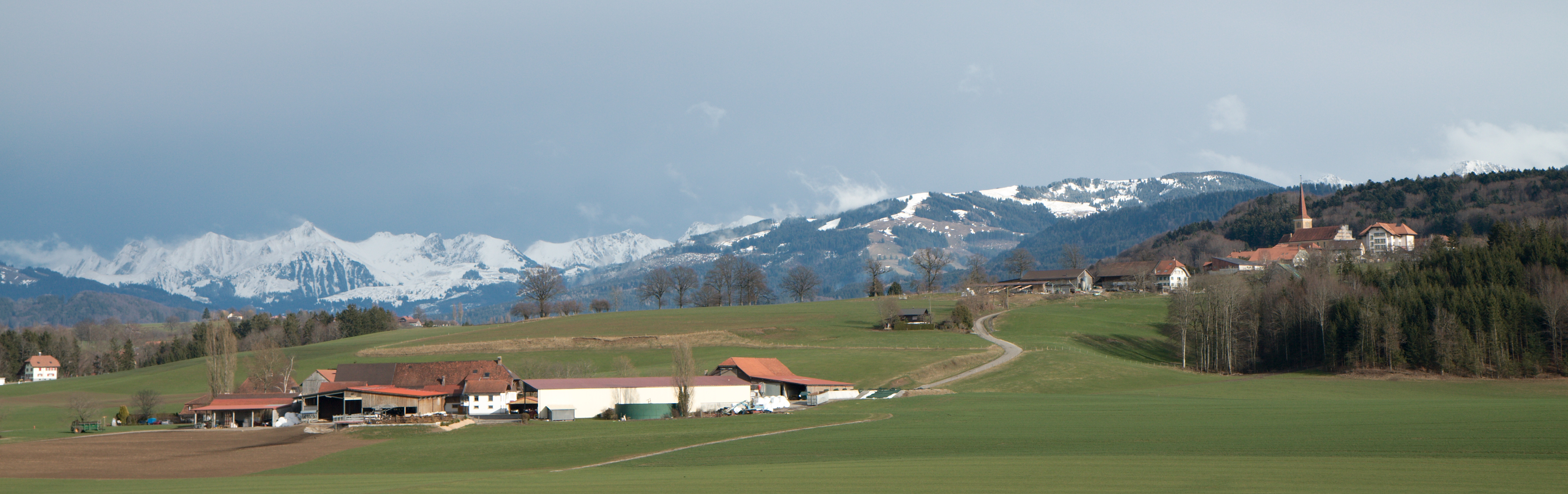
Petit Épendes

Épendes had an area, as of 2009, of 5.6 square kilometers (2.2 mi^{2}). Of this area, 3.72 km^{2} (1.44 mi^{2}) or 66.3% is used for agricultural purposes, while 1.33 km^{2} (0.51 mi^{2}) or 23.7% is forested. Of the rest of the land, 0.58 km^{2} (0.22 mi^{2}) or 10.3% is settled (buildings or roads).

Of the built up area, housing and buildings made up 6.8% and transportation infrastructure made up 2.5%. Out of the forested land, all of the forested land area is covered with heavy forests. Of the agricultural land, 39.9% is used for growing crops and 25.5% is pastures.

The former municipality is located in the Sarine district. It consists of the village of Épendes, the hamlet of Le Petit-Épendes, and, since 1977, the village of Sales.

== Coat of arms ==
The blazon of the municipal coat of arms is Azure on a chief Or a Cross pattee couped of the first and overall in bend a lance Argent with a Flag Gules.

== Demographics ==
Épendes had a population (as of 2019) of 1,085. As of 2008, 8.5% of the population are resident foreign nationals. Over the last 10 years (2000–2010) the population has changed at a rate of 3.4%. Migration accounted for -2.3%, while births and deaths accounted for 5.2%.

Most of the population (as of 2000) speaks French (907 or 87.7%) as their first language, German is the second most common (96 or 9.3%) and Portuguese is the third (5 or 0.5%). There are 4 people who speak Italian and 1 person who speaks Romansh.

As of 2008, the population was 50.6% male and 49.4% female. The population was made up of 491 Swiss men (46.6% of the population) and 42 (4.0%) non-Swiss men. There were 469 Swiss women (44.5%) and 51 (4.8%) non-Swiss women. Of the population in the municipality, 344 or about 33.3% were born in Épendes and lived there in 2000. There were 463 or 44.8% who were born in the same canton, while 114 or 11.0% were born somewhere else in Switzerland, and 99 or 9.6% were born outside of Switzerland.

As of 2000, children and teenagers (0–19 years old) make up 30.4% of the population, while adults (20–64 years old) make up 62.4% and seniors (over 64 years old) make up 7.3%.

As of 2000, there were 454 people who were single and never married in the municipality. There were 513 married individuals, 34 widows or widowers and 33 individuals who are divorced.

As of 2000, there were 354 private households in the municipality, and an average of 2.9 persons per household. There were 61 households that consist of only one person and 41 households with five or more people. In 2000, a total of 342 apartments (94.5% of the total) were permanently occupied, while 13 apartments (3.6%) were seasonally occupied and 7 apartments (1.9%) were empty. As of 2009, the construction rate of new housing units was 6.6 new units per 1000 residents. The vacancy rate for the municipality, in 2010, was 0.75%.

The historical population is given in the following chart:

== Politics ==
In the 2011 federal election the most popular party was the SPS which received 26.9% of the vote. The next three most popular parties were the CVP (22.1%), the SVP (19.7%) and the FDP (10.5%).

The SPS improved their position in Épendes rising to first, from second in 2007 (with 25.6%) The CVP moved from first in 2007 (with 27.3%) to second in 2011, the SVP retained about the same popularity (20.7% in 2007) and the FDP retained about the same popularity (11.3% in 2007). A total of 370 votes were cast in this election, of which 5 or 1.4% were invalid.

== Economy ==
As of 2010, Épendes had an unemployment rate of 1.5%. As of 2008, there were 46 people employed in the primary economic sector and about 18 businesses involved in this sector. 51 people were employed in the secondary sector and there were 8 businesses in this sector. 80 people were employed in the tertiary sector, with 27 businesses in this sector. There were 520 residents of the municipality who were employed in some capacity, of which females made up 42.1% of the workforce.

In 2008 the total number of full-time equivalent jobs was 142. The number of jobs in the primary sector was 35, of which 32 were in agriculture and 3 were in forestry or lumber production. The number of jobs in the secondary sector was 49 of which 44 or (89.8%) were in manufacturing and 5 (10.2%) were in construction. The number of jobs in the tertiary sector was 58. In the tertiary sector; 21 or 36.2% were in wholesale or retail sales or the repair of motor vehicles, 3 or 5.2% were in the movement and storage of goods, 2 or 3.4% were in a hotel or restaurant, 1 was in the information industry, 1 was the insurance or financial industry, 3 or 5.2% were technical professionals or scientists, 9 or 15.5% were in education and 7 or 12.1% were in health care.

In 2000, there were 66 workers who commuted into the municipality and 401 workers who commuted away. The municipality is a net exporter of workers, with about 6.1 workers leaving the municipality for every one entering. Of the working population, 9.2% used public transportation to get to work, and 72.9% used a private car.

== Religion ==
From the 2000 census, 868 or 83.9% were Roman Catholic, while 59 or 5.7% belonged to the Swiss Reformed Church. Of the rest of the population, there were 4 members of an Orthodox church (or about 0.39% of the population), and there were 18 individuals (or about 1.74% of the population) who belonged to another Christian church. There were 11 (or about 1.06% of the population) who were Islamic. 48 (or about 4.64% of the population) belonged to no church, are agnostic or atheist, and 34 individuals (or about 3.29% of the population) did not answer the question.

== Education ==
In Épendes about 352 or (34.0%) of the population have completed non-mandatory upper secondary education, and 146 or (14.1%) have completed additional higher education (either university or a Fachhochschule). Of the 146 who completed tertiary schooling, 65.1% were Swiss men, 30.1% were Swiss women, 3.4% were non-Swiss men.

The Canton of Fribourg school system provides one year of non-obligatory Kindergarten, followed by six years of Primary school. This is followed by three years of obligatory lower Secondary school where the students are separated according to ability and aptitude. Following the lower Secondary students may attend a three or four year optional upper Secondary school. The upper Secondary school is divided into gymnasium (university preparatory) and vocational programs. After they finish the upper Secondary program, students may choose to attend a Tertiary school or continue their apprenticeship.

During the 2010–11 school year, there were a total of 153 students attending 7 classes in Épendes. A total of 274 students from the municipality attended any school, either in the municipality or outside of it. There were 2 kindergarten classes with a total of 43 students in the municipality. The municipality had 5 primary classes and 110 students. During the same year, there were no lower secondary classes in the municipality, but 67 students attended lower secondary school in a neighboring municipality. There were no upper Secondary classes or vocational classes, but there were 35 upper Secondary students and 43 upper Secondary vocational students who attended classes in another municipality. The municipality had no non-university Tertiary classes, but there were 3 non-university Tertiary students and 2 specialized Tertiary students who attended classes in another municipality.

As of 2000, there were 13 students in Épendes who came from another municipality, while 98 residents attended schools outside the municipality.
