= Villarsel-sur-Marly =

- Municipality
- Coat of arms
- Location of Villarsel-sur-Marly
- Location within Switzerland Location within Canton of Fribourg
- Coordinates: 46°46′N 7°10′E
- Country: Switzerland
- Canton: Fribourg
- District: Sarine

Government
  - Mayor: Syndic

Area
  - Total: 1.43 km^{2} (0.55 sq mi)
- Elevation: 736 m (2,415 ft)

Population (December 2020)
  - Total: 75
  - Density: 52/km^{2} (140/sq mi)
- Time zone: UTC+01:00 (CET)
  - Summer (DST): UTC+02:00 (CEST)
- Postal code: 1723
- SFOS number: 2230
- ISO 3166 code: CH-FR
- Surrounded by: Ependes, Le Mouret, Marly, Pierrafortscha, Tentlingen
- Website: www.villarsel-sur-marly.ch

Villarsel-sur-Marly (Arpitan: Velarzél [vɛʁlaˈʃi]) is a municipality in the district of Sarine in the canton of Fribourg in Switzerland.

== History ==
Villarsel-sur-Marly is first mentioned in 1278 as Villarser.

== Geography ==
Villarsel-sur-Marly has an area, as of 2009, of 1.4 square kilometers (0.54 mi^{2}). Of this area, 1.07 km^{2} (0.41 mi^{2}) or 75.9% is used for agricultural purposes, while 0.26 km^{2} (0.10 mi^{2}) or 18.4% is forested. Of the rest of the land, 0.06 km^{2} (15 acres) or 4.3% is settled (buildings or roads), 0.04 km^{2} (9.9 acres) or 2.8% is either rivers or lakes.

Of the built up area, housing and buildings made up 2.8% and transportation infrastructure made up 1.4%. Out of the forested land, all of the forested land area is covered with heavy forests. Of the agricultural land, 39.7% is used for growing crops and 35.5% is pastures. All the water in the municipality is flowing water.

The municipality is located in the Sarine district, on the left bank of the Gérine.

== Coat of arms ==
The blazon of the municipal coat of arms is Gules a Fox sejant Or and in chief sinister a Maltese Cross Argent.

== Demographics ==
Villarsel-sur-Marly has a population (as of December 2020) of 75. As of 2008, 13.5% of the population are resident foreign nationals. Over the last 10 years (2000–2010) the population has changed at a rate of 24.6%. Migration accounted for 7.2%, while births and deaths accounted for 10.1%.

Most of the population (as of 2000) speaks French (66 or 89.2%) as their first language, German is the second most common (5 or 6.8%) and Italian is the third (3 or 4.1%).

As of 2008, the population was 48.4% male and 51.6% female. The population was made up of 35 Swiss men (36.8% of the population) and 11 (11.6%) non-Swiss men. There were 40 Swiss women (42.1%) and 9 (9.5%) non-Swiss women. Of the population in the municipality, 28 or about 37.8% were born in Villarsel-sur-Marly and lived there in 2000. There were 33 or 44.6% who were born in the same canton, while 8 or 10.8% were born somewhere else in Switzerland, and 5 or 6.8% were born outside of Switzerland.

As of 2000, children and teenagers (0–19 years old) make up 36.5% of the population, while adults (20–64 years old) make up 54.1% and seniors (over 64 years old) make up 9.5%.

As of 2000, there were 41 people who were single and never married in the municipality. There were 30 married individuals, 2 widows or widowers and 1 individuals who are divorced.

As of 2000, there were 24 private households in the municipality, and an average of 3.0 persons per household. There were 4 households that consist of only one person and 4 households with five or more people. In 2000, a total of 24 apartments (92.3% of the total) were permanently occupied, while 2 apartments (7.7%) were seasonally occupied.

The historical population is given in the following chart:

== Heritage sites of national significance ==
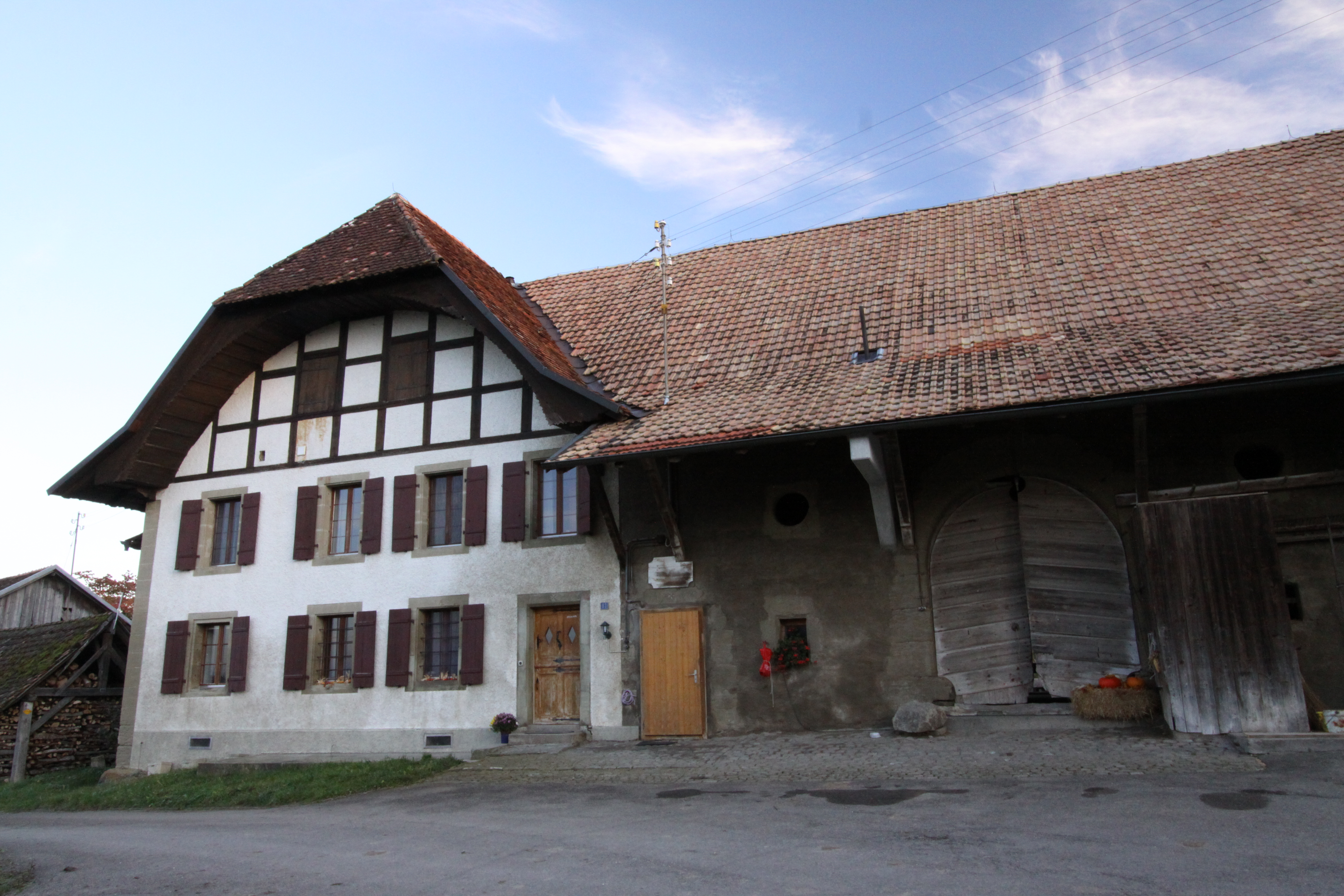
Farm house of the commandry of Saint-Jean

The farm house of the commandry of Saint-Jean is listed as a Swiss heritage site of national significance. The entire hamlet of Villarsel-sur-Marly is part of the Inventory of Swiss Heritage Sites.

== Politics ==
In the 2011 federal election, the most popular party was the CVP which received 26.5% of the vote. The next three most popular parties were the FDP (18.8%), the SPS (15.5%) and the Green Party (12.2%).

The CVP lost about 10.1% of the vote when compared to the 2007 Federal election (36.7% in 2007 vs 26.5% in 2011). The FDP moved from third in 2007 (with 17.1%) to second in 2011, the SPS moved from below fourth place in 2007 to third and the Green moved from second in 2007 (with 21.9%) to fourth. A total of 37 votes were cast in this election, of which 2 or 5.4% were invalid.

== Economy ==
As of 2010, Villarsel-sur-Marly had an unemployment rate of 1%. As of 2008, there were 11 people employed in the primary economic sector and about 5 businesses involved in this sector. No one was employed in the secondary sector or the tertiary sector. There were 33 residents of the municipality who were employed in some capacity, of which females made up 39.4% of the workforce.

In 2008 the total number of full-time equivalent jobs was 9. The number of jobs in the primary sector was 9, all of which were in agriculture. There were no jobs in the secondary or tertiary sectors.

In 2000, there were 25 workers who commuted away from the municipality. Of the working population, 12.1% used public transportation to get to work, and 63.6% used a private car.

== Religion ==
From the 2000 census, 65 or 87.8% were Roman Catholic, while 5 or 6.8% belonged to the Swiss Reformed Church. 2 (or about 2.70% of the population) belonged to no church, are agnostic or atheist, and 2 individuals (or about 2.70% of the population) did not answer the question.

== Education ==
In Villarsel-sur-Marly about 22 or (29.7%) of the population have completed non-mandatory upper secondary education, and 14 or (18.9%) have completed additional higher education (either university or a Fachhochschule). Of the 14 who completed tertiary schooling, 50.0% were Swiss men, 50.0% were Swiss women.

The Canton of Fribourg school system provides one year of non-obligatory Kindergarten, followed by six years of Primary school. This is followed by three years of obligatory lower Secondary school where the students are separated according to ability and aptitude. Following the lower Secondary students may attend a three or four year optional upper Secondary school. The upper Secondary school is divided into gymnasium (university preparatory) and vocational programs. After they finish the upper Secondary program, students may choose to attend a Tertiary school or continue their apprenticeship.

During the 2010-11 school year, there were no students attending school in Villarsel-sur-Marly, but a total of 16 students attended school in other municipalities. Of these students, none of them were in kindergarten, 4 were in a primary school, 6 were in a mandatory secondary school, 4 were in an upper secondary school and 2 were in a vocational secondary program. There were no tertiary students from this municipality.

As of 2000, there were 17 students from Villarsel-sur-Marly who attended schools outside the municipality.
