= Arconciel =

- Former municipality
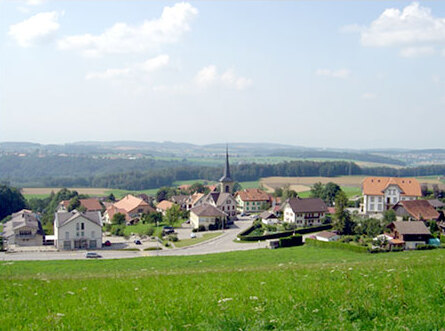
- Arconciel village

- Flag Coat of arms
- Location of Arconciel
- Location within Switzerland Location within Canton of Fribourg
- Coordinates: 46°45′N 7°7′E
- Country: Switzerland
- Canton: Fribourg
- District: Sarine

Government
  - Mayor: Syndic

Area
  - Total: 6.11 km^{2} (2.36 sq mi)
- Elevation: 734 m (2,408 ft)
- Highest elevation (En Monternou): 828 m (2,717 ft)
- Lowest elevation (At Hauterive): 570 m (1,870 ft)

Population (December 2019)
  - Total: 1,038
  - Density: 170/km^{2} (440/sq mi)
- Time zone: UTC+01:00 (CET)
  - Summer (DST): UTC+02:00 (CEST)
- Postal code: 1732
- SFOS number: 2171
- ISO 3166 code: CH-FR
- Surrounded by: Corpataux-Magnedens, Ependes, Hauterive, Marly, Rossens, Senèdes, Treyvaux
- Twin towns: Arconcey (France)
- Website: arconciel.ch

Arconciel (French: [aʁkɔ̃sjɛl]; Arpitan: Arconcié, locally Arkonhyi [aʁkɔ̃ˈçi]) is a former municipality in the district of Sarine in the canton of Fribourg in Switzerland. On 1 January 2021 the former municipalities of Arconciel, Ependes and Senèdes merged to form the new municipality of Bois-d'Amont.

== History ==
Arconciel is first mentioned in 1082 as castrum Arconciacum. The municipality was formerly known by its German name Ergenzach, however, that name is no longer used.

== Geography ==
Aerial view (1964)

Arconciel had an area, as of 2009, of 6.2 square kilometers (2.4 mi^{2}). Of this area, 3.53 km^{2} (1.36 mi^{2}) or 57.2% is used for agricultural purposes, while 1.88 km^{2} (0.73 mi^{2}) or 30.5% is forested. Of the rest of the land, 0.52 km^{2} (0.20 mi^{2}) or 8.4% is settled (buildings or roads), 0.17 km^{2} (0.066 mi^{2}) or 2.8% is either rivers or lakes and 0.01 km^{2} (2.5 acres) or 0.2% is unproductive land.

Of the built up area, housing and buildings made up 3.9% and transportation infrastructure made up 2.3%. Power and water infrastructure as well as other special developed areas made up 2.1% of the area Out of the forested land, all of the forested land area is covered with heavy forests. Of the agricultural land, 38.6% is used for growing crops and 18.2% is pastures. All the water in the municipality is flowing water.

The former municipality is located in the Sarine district.

== Coat of arms ==
The blazon of the municipal coat of arms is Azure a Tower embattled Argent

== Demographics ==
Arconciel had a population (as of 2019) of 1,038. As of 2008, 9.2% of the population are resident foreign nationals. Over the last 10 years (2000–2010) the population has changed at a rate of 16.9%. Migration accounted for 8.5%, while births and deaths accounted for 7.8%.

Most of the population (as of 2000) speaks French (597 or 91.0%) as their first language, German is the second most common (41 or 6.3%) and Spanish is the third (4 or 0.6%). There are 2 people who speak Italian.

As of 2008, the population was 52.2% male and 47.8% female. The population was made up of 347 Swiss men (46.6% of the population) and 42 (5.6%) non-Swiss men. There were 329 Swiss women (44.2%) and 27 (3.6%) non-Swiss women. Of the population in the municipality, 222 or about 33.8% were born in Arconciel and lived there in 2000. There were 282 or 43.0% who were born in the same canton, while 82 or 12.5% were born somewhere else in Switzerland, and 51 or 7.8% were born outside of Switzerland.

As of 2000, children and teenagers (0–19 years old) make up 31.4% of the population, while adults (20–64 years old) make up 58.8% and seniors (over 64 years old) make up 9.8%.

As of 2000, there were 290 people who were single and never married in the municipality. There were 327 married individuals, 21 widows or widowers and 18 individuals who are divorced.

As of 2000, there were 227 private households in the municipality, and an average of 2.9 persons per household. There were 39 households that consist of only one person and 33 households with five or more people. In 2000, a total of 222 apartments (91.4% of the total) were permanently occupied, while 17 apartments (7.0%) were seasonally occupied and 4 apartments (1.6%) were empty. As of 2009, the construction rate of new housing units was 1.3 new units per 1000 residents. The vacancy rate for the municipality, in 2010, was 0.68%.

The historical population is given in the following chart:

== Heritage sites of national significance ==
The Farm House at La Souche 1, the Mesolithic shelter at La Souche and the medieval village at Vers-le-Château are listed as Swiss heritage site of national significance.

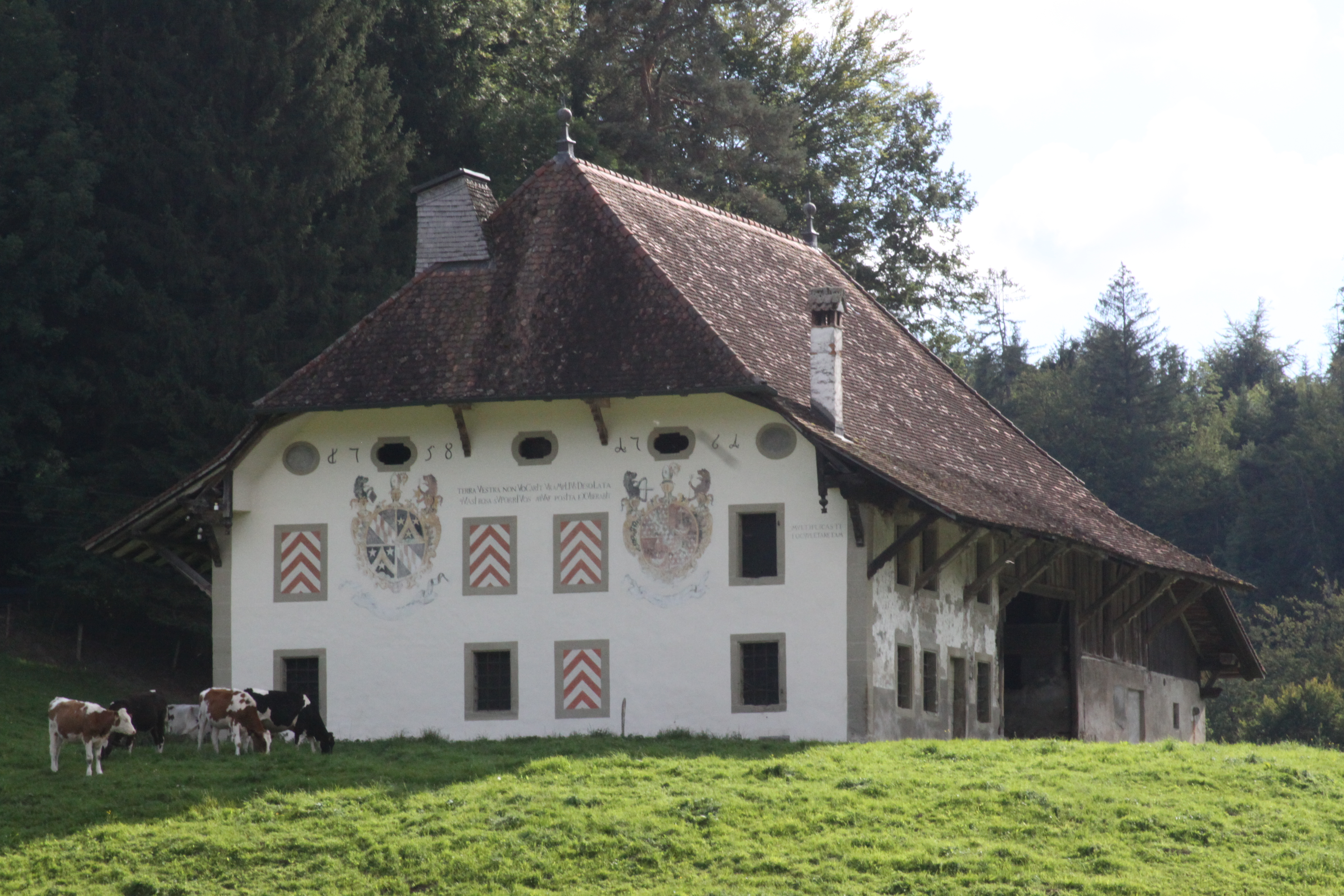
Farm House at La Souche 1

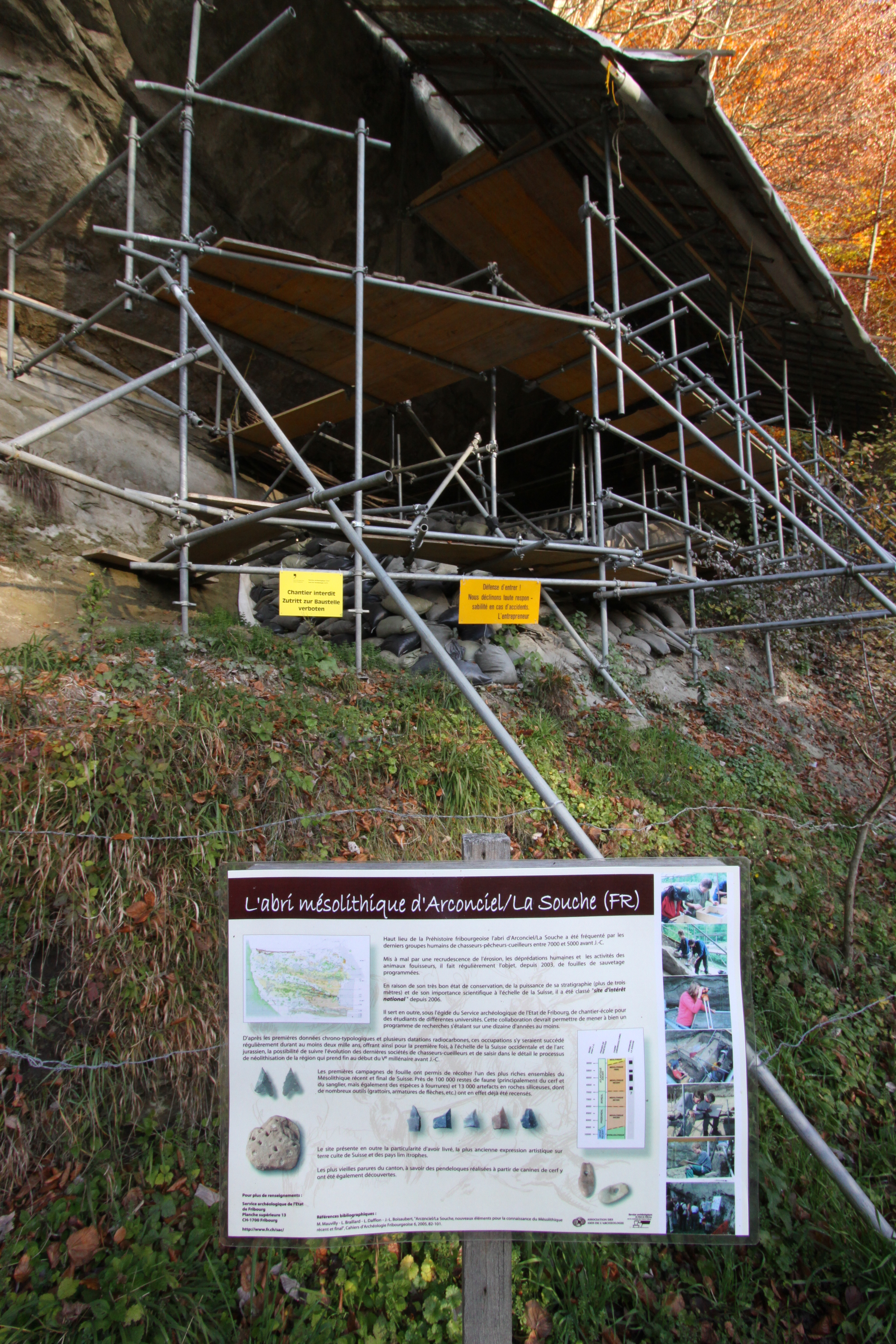
Mesolithic shelter at La Souche

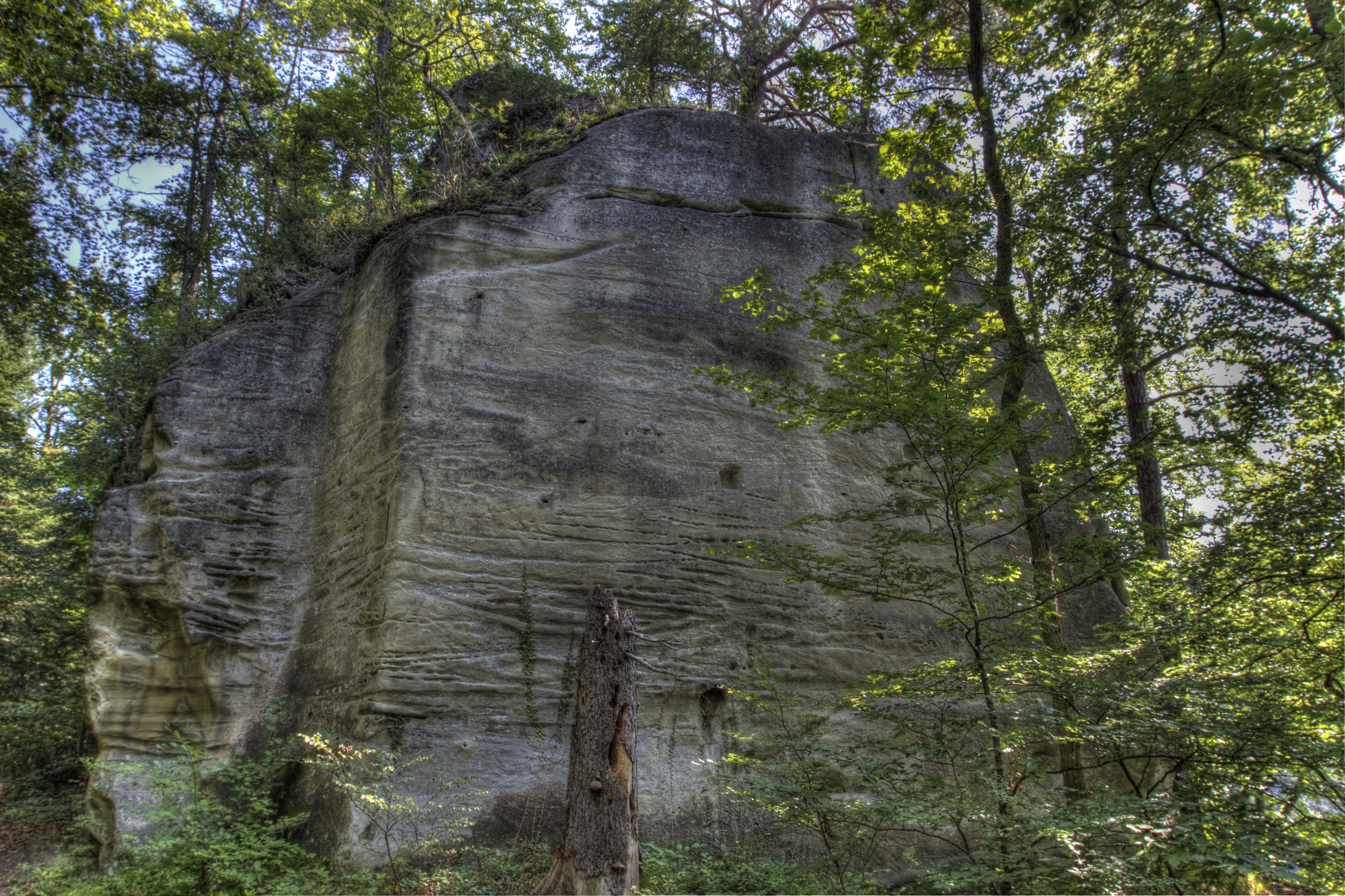
Medieval village at Vers-le-Château

== Politics ==
In the 2011 federal election the most popular party was the SP which received 35.7% of the vote. The next three most popular parties were the CVP (18.2%), the SVP (16.8%) and the FDP (9.8%).

The SPS received about the same percentage of the vote as they did in the 2007 Federal election (31.7% in 2007 vs 35.7% in 2011). The CVP lost popularity (24.9% in 2007), the SVP retained about the same popularity (14.8% in 2007) and the FDP moved from below fourth place in 2007 to fourth. A total of 254 votes were cast in this election, of which 3 or 1.2% were invalid.

== Economy ==
As of 2010, Arconciel had an unemployment rate of 3.4%. As of 2008, there were 20 people employed in the primary economic sector and about 9 businesses involved in this sector. 9 people were employed in the secondary sector and there were 2 businesses in this sector. 31 people were employed in the tertiary sector, with 9 businesses in this sector. There were 322 residents of the municipality who were employed in some capacity, of which females made up 40.7% of the workforce.

In 2008 the total number of full-time equivalent jobs was 45. The number of jobs in the primary sector was 15, all of which were in agriculture. The number of jobs in the secondary sector was 8, all of which were in manufacturing. The number of jobs in the tertiary sector was 22. In the tertiary sector; 4 or 18.2% were in a hotel or restaurant, 1 was the insurance or financial industry, 4 or 18.2% were technical professionals or scientists, 6 or 27.3% were in education.

In 2000, there were 16 workers who commuted into the municipality and 264 workers who commuted away. The municipality is a net exporter of workers, with about 16.5 workers leaving the municipality for every one entering. Of the working population, 7.1% used public transportation to get to work, and 78.9% used a private car.

== Religion ==
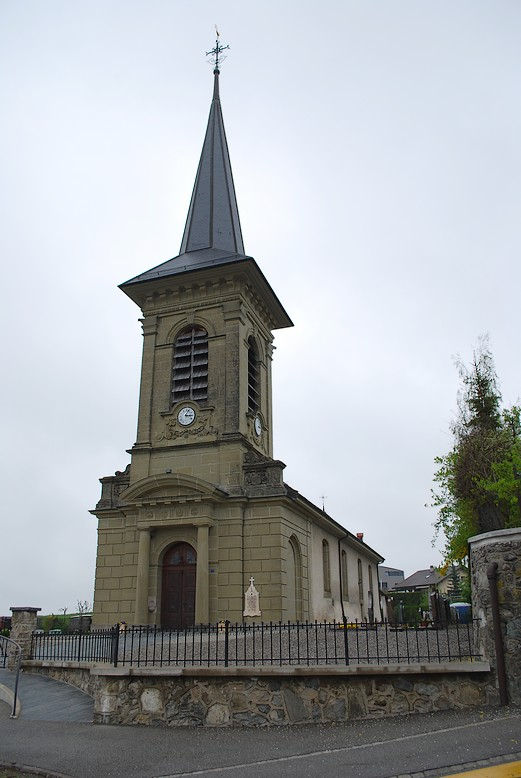
Catholic church of Arconciel

From the 2000 census, 540 or 82.3% were Roman Catholic, while 47 or 7.2% belonged to the Swiss Reformed Church. Of the rest of the population, there were 4 members of an Orthodox church (or about 0.61% of the population), and there were 7 individuals (or about 1.07% of the population) who belonged to another Christian church. There was 1 individual who was Jewish, and there was 1 individual who was Islamic. 42 (or about 6.40% of the population) belonged to no church, are agnostic or atheist, and 17 individuals (or about 2.59% of the population) did not answer the question.

== Education ==
In Arconciel about 206 or (31.4%) of the population have completed non-mandatory upper secondary education, and 102 or (15.5%) have completed additional higher education (either university or a Fachhochschule). Of the 102 who completed tertiary schooling, 65.7% were Swiss men, 25.5% were Swiss women, 5.9% were non-Swiss men.

The Canton of Fribourg school system provides one year of non-obligatory Kindergarten, followed by six years of Primary school. This is followed by three years of obligatory lower Secondary school where the students are separated according to ability and aptitude. Following the lower Secondary students may attend a three or four year optional upper Secondary school. The upper Secondary school is divided into gymnasium (university preparatory) and vocational programs. After they finish the upper Secondary program, students may choose to attend a Tertiary school or continue their apprenticeship.

During the 2010–11 school year, there were a total of 88 students attending 5 classes in Arconciel. A total of 162 students from the municipality attended any school, either in the municipality or outside of it. There was one kindergarten class with a total of 22 students in the municipality. The municipality had 4 primary classes and 66 students. During the same year, there were no lower secondary classes in the municipality, but 26 students attended lower secondary school in a neighboring municipality. There were no upper Secondary classes or vocational classes, but there were 25 upper Secondary students and 18 upper Secondary vocational students who attended classes in another municipality. The municipality had no non-university Tertiary classes, but there were 3 non-university Tertiary students and one specialized Tertiary student who attended classes in another municipality.

As of 2000, there were 9 students in Arconciel who came from another municipality, while 85 residents attended schools outside the municipality.
