= Sales, Sarine =

Coordinates: 46°45′35″N 7°9′13″E

Sales is a village and former municipality in the district of Sarine in the canton of Fribourg, Switzerland.

It was first recorded in 1082 as Sala.

The municipality had 114 inhabitants in 1811, which went up and down to 191 in 1850, 160 in 1870, 226 in 1920, 175 in 1930, 213 in 1941 and 153 in 1970.

In 1977 the municipality was incorporated into the larger, neighboring municipality Ependes.
