= Pont-la-Ville, Switzerland =

Pont-la-Ville
- Municipality
- Location of Pont-la-Ville
- Location within Switzerland Location within Canton of Fribourg
- Coordinates: 46°42′N 7°7′E
- Country: Switzerland
- Canton: Fribourg
- District: Gruyère

Government
  - Mayor: Syndic

Area
  - Total: 4.33 km^{2} (1.67 sq mi)
- Elevation: 746 m (2,448 ft)

Population (December 2020)
  - Total: 609
  - Density: 141/km^{2} (364/sq mi)
- Time zone: UTC+01:00 (CET)
  - Summer (DST): UTC+02:00 (CEST)
- Postal code: 1649
- SFOS number: 2147
- ISO 3166 code: CH-FR
- Surrounded by: Hauteville, La Roche, Pont-en-Ogoz, Rossens, Treyvaux
- Website: www.pont-la-ville.ch

Pont-la-Ville (French pronunciation: [pɔ̃ la vil]; Arpitan: Pont-la-Vela [ˈpɔ̃ na ˈvəla]) is a municipality in the district of Gruyère in the canton of Fribourg in Switzerland.

== History ==
Pont-la-Ville is first mentioned in 1228 as Pont la vila. The municipality was formerly known by its German name Ponnendorf, however, that name is no longer used.

== Geography ==
Pont-la-Ville has an area, as of 2009, of 4.3 square kilometers (1.7 mi^{2}). Of this area, 2.86 km^{2} (1.10 mi^{2}) or 66.2% is used for agricultural purposes, while 0.75 km^{2} (0.29 mi^{2}) or 17.4% is forested. Of the rest of the land, 0.69 km^{2} (0.27 mi^{2}) or 16.0% is settled (buildings or roads), 0.02 km^{2} (4.9 acres) or 0.5% is either rivers or lakes.

Of the built up area, housing and buildings made up 4.6% and transportation infrastructure made up 2.8%. while parks, green belts and sports fields made up 8.1%. Out of the forested land, all of the forested land area is covered with heavy forests. Of the agricultural land, 7.4% is used for growing crops and 57.9% is pastures. All the water in the municipality is in lakes.

The municipality is located in the Gruyère district, on the banks of the Saane/Sarine river and the Lake of Gruyère.

Aerial view (1963)

== Coat of arms ==
The blazon of the municipal coat of arms is Gules, a Bridge masoned Argent issuant from water proper.

== Demographics ==
Pont-la-Ville has a population (as of December 2020) of 609. As of 2008, 8.5% of the population are resident foreign nationals. Over the last 10 years (2000–2010) the population has changed at a rate of 24.3%. Migration accounted for 16.3%, while births and deaths accounted for 10%.

Most of the population (as of 2000) speaks French (424 or 92.4%) as their first language, German is the second most common (21 or 4.6%) and Portuguese is the third (4 or 0.9%). There are 3 people who speak Italian.

As of 2008, the population was 50.3% male and 49.7% female. The population was made up of 262 Swiss men (45.7% of the population) and 26 (4.5%) non-Swiss men. There were 261 Swiss women (45.5%) and 24 (4.2%) non-Swiss women. Of the population in the municipality, 212 or about 46.2% were born in Pont-la-Ville and lived there in 2000. There were 147 or 32.0% who were born in the same canton, while 57 or 12.4% were born somewhere else in Switzerland, and 27 or 5.9% were born outside of Switzerland.

As of 2000, children and teenagers (0–19 years old) make up 28.8% of the population, while adults (20–64 years old) make up 59.7% and seniors (over 64 years old) make up 11.5%.

As of 2000, there were 190 people who were single and never married in the municipality. There were 229 married individuals, 16 widows or widowers and 24 individuals who are divorced.

As of 2000, there were 165 private households in the municipality, and an average of 2.7 persons per household. There were 34 households that consist of only one person and 12 households with five or more people. In 2000, a total of 159 apartments (76.8% of the total) were permanently occupied, while 37 apartments (17.9%) were seasonally occupied and 11 apartments (5.3%) were empty. As of 2009, the construction rate of new housing units was 1.7 new units per 1000 residents. The vacancy rate for the municipality, in 2010, was 0.42%.

The historical population is given in the following chart:

== Politics ==
In the 2011 federal election the most popular party was the CVP which received 36.6% of the vote. The next three most popular parties were the SP (20.8%), the SVP (20.3%) and the FDP (9.1%).

The CVP lost about 5.0% of the vote when compared to the 2007 Federal election (41.6% in 2007 vs 36.6% in 2011). The SPS moved from third in 2007 (with 16.9%) to second in 2011, the SVP moved from second in 2007 (with 22.0%) to third and the FDP retained about the same popularity (11.0% in 2007). A total of 199 votes were cast in this election, of which 7 or 3.5% were invalid.

== Economy ==
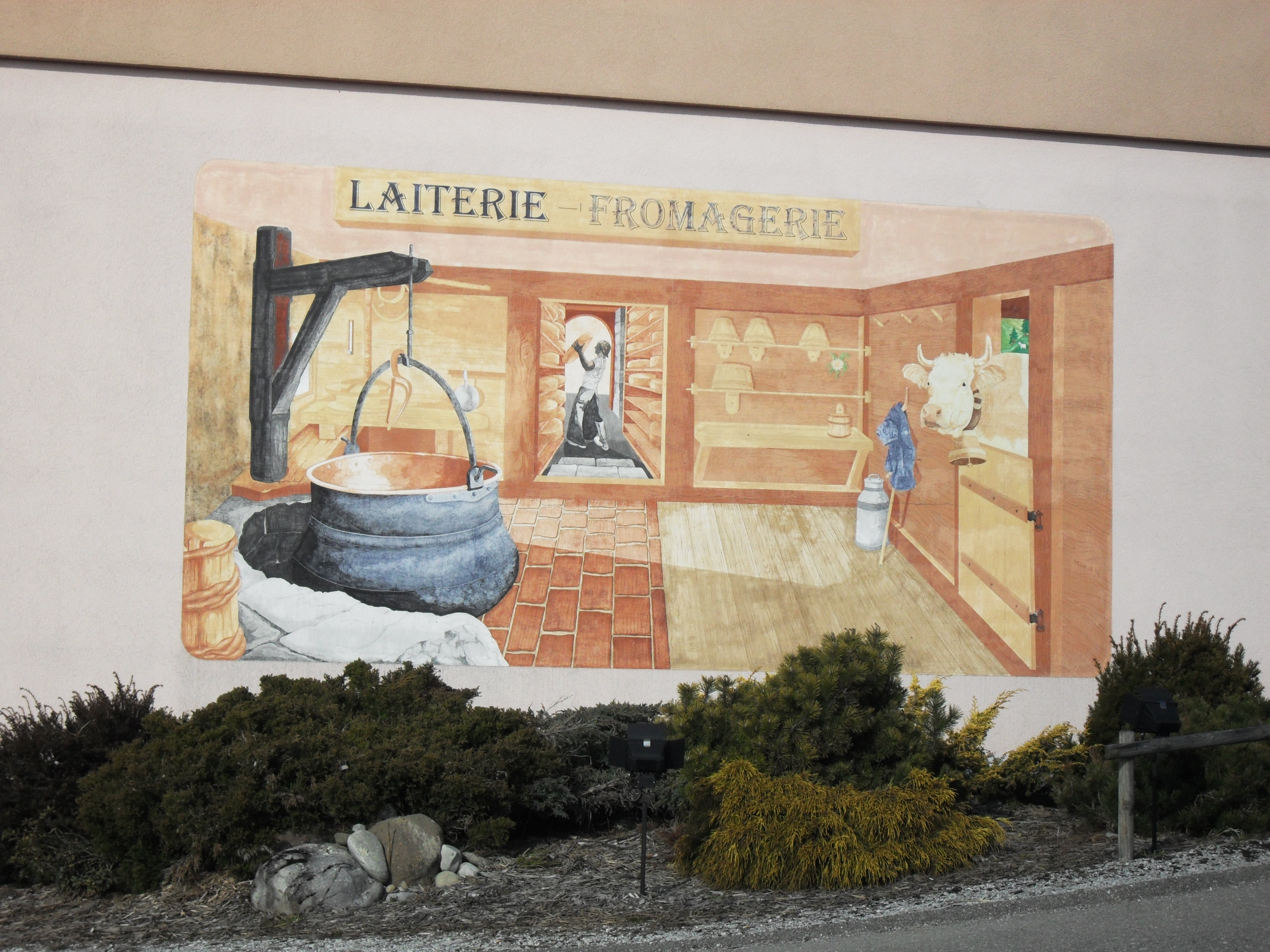
Mural on the wall of a shop in Pont-la-Ville

As of 2010, Pont-la-Ville had an unemployment rate of 2.8%. As of 2008, there were 35 people employed in the primary economic sector and about 14 businesses involved in this sector. 5 people were employed in the secondary sector and there were 2 businesses in this sector. 29 people were employed in the tertiary sector, with 7 businesses in this sector. There were 238 residents of the municipality who were employed in some capacity, of which females made up 39.9% of the workforce.

In 2008 the total number of full-time equivalent jobs was 56. The number of jobs in the primary sector was 26, all of which were in agriculture. The number of jobs in the secondary sector was 5, all of which were in manufacturing. The number of jobs in the tertiary sector was 25. In the tertiary sector; 2 or 8.0% were in wholesale or retail sales or the repair of motor vehicles, 17 or 68.0% were in a hotel or restaurant, 1 was in the information industry, 4 or 16.0% were in education.

In 2000, there were 9 workers who commuted into the municipality and 163 workers who commuted away. The municipality is a net exporter of workers, with about 18.1 workers leaving the municipality for every one entering. Of the working population, 6.3% used public transportation to get to work, and 63% used a private car.

== Religion ==
From the 2000 census, 400 or 87.1% were Roman Catholic, while 14 or 3.1% belonged to the Swiss Reformed Church. Of the rest of the population, there were 2 members of an Orthodox church (or about 0.44% of the population), and there were 8 individuals (or about 1.74% of the population) who belonged to another Christian church. There was 1 individual who was Islamic. There were 2 individuals who were Buddhist and 1 individual who belonged to another church. 17 (or about 3.70% of the population) belonged to no church, are agnostic or atheist, and 18 individuals (or about 3.92% of the population) did not answer the question.

== Education ==
In Pont-la-Ville about 132 or (28.8%) of the population have completed non-mandatory upper secondary education, and 57 or (12.4%) have completed additional higher education (either university or a Fachhochschule). Of the 57 who completed tertiary schooling, 57.9% were Swiss men, 26.3% were Swiss women and 8.8% were non-Swiss women.

The Canton of Fribourg school system provides one year of non-obligatory Kindergarten, followed by six years of Primary school. This is followed by three years of obligatory lower Secondary school where the students are separated according to ability and aptitude. Following the lower Secondary students may attend a three or four year optional upper Secondary school. The upper Secondary school is divided into gymnasium (university preparatory) and vocational programs. After they finish the upper Secondary program, students may choose to attend a Tertiary school or continue their apprenticeship.

During the 2010-11 school year, there were a total of 56 students attending 3 classes in Pont-la-Ville. A total of 120 students from the municipality attended any school, either in the municipality or outside of it. There were no kindergarten classes in the municipality, but 5 students attended kindergarten in a neighboring municipality. The municipality had 3 primary classes and 56 students. During the same year, there were no lower secondary classes in the municipality, but 21 students attended lower secondary school in a neighboring municipality. There were no upper Secondary classes or vocational classes, but there were 10 upper Secondary students and 28 upper Secondary vocational students who attended classes in another municipality. The municipality had no non-university Tertiary classes, but there was one non-university Tertiary student who attended classes in another municipality.

As of 2000, there were 19 students in Pont-la-Ville who came from another municipality, while 48 residents attended schools outside the municipality.
