= Ferpicloz =

- Municipality
- Flag Coat of arms
- Location of Ferpicloz
- Location within Switzerland Location within Canton of Fribourg
- Coordinates: 46°45′N 7°10′E
- Country: Switzerland
- Canton: Fribourg
- District: Sarine

Government
  - Mayor: Syndic

Area
  - Total: 1.03 km^{2} (0.40 sq mi)
- Elevation: 767 m (2,516 ft)

Population (December 2020)
  - Total: 267
  - Density: 259/km^{2} (671/sq mi)
- Time zone: UTC+01:00 (CET)
  - Summer (DST): UTC+02:00 (CEST)
- Postal code: 1724
- SFOS number: 2194
- ISO 3166 code: CH-FR
- Surrounded by: Ependes, Le Mouret, Senèdes
- Website: ferpicloz.ch

Ferpicloz (Arpitan: Fèrpicllo [fɛʁˈpiço]) is a municipality in the district of Sarine in the canton of Fribourg in Switzerland.

== History ==
Ferpicloz is first mentioned in 1270 as Ferpecles. The municipality was formerly known by its German name Pichlen; however, that name is no longer used.

== Geography ==
Ferpicloz has an area, as of 2009, of 1 square kilometer (0.39 mi^{2}). Of this area, 0.71 km^{2} (0.27 mi^{2}) or 70.3% is used for agricultural purposes, while 0.15 km^{2} (0.058 mi^{2}) or 14.9% is forested. Of the rest of the land, 0.17 km^{2} (0.066 mi^{2}) or 16.8% is settled (buildings or roads).

Of the built up area, industrial buildings made up 2.0% of the total area while housing and buildings made up 6.9% and transportation infrastructure made up 7.9%. Out of the forested land, all of the forested land area is covered with heavy forests. Of the agricultural land, 24.8% is used for growing crops and 44.6% is pastures.

The municipality is located in the Sarine district. This small municipality lies on the Fribourg-Bulle road and includes part of the hamlet of Le Mouret.

== Coat of arms ==
The blazon of the municipal coat of arms is Per saltire Argent and Gules overall a fleur-de-lys counterchanged.

== Demographics ==
Ferpicloz has a population (as of December 2020) of 267. As of 2008, 8.0% of the population are resident foreign nationals. Over the last 10 years (2000–2010) the population has changed at a rate of 33.1%. Migration accounted for 30.9%, while births and deaths accounted for 3.3%.

Most of the population (as of 2000) speaks French (157 or 85.8%) as their first language, German is the second most common (22 or 12.0%) and Russisch is the third (1 or 0.5%).

As of 2008, the population was 49.6% male and 50.4% female. The population was made up of 109 Swiss men (46.2% of the population) and 8 (3.4%) non-Swiss men. There were 109 Swiss women (46.2%) and 10 (4.2%) non-Swiss women. Of the population in the municipality, 41 or about 22.4% were born in Ferpicloz and lived there in 2000. There were 73 or 39.9% who were born in the same canton, while 44 or 24.0% were born somewhere else in Switzerland, and 18 or 9.8% were born outside of Switzerland.

As of 2000, children and teenagers (0–19 years old) make up 23.5% of the population, while adults (20–64 years old) make up 60.7% and seniors (over 64 years old) make up 15.8%.

As of 2000, there were 67 people who were single and never married in the municipality. There were 104 married individuals, 8 widows or widowers and 4 individuals who are divorced.

As of 2000, there were 66 private households in the municipality, and an average of 2.7 persons per household. There were 12 households that consist of only one person and 10 households with five or more people. In 2000, a total of 64 apartments (85.3% of the total) were permanently occupied, while 3 apartments (4.0%) were seasonally occupied and 8 apartments (10.7%) were empty. As of 2009, the construction rate of new housing units was 8.3 new units per 1000 residents. The vacancy rate for the municipality, in 2010, was 1.08%.

The historical population is given in the following chart:

== Politics ==
In the 2011 federal election the most popular party was the SVP which received 41.7% of the vote. The next three most popular parties were the SPS (19.9%), the FDP (11.2%) and the CVP (9.8%).

The SVP received about the same percentage of the vote as they did in the 2007 Federal election (37.4% in 2007 vs 41.7% in 2011). The SPS moved from fourth in 2007 (with 9.4%) to second in 2011, the FDP lost popularity (19.0% in 2007) and the CVP moved from second in 2007 (with 24.6%) to fourth. A total of 86 votes were cast in this election.

== Economy ==
As of 2010, Ferpicloz had an unemployment rate of 0.8%. As of 2008, there were 5 people employed in the primary economic sector and about 3 businesses involved in this sector. 30 people were employed in the secondary sector and there were 6 businesses in this sector. 33 people were employed in the tertiary sector, with 10 businesses in this sector. There were 98 residents of the municipality who were employed in some capacity, of which females made up 44.9% of the workforce.

In 2008 the total number of full-time equivalent jobs was 45. The number of jobs in the primary sector was 3, all of which were in agriculture. The number of jobs in the secondary sector was 23 of which 21 or (91.3%) were in manufacturing and 2 (8.7%) were in construction. The number of jobs in the tertiary sector was 19. In the tertiary sector; 8 or 42.1% were in wholesale or retail sales or the repair of motor vehicles, 1 was in the movement and storage of goods, 6 or 31.6% were in a hotel or restaurant, 1 was the insurance or financial industry, 3 or 15.8% were technical professionals or scientists.

In 2000, there were 22 workers who commuted into the municipality and 65 workers who commuted away. The municipality is a net exporter of workers, with about 3.0 workers leaving the municipality for every one entering. Of the working population, 8.2% used public transportation to get to work, and 71.4% used a private car.

== Religion ==
From the 2000 census, 157 or 85.8% were Roman Catholic, while 11 or 6.0% belonged to the Swiss Reformed Church. Of the rest of the population, there were 2 members of an Orthodox church (or about 1.09% of the population), and there were 4 individuals (or about 2.19% of the population) who belonged to another Christian church. There was 1 individual who was Islamic. 6 (or about 3.28% of the population) belonged to no church, are agnostic or atheist, and 4 individuals (or about 2.19% of the population) did not answer the question.

== Education ==
In Ferpicloz about 59 or (32.2%) of the population have completed non-mandatory upper secondary education, and 32 or (17.5%) have completed additional higher education (either university or a Fachhochschule). Of the 32 who completed tertiary schooling, 68.8% were Swiss men, 21.9% were Swiss women.

The Canton of Fribourg school system provides one year of non-obligatory Kindergarten, followed by six years of Primary school. This is followed by three years of obligatory lower Secondary school where the students are separated according to ability and aptitude. Following the lower Secondary students may attend a three or four year optional upper Secondary school. The upper Secondary school is divided into gymnasium (university preparatory) and vocational programs. After they finish the upper Secondary program, students may choose to attend a Tertiary school or continue their apprenticeship.

During the 2010–11 school year, there were no students attending school in Ferpicloz, but a total of 45 students attended school in other municipalities. Of these students, 5 were in kindergarten, 15 were in a primary school, 9 were in a mandatory secondary school, 9 were in an upper secondary school and 6 were in a vocational secondary program. There was one tertiary student from the municipality.

As of 2000, there were 2 students in Ferpicloz who came from another municipality, while 34 residents attended schools outside the municipality.
