= Illens Castle =

Castle in Rossens, Switzerland

- Rossens
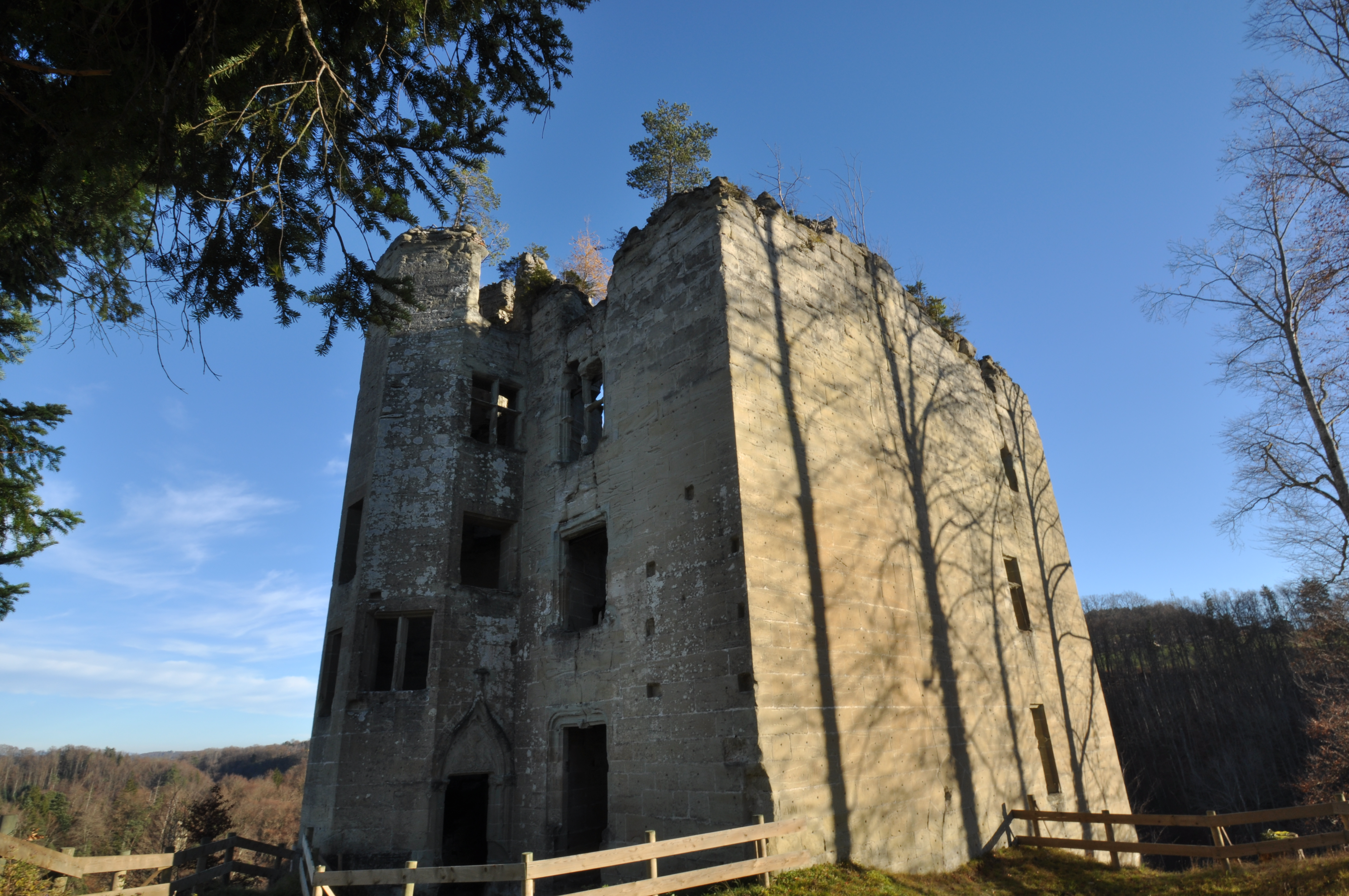
- Illens Castle

Site information
- Code: CH-FR
- Condition: Ruined castle

Location
- Coordinates: 46°44′19″N 7°06′38″E

Site history
- Built: 1150-1276

Illens Castle is a castle in the municipality of Rossens of the Canton of Fribourg in Switzerland. It is a Swiss heritage site of national significance.

== See also ==
- List of castles in Switzerland
- Château
