= Marly, Fribourg =

Marly
- Municipality
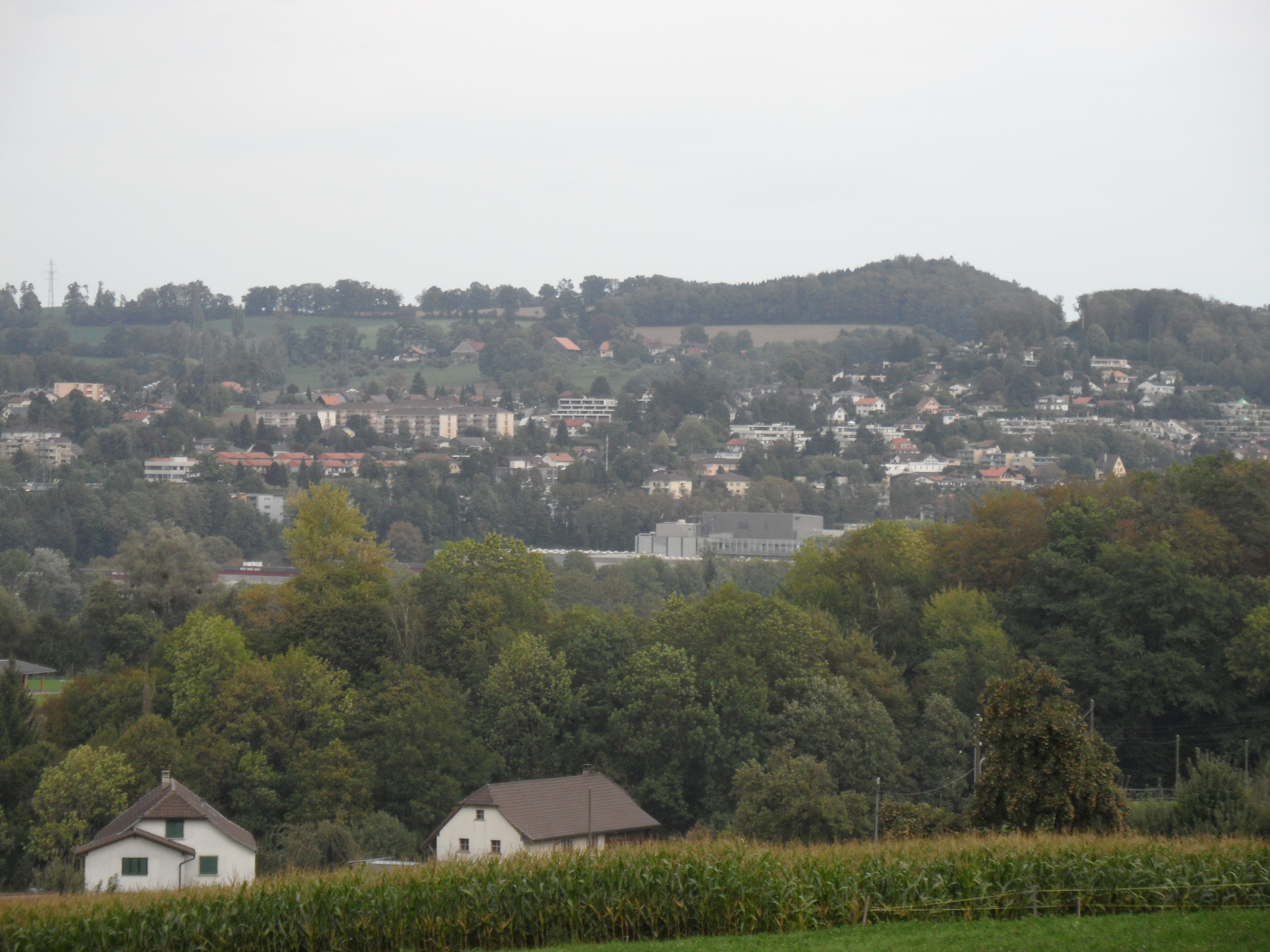
- Marly village

- Flag Coat of arms
- Location of Marly
- Location within Switzerland Location within Canton of Fribourg
- Coordinates: 46°47′N 7°10′E
- Country: Switzerland
- Canton: Fribourg
- District: Sarine

Government
  - Mayor: Syndic

Area
  - Total: 7.68 km^{2} (2.97 sq mi)
- Elevation: 627 m (2,057 ft)

Population (December 2020)
  - Total: 8,222
  - Density: 1,070/km^{2} (2,770/sq mi)
- Time zone: UTC+01:00 (CET)
  - Summer (DST): UTC+02:00 (CEST)
- Postal code: 1723
- SFOS number: 2206
- ISO 3166 code: CH-FR
- Surrounded by: Arconciel, Ependes, Fribourg (Fribourg/Freiburg im Üechtland), Hauterive, Pierrafortscha, Villarsel-sur-Marly, Villars-sur-Glâne
- Website: www.marly.ch

Marly (French: [maʁli]; Arpitan: Marli [maʁˈli]) is a municipality in the district of Sarine in the canton of Fribourg in Switzerland. Its German name is Mertenlach, but this is no longer common, although still in regional use. It was formed through the 1970 merger of Marly-le-Grand and Marly-le-Petit and the 1976 addition of the former municipality of Chésalles.

== History ==
Marly is first mentioned in 1055 as in marlensi.

== Geography ==
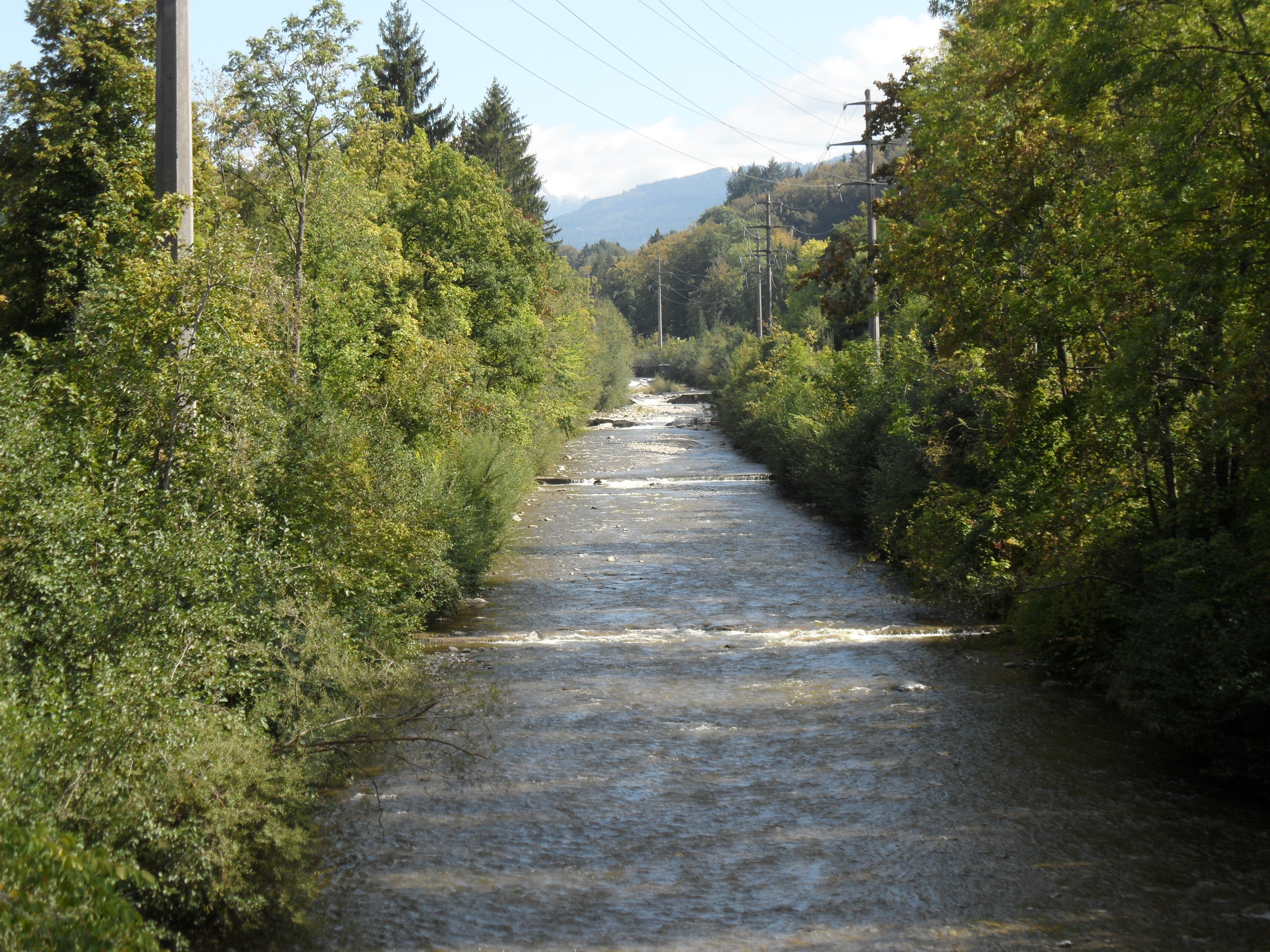
Gérine river in Marly

Marly has an area, as of 2009, of 7.7 square kilometers (3.0 mi^{2}). Of this area, 2.71 km^{2} (1.05 mi^{2}) or 35.2% is used for agricultural purposes, while 2.26 km^{2} (0.87 mi^{2}) or 29.4% is forested. Of the rest of the land, 2.37 km^{2} (0.92 mi^{2}) or 30.8% is settled (buildings or roads), 0.33 km^{2} (0.13 mi^{2}) or 4.3% is either rivers or lakes and 0.01 km^{2} (2.5 acres) or 0.1% is unproductive land.

Of the built up area, industrial buildings made up 4.2% of the total area while housing and buildings made up 17.1% and transportation infrastructure made up 6.4%. Power and water infrastructure as well as other special developed areas made up 1.3% of the area while parks, green belts and sports fields made up 1.8%. Out of the forested land, 27.5% of the total land area is heavily forested and 1.8% is covered with orchards or small clusters of trees. Of the agricultural land, 19.2% is used for growing crops and 15.8% is pastures. All the water in the municipality is flowing water.

The municipality is located in the Sarine district, 5 km (3.1 mi) south of Fribourg on the Gérine river. It is an industrial town and regional center. It consists of the villages of Marly-le Grand, Marly-le Petit and Chésalles.

Aerial view (1971)

== Coat of arms ==
The blazon of the municipal coat of arms is Gules a bar wavy Azure and overall a Knight statant armoured Argent holding a Pike in dexter and a Sword seafed on a Belt in sinister and in chief sinister three alder-tree leaves Or slipped conjoined. The coat of arms was changed in 1991 to reflect the earlier mergers that formed Marly. The blue wavy stripe symbolizes the river Gerine.

== Demographics ==
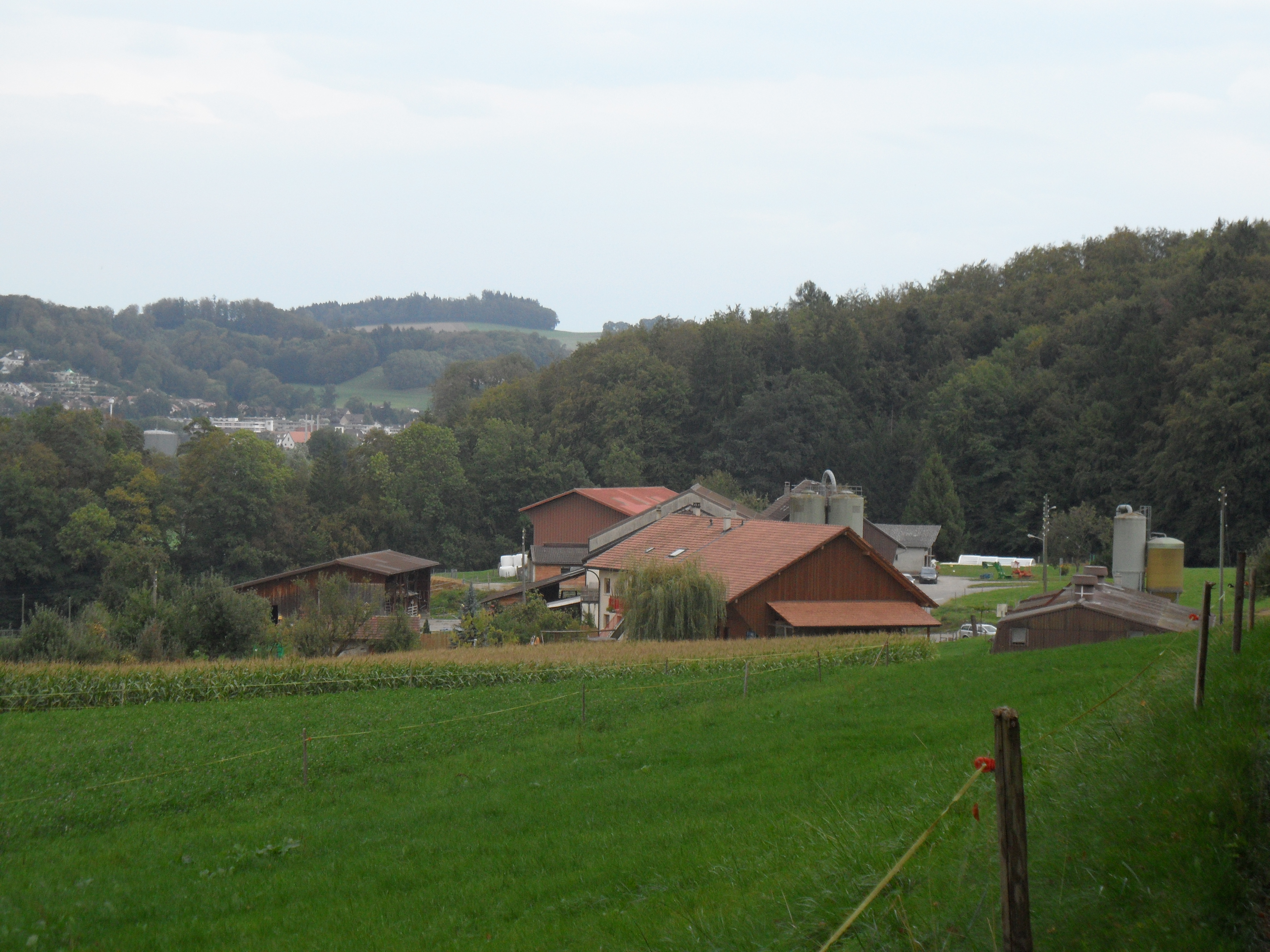
Chésales village

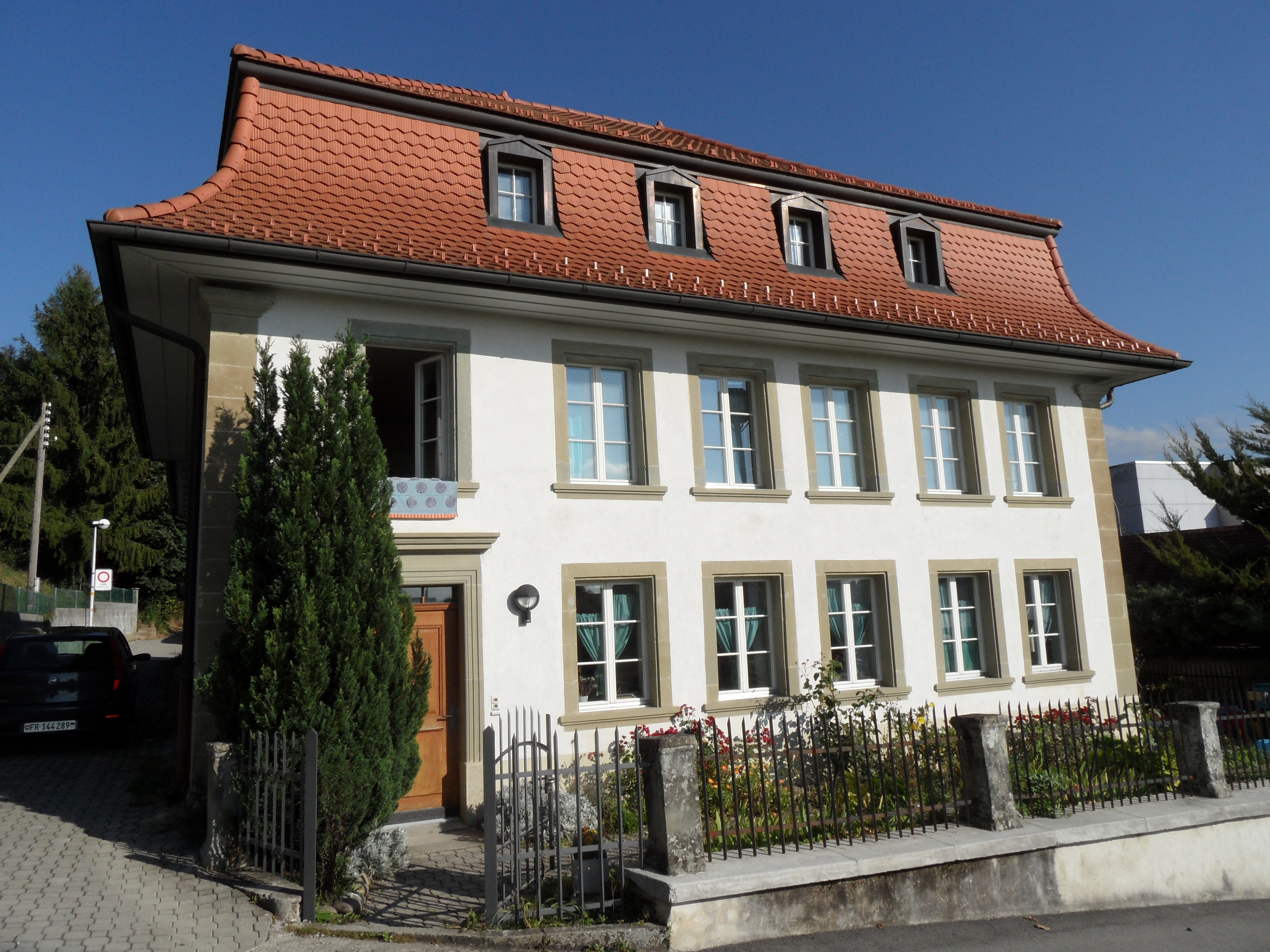
House in Marly

Marly has a population (as of December 2020) of 8,222. As of 2008, 22.5% of the population are resident foreign nationals. Over the last 10 years (2000–2010) the population has changed at a rate of 12.4%. Migration accounted for 3.3%, while births and deaths accounted for 6.1%.

Most of the population (as of 2000) speaks French (5,262 or 73.2%) as their first language, German is the second most common (1,243 or 17.3%) and Italian is the third (151 or 2.1%). There are 10 people who speak Romansh.

As of 2008, the population was 48.8% male and 51.2% female. The population was made up of 2,783 Swiss men (36.3% of the population) and 960 (12.5%) non-Swiss men. There were 3,086 Swiss women (40.2%) and 846 (11.0%) non-Swiss women. Of the population in the municipality, 1,647 or about 22.9% were born in Marly and lived there in 2000. There were 2,641 or 36.8% who were born in the same canton, while 1,298 or 18.1% were born somewhere else in Switzerland, and 1,398 or 19.5% were born outside of Switzerland.

As of 2000, children and teenagers (0–19 years old) make up 25.1% of the population, while adults (20–64 years old) make up 64.4% and seniors (over 64 years old) make up 10.5%.

As of 2000, there were 3,133 people who were single and never married in the municipality. There were 3,402 married individuals, 293 widows or widowers and 356 individuals who are divorced.

As of 2000, there were 2,801 private households in the municipality, and an average of 2.5 persons per household. There were 808 households that consist of only one person and 219 households with five or more people. In 2000, a total of 2,747 apartments (90.8% of the total) were permanently occupied, while 203 apartments (6.7%) were seasonally occupied and 75 apartments (2.5%) were empty. As of 2009, the construction rate of new housing units was 1.7 new units per 1000 residents. The vacancy rate for the municipality, in 2010, was 1.3%.

The historical population is given in the following chart:

== Politics ==
In the 2011 federal election the most popular party was the SPS which received 33.1% of the vote. The next three most popular parties were the SVP (19.1%), the CVP (17.6%) and the FDP (8.9%).

The SPS improved their position in Marly rising to first, from second in 2007 (with 26.6%) The SVP moved from third in 2007 (with 18.8%) to second in 2011, the CVP moved from first in 2007 (with 27.0%) to third and the FDP retained about the same popularity (9.6% in 2007). A total of 2,329 votes were cast in this election, of which 30 or 1.3% were invalid.

== Economy ==
As of 2010, Marly had an unemployment rate of 4%. As of 2008, there were 24 people employed in the primary economic sector and about 11 businesses involved in this sector. 727 people were employed in the secondary sector and there were 47 businesses in this sector. 1,429 people were employed in the tertiary sector, with 183 businesses in this sector. There were 3,601 residents of the municipality who were employed in some capacity, of which females made up 45.5% of the workforce.

In 2008 the total number of full-time equivalent jobs was 1,812. The number of jobs in the primary sector was 19, all of which were in agriculture. The number of jobs in the secondary sector was 689 of which 488 or (70.8%) were in manufacturing and 195 (28.3%) were in construction. The number of jobs in the tertiary sector was 1,104. In the tertiary sector; 427 or 38.7% were in wholesale or retail sales or the repair of motor vehicles, 36 or 3.3% were in the movement and storage of goods, 65 or 5.9% were in a hotel or restaurant, 3 or 0.3% were in the information industry, 51 or 4.6% were the insurance or financial industry, 116 or 10.5% were technical professionals or scientists, 98 or 8.9% were in education and 195 or 17.7% were in health care.

In 2000, there were 1,560 workers who commuted into the municipality and 2,619 workers who commuted away. The municipality is a net exporter of workers, with about 1.7 workers leaving the municipality for every one entering. Of the working population, 19.5% used public transportation to get to work, and 62.8% used a private car.

== Religion ==
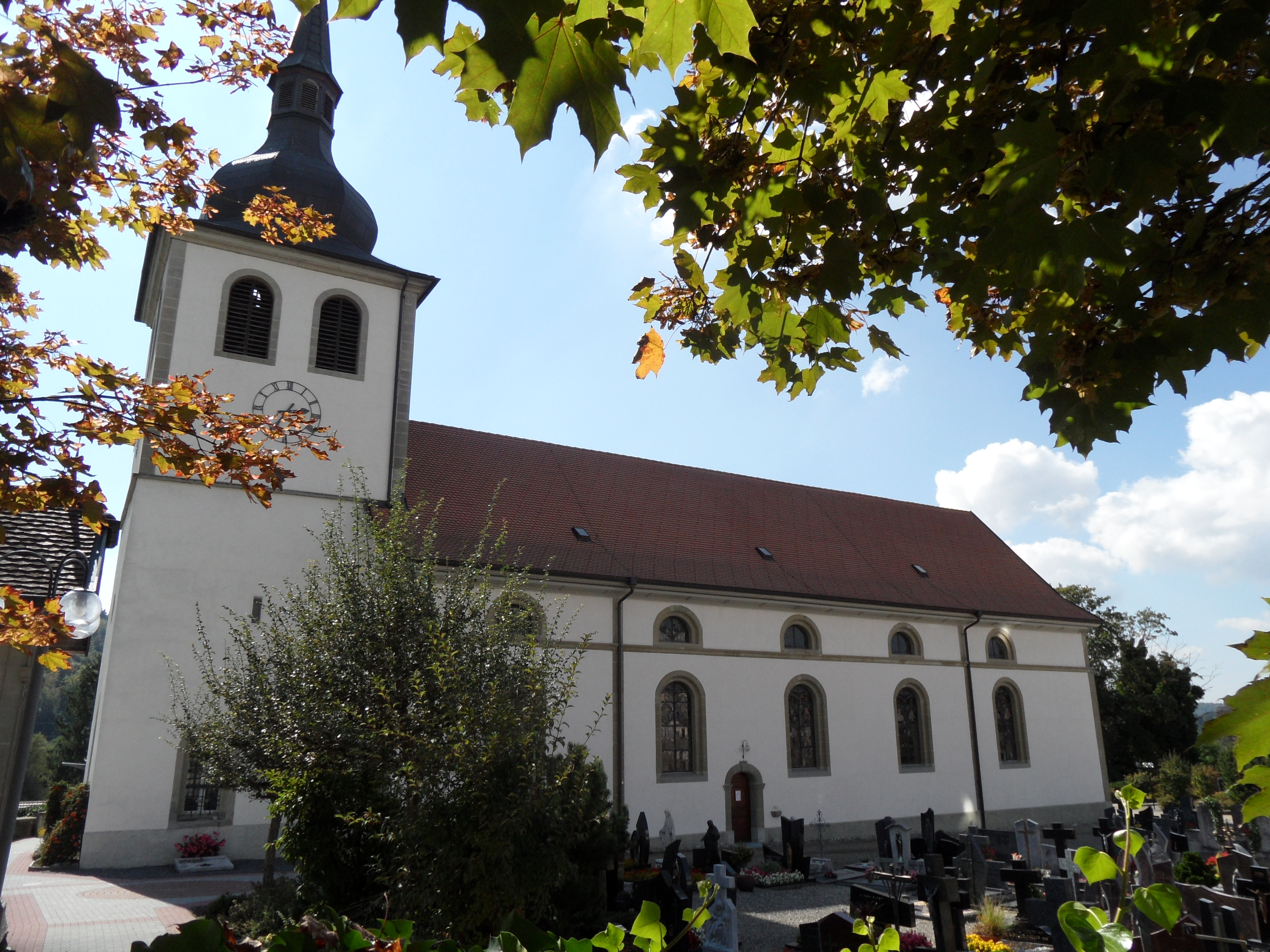
Church in Marly

From the 2000 census, 5,289 or 73.6% were Roman Catholic, while 645 or 9.0% belonged to the Swiss Reformed Church. Of the rest of the population, there were 97 members of an Orthodox church (or about 1.35% of the population), there were 6 individuals (or about 0.08% of the population) who belonged to the Christian Catholic Church, and there were 96 individuals (or about 1.34% of the population) who belonged to another Christian church. There were 10 individuals (or about 0.14% of the population) who were Jewish, and 273 (or about 3.80% of the population) who were Islamic. There were 29 individuals who were Buddhist, 11 individuals who were Hindu and 5 individuals who belonged to another church. 502 (or about 6.99% of the population) belonged to no church, are agnostic or atheist, and 264 individuals (or about 3.67% of the population) did not answer the question.

== Education ==
In Marly about 2,341 or (32.6%) of the population have completed non-mandatory upper secondary education, and 1,223 or (17.0%) have completed additional higher education (either university or a Fachhochschule). Of the 1,223 who completed tertiary schooling, 56.8% were Swiss men, 25.9% were Swiss women, 10.2% were non-Swiss men and 7.0% were non-Swiss women.

The Canton of Fribourg school system provides one year of non-obligatory Kindergarten, followed by six years of Primary school. This is followed by three years of obligatory lower Secondary school where the students are separated according to ability and aptitude. Following the lower Secondary students may attend a three or four-year optional upper Secondary school. The upper Secondary school is divided into gymnasium (university preparatory) and vocational programs. After they finish the upper Secondary program, students may choose to attend a Tertiary school or continue their apprenticeship.

During the 2010–11 school year, there were a total of 1,096 students attending 56 classes in Marly. A total of 1,335 students from the municipality attended any school, either in the municipality or outside of it. There were 4 kindergarten classes with a total of 68 students in the municipality. The municipality had 24 primary classes and 448 students. During the same year, there were 27 lower secondary classes with a total of 570 students. There were no upper Secondary classes or vocational classes, but there were 216 upper Secondary students and 183 upper Secondary vocational students who attended classes in another municipality. The municipality had one special Tertiary class, with 10 specialized Tertiary students.

As of 2000, there were 299 students in Marly who came from another municipality, while 716 residents attended schools outside the municipality.
