= Treyvaux =

- Municipality
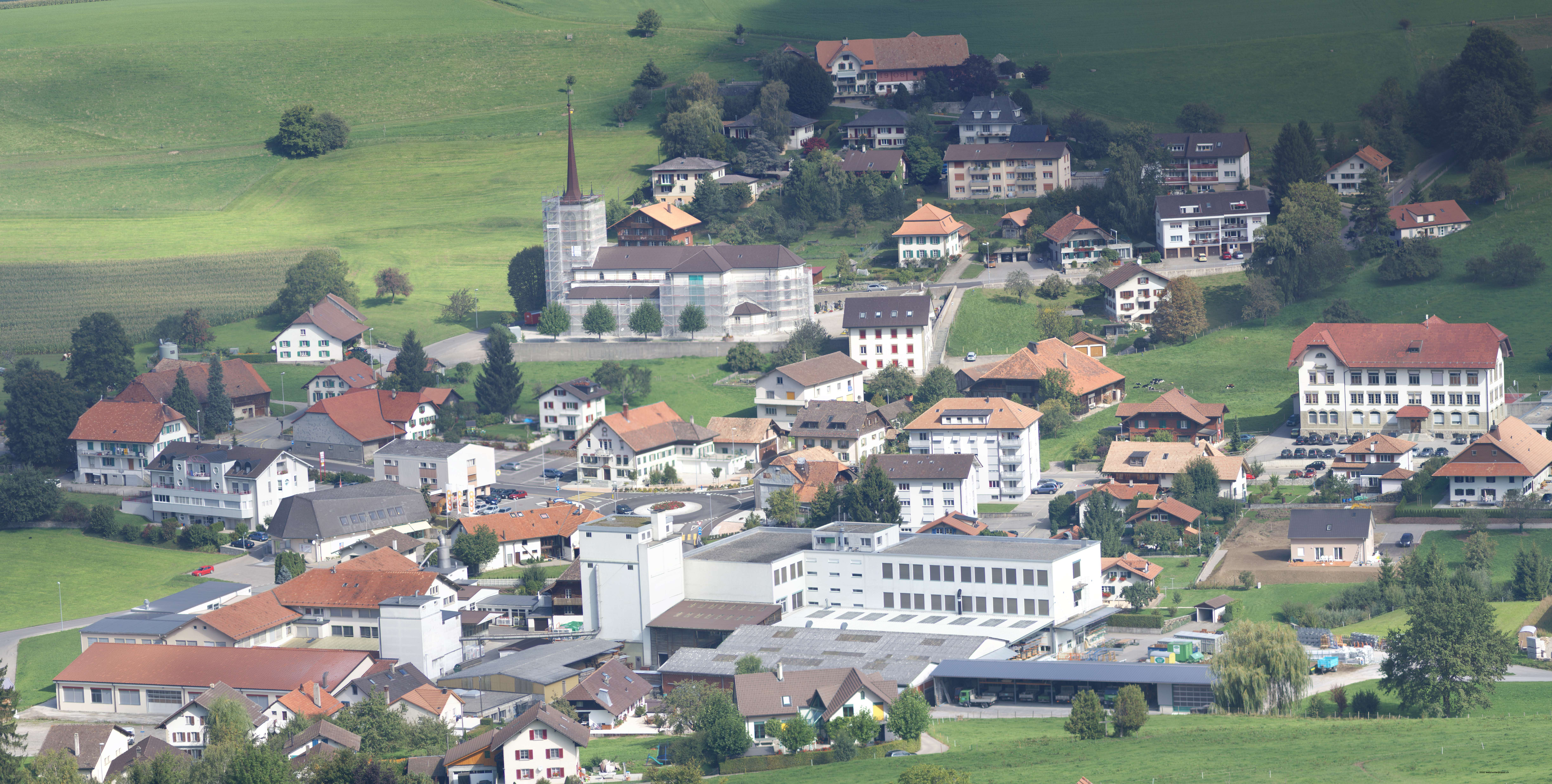
- View of center Treyvaux

- Coat of arms
- Location of Treyvaux
- Location within Switzerland Location within Canton of Fribourg
- Coordinates: 46°44′N 7°8′E
- Country: Switzerland
- Canton: Fribourg
- District: Sarine

Government
  - Mayor: Syndic

Area
  - Total: 11.42 km^{2} (4.41 sq mi)
- Elevation: 770 m (2,530 ft)

Population (December 2020)
  - Total: 1,466
  - Density: 128.4/km^{2} (332.5/sq mi)
- Time zone: UTC+01:00 (CET)
  - Summer (DST): UTC+02:00 (CEST)
- Postal code: 1733
- SFOS number: 2226
- ISO 3166 code: CH-FR
- Surrounded by: Arconciel, La Roche, Le Mouret, Pont-la-Ville, Rossens, Senèdes
- Website: www.treyvaux.ch

Treyvaux (French: [tʁɛːvo]; Arpitan: Trèvâlx [tʁiˈvo]) is a municipality and a village in the district of Sarine in the canton of Fribourg in Switzerland.

== History ==
Treyvaux is first mentioned around 1163-66 as Tribus Vallibus ("Of Three Valleys"). Over the time it was known under numerous variations of the Latin name: Tresvaux, Trevaux, Tresvals, Trevauz, Trevoul, Treyvaul, Treyvas, Trevas, Trefels.

== Geography ==
Treyvaux has an area, as of 2009, of 11.4 square kilometers (4.4 mi^{2}). Of this area, 7.25 km^{2} (2.80 mi^{2}) or 63.4% is used for agricultural purposes, while 3.38 km^{2} (1.31 mi^{2}) or 29.5% is forested. Of the rest of the land, 0.71 km^{2} (0.27 mi^{2}) or 6.2% is settled (buildings or roads), 0.07 km^{2} (17 acres) or 0.6% is either rivers or lakes and 0.01 km^{2} (2.5 acres) or 0.1% is unproductive land.

Of the built up area, housing and buildings made up 3.4% and transportation infrastructure made up 1.9%. Out of the forested land, all of the forested land area is covered with heavy forests. Of the agricultural land, 21.7% is used for growing crops and 40.5% is pastures. All the water in the municipality is flowing water.

The municipality is located in the Sarine district, on the right bank of the Sarine.

== Coat of arms ==
The blazon of the municipal coat of arms is Per bend sinister Or a Rooster's Head Sable crested unguled beaked and langued Gules and Gules.

== Demographics ==
Treyvaux has a population (as of December 2020) of 1,466. As of 2008, 8.0% of the population are resident foreign nationals. Over the last 10 years (2000–2010) the population has changed at a rate of 10.5%. Migration accounted for 5.7%, while births and deaths accounted for 5%.

Most of the population (as of 2000) speaks French (1,165 or 93.3%) as their first language, German is the second most common (41 or 3.3%) and Portuguese is the third (23 or 1.8%). There are 6 people who speak Italian and 1 person who speaks Romansh.

As of 2008, the population was 49.9% male and 50.1% female. The population was made up of 637 Swiss men (45.5% of the population) and 62 (4.4%) non-Swiss men. There were 640 Swiss women (45.7%) and 62 (4.4%) non-Swiss women. Of the population in the municipality, 612 or about 49.0% were born in Treyvaux and lived there in 2000. There were 439 or 35.2% who were born in the same canton, while 101 or 8.1% were born somewhere else in Switzerland, and 88 or 7.1% were born outside of Switzerland.

As of 2000, children and teenagers (0–19 years old) make up 30.1% of the population, while adults (20–64 years old) make up 56.9% and seniors (over 64 years old) make up 13%.

As of 2000, there were 531 people who were single and never married in the municipality. There were 632 married individuals, 59 widows or widowers and 26 individuals who were divorced.

As of 2000, there were 453 private households in the municipality, and an average of 2.7 persons per household. There were 104 households that consist of only one person and 55 households with five or more people. In 2000, a total of 449 apartments (89.1% of the total) were permanently occupied, while 27 apartments (5.4%) were seasonally occupied and 28 apartments (5.6%) were empty. As of 2009, the construction rate of new housing units was 4.9 new units per 1000 residents. The vacancy rate for the municipality, in 2010, was 0.54%.

The historical population is given in the following chart:

== Heritage sites of national significance ==
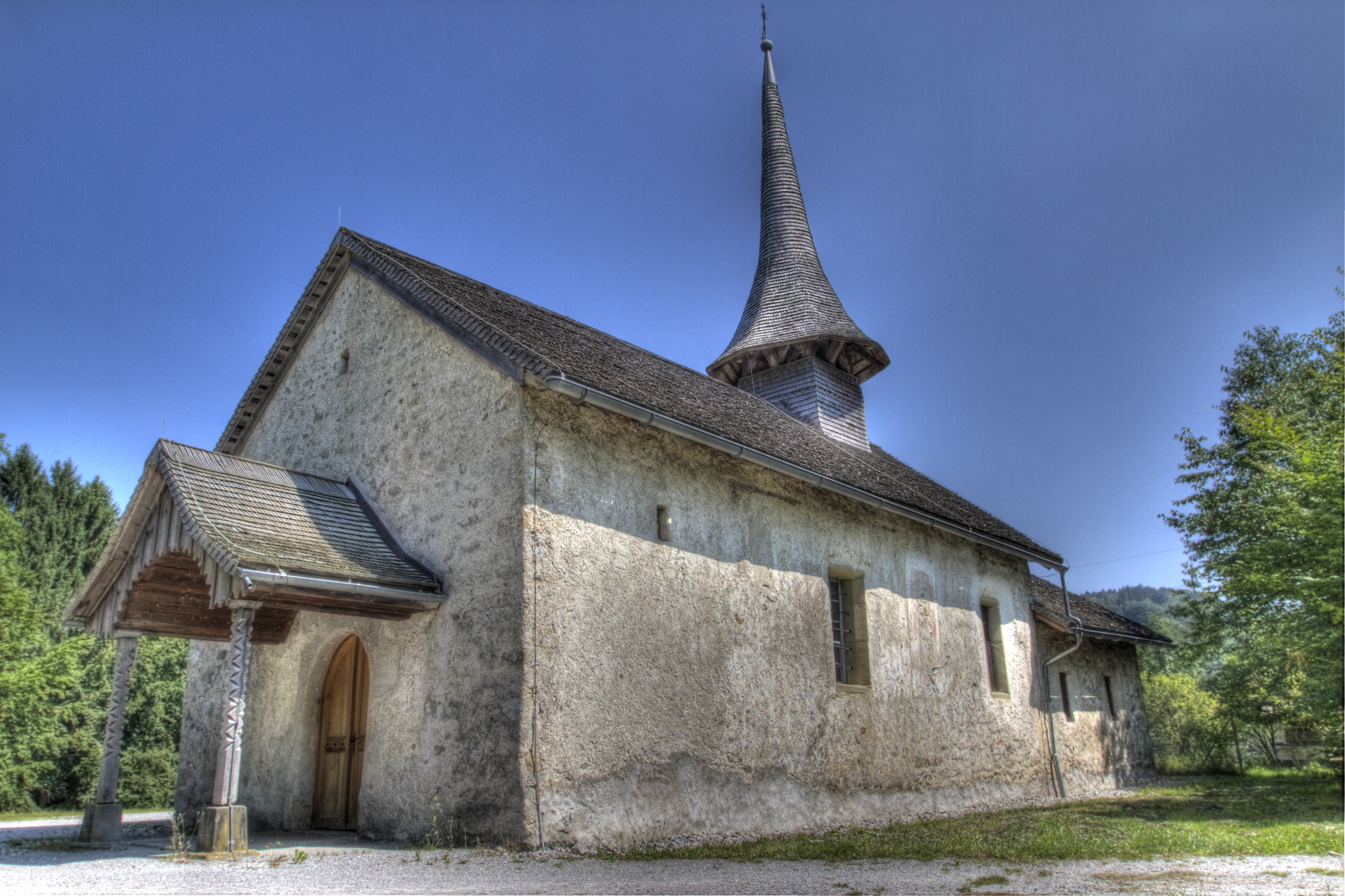
Church of Saint-Pierre

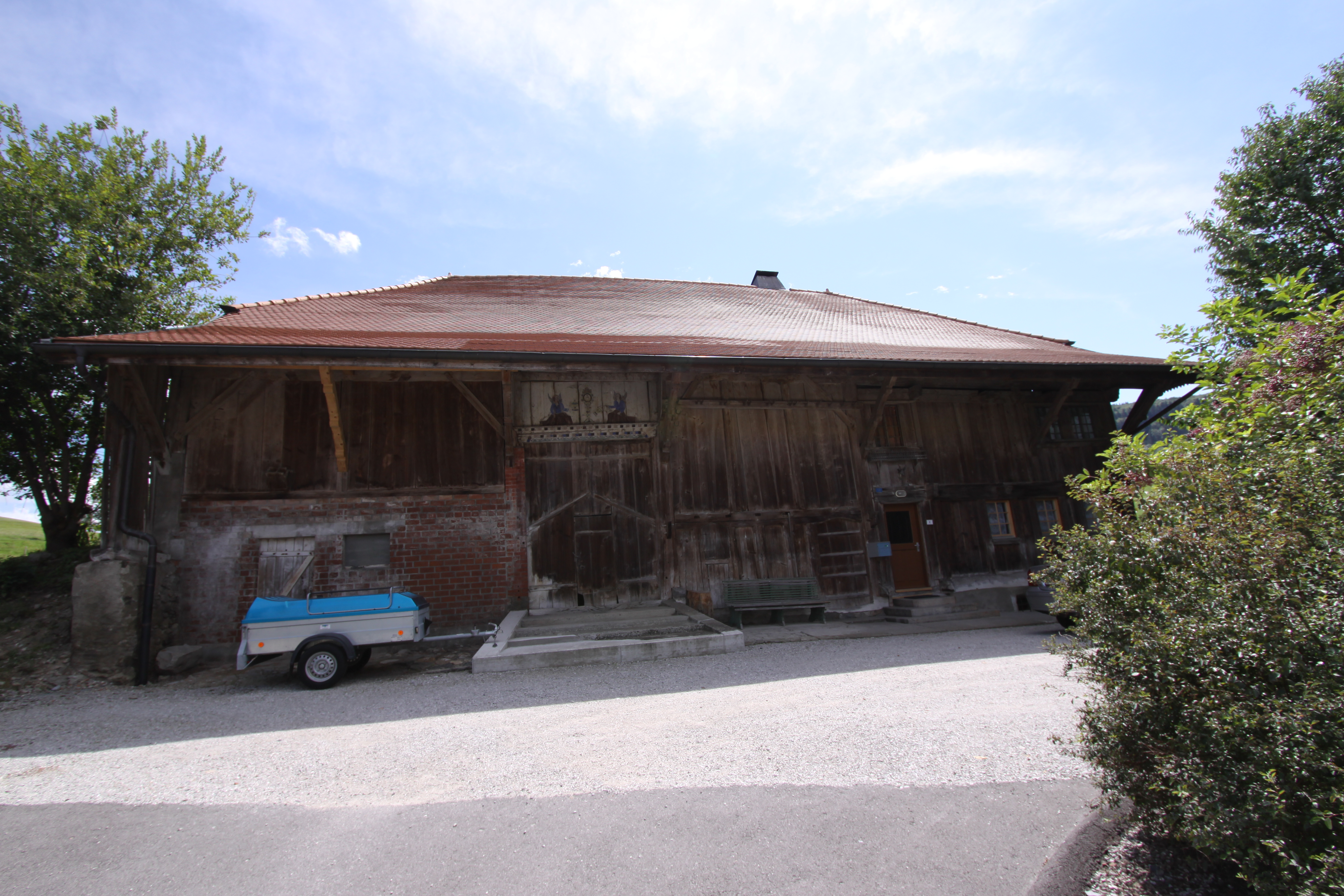
Farm House

The former Church of Saint-Pierre and the farm house at Le Pré de la Maison 12 are listed as Swiss heritage site of national significance.

== Politics ==
In the 2011 federal election the most popular party was the SVP which received 23.4% of the vote. The next three most popular parties were the SPS (23.2%), the FDP (21.9%) and the CVP (19.0%).

The SVP improved their position in Treyvaux rising to first, from fourth in 2007 (with 19.2%) The SPS moved from third in 2007 (with 22.1%) to second in 2011, the FDP moved from first in 2007 (with 25.2%) to third and the CVP moved from second in 2007 (with 23.7%) to fourth. A total of 592 votes were cast in this election, of which 6 or 1.0% were invalid.

== Economy ==
As of 2010, Treyvaux had an unemployment rate of 1.7%. As of 2008, there were 91 people employed in the primary economic sector and about 35 businesses involved in this sector. 238 people were employed in the secondary sector and there were 18 businesses in this sector. 119 people were employed in the tertiary sector, with 24 businesses in this sector. There were 611 residents of the municipality who were employed in some capacity, of which females made up 40.3% of the workforce.

In 2008 the total number of full-time equivalent jobs was 385. The number of jobs in the primary sector was 72, of which 68 were in agriculture and 4 were in forestry or lumber production. The number of jobs in the secondary sector was 217 of which 135 or (62.2%) were in manufacturing and 83 (38.2%) were in construction. The number of jobs in the tertiary sector was 96. In the tertiary sector; 14 or 14.6% were in wholesale or retail sales or the repair of motor vehicles, 5 or 5.2% were in the movement and storage of goods, 7 or 7.3% were in a hotel or restaurant, 1 was in the information industry, 5 or 5.2% were the insurance or financial industry, 7 or 7.3% were technical professionals or scientists, 11 or 11.5% were in education and 3 or 3.1% were in health care.

In 2000, there were 188 workers who commuted into the municipality and 378 workers who commuted away. The municipality is a net exporter of workers, with about 2.0 workers leaving the municipality for every one entering. Of the working population, 6.7% used public transportation to get to work, and 66.4% used a private car.

== Religion ==
From the 2000 census, 1,145 or 91.7% were Roman Catholic, while 38 or 3.0% belonged to the Swiss Reformed Church. There were 6 (or about 0.48% of the population) who were Islamic. There was 1 person who was Buddhist, 1 person who was Hindu and 1 individual who belonged to another church. 38 (or about 3.04% of the population) belonged to no church, are agnostic or atheist, and 18 individuals (or about 1.44% of the population) did not answer the question.

== Education ==
In Treyvaux about 420 or (33.7%) of the population have completed non-mandatory upper secondary education, and 117 or (9.4%) have completed additional higher education (either university or a Fachhochschule). Of the 117 who completed tertiary schooling, 75.2% were Swiss men, 22.2% were Swiss women.

The Canton of Fribourg school system provides one year of non-obligatory Kindergarten, followed by six years of Primary school. This is followed by three years of obligatory lower Secondary school where the students are separated according to ability and aptitude. Following the lower Secondary students may attend a three or four year optional upper Secondary school. The upper Secondary school is divided into gymnasium (university preparatory) and vocational programs. After they finish the upper Secondary program, students may choose to attend a Tertiary school or continue their apprenticeship.

During the 2010-11 school year, there were a total of 161 students attending 8 classes in Treyvaux. A total of 320 students from the municipality attended any school, either in the municipality or outside of it. There were 2 kindergarten classes with a total of 39 students in the municipality. The municipality had 6 primary classes and 122 students. During the same year, there were no lower secondary classes in the municipality, but 66 students attended lower secondary school in a neighboring municipality. There were no upper Secondary classes or vocational classes, but there were 30 upper Secondary students and 56 upper Secondary vocational students who attended classes in another municipality. The municipality had no non-university Tertiary classes, but there were 3 non-university Tertiary students and 4 specialized Tertiary students who attended classes in another municipality.

As of 2000, there were 2 students in Treyvaux who came from another municipality, while 118 residents attended schools outside the municipality.
