= Rossens, Fribourg =

Rossens
- Former municipality
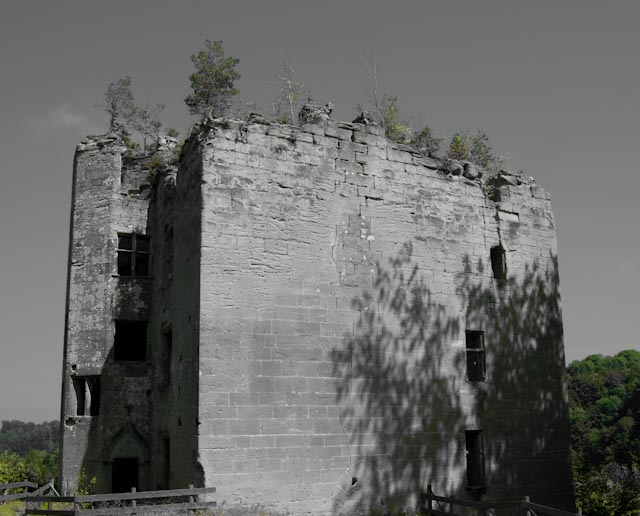
- Illens Castle in Illens village

- Coat of arms
- Location of Rossens
- Location within Switzerland Location within Canton of Fribourg
- Coordinates: 46°43′N 7°6′E
- Country: Switzerland
- Canton: Fribourg
- District: Sarine

Government
  - Mayor: Syndic

Area
  - Total: 5 km^{2} (1.9 sq mi)
- Elevation: 706 m (2,316 ft)

Population (Dec 2014)
  - Total: 1,293
  - Density: 260/km^{2} (670/sq mi)
- Time zone: UTC+01:00 (CET)
  - Summer (DST): UTC+02:00 (CEST)
- Postal code: 1728
- SFOS number: 2222
- ISO 3166 code: CH-FR
- Surrounded by: Arconciel, Corpataux-Magnedens, Farvagny, Pont-en-Ogoz, Pont-la-Ville, Treyvaux
- Website: commune-gibloux.ch

Rossens (French: [ʁɔsɑ̃s], Franco-Provençal: [ʁɔˈʃɛ̃]) is a former municipality in the district of Sarine in the canton of Fribourg in Switzerland. On 1 January 2016 it merged with Corpataux-Magnedens, Farvagny, Le Glèbe and Vuisternens-en-Ogoz to form the new municipality of Gibloux.

== History ==
Rossens is first mentioned in 1162 as Rossens. The municipality was formerly known by its German name Rossing, however, that name is no longer used.

== Geography ==
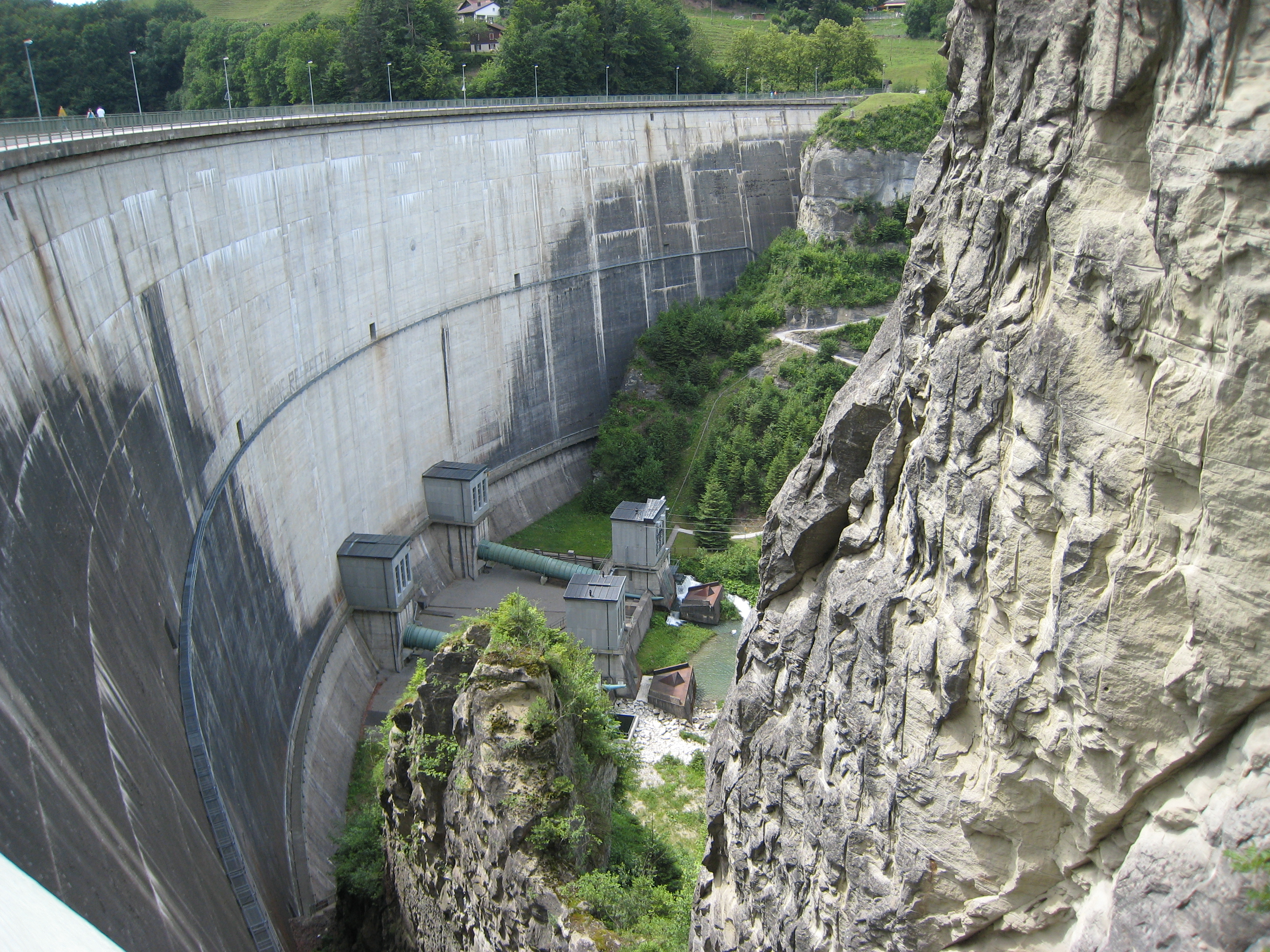
Rossens dam

Rossens had an area, as of 2009, of 5.1 square kilometers (2.0 mi^{2}). Of this area, 2.43 km^{2} (0.94 mi^{2}) or 47.6% is used for agricultural purposes, while 1.76 km^{2} (0.68 mi^{2}) or 34.5% is forested. Of the rest of the land, 0.82 km^{2} (0.32 mi^{2}) or 16.1% is settled (buildings or roads), 0.04 km^{2} (9.9 acres) or 0.8% is either rivers or lakes.

Of the built up area, industrial buildings made up 1.2% of the total area while housing and buildings made up 8.2% and transportation infrastructure made up 5.5%. Out of the forested land, 33.3% of the total land area is heavily forested and 1.2% is covered with orchards or small clusters of trees. Of the agricultural land, 27.1% is used for growing crops and 20.4% is pastures. Of the water in the municipality, 0.2% is in lakes and 0.6% is in rivers and streams.

The former municipality is located in the Saane district, on the northern end of the Lake of Gruyère. It consists of the village of Rossens and since 1 June 1972 the former municipality of Illens.

== Coat of arms ==
The blazon of the municipal coat of arms is Gules between two Post-horns Argent on a Bend Or a Lion passant Azure langued of the first.

== Demographics ==
Rossens had a population (as of 2014) of 1293. As of 2008, 7.5% of the population are resident foreign nationals. Over the last 10 years (2000–2010) the population has changed at a rate of 8.4%. Migration accounted for 2.9%, while births and deaths accounted for 7.6%.

Most of the population (as of 2000) speaks French (1,012 or 90.8%) as their first language, German is the second most common (63 or 5.7%) and Portuguese is the third (13 or 1.2%). There are 6 people who speak Italian.

As of 2008, the population was 50.3% male and 49.7% female. The population was made up of 535 Swiss men (46.0% of the population) and 51 (4.4%) non-Swiss men. There were 534 Swiss women (45.9%) and 44 (3.8%) non-Swiss women. Of the population in the municipality, 339 or about 30.4% were born in Rossens and lived there in 2000. There were 520 or 46.7% who were born in the same canton, while 124 or 11.1% were born somewhere else in Switzerland, and 101 or 9.1% were born outside of Switzerland.

As of 2000, children and teenagers (0–19 years old) make up 28.5% of the population, while adults (20–64 years old) make up 63.9% and seniors (over 64 years old) make up 7.5%.

As of 2000, there were 481 people who were single and never married in the municipality. There were 574 married individuals, 23 widows or widowers and 36 individuals who are divorced.

As of 2000, there were 396 private households in the municipality, and an average of 2.8 persons per household. There were 72 households that consist of only one person and 42 households with five or more people. In 2000, a total of 389 apartments (93.1% of the total) were permanently occupied, while 24 apartments (5.7%) were seasonally occupied and 5 apartments (1.2%) were empty. As of 2009, the construction rate of new housing units was 3.3 new units per 1000 residents. The vacancy rate for the municipality, in 2010, was 0.86%.

The historical population is given in the following chart:

== Heritage sites of national significance ==
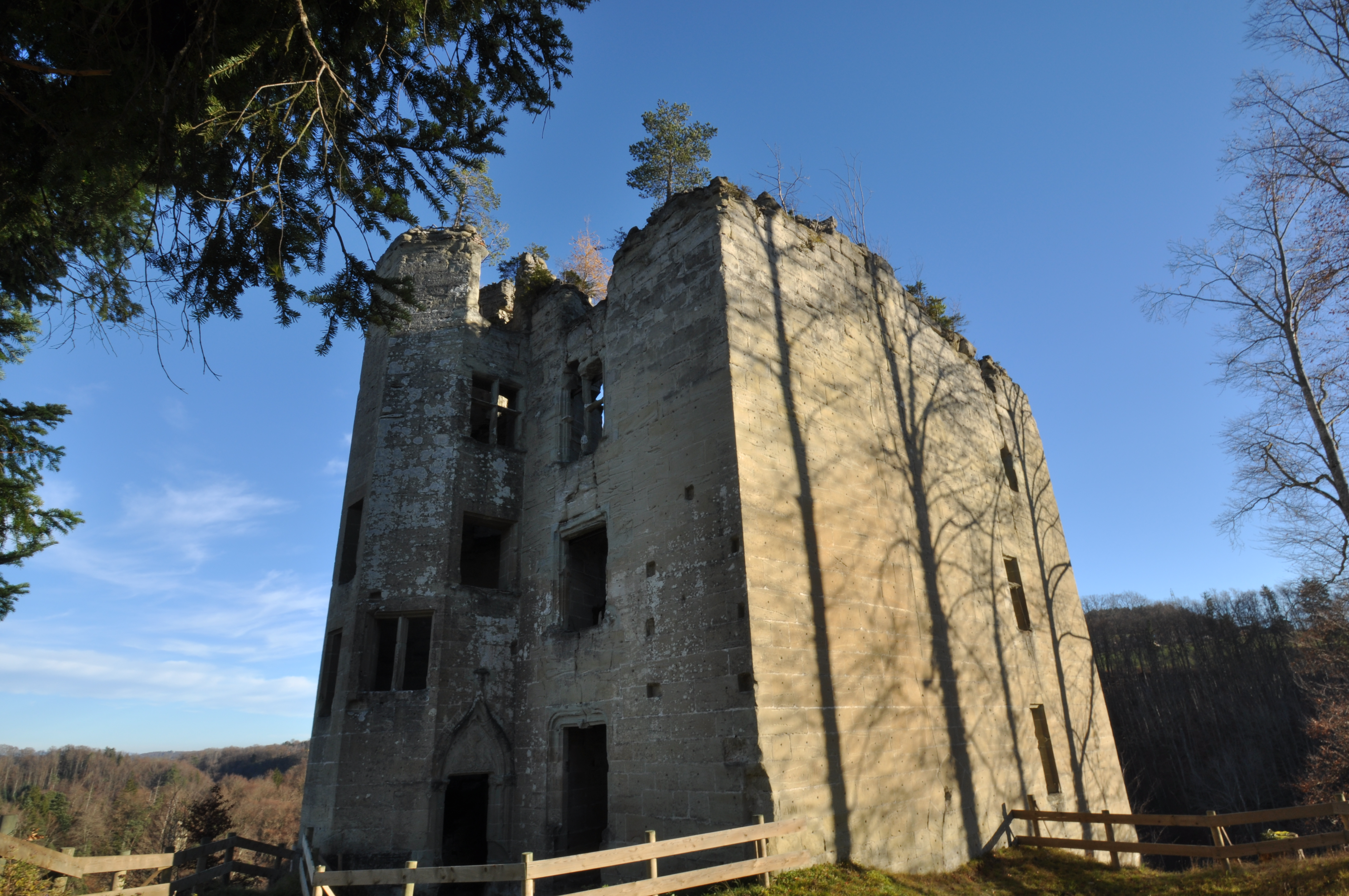
Illens Castle

The ruin of Illens Castle is listed as a Swiss heritage site of national significance.

== Twin Town ==
Rossens is twinned with the town of St-Rémy in the Deux-Sèvres department in France.

== Politics ==
In the 2011 federal election the most popular party was the SPS which received 33.9% of the vote. The next three most popular parties were the CVP (23.3%), the SVP (16.2%) and the FDP (10.2%).

The SPS received about the same percentage of the vote as they did in the 2007 Federal election (30.3% in 2007 vs 33.9% in 2011). The CVP lost popularity (28.6% in 2007), the SVP retained about the same popularity (18.3% in 2007) and the FDP retained about the same popularity (8.1% in 2007). A total of 484 votes were cast in this election, of which 7 or 1.4% were invalid.

== Economy ==
As of 2010, Rossens had an unemployment rate of 1.5%. As of 2008, there were 22 people employed in the primary economic sector and about 9 businesses involved in this sector. 404 people were employed in the secondary sector and there were 10 businesses in this sector. 147 people were employed in the tertiary sector, with 34 businesses in this sector. There were 606 residents of the municipality who were employed in some capacity, of which females made up 44.4% of the workforce.

In 2008 the total number of full-time equivalent jobs was 508. The number of jobs in the primary sector was 17, all of which were in agriculture. The number of jobs in the secondary sector was 385 of which 268 or (69.6%) were in manufacturing and 118 (30.6%) were in construction. The number of jobs in the tertiary sector was 106. In the tertiary sector; 47 or 44.3% were in wholesale or retail sales or the repair of motor vehicles, 6 or 5.7% were in the movement and storage of goods, 5 or 4.7% were in a hotel or restaurant, 8 or 7.5% were in the information industry, 3 or 2.8% were the insurance or financial industry, 7 or 6.6% were technical professionals or scientists, 20 or 18.9% were in education and 2 or 1.9% were in health care.

In 2000, there were 213 workers who commuted into the municipality and 486 workers who commuted away. The municipality is a net exporter of workers, with about 2.3 workers leaving the municipality for every one entering. Of the working population, 7.8% used public transportation to get to work, and 77.7% used a private car.

== Religion ==
From the 2000 census, 965 or 86.6% were Roman Catholic, while 55 or 4.9% belonged to the Swiss Reformed Church. Of the rest of the population, there were 4 members of an Orthodox church (or about 0.36% of the population), and there were 14 individuals (or about 1.26% of the population) who belonged to another Christian church. There were 8 (or about 0.72% of the population) who were Islamic. 41 (or about 3.68% of the population) belonged to no church, are agnostic or atheist, and 31 individuals (or about 2.78% of the population) did not answer the question.

== Education ==
In Rossens about 394 or (35.4%) of the population have completed non-mandatory upper secondary education, and 175 or (15.7%) have completed additional higher education (either university or a Fachhochschule). Of the 175 who completed tertiary schooling, 63.4% were Swiss men, 23.4% were Swiss women, 8.0% were non-Swiss men and 5.1% were non-Swiss women.

The Canton of Fribourg school system provides one year of non-obligatory Kindergarten, followed by six years of Primary school. This is followed by three years of obligatory lower Secondary school where the students are separated according to ability and aptitude. Following the lower Secondary students may attend a three or four year optional upper Secondary school. The upper Secondary school is divided into gymnasium (university preparatory) and vocational programs. After they finish the upper Secondary program, students may choose to attend a Tertiary school or continue their apprenticeship.

During the 2010-11 school year, there were a total of 187 students attending 9 classes in Rossens. A total of 293 students from the municipality attended any school, either in the municipality or outside of it. There were 2 kindergarten classes with a total of 47 students in the municipality. The municipality had 7 primary classes and 140 students. During the same year, there were no lower secondary classes in the municipality, but 62 students attended lower secondary school in a neighboring municipality. There were no upper Secondary classes or vocational classes, but there were 33 upper Secondary students and 36 upper Secondary vocational students who attended classes in another municipality. The municipality had no non-university Tertiary classes, but there were 3 non-university Tertiary students and 4 specialized Tertiary students who attended classes in another municipality.

As of 2000, there were 32 students in Rossens who came from another municipality, while 95 residents attended schools outside the municipality.
