= Prez, Switzerland =

Prez
- Municipality
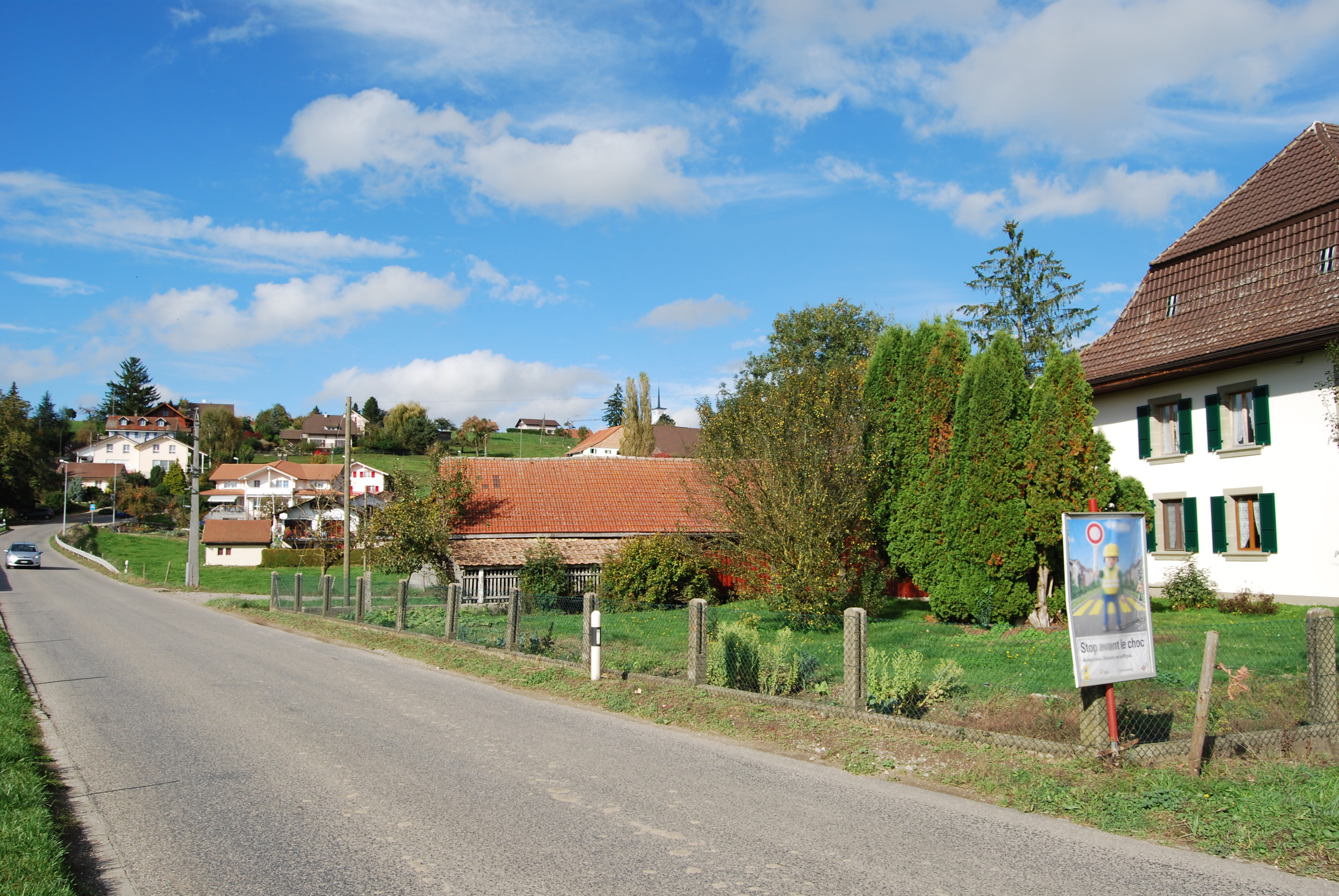
- Noréaz village

- Coat of arms
- Location of Prez
- Location within Switzerland Location within Canton of Fribourg
- Coordinates: 46°47′N 7°1′E
- Country: Switzerland
- Canton: Fribourg
- District: Sarine

Government
  - Mayor: Syndic

Area
  - Total: 12.61 km^{2} (4.87 sq mi)

Population (December 2020)
  - Total: 2,345
  - Density: 186.0/km^{2} (481.6/sq mi)
- Time zone: UTC+01:00 (CET)
  - Summer (DST): UTC+02:00 (CEST)
- Postal codes: 1746,1747 & 1757
- SFOS number: 2237
- ISO 3166 code: CH-FR
- Surrounded by: Avry, Corminboeuf, Grolley-Ponthaux, La Brillaz, Montagny, Torny
- Website: https://prez.ch/

Prez (French pronunciation: [pʁe]) is a municipality in the district of Sarine in the canton of Fribourg in Switzerland. On 1 January 2020, the former municipalities of Corserey, Noréaz and Prez-vers-Noréaz merged to form the new municipality of Prez.

== World Heritage Site ==
The former municipality of Noréaz is home to the En Praz des Gueux prehistoric pile-dwelling (or stilt house) settlements that are part of the Prehistoric Pile dwellings around the Alps UNESCO World Heritage Site.

En Praz des Gueux is the only prehistoric lakeside settlement on the banks of a small lake in the Canton of Fribourg. The site is dated to the classic Cortaillod era (4000-3500 BC). The site was discovered by accident in 1971 in a boggy area near the present shore of the Lac de Seedorf. Under a layer of about 70 cm (28 in) of peat timbers, gravel and stone slabs were discovered.

== History ==
=== Corserey ===
Corserey is first mentioned around 1150-62 as Corserei.

=== Noréaz ===
Noréaz is first mentioned in 1134 as Noarea.

=== Prez-vers-Noréaz ===
Prez-vers-Noréaz is first mentioned in 1156 as de Pratellis.

== Geography ==
Post-merger Prez has an area, (as of the 2004/09 survey), of 12.61 km^{2} (4.87 sq mi).

== Demographics ==
The new municipality has a population (as of December 2020) of 2,345.

== Historic Population ==
The historical population is given in the following chart:
