= Seedorf =

Seedorf (in some cases, formerly Seidorf) may refer to:

== Places ==
=== Germany ===
- Seedorf, Lower Saxony, municipality in the district of Rotenburg, Lower Saxony
- Seedorf, Lauenburg, in the district of Lauenburg, Schleswig-Holstein
- Seedorf, Segeberg, in the district of Segeberg, Schleswig-Holstein

=== Switzerland ===
- Seedorf, Bern, a municipality in the Canton of Bern
- Seedorf, Uri, a municipality in the Canton of Uri
- Seedorf, Fribourg, a place in the municipality of Noréaz in the canton of Fribourg
  - Lac de Seedorf, lake at the above

== People ==
- Seedorf family, Dutch-Surinamese footballing family
