= Prez-vers-Noréaz =

- Former municipality
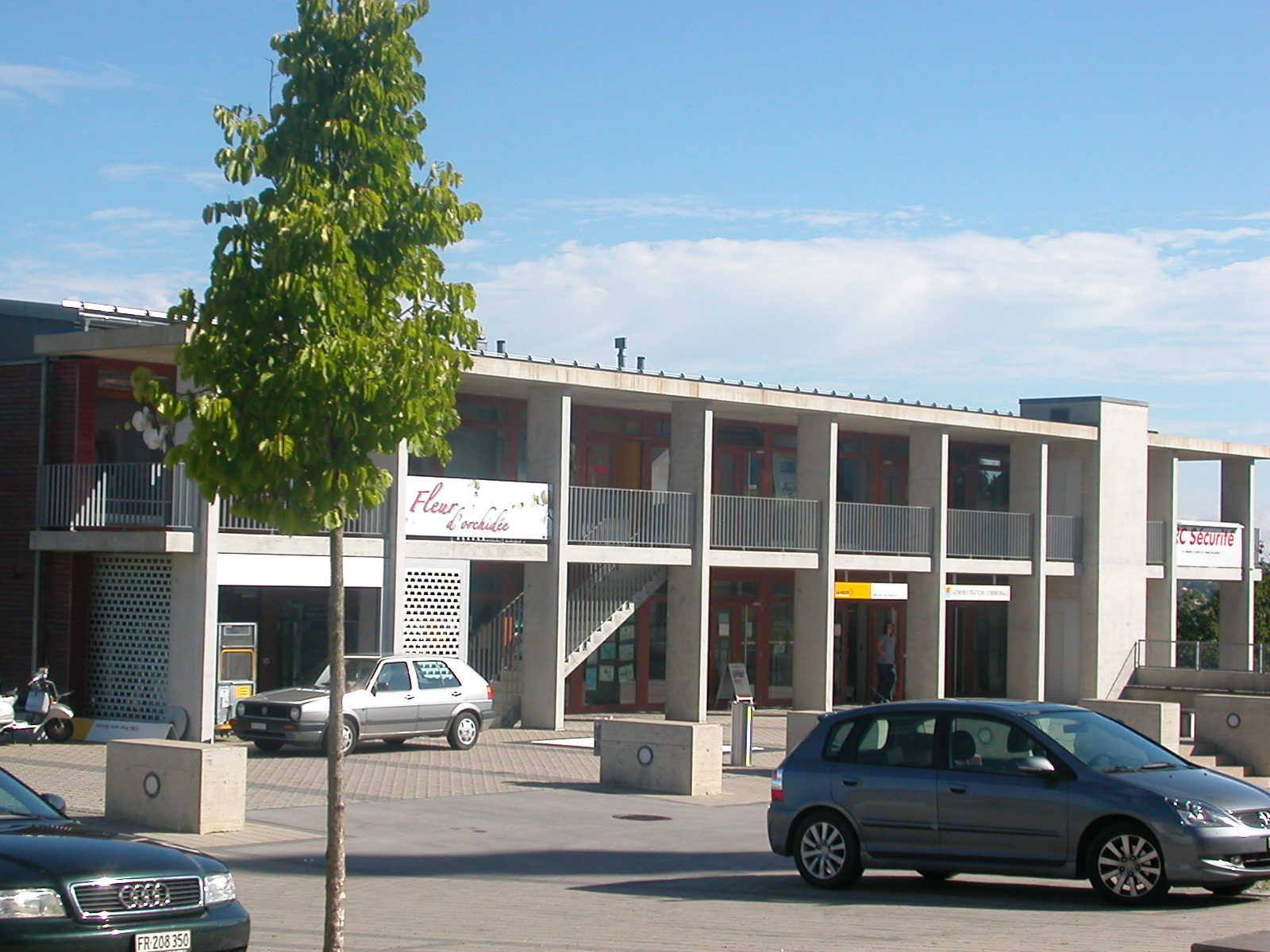
- Town hall of Prez-vers-Noréaz

- Coat of arms
- Location of Prez-vers-Noréaz
- Location within Switzerland Location within Canton of Fribourg
- Coordinates: 46°47′N 7°1′E
- Country: Switzerland
- Canton: Fribourg
- District: Sarine

Government
  - Mayor: Syndic

Area
  - Total: 5.71 km^{2} (2.20 sq mi)
- Elevation: 646 m (2,119 ft)

Population (December 2020)
  - Total: 1,126
  - Density: 197/km^{2} (511/sq mi)
- Time zone: UTC+01:00 (CET)
  - Summer (DST): UTC+02:00 (CEST)
- Postal code: 1746
- SFOS number: 2221
- ISO 3166 code: CH-FR
- Surrounded by: Avry, Corserey, La Brillaz, Montagny, Noréaz
- Website: www.prez-vers-noreaz.ch

Prez-vers-Noréaz (French pronunciation: [pʁe vɛʁ nɔʁea]) is a former municipality in the district of Sarine in the canton of Fribourg in Switzerland. On 1 January 2020 the former municipalities of Corserey, Noréaz and Prez-vers-Noréaz merged to form the new municipality of Prez.

== History ==
Prez-vers-Noréaz is first mentioned in 1156 as de Pratellis.

== Geography ==
Prez-vers-Noréaz has an area, as of 2009, of 5.7 square kilometers (2.2 mi^{2}). Of this area, 4.12 km^{2} (1.59 mi^{2}) or 72.5% is used for agricultural purposes, while 1.08 km^{2} (0.42 mi^{2}) or 19.0% is forested. Of the rest of the land, 0.5 km^{2} (0.19 mi^{2}) or 8.8% is settled (buildings or roads), 0.01 km^{2} (2.5 acres) or 0.2% is either rivers or lakes.

Of the built up area, housing and buildings made up 6.3% and transportation infrastructure made up 2.1%. Out of the forested land, 17.8% of the total land area is heavily forested and 1.2% is covered with orchards or small clusters of trees. Of the agricultural land, 56.3% is used for growing crops and 15.0% is pastures, while 1.2% is used for orchards or vine crops. All the water in the municipality is flowing water.

The municipality is located in the Sarine district, on the Fribourg-Payerne road.

== Coat of arms ==
The blazon of the municipal coat of arms is Per fess Or a Semi Lion rampant isuant Gules and Azure.

== Demographics ==
Prez-vers-Noréaz has a population (as of December 2020) of 1,126. As of 2008, 10.2% of the population are resident foreign nationals. Over the last 10 years (2000–2010) the population has changed at a rate of 5.4%. Migration accounted for -0.5%, while births and deaths accounted for 4.6%.

Most of the population (as of 2000) speaks French (734 or 91.1%) as their first language, German is the second most common (49 or 6.1%) and Danish is the third (10 or 1.2%). There are 6 people who speak Italian.

As of 2008, the population was 48.2% male and 51.8% female. The population was made up of 356 Swiss men (42.3% of the population) and 50 (5.9%) non-Swiss men. There were 386 Swiss women (45.8%) and 50 (5.9%) non-Swiss women. Of the population in the municipality, 284 or about 35.2% were born in Prez-vers-Noréaz and lived there in 2000. There were 331 or 41.1% who were born in the same canton, while 120 or 14.9% were born somewhere else in Switzerland, and 65 or 8.1% were born outside of Switzerland.

As of 2000, children and teenagers (0–19 years old) make up 29.9% of the population, while adults (20–64 years old) make up 58.8% and seniors (over 64 years old) make up 11.3%.

As of 2000, there were 355 people who were single and never married in the municipality. There were 389 married individuals, 29 widows or widowers and 33 individuals who are divorced.

As of 2000, there were 294 private households in the municipality, and an average of 2.7 persons per household. There were 59 households that consist of only one person and 35 households with five or more people. In 2000, a total of 286 apartments (93.5% of the total) were permanently occupied, while 13 apartments (4.2%) were seasonally occupied and 7 apartments (2.3%) were empty. As of 2009, the construction rate of new housing units was 5.9 new units per 1000 residents.

The historical population is given in the following chart:

== Politics ==
In the 2011 federal election the most popular party was the SPS which received 28.4% of the vote. The next three most popular parties were the SVP (23.1%), the CVP (20.2%) and the FDP (8.8%).

The SPS improved their position in Prez-vers-Noréaz rising to first, from second in 2007 (with 27.3%) The SVP moved from third in 2007 (with 21.5%) to second in 2011, the CVP moved from first in 2007 (with 28.3%) to third and the FDP retained about the same popularity (8.0% in 2007). A total of 257 votes were cast in this election, of which 10 or 3.9% were invalid.

== Economy ==
As of 2010, Prez-vers-Noréaz had an unemployment rate of 2.7%. As of 2008, there were 44 people employed in the primary economic sector and about 17 businesses involved in this sector. 45 people were employed in the secondary sector and there were 8 businesses in this sector. 54 people were employed in the tertiary sector, with 20 businesses in this sector. There were 411 residents of the municipality who were employed in some capacity, of which females made up 44.3% of the workforce.

In 2008 the total number of full-time equivalent jobs was 118. The number of jobs in the primary sector was 34, of which 31 were in agriculture and 2 were in forestry or lumber production. The number of jobs in the secondary sector was 38 of which 34 or (89.5%) were in manufacturing and 4 (10.5%) were in construction. The number of jobs in the tertiary sector was 46. In the tertiary sector; 13 or 28.3% were in wholesale or retail sales or the repair of motor vehicles, 12 or 26.1% were in the movement and storage of goods, 6 or 13.0% were in a hotel or restaurant, 5 or 10.9% were in education and 2 or 4.3% were in health care.

In 2000, there were 25 workers who commuted into the municipality and 325 workers who commuted away. The municipality is a net exporter of workers, with about 13.0 workers leaving the municipality for every one entering. Of the working population, 6.1% used public transportation to get to work, and 76.2% used a private car.

== Religion ==
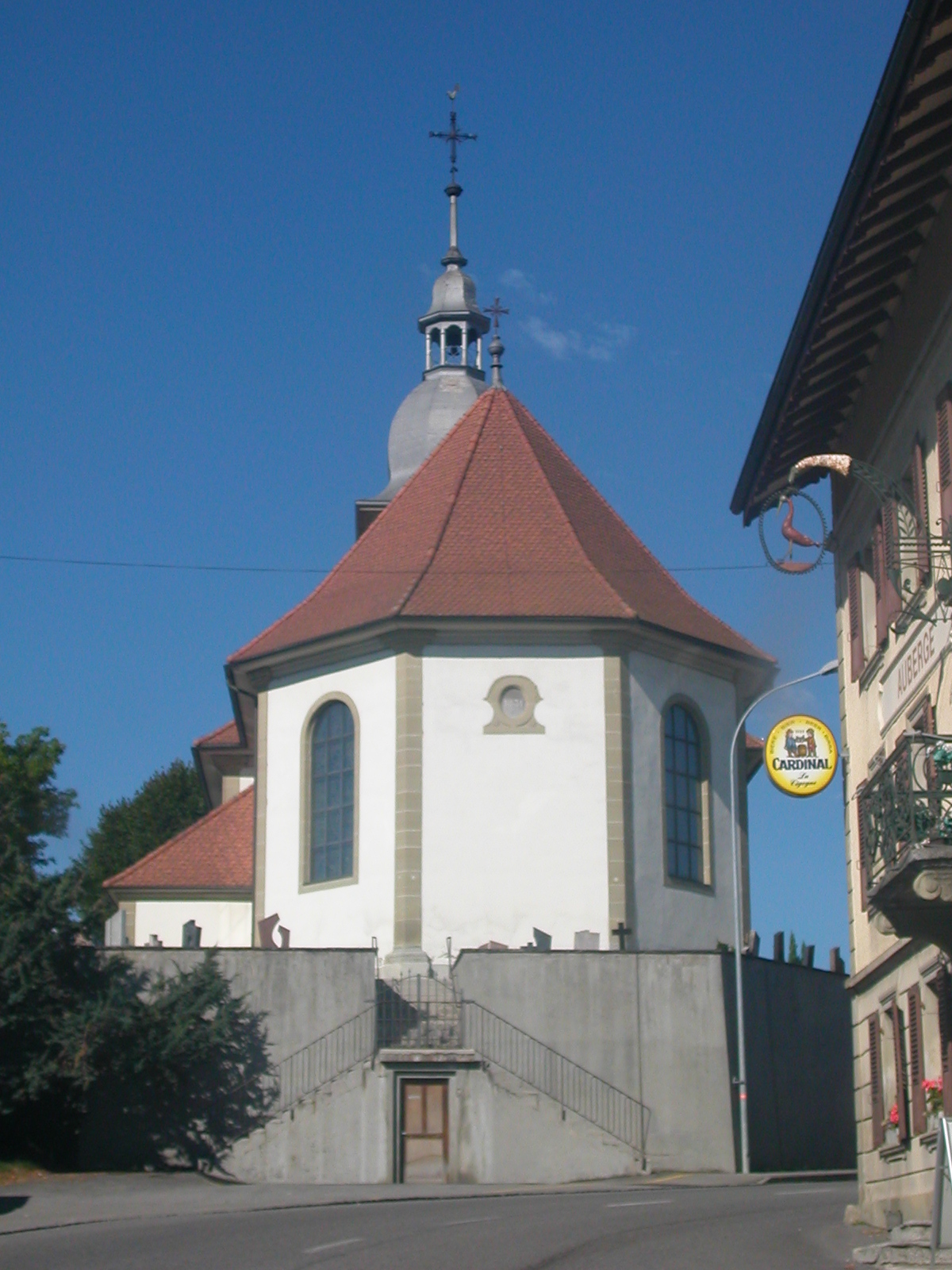
Prez-vers-Noréaz church

From the 2000 census, 663 or 82.3% were Roman Catholic, while 70 or 8.7% belonged to the Swiss Reformed Church. Of the rest of the population, there were 4 members of an Orthodox church (or about 0.50% of the population), there was 1 individual who belongs to the Christian Catholic Church, and there were 18 individuals (or about 2.23% of the population) who belonged to another Christian church. 38 (or about 4.71% of the population) belonged to no church, are agnostic or atheist, and 21 individuals (or about 2.61% of the population) did not answer the question.

== Education ==
In Prez-vers-Noréaz about 281 or (34.9%) of the population have completed non-mandatory upper secondary education, and 101 or (12.5%) have completed additional higher education (either university or a Fachhochschule). Of the 101 who completed tertiary schooling, 59.4% were Swiss men, 21.8% were Swiss women, 9.9% were non-Swiss men and 8.9% were non-Swiss women.

The Canton of Fribourg school system provides one year of non-obligatory Kindergarten, followed by six years of Primary school. This is followed by three years of obligatory lower Secondary school where the students are separated according to ability and aptitude. Following the lower Secondary students may attend a three or four year optional upper Secondary school. The upper Secondary school is divided into gymnasium (university preparatory) and vocational programs. After they finish the upper Secondary program, students may choose to attend a Tertiary school or continue their apprenticeship.

During the 2010-11 school year, there were a total of 80 students attending 4 classes in Prez-vers-Noréaz. A total of 191 students from the municipality attended any school, either in the municipality or outside of it. There was one kindergarten class with a total of 21 students in the municipality. The municipality had 3 primary classes and 59 students. During the same year, there were no lower secondary classes in the municipality, but 47 students attended lower secondary school in a neighboring municipality. There were no upper Secondary classes or vocational classes, but there were 25 upper Secondary students and 27 upper Secondary vocational students who attended classes in another municipality. The municipality had no non-university Tertiary classes, but there were 2 non-university Tertiary students and 5 specialized Tertiary students who attended classes in another municipality.

As of 2000, there were 17 students in Prez-vers-Noréaz who came from another municipality, while 107 residents attended schools outside the municipality.
