= Matran =

- Municipality
- Coat of arms
- Location of Matran
- Location within Switzerland Location within Canton of Fribourg
- Coordinates: 46°47′N 7°6′E
- Country: Switzerland
- Canton: Fribourg
- District: Sarine

Government
  - Mayor: Syndic

Area
  - Total: 2.89 km^{2} (1.12 sq mi)
- Elevation: 614 m (2,014 ft)

Population (December 2020)
  - Total: 1,620
  - Density: 561/km^{2} (1,450/sq mi)
- Time zone: UTC+01:00 (CET)
  - Summer (DST): UTC+02:00 (CEST)
- Postal code: 1753
- SFOS number: 2208
- ISO 3166 code: CH-FR
- Surrounded by: Avry, Corminboeuf, Hauterive, Neyruz, Villars-sur-Glâne
- Website: www.matran.ch

Matran (French: [matʁɑ̃], Franco-Provençal: [maˈtʁɑ̃]) is a municipality in the district of Sarine in the canton of Fribourg in Switzerland.

== History ==
Matran is first mentioned in 1123 as Martrans. It is then mentioned in 1138 under the name Martrens en Nuithonie. Later it changed to Martrans (1148), Matrans (1157), Martranz (1285), Martrant (1445), Martrand (1555) and Matrang (1668). The place name derives from "Martyrus".

In the Middle Ages the Abbey of Payerne owned much land in Matran. In 1442 the hamlet was sold and came into possession of Fribourg. After the collapse of the Ancien Régime (1798) Matran belonged, during the Helvetic Republic and later, to the county of Fribourg. In 1848 it became a member of the Saane District of the Canton of Fribourg.

Matran has grown from a sleepy hamlet of a few hundred farmers and their families to a population of over 1,000 inhabitants in the last 25 years. Matran boasts a wonderful gothic parish church dating back to the 16th century with rare 18th-century ceiling paintings depicting the 4 evangelists by an unknown artist, and a gigantic bronze Pieta by Hugo de Matran at the town mortuary.

The town is dominated by the former Kollegium Sankt Joseph, once a boarding school run by the Redemptorist Fathers (C. Ss. R.), which since the early 1990 serves a spiritual retreat for groups. The chapel is frequently used for broadcasts by the TV de la Suisse Romande.

Aerial view (1964)

== Geography ==
Matran has an area, as of 2009, of 2.9 square kilometers (1.1 mi^{2}). Of this area, 1.47 km^{2} (0.57 mi^{2}) or 51.4% is used for agricultural purposes, while 0.55 km^{2} (0.21 mi^{2}) or 19.2% is forested. Of the rest of the land, 0.85 km^{2} (0.33 mi^{2}) or 29.7% is settled (buildings or roads), 0.02 km^{2} (4.9 acres) or 0.7% is either rivers or lakes.

Of the built up area, industrial buildings made up 4.9% of the total area while housing and buildings made up 12.6% and transportation infrastructure made up 9.8%. Power and water infrastructure as well as other special developed areas made up 1.4% of the area Out of the forested land, all of the forested land area is covered with heavy forests. Of the agricultural land, 33.9% is used for growing crops and 17.1% is pastures. All the water in the municipality is flowing water.

The municipality is located in the Sarine district, on the left bank of the Glane river. It is at an elevation of 614 m (2,014 ft) above sea level and is about 5.5 km (3.4 mi) from the canton's capital of Fribourg.

== Coat of arms ==
The blazon of the municipal coat of arms is Azure a Lion rampant Or langued Gules holding upright a Cornucopia of the last filled with Roses of the same leaved Vert.

== Demographics ==
Matran has a population (as of December 2020) of 1,620. As of 2008, 15.2% of the population are resident foreign nationals. Over the last 10 years (2000–2010) the population has changed at a rate of 26.4%. Migration accounted for 19.4%, while births and deaths accounted for 5.5%. Most of the population (as of 2000) speaks French (1,103 or 87.5%) as their first language, German is the second most common (95 or 7.5%) and Italian is the third (18 or 1.4%).

As of 2008, the population was 50.0% male and 50.0% female. The population was made up of 652 Swiss men (41.8% of the population) and 128 (8.2%) non-Swiss men. There were 658 Swiss women (42.2%) and 123 (7.9%) non-Swiss women. Of the population in the municipality, 259 or about 20.5% were born in Matran and lived there in 2000. There were 614 or 48.7% who were born in the same canton, while 195 or 15.5% were born somewhere else in Switzerland, and 173 or 13.7% were born outside of Switzerland.

As of 2000, children and teenagers (0–19 years old) make up 31.5% of the population, while adults (20–64 years old) make up 59.6% and seniors (over 64 years old) make up 8.9%.

As of 2000, there were 568 people who were single and never married in the municipality. There were 613 married individuals, 40 widows or widowers and 40 individuals who are divorced.

As of 2000, there were 435 private households in the municipality, and an average of 2.8 persons per household. There were 86 households that consist of only one person and 52 households with five or more people. In 2000, a total of 429 apartments (88.6% of the total) were permanently occupied, while 47 apartments (9.7%) were seasonally occupied and 8 apartments (1.7%) were empty. As of 2009, the construction rate of new housing units was 41.7 new units per 1000 residents.

The historical population is given in the following chart:

== Politics ==
In the 2011 federal election the most popular party was the SPS which received 27.7% of the vote. The next three most popular parties were the CVP (23.7%), the FDP (16.3%) and the SVP (15.1%).

The SPS received about the same percentage of the vote as they did in the 2007 Federal election (31.3% in 2007 vs 27.7% in 2011). The CVP retained about the same popularity (26.3% in 2007), the FDP moved from fourth in 2007 (with 14.1%) to third and the SVP moved from third in 2007 (with 15.3%) to fourth. A total of 466 votes were cast in this election, of which 8 or 1.7% were invalid.

== Economy ==
As of 2010, Matran had an unemployment rate of 3.9%. As of 2008, there were 11 people employed in the primary economic sector and about 4 businesses involved in this sector. 480 people were employed in the secondary sector and there were 19 businesses in this sector. 530 people were employed in the tertiary sector, with 63 businesses in this sector. There were 636 residents of the municipality who were employed in some capacity, of which females made up 43.7% of the workforce.

In 2008 the total number of full-time equivalent jobs was 919. The number of jobs in the primary sector was 10, all of which were in agriculture. The number of jobs in the secondary sector was 467 of which 202 or (43.3%) were in manufacturing and 200 (42.8%) were in construction. The number of jobs in the tertiary sector was 442. In the tertiary sector; 297 or 67.2% were in wholesale or retail sales or the repair of motor vehicles, 7 or 1.6% were in the movement and storage of goods, 31 or 7.0% were in a hotel or restaurant, 65 or 14.7% were in the information industry, 15 or 3.4% were technical professionals or scientists, 10 or 2.3% were in education.

In 2000, there were 481 workers who commuted into the municipality and 525 workers who commuted away. The municipality is a net exporter of workers, with about 1.1 workers leaving the municipality for every one entering. Of the working population, 10.8% used public transportation to get to work, and 76.9% used a private car.

== Religion ==
From the 2000 census, 1,018 or 80.7% were Roman Catholic, while 84 or 6.7% belonged to the Swiss Reformed Church. Of the rest of the population, there were 9 members of an Orthodox church (or about 0.71% of the population), there were 7 individuals (or about 0.56% of the population) who belonged to the Christian Catholic Church, and there were 26 individuals (or about 2.06% of the population) who belonged to another Christian church. There were 15 (or about 1.19% of the population) who were Islamic. There were 2 individuals who were Buddhist. 65 (or about 5.15% of the population) belonged to no church, are agnostic or atheist, and 48 individuals (or about 3.81% of the population) did not answer the question.

== Education ==
In Matran about 392 or (31.1%) of the population have completed non-mandatory upper secondary education, and 204 or (16.2%) have completed additional higher education (either university or a Fachhochschule). Of the 204 who completed tertiary schooling, 63.2% were Swiss men, 27.9% were Swiss women, 4.9% were non-Swiss men and 3.9% were non-Swiss women.

The Canton of Fribourg school system provides one year of non-obligatory Kindergarten, followed by six years of Primary school. This is followed by three years of obligatory lower Secondary school where the students are separated according to ability and aptitude. Following the lower Secondary students may attend a three or four year optional upper Secondary school. The upper Secondary school is divided into gymnasium (university preparatory) and vocational programs. After they finish the upper Secondary program, students may choose to attend a Tertiary school or continue their apprenticeship.

During the 2010–11 school year, there were a total of 157 students attending 9 classes in Matran. A total of 338 students from the municipality attended any school, either in the municipality or outside of it. There were 3 kindergarten classes with a total of 40 students in the municipality. The municipality had 6 primary classes and 117 students. During the same year, there were no lower secondary classes in the municipality, but 80 students attended lower secondary school in a neighboring municipality. There were no upper Secondary classes or vocational classes, but there were 54 upper Secondary students and 40 upper Secondary vocational students who attended classes in another municipality. The municipality had no non-university Tertiary classes, but there was one non-university Tertiary student and 3 specialized Tertiary students who attended classes in another municipality.

As of 2000, there were 3 students in Matran who came from another municipality, while 128 residents attended schools outside the municipality.

== Transportation ==
The municipality has a railway station, Matran, on the Lausanne–Bern line. It has regular service to Romont FR and Fribourg/Freiburg.
