= Lac de Seedorf =

Lake in Fribourg, Switzerland

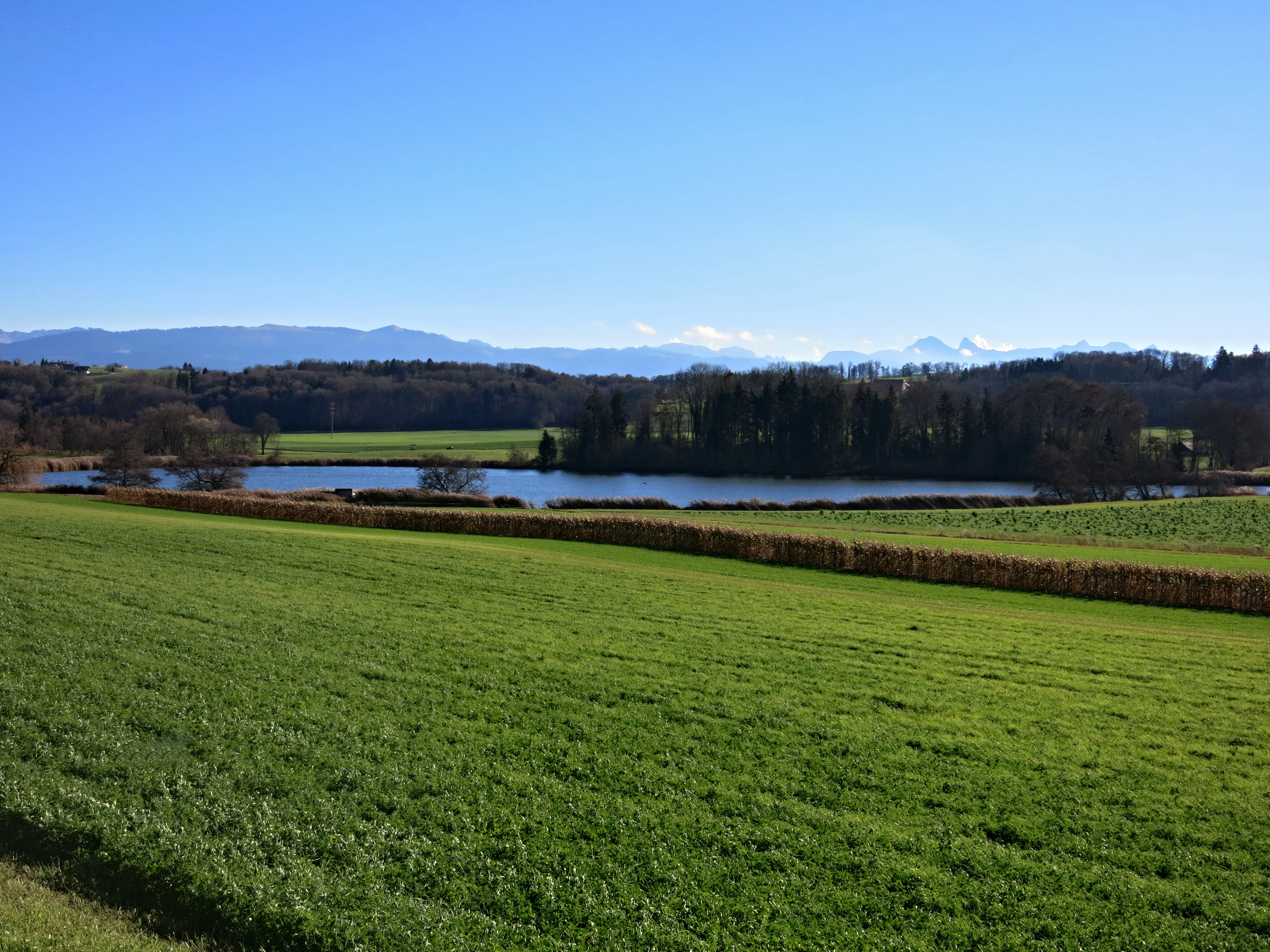
- Lac de Seedorf

- Location within Canton of Fribourg Location within Switzerland Location within Alps
- Interactive map of Lac de Seedorf
- Location: Fribourg
- Coordinates: 46°47′45″N 7°02′26″E
- Primary inflows: Sonnaz
- Primary outflows: Sonnaz
- Basin countries: Switzerland
- Surface area: 11 ha (27 acres)
- Surface elevation: 609 m (1,998 ft)

Lac de Seedorf (also: Seedorfsee) is a lake at Noréaz in the municipality of Prez, Canton of Fribourg, Switzerland. Its surface area is 27 acres.
