= Matran railway station =

Former railway station in Matran, Switzerland

Matran
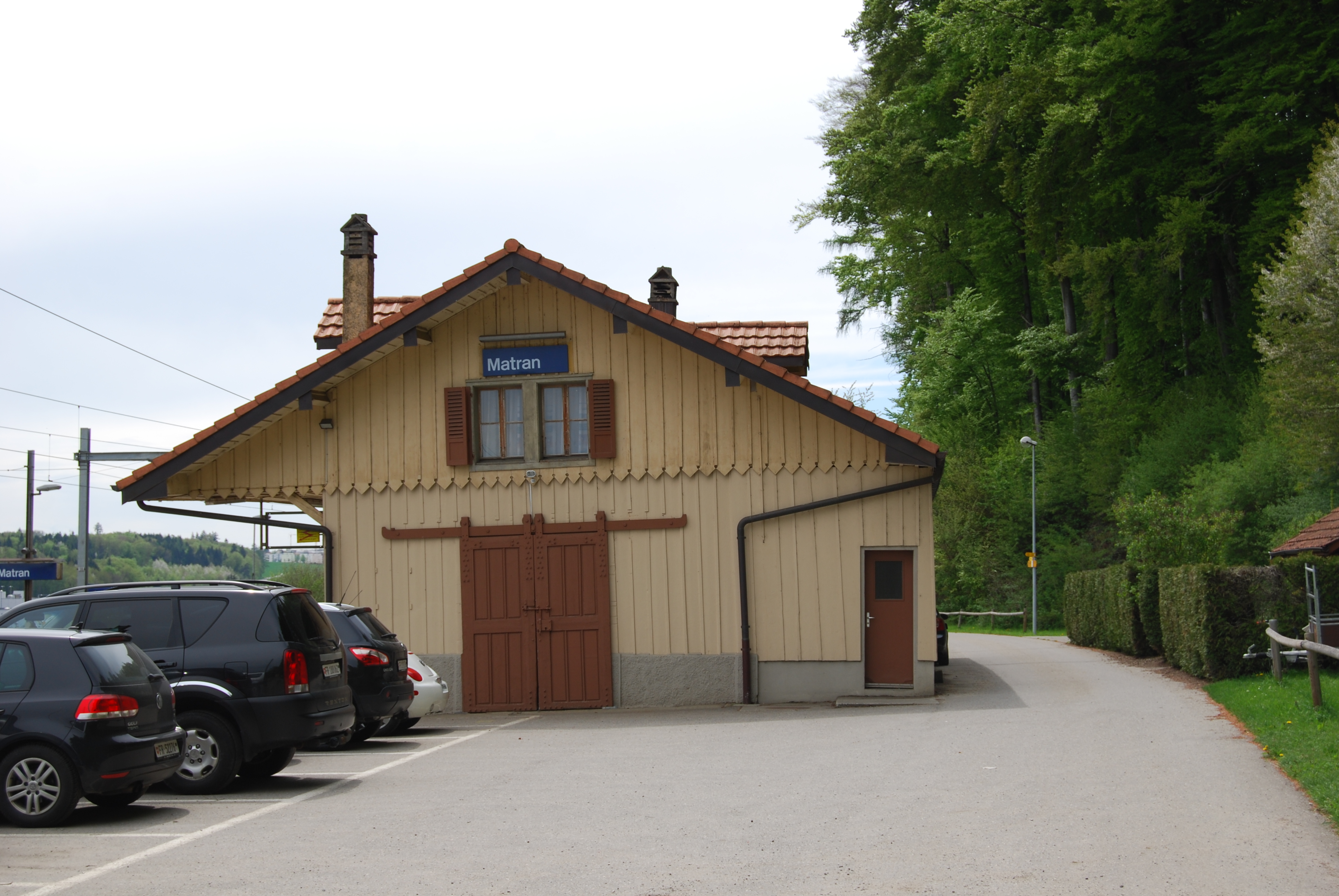
- The station building in 2013

General information
- Location: Matran; Switzerland
- Coordinates: 46°47′20″N 7°05′47″E
- Elevation: 642 m (2,106 ft)
- Owner: Swiss Federal Railways
- Line: Lausanne–Bern line
- Distance: 60.4 km (37.5 mi) from Lausanne
- Platforms: 2 (2 side platforms)
- Tracks: 2

Construction
- Parking: Yes (7 spaces)
- Cycle facilities: Yes (15 spaces)
- Accessible: No

Other information
- Station code: 8504029 (MTR)
Location

Matran railway station (French: Gare de Matran, German: Bahnhof Matran) is a closed railway station in the municipality of Matran, in the Swiss canton of Fribourg. It is an intermediate stop on the standard gauge Lausanne–Bern line of Swiss Federal Railways. Direct rail service ended with the 2024 timetable change and was replaced with increased bus service from the village to Fribourg pending the commissioning of the new Avry-Matran station opening in December 2025.
