= Corserey =

- Former municipality
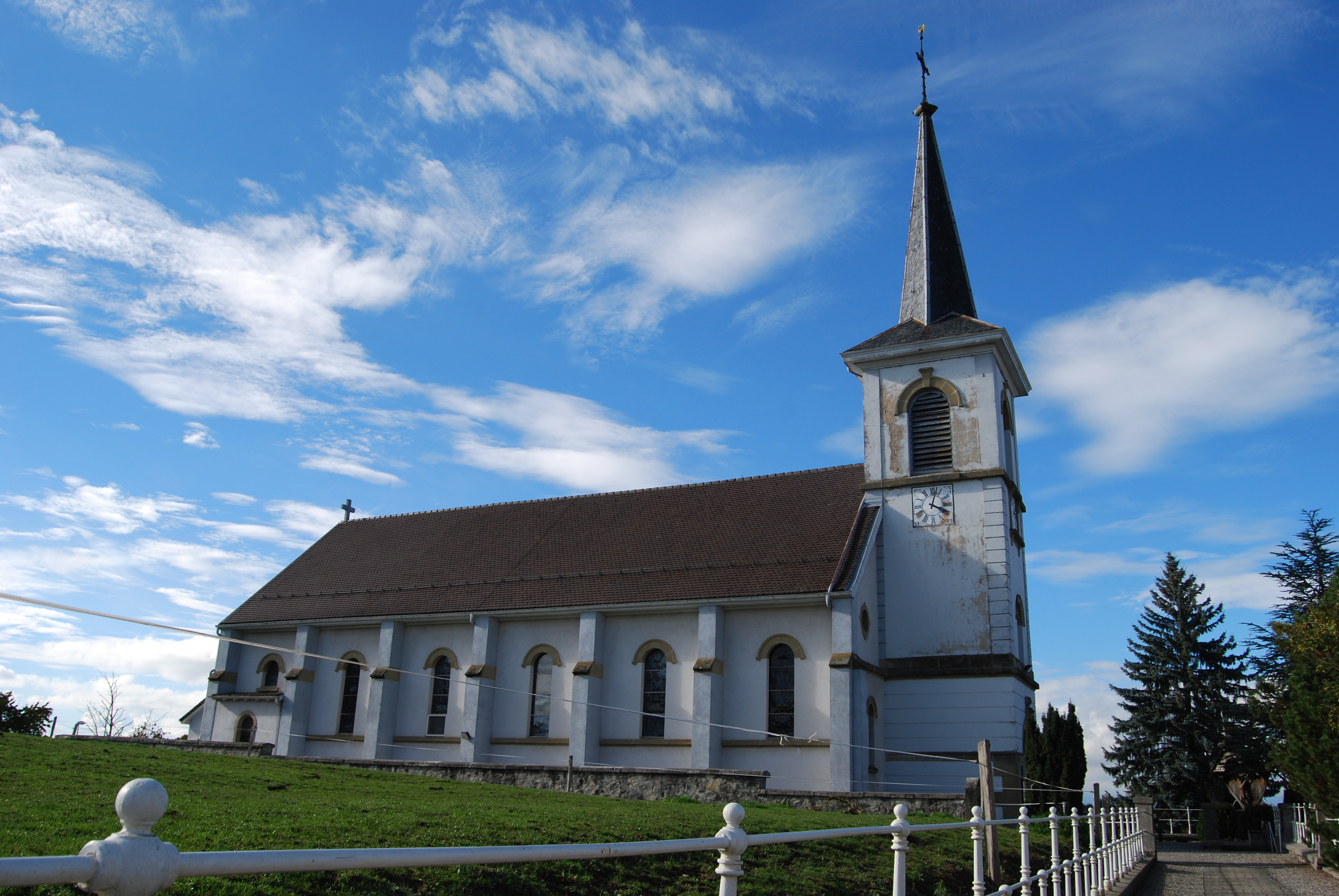

- Flag Coat of arms
- Location of Corserey
- Location within Switzerland Location within Canton of Fribourg
- Coordinates: 46°46′N 7°0′E
- Country: Switzerland
- Canton: Fribourg
- District: Sarine

Government
  - Mayor: Syndic

Area
  - Total: 3.46 km^{2} (1.34 sq mi)
- Elevation: 658 m (2,159 ft)

Population (December 2020)
  - Total: 413
  - Density: 119/km^{2} (309/sq mi)
- Time zone: UTC+01:00 (CET)
  - Summer (DST): UTC+02:00 (CEST)
- Postal code: 1747
- SFOS number: 2185
- ISO 3166 code: CH-FR
- Surrounded by: La Brillaz, Montagny, Prez-vers-Noréaz, Torny
- Website: corserey.ch

Corserey (French: [kɔʁsəʁɛ]; Arpitan: Corserê, locally Korchèrê [kɔʁʃɛˈʁɛ]) is a former municipality in the district of Sarine in the canton of Fribourg in Switzerland. On 1 January 2020, the former municipalities of Corserey, Noréaz, and Prez-vers-Noréaz merged to form the new municipality of Prez.

== History ==
Corserey is first mentioned around 1150-62 as Corserei.

== Geography ==
Aerial view (1964)

As of 2013, Corserey has an area of 3.43 square kilometers (1.32 mi^{2}). Of this area, 2.47 km^{2} (0.95 mi^{2}) or 72.0% is used for agricultural purposes, while 0.67 km^{2} (0.26 mi^{2}) or 19.5% is forested. Of the rest of the land, 0.27 km^{2} (0.10 mi^{2}) or 7.9% is settled (buildings or roads). Of the built up area, housing and buildings made up 5.2% and transportation infrastructure made up 2.0%. Out of the forested land, 98.5% of the forested land area is covered with heavy forests. Of the agricultural land, 47.5% is used for growing crops and 23.3% is pastures, while 1.2% is used for orchards or vine crops.

The municipality is located in the Sarine district.

== Coat of arms ==
The blazon of the municipal coat of arms is Quartered Gules and Azure.

== Demographics ==
Corserey has a population (as of December 2020) of 413. As of 2008, 2.8% of the population are resident foreign nationals. Over the last 10 years (2000–2010), the population has changed at a rate of 13.5%. Migration accounted for 4.3%, while births and deaths accounted for 7.8%.

Most of the population (as of 2000) speaks French (254 or 96.9%) as their first language, German is the second most common (4 or 1.5%), and Italian is the third (3 or 1.1%).

As of 2008, the population was 49.5% male and 50.5% female. The population was made up of 151 Swiss men (47.9% of the population) and 5 (1.6%) non-Swiss men. There were 155 Swiss women (49.2%) and 4 (1.3%) non-Swiss women. Of the population in the municipality, 104 or about 39.7% were born in Corserey and lived there in 2000. There were 107 or 40.8% who were born in the same canton, while 36 or 13.7% were born somewhere else in Switzerland, and 14 or 5.3% were born outside of Switzerland.

As of 2000, children and teenagers (0–19 years old) make up 29% of the population, while adults (20–64 years old) make up 61.8%, and seniors (over 64 years old) make up 9.2%.

As of 2000, there were 118 people who were single and never married in the municipality. There were 127 married individuals, 7 widows or widowers, and 10 individuals who were divorced.

As of 2000, there were 87 private households in the municipality, and an average of 3. persons per household. There were 13 households that consist of only one person and 12 households with five or more people. In 2000, a total of 84 apartments (90.3% of the total) were permanently occupied, while 7 apartments (7.5%) were seasonally occupied and 2 apartments (2.2%) were empty. As of 2009, the construction rate of new housing units was 15.7 new units per 1,000 residents. In 2010, the vacancy rate for the municipality was 3.01%.

The historical population is given in the following chart:

== Politics ==
In the 2011 federal election, the most popular party was the Social Democratic Party of Switzerland (SPS), which received 29.2% of the vote. The next three most popular parties were the Swiss People's Party (SVP, 22.1%), the Christian Democratic People's Party of Switzerland (CVP, 21.4%), and the FDP (10.2%).

The SPS received about the same percentage of the vote as they did in the 2007 Federal election (28.1% in 2007 vs 29.2% in 2011). The SVP moved from third in 2007 (with 18.6%) to second in 2011, the CVP moved from second in 2007 (with 24.6%) to third, and the FDP moved from below fourth place in 2007 to fourth. A total of 112 votes were cast in this election.

== Economy ==
As of 2010, Corserey had an unemployment rate of 1.5%. As of 2008, there were 33 people employed in the primary economic sector and about 9 businesses involved in this sector. 6 people were employed in the secondary sector, and there were 4 businesses in this sector. 26 people were employed in the tertiary sector, with 10 businesses in this sector. There were 132 residents of the municipality who were employed in some capacity, of which females made up 41.7% of the workforce.

In 2008, the total number of full-time equivalent jobs was 56. The number of jobs in the primary sector was 27, all of which were in agriculture. The number of jobs in the secondary sector was 6 of which 1 was in manufacturing and 5 (83.3%) were in construction. The number of jobs in the tertiary sector was 23. In the tertiary sector; 1 was in the sale or repair of motor vehicles, 3 or 13.0% were in a hotel or restaurant, 3 or 13.0% were in the information industry, 2 or 8.7% were technical professionals or scientists, 5 or 21.7% were in education.

In 2000, there were 6 workers who commuted into the municipality and 87 workers who commuted away. The municipality is a net exporter of workers, with about 14.5 workers leaving the municipality for every one entering. Of the working population, 3.8% used public transportation to get to work, and 64.4% used a private car.

== Religion ==
From the 2000 census, 227 or 86.6% were Roman Catholic, while 13 or 5.0% belonged to the Swiss Reformed Church. Of the rest of the population, there were 2 members of an Orthodox church (or about 0.76% of the population), and there were 12 individuals (or about 4.58% of the population) who belonged to another Christian church. 9 (or about 3.44% of the population) belonged to no church, are agnostic or atheist, and 5 individuals (or about 1.91% of the population) did not answer the question.

== Education ==
In Corserey, about 96 or (36.6%) of the population have completed non-mandatory upper secondary education, and 29 or (11.1%) have completed additional higher education (either university or a Fachhochschule). Of the 29 who completed tertiary schooling, 65.5% were Swiss men, and 24.1% were Swiss women.

The Canton of Fribourg school system provides one year of non-obligatory Kindergarten, followed by six years of Primary school. This is followed by three years of obligatory lower Secondary school where the students are separated according to ability and aptitude. Following the lower Secondary, students may attend a three or four year optional upper Secondary school. The upper Secondary school is divided into gymnasium (university preparatory) and vocational programs. After they finish the upper Secondary program, students may choose to attend a Tertiary school or continue their apprenticeship.

During the 2010–11 school year, there were a total of 63 students attending 4 classes in Corserey. A total of 58 students from the municipality attended any school, either in the municipality or outside of it. There were no kindergarten classes in the municipality, but 5 students attended kindergarten in a neighboring municipality. The municipality had 4 primary classes and 63 students. During the same year, there were no lower secondary classes in the municipality, but 10 students attended lower secondary school in a neighboring municipality. There were no upper Secondary classes or vocational classes, but there were 4 upper Secondary students and 7 upper Secondary vocational students who attended classes in another municipality. The municipality had no non-university Tertiary classes, but there was one non-university Tertiary student who attended classes in another municipality.

As of 2000, there were 33 students in Corserey who came from another municipality, while 41 residents attended schools outside the municipality.
