= Rosé railway station =

Railway station in Avry, Switzerland

Rosé
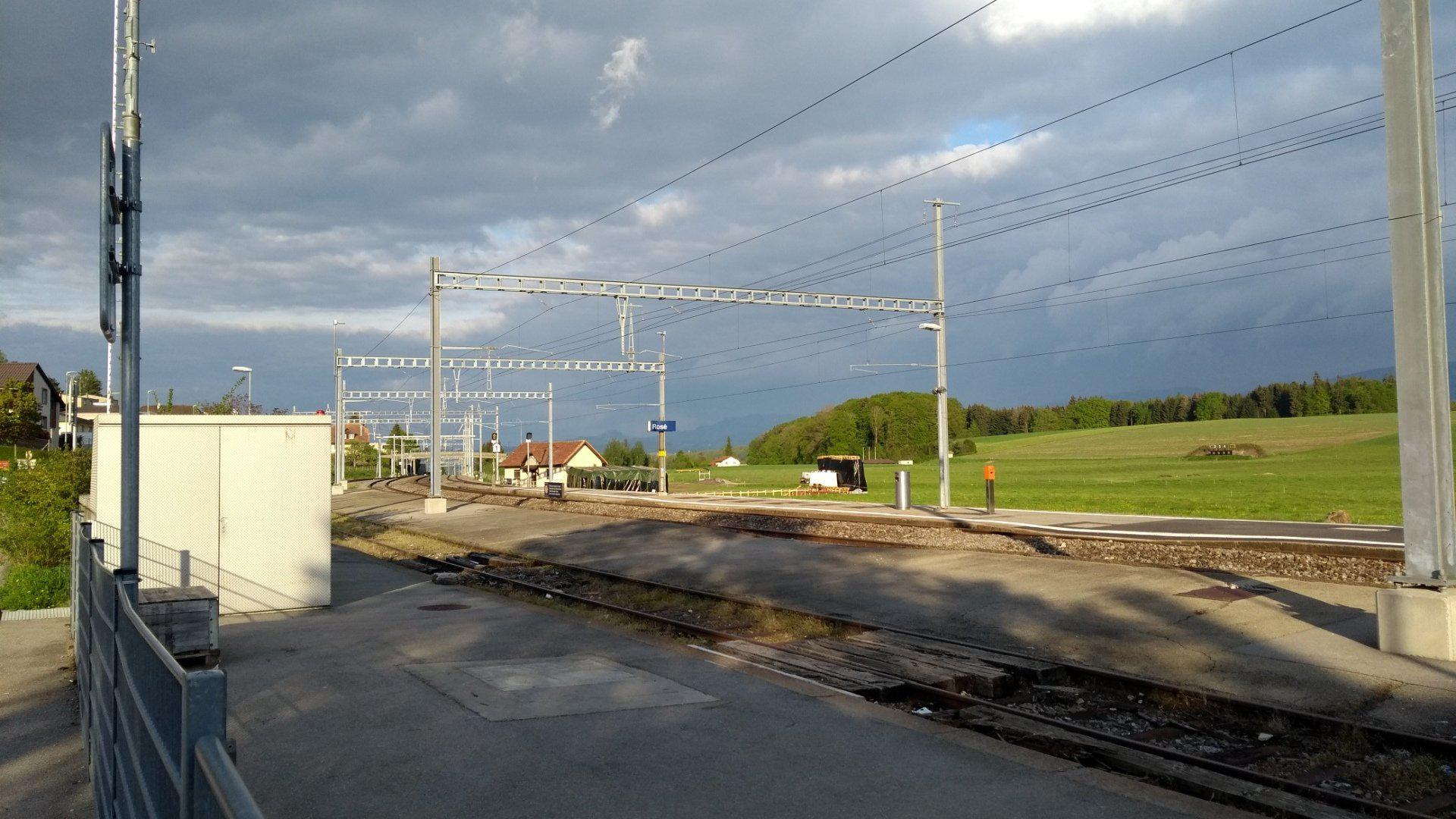
- The station in 2019

General information
- Location: Avry; Switzerland
- Coordinates: 46°46′57″N 7°03′43″E
- Elevation: 667 m (2,188 ft)
- Owner: Swiss Federal Railways
- Distance: 57.5 km (35.7 mi) from Lausanne
- Platforms: 2 (1 island platform)
- Tracks: 4
- Connections: Transports publics Fribourgeois bus line 11

Construction
- Parking: Yes (15 spaces)
- Cycle facilities: Yes (8 spaces)
- Accessible: No

Other information
- Station code: 8504028 (ROS)
- Fare zone: 11 and 35 (frimobil)

Passengers
- 2018: 920 per weekday (SBB)
Location

Rosé railway station (French: Gare de Rosé, German: Bahnhof Rosé) is a now closed railway station in the municipality of Avry, in the Swiss canton of Fribourg. It was an intermediate stop on the standard gauge Lausanne–Bern line of Swiss Federal Railways and was served by S40 and S41 of RER Fribourg. The station was closed with the December 2025 timetable change and has been replaced by a new station called Avry-Matran. Buses continue to stop at Rosé station.
