= Chésopelloz =

- Former municipality
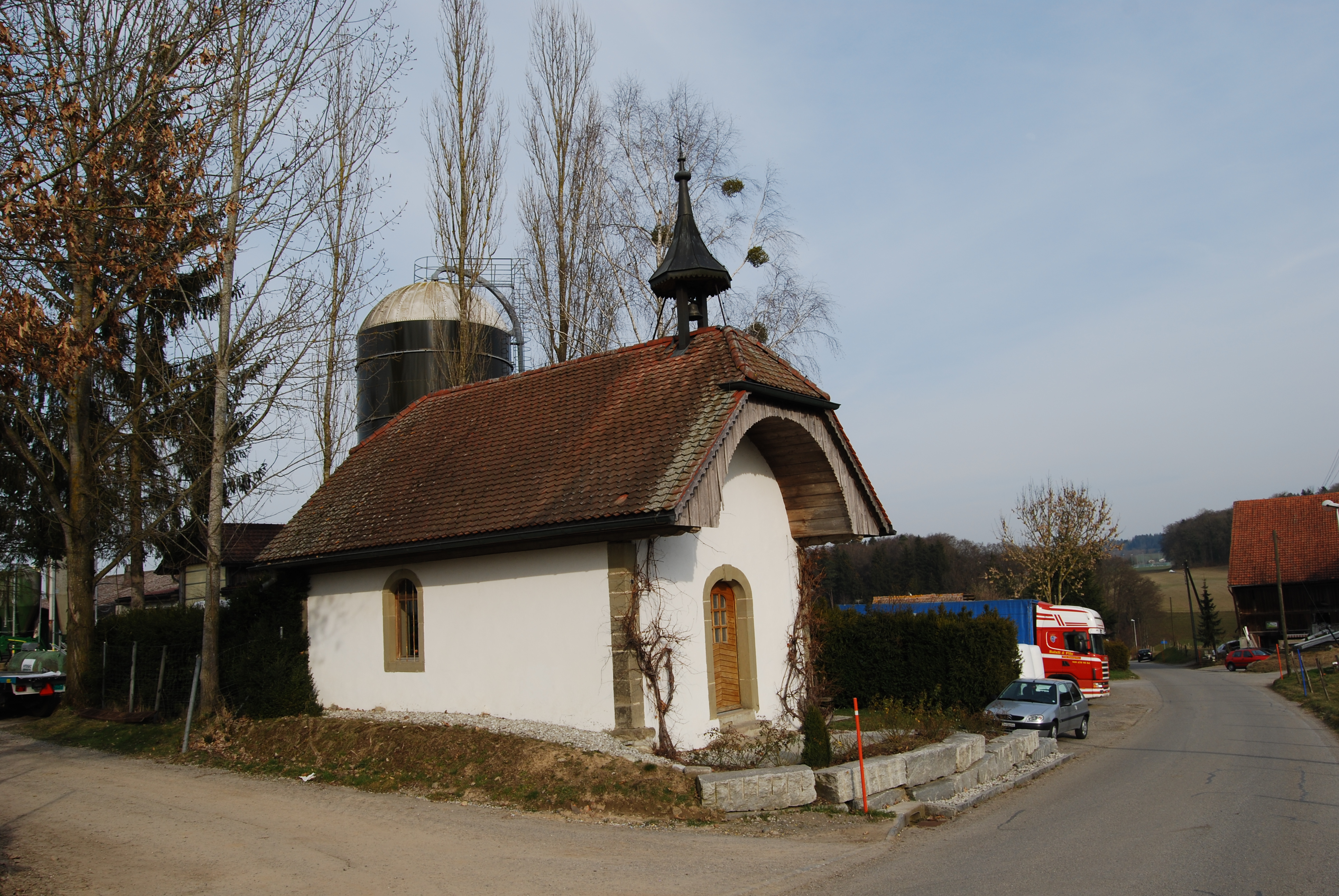

- Coat of arms
- Location of Chésopelloz
- Location within Switzerland Location within Canton of Fribourg
- Coordinates: 46°48′N 7°5′E
- Country: Switzerland
- Canton: Fribourg
- District: Sarine

Government
  - Mayor: Syndic

Area
  - Total: 1.67 km^{2} (0.64 sq mi)
- Elevation: 620 m (2,030 ft)

Population (Dec 2015)
  - Total: 123
  - Density: 73.7/km^{2} (191/sq mi)
- Time zone: UTC+01:00 (CET)
  - Summer (DST): UTC+02:00 (CEST)
- Postal code: 1720
- SFOS number: 2179
- ISO 3166 code: CH-FR
- Surrounded by: Autafond, Avry, Belfaux, Corminboeuf, Noréaz, Ponthaux
- Website: SFSO statistics

Chésopelloz (French: [ʃezopɛlo]; Arpitan: Chesâlpèlo, locally Tsèjopèlou [tsɛʒoˈpɛlu]) is a former municipality in the district of Sarine in the canton of Fribourg in Switzerland. The municipality of Chésopelloz on 1 January 2017 merged into Corminboeuf.

== History ==
Chésopelloz is first mentioned in 1229 as Chissapenlo.

== Geography ==
Chésopelloz had an area, as of 2009, of 1.6 square kilometers (0.62 mi^{2}). Of this area, 1.11 km^{2} (0.43 mi^{2}) or 68.5% is used for agricultural purposes, while 0.43 km^{2} (0.17 mi^{2}) or 26.5% is forested. Of the rest of the land, 0.11 km^{2} (27 acres) or 6.8% is settled (buildings or roads), 0.01 km^{2} (2.5 acres) or 0.6% is either rivers or lakes.

Of the built up area, housing and buildings made up 3.7% and transportation infrastructure made up 1.9%. while parks, green belts and sports fields made up 1.2%. Out of the forested land, 25.3% of the total land area is heavily forested and 1.2% is covered with orchards or small clusters of trees. Of the agricultural land, 39.5% is used for growing crops and 25.9% is pastures, while 3.1% is used for orchards or vine crops. All the water in the municipality is flowing water.

The former municipality is located in the Sarine district. It consists of three hamlets.

== Coat of arms ==
The blazon of the municipal coat of arms is Per fess Azure a Rooster passant Or crested and jellopped Gules and Or three Roses Gules barbed and seeded proper.

== Demographics ==
Chésopelloz had a population (as of 2015) of 123. As of 2008, 10.8% of the population are resident foreign nationals. Over the last 10 years (2000–2010) the population has changed at a rate of 9.6%. Migration accounted for 5.3%, while births and deaths accounted for 5.3%.

Most of the population (as of 2000) speaks French (90 or 82.6%) as their first language, German is the second most common (15 or 13.8%) and Italian is the third (2 or 1.8%).

As of 2008, the population was 53.9% male and 46.1% female. The population was made up of 62 Swiss men (48.4% of the population) and 7 (5.5%) non-Swiss men. There were 52 Swiss women (40.6%) and 7 (5.5%) non-Swiss women. Of the population in the municipality, 25 or about 22.9% were born in Chésopelloz and lived there in 2000. There were 54 or 49.5% who were born in the same canton, while 16 or 14.7% were born somewhere else in Switzerland, and 14 or 12.8% were born outside of Switzerland.

As of 2000, children and teenagers (0–19 years old) make up 31.2% of the population, while adults (20–64 years old) make up 56% and seniors (over 64 years old) make up 12.8%.

As of 2000, there were 45 people who were single and never married in the municipality. There were 57 married individuals, 3 widows or widowers and 4 individuals who are divorced.

As of 2000, there were 37 private households in the municipality, and an average of 2.9 persons per household. There were 6 households that consist of only one person and 6 households with five or more people. In 2000, a total of 37 apartments (88.1% of the total) were permanently occupied, while 1 apartment was seasonally occupied and 4 apartments (9.5%) were empty. As of 2009, the construction rate of new housing units was 8 new units per 1000 residents.

The historical population is given in the following chart:

== Politics ==
In the 2011 federal election the most popular party was the SPS which received 36.7% of the vote. The next three most popular parties were the CVP (24.3%), the SVP (18.8%) and the FDP (9.6%).

The SPS improved their position in Chésopelloz rising to first, from third in 2007 (with 17.7%) The CVP retained about the same popularity (22.3% in 2007), the SVP moved from first in 2007 (with 37.4%) to third and the FDP retained about the same popularity (8.9% in 2007). A total of 36 votes were cast in this election, of which 4 or 11.1% were invalid.

== Economy ==
As of 2010, Chésopelloz had an unemployment rate of 1.6%. As of 2008, there were 24 people employed in the primary economic sector and about 8 businesses involved in this sector. 4 people were employed in the secondary sector and there was 1 business in this sector. 5 people were employed in the tertiary sector, with 3 businesses in this sector. There were 58 residents of the municipality who were employed in some capacity, of which females made up 36.2% of the workforce.

In 2008 the total number of full-time equivalent jobs was 27. The number of jobs in the primary sector was 18, all of which were in agriculture. The number of jobs in the secondary sector was 4, all of which were in manufacturing. The number of jobs in the tertiary sector was 5. In the tertiary sector; 1 was in the sale or repair of motor vehicles and 1 was a technical professional or scientist.

In 2000, there were 27 workers who commuted into the municipality and 27 workers who commuted away. The municipality is a net exporter of workers, with about 1.0 workers leaving the municipality for every one entering. Of the working population, 8.6% used public transportation to get to work, and 39.7% used a private car.

== Religion ==
From the 2000 census, 83 or 76.1% were Roman Catholic, while 12 or 11.0% belonged to the Swiss Reformed Church. There were 2 (or about 1.83% of the population) who were Islamic. 12 (or about 11.01% of the population) belonged to no church, are agnostic or atheist.

== Education ==
In Chésopelloz about 35 or (32.1%) of the population have completed non-mandatory upper secondary education, and 18 or (16.5%) have completed additional higher education (either university or a Fachhochschule). Of the 18 who completed tertiary schooling, 77.8% were Swiss men, 16.7% were Swiss women.

The Canton of Fribourg school system provides one year of non-obligatory Kindergarten, followed by six years of Primary school. This is followed by three years of obligatory lower Secondary school where the students are separated according to ability and aptitude. Following the lower Secondary students may attend a three or four year optional upper Secondary school. The upper Secondary school is divided into gymnasium (university preparatory) and vocational programs. After they finish the upper Secondary program, students may choose to attend a Tertiary school or continue their apprenticeship.

During the 2010–11 school year, there were no students attending school in Chésopelloz, but a total of 19 students attended school in other municipalities. Of these students, one was in kindergarten, 6 were in a primary school, 4 were in a mandatory secondary school, 2 were in an upper secondary school and 4 were in a vocational secondary program. There were a total of 2 tertiary students from Chésopelloz.

As of 2000, there were 26 students from Chésopelloz who attended schools outside the municipality.
