= La Brillaz =

- Municipality
- Flag Coat of arms
- Location of La Brillaz
- Location within Switzerland Location within Canton of Fribourg
- Coordinates: 46°46′N 7°0′E
- Country: Switzerland
- Canton: Fribourg
- District: Sarine

Government
  - Mayor: Syndic

Area
  - Total: 10.26 km^{2} (3.96 sq mi)
- Elevation: 720 m (2,360 ft)

Population (December 2020)
  - Total: 2,080
  - Density: 203/km^{2} (525/sq mi)
- Time zone: UTC+01:00 (CET)
  - Summer (DST): UTC+02:00 (CEST)
- Postal codes: 1745 Lentigny; 1756 Lovens; 1756 Onnens
- SFOS number: 2234
- ISO 3166 code: CH-FR
- Surrounded by: Autigny, Avry, Chénens, Corserey, Cottens, La Folliaz, Neyruz, Prez-vers-Noréaz, Torny
- Website: labrillaz.ch

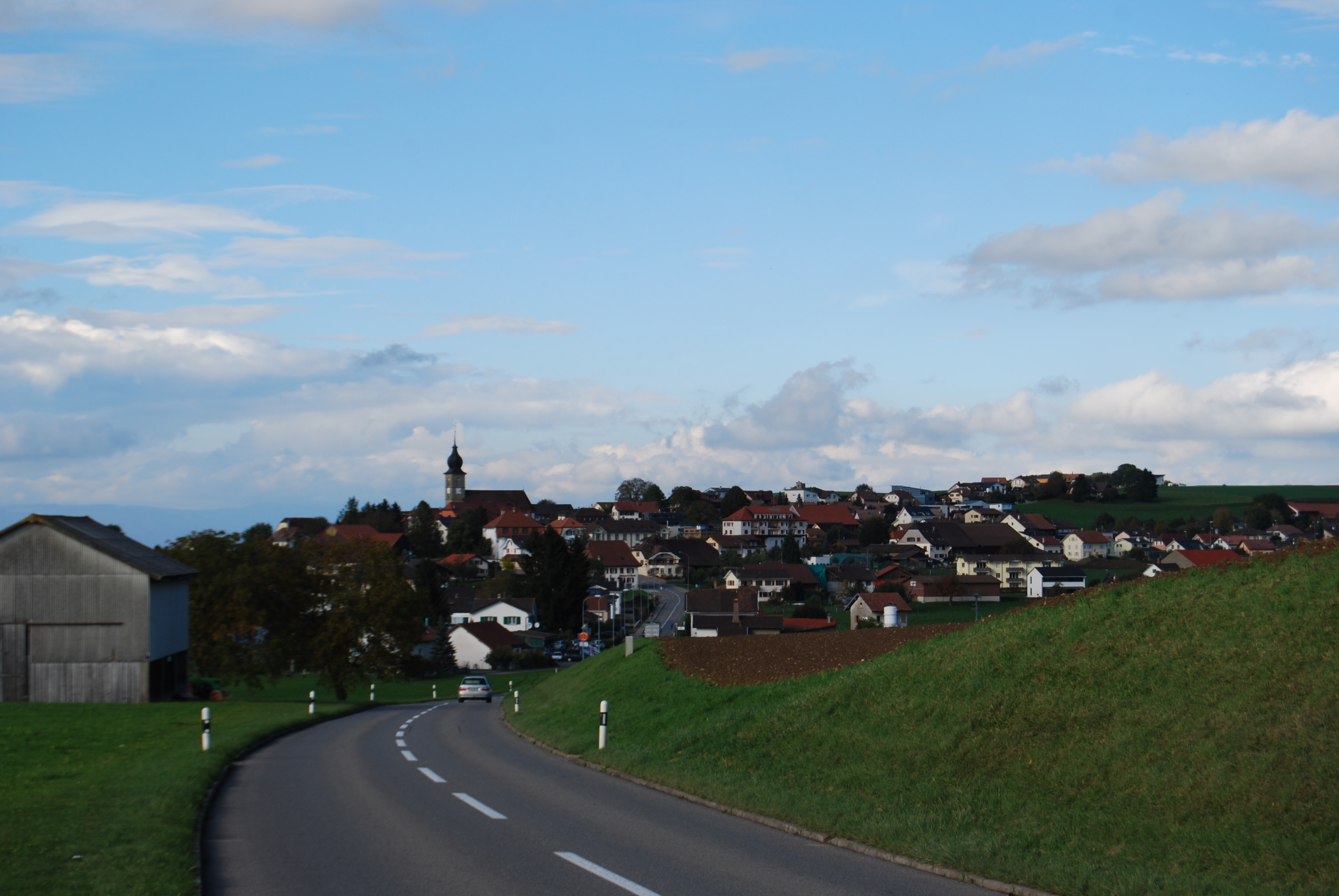

La Brillaz is a municipality in the district of Sarine in the canton of Fribourg in Switzerland. It was created from the 2001 union of Lentigny, Lovens, and Onnens.

== Geography ==
La Brillaz has an area, as of 2009, of 10.3 square kilometers (4.0 mi^{2}). Of this area, 7.3 km^{2} (2.8 mi^{2}) or 70.9% is used for agricultural purposes, while 1.97 km^{2} (0.76 mi^{2}) or 19.1% is forested. Of the rest of the land, 0.87 km^{2} (0.34 mi^{2}) or 8.5% is settled (buildings or roads), 0.03 km^{2} (7.4 acres) or 0.3% is either rivers or lakes and 0.09 km^{2} (22 acres) or 0.9% is unproductive land.

Of the built up area, housing and buildings made up 5.6% and transportation infrastructure made up 1.7%. Out of the forested land, all of the forested land area is covered with heavy forests. Of the agricultural land, 54.6% is used for growing crops and 15.2% is pastures, while 1.2% is used for orchards or vine crops. All the water in the municipality is in lakes.

The municipality is located in the Sarine district.

== Coat of arms ==
The blazon of the municipal coat of arms is Per fess Argent a Saltire Sable and pally of six Argent and Gules. The current coat of arms includes elements from all three former municipalities.

== Demographics ==
La Brillaz has a population (as of December 2020) of 2,080. As of 2008, 8.5% of the population are resident foreign nationals. Over the last 10 years (2000–2010) the population has changed at a rate of 33.7%. Migration accounted for 22.1%, while births and deaths accounted for 10.4%.

Most of the population (as of 2000) speaks French (93.3%) as their first language, German is the second most common (4.2%) and Danish is the third (0.7%).

As of 2008, the population was 50.6% male and 49.4% female. The population was made up of 778 Swiss men (45.5% of the population) and 88 (5.1%) non-Swiss men. There were 775 Swiss women (45.3%) and 70 (4.1%) non-Swiss women.

As of 2000, children and teenagers (0–19 years old) make up 27.9% of the population, while adults (20–64 years old) make up 62.6% and seniors (over 64 years old) make up 9.4%.

As of 2009, the construction rate of new housing units was 7.1 new units per 1000 residents.

== Politics ==
In the 2011 federal election the most popular party was the SPS which received 28.1% of the vote. The next three most popular parties were the CVP (21.3%), the SVP (18.8%) and the FDP (13.3%).

The SPS received about the same percentage of the vote as they did in the 2007 Federal election (28.4% in 2007 vs 28.1% in 2011). The CVP retained about the same popularity (25.7% in 2007), the SVP retained about the same popularity (20.0% in 2007) and the FDP retained about the same popularity (13.1% in 2007). A total of 542 votes were cast in this election, of which 9 or 1.7% were invalid.

== Economy ==
As of 2010, La Brillaz had an unemployment rate of 2.5%. As of 2008, there were 63 people employed in the primary economic sector and about 22 businesses involved in this sector. 46 people were employed in the secondary sector and there were 8 businesses in this sector. 92 people were employed in the tertiary sector, with 23 businesses in this sector. There were residents of the municipality who were employed in some capacity.

In 2008 the total number of full-time equivalent jobs was 167. The number of jobs in the primary sector was 51, of which 45 were in agriculture and 6 were in forestry or lumber production. The number of jobs in the secondary sector was 44 of which 8 or (18.2%) were in manufacturing and 36 (81.8%) were in construction. The number of jobs in the tertiary sector was 72. In the tertiary sector; 18 or 25.0% were in wholesale or retail sales or the repair of motor vehicles, 4 or 5.6% were in the movement and storage of goods, 4 or 5.6% were in a hotel or restaurant, 9 or 12.5% were in the information industry, 4 or 5.6% were technical professionals or scientists, 7 or 9.7% were in education.

Of the working population, 6.5% used public transportation to get to work, and 77.1% used a private car.

== Education ==
The Canton of Fribourg school system provides one year of non-obligatory Kindergarten, followed by six years of Primary school. This is followed by three years of obligatory lower Secondary school where the students are separated according to ability and aptitude. Following the lower Secondary students may attend a three or four year optional upper Secondary school. The upper Secondary school is divided into gymnasium (university preparatory) and vocational programs. After they finish the upper Secondary program, students may choose to attend a Tertiary school or continue their apprenticeship.

During the 2010–11 school year, there were a total of 165 students attending 8 classes in La Brillaz. A total of 368 students from the municipality attended any school, either in the municipality or outside of it. There were 2 kindergarten classes with a total of 36 students in the municipality. The municipality had 6 primary classes and 129 students. During the same year, there were no lower secondary classes in the municipality, but 72 students attended lower secondary school in a neighboring municipality. There were no upper Secondary classes or vocational classes, but there were 48 upper Secondary students and 47 upper Secondary vocational students who attended classes in another municipality. The municipality had no non-university Tertiary classes, but there were 3 non-university Tertiary students and 4 specialized Tertiary students who attended classes in another municipality.
