= Avry =

- Municipality
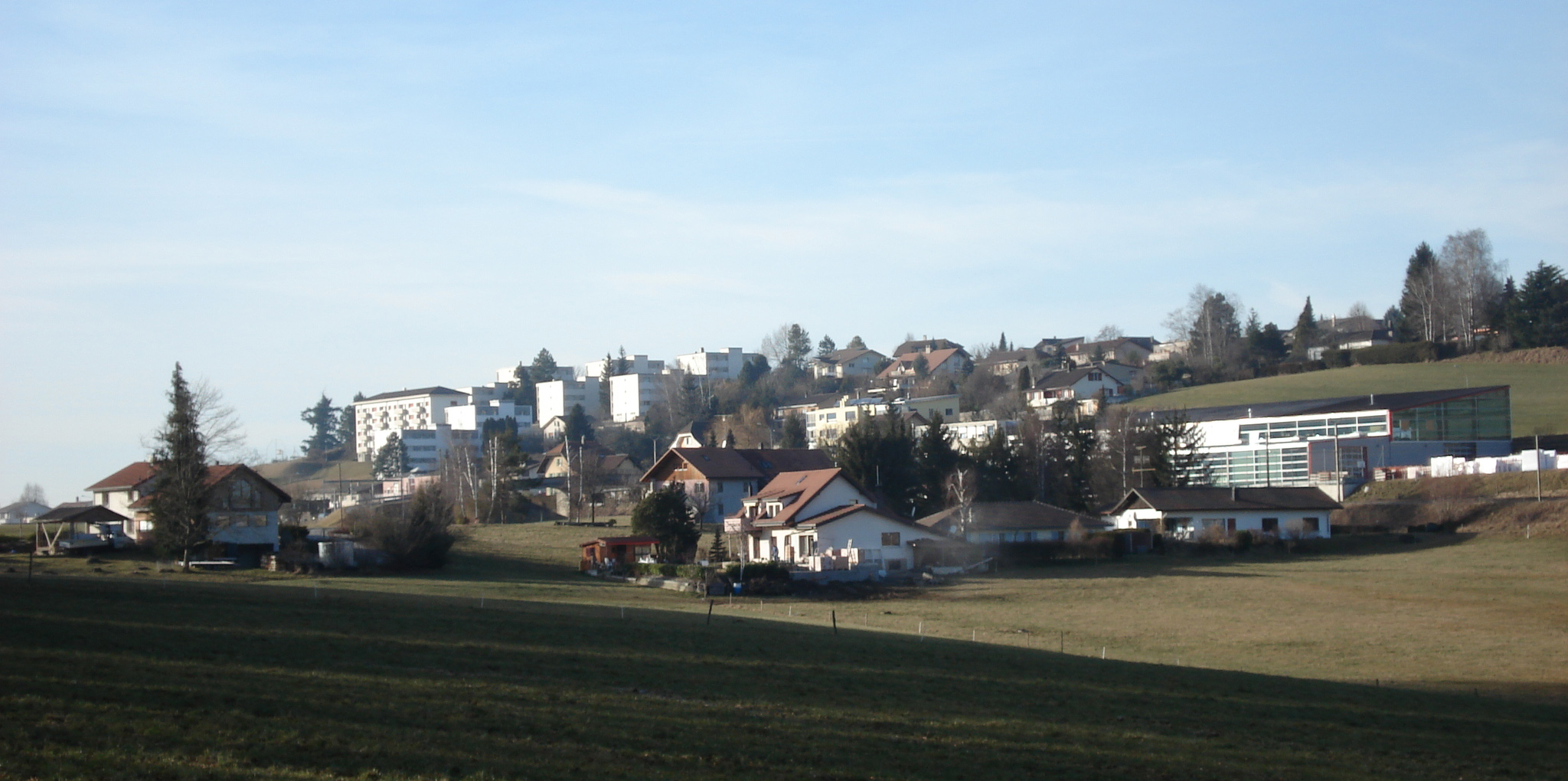
- Praly section of Avry

- Flag Coat of arms
- Location of Avry
- Location within Switzerland Location within Canton of Fribourg
- Coordinates: 46°47′N 7°4′E
- Country: Switzerland
- Canton: Fribourg
- District: Sarine

Government
  - Mayor: Syndic

Area
  - Total: 5.81 km^{2} (2.24 sq mi)
- Elevation: 679 m (2,228 ft)
- Highest elevation: 710 m (2,330 ft)
- Lowest elevation: 603 m (1,978 ft)

Population (December 2020)
  - Total: 1,911
  - Density: 329/km^{2} (852/sq mi)
- Time zone: UTC+01:00 (CET)
  - Summer (DST): UTC+02:00 (CEST)
- Postal code: 1754
- SFOS number: 2174
- ISO 3166 code: CH-FR
- Localities: Avry-Centre, Avry-Bourg, Rosé, Corjolens
- Surrounded by: Chésopelloz, Corminboeuf, La Brillaz, Matran, Neyruz, Noréaz, Prez-vers-Noréaz
- Website: avry.ch

Avry (Arpitan: Avri) is a municipality in the district of Sarine in the canton of Fribourg in Switzerland. The municipality is the result of the 1 January 2001 union of Avry-sur-Matran and Corjolens.

== Geography ==
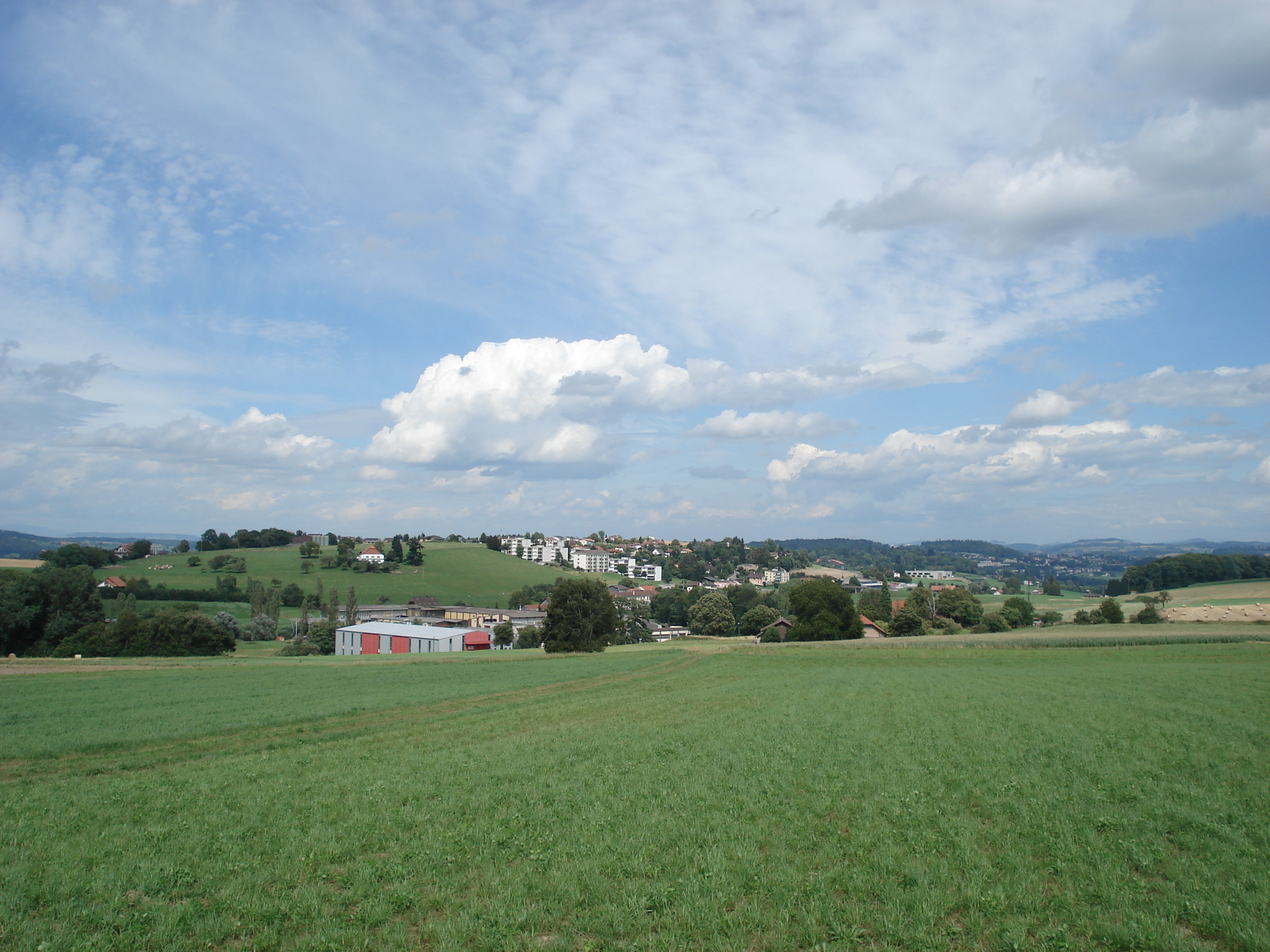
Avry

Aerial view (1964)

Avry has an area, as of 2009, of 5.8 square kilometers (2.2 mi^{2}). Of this area, 4.21 km^{2} (1.63 mi^{2}) or 72.2% is used for agricultural purposes, while 0.67 km^{2} (0.26 mi^{2}) or 11.5% is forested. Of the rest of the land, 0.92 km^{2} (0.36 mi^{2}) or 15.8% is settled (buildings or roads) and 0.01 km^{2} (2.5 acres) or 0.2% is unproductive land.

Of the built up area, industrial buildings made up 1.7% of the total area while housing and buildings made up 8.4% and transportation infrastructure made up 5.0%. Out of the forested land, all of the forested land area is covered with heavy forests. Of the agricultural land, 53.7% is used for growing crops and 17.8% is pastures.

== Coat of arms ==
The blazon of the municipal coat of arms is Chevrony of six Argent and Sable. This coat of arms is the same as the one from the former municipality of Avry-sur-Matran.

== Demographics ==
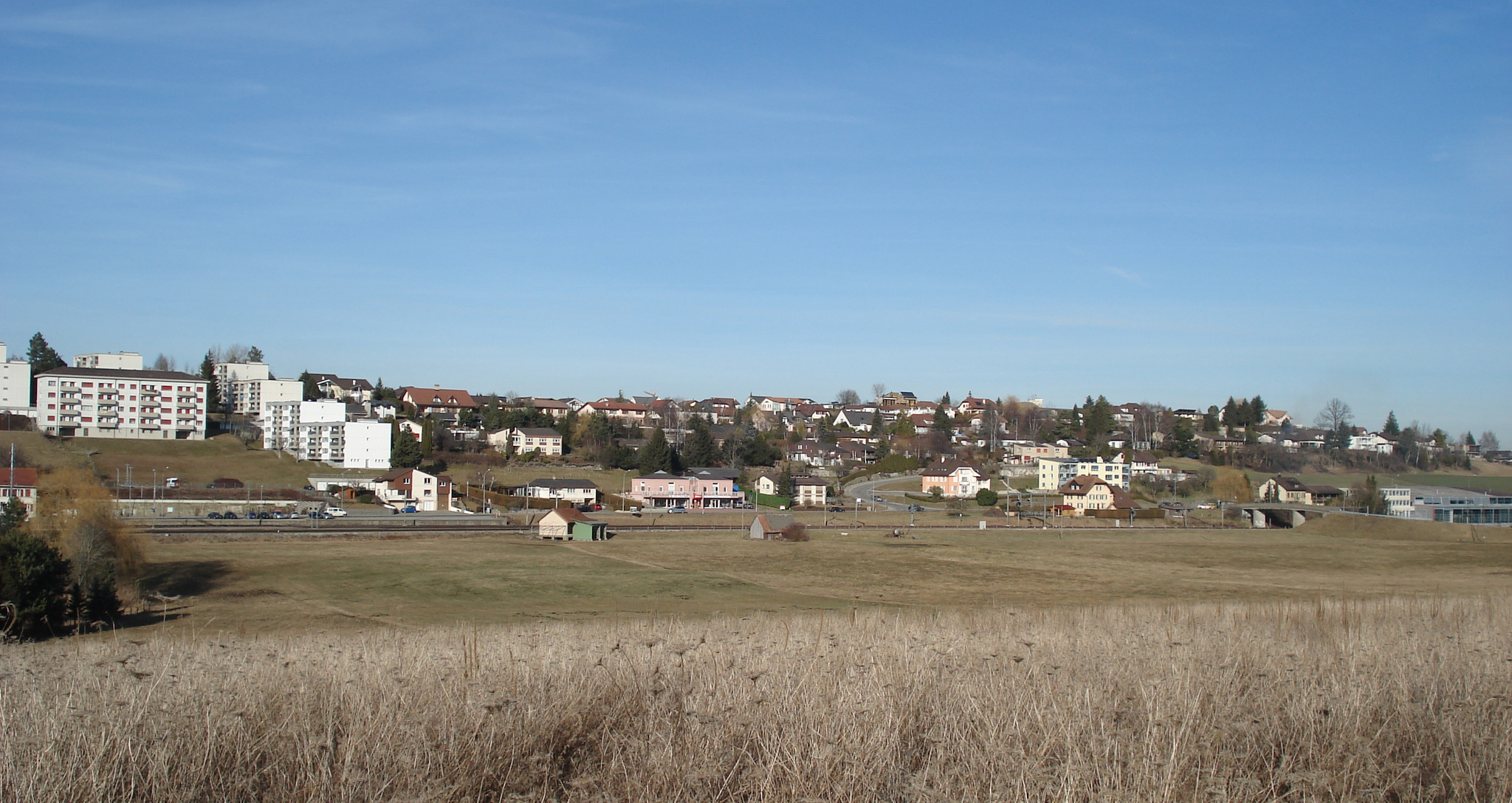
Rose section of Avry

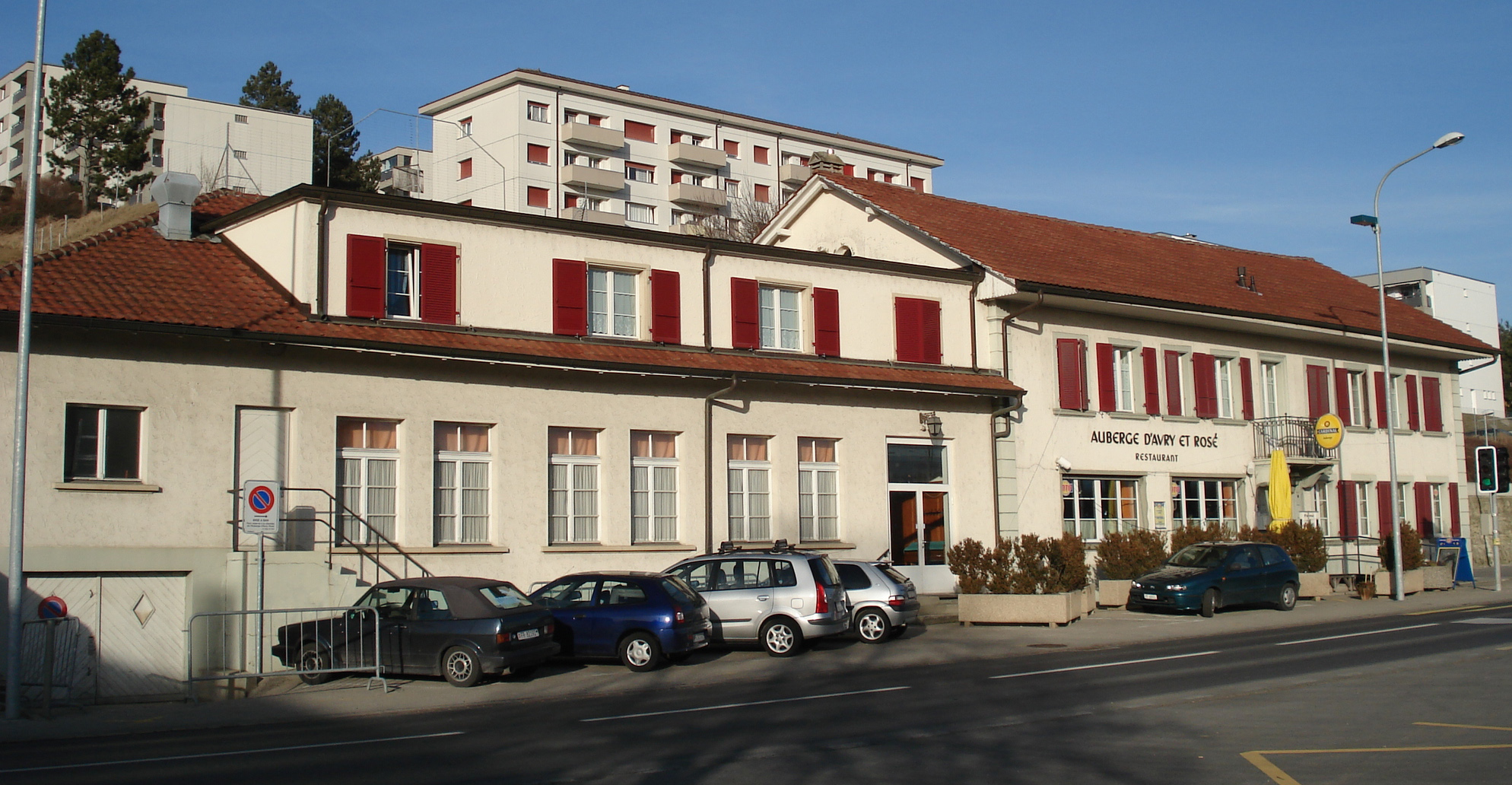
Houses in Avry

Avry has a population (as of December 2020) of 1,911. As of 2008, 13.3% of the population are resident foreign nationals. Over the last 10 years (2000–2010) the population has changed at a rate of 29.6%. Migration accounted for 22.4%, while births and deaths accounted for 7.7%.

Most of the population (as of 2000) speaks French (1,047 or 86.2%) as their first language, German is the second most common (99 or 8.1%) and Albanian is the third (13 or 1.1%). There are 12 people who speak Italian.

As of 2008, the population was 51.1% male and 48.9% female. The population was made up of 713 Swiss men (42.8% of the population) and 138 (8.3%) non-Swiss men. There were 698 Swiss women (41.9%) and 115 (6.9%) non-Swiss women. Of the population in the municipality, 251 or about 20.7% were born in Avry and lived there in 2000. There were 564 or 46.4% who were born in the same canton, while 172 or 14.2% were born somewhere else in Switzerland, and 198 or 16.3% were born outside of Switzerland.

As of 2000, children and teenagers (0–19 years old) make up 27.7% of the population, while adults (20–64 years old) make up 64.2% and seniors (over 64 years old) make up 8.1%.

As of 2000, there were 561 people who were single and never married in the municipality. There were 569 married individuals, 31 widows or widowers and 54 individuals who are divorced.

As of 2000, there were 475 private households in the municipality, and an average of 2.7 persons per household. There were 108 households that consist of only one person and 51 households with five or more people. In 2000, a total of 434 apartments (94.1% of the total) were permanently occupied, while 19 apartments (4.1%) were seasonally occupied and 8 apartments (1.7%) were empty. As of 2009, the construction rate of new housing units was 3 new units per 1000 residents. The vacancy rate for the municipality, in 2010, was 0.15%.

The historical population is given in the following chart:

== Politics ==
In the 2011 federal election the most popular party was the SP which received 26.9% of the vote. The next three most popular parties were the SVP (19.2%), the FDP (18.1%) and the CVP (14.4%).

The SPS received about the same percentage of the vote as they did in the 2007 Federal election (26.4% in 2007 vs 26.9% in 2011). The SVP moved from third in 2007 (with 18.5%) to second in 2011, the FDP moved from second in 2007 (with 23.9%) to third and the CVP retained about the same popularity (15.4% in 2007). A total of 604 votes were cast in this election, of which 9 or 1.5% were invalid.

== Economy ==
As of 2010, Avry had an unemployment rate of 2.6%. As of 2008, there were 46 people employed in the primary economic sector and about 14 businesses involved in this sector. 185 people were employed in the secondary sector and there were 17 businesses in this sector. 1,016 people were employed in the tertiary sector, with 100 businesses in this sector. There were 667 residents of the municipality who were employed in some capacity, of which females made up 43.6% of the workforce.

In 2008 the total number of full-time equivalent jobs was 964. The number of jobs in the primary sector was 36, all of which were in agriculture. The number of jobs in the secondary sector was 177 of which 90 or (50.8%) were in manufacturing and 52 (29.4%) were in construction. The number of jobs in the tertiary sector was 751. In the tertiary sector; 510 or 67.9% were in wholesale or retail sales or the repair of motor vehicles, 10 or 1.3% were in the movement and storage of goods, 72 or 9.6% were in a hotel or restaurant, 2 or 0.3% were in the information industry, 9 or 1.2% were the insurance or financial industry, 30 or 4.0% were technical professionals or scientists, 55 or 7.3% were in education and 26 or 3.5% were in health care.

In 2000, there were 841 workers who commuted into the municipality and 507 workers who commuted away. The municipality is a net importer of workers, with about 1.7 workers entering the municipality for every one leaving. Of the working population, 11.8% used public transportation to get to work, and 71.7% used a private car.

== Religion ==
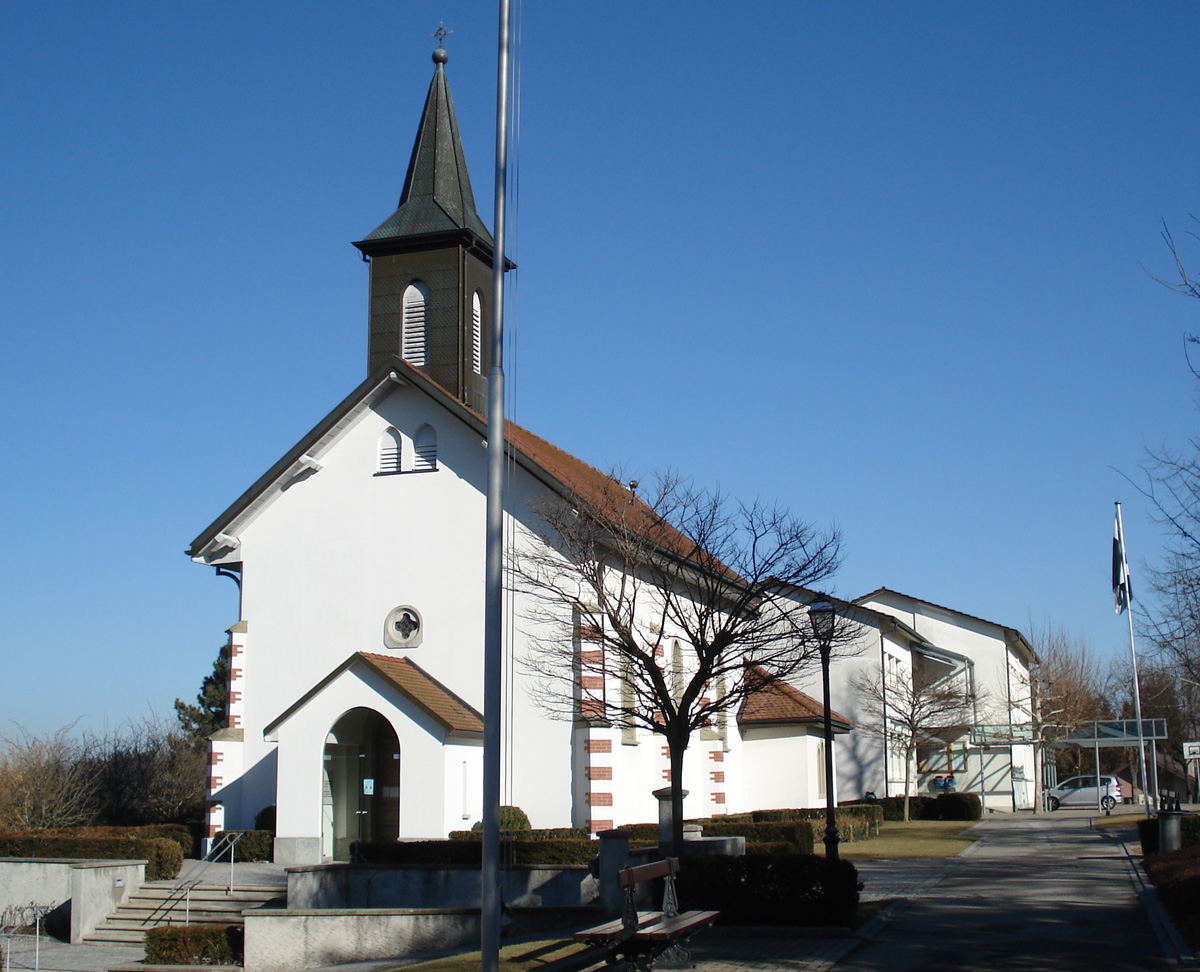
Chapel of the Holy Trinity

From the 2000 census, 918 or 75.6% were Roman Catholic, while 133 or 10.9% belonged to the Swiss Reformed Church. Of the rest of the population, there were 11 members of an Orthodox church (or about 0.91% of the population), and there were 22 individuals (or about 1.81% of the population) who belonged to another Christian church. There were 32 (or about 2.63% of the population) who were Islamic. There were 2 individuals who were Hindu and 2 individuals who belonged to another church. 69 (or about 5.68% of the population) belonged to no church, are agnostic or atheist, and 36 individuals (or about 2.96% of the population) did not answer the question.

== Education ==
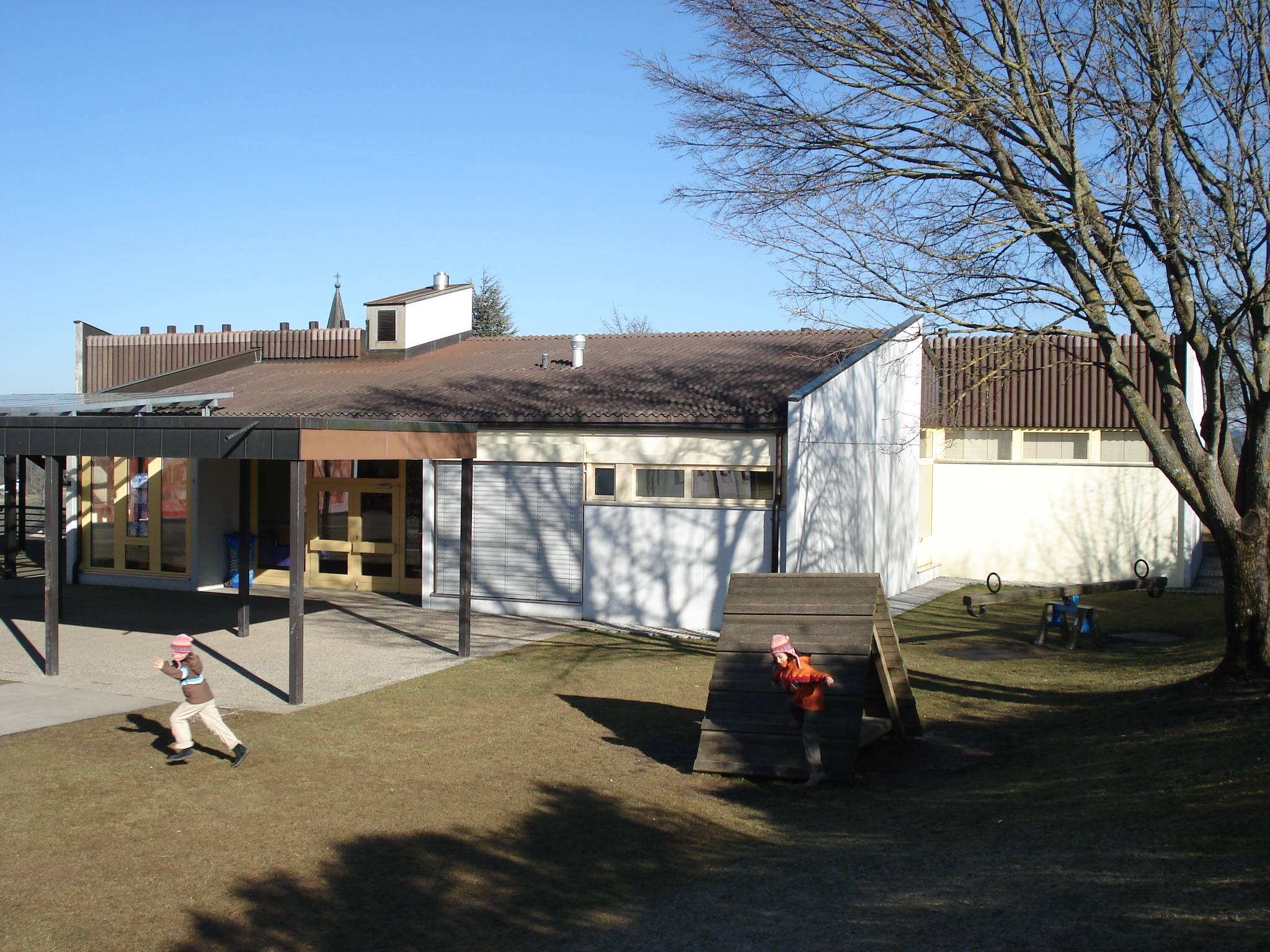
Primary School in Avry

In Avry about 394 or (32.4%) of the population have completed non-mandatory upper secondary education, and 221 or (18.2%) have completed additional higher education (either university or a Fachhochschule). Of the 221 who completed tertiary schooling, 57.9% were Swiss men, 28.1% were Swiss women, 7.2% were non-Swiss men and 6.8% were non-Swiss women.

The Canton of Fribourg school system provides one year of non-obligatory Kindergarten, followed by six years of Primary school. This is followed by three years of obligatory lower Secondary school where the students are separated according to ability and aptitude. Following the lower Secondary students may attend a three or four year optional upper Secondary school. The upper Secondary school is divided into gymnasium (university preparatory) and vocational programs. After they finish the upper Secondary program, students may choose to attend a Tertiary school or continue their apprenticeship.

During the 2010–11 school year, there were a total of 706 students attending 37 classes in Avry. A total of 342 students from the municipality attended any school, either in the municipality or outside of it. There were 2 kindergarten classes with a total of 29 students in the municipality. The municipality had 7 primary classes and 142 students. During the same year, there were 28 lower secondary classes with a total of 535 students. There were no upper Secondary classes or vocational classes, but there were 58 upper Secondary students and 35 upper Secondary vocational students who attended classes in another municipality. The municipality had no non-university Tertiary classes, but there were 2 non-university Tertiary students and 8 specialized Tertiary students who attended classes in another municipality.

As of 2000, there were 8 students in Avry who came from another municipality, while 131 residents attended schools outside the municipality.

== Transportation ==
The municipality has a railway station, Rosé, on the Lausanne–Bern line. It has regular service to Romont FR and Fribourg/Freiburg.
