= Noréaz =

- Former municipality
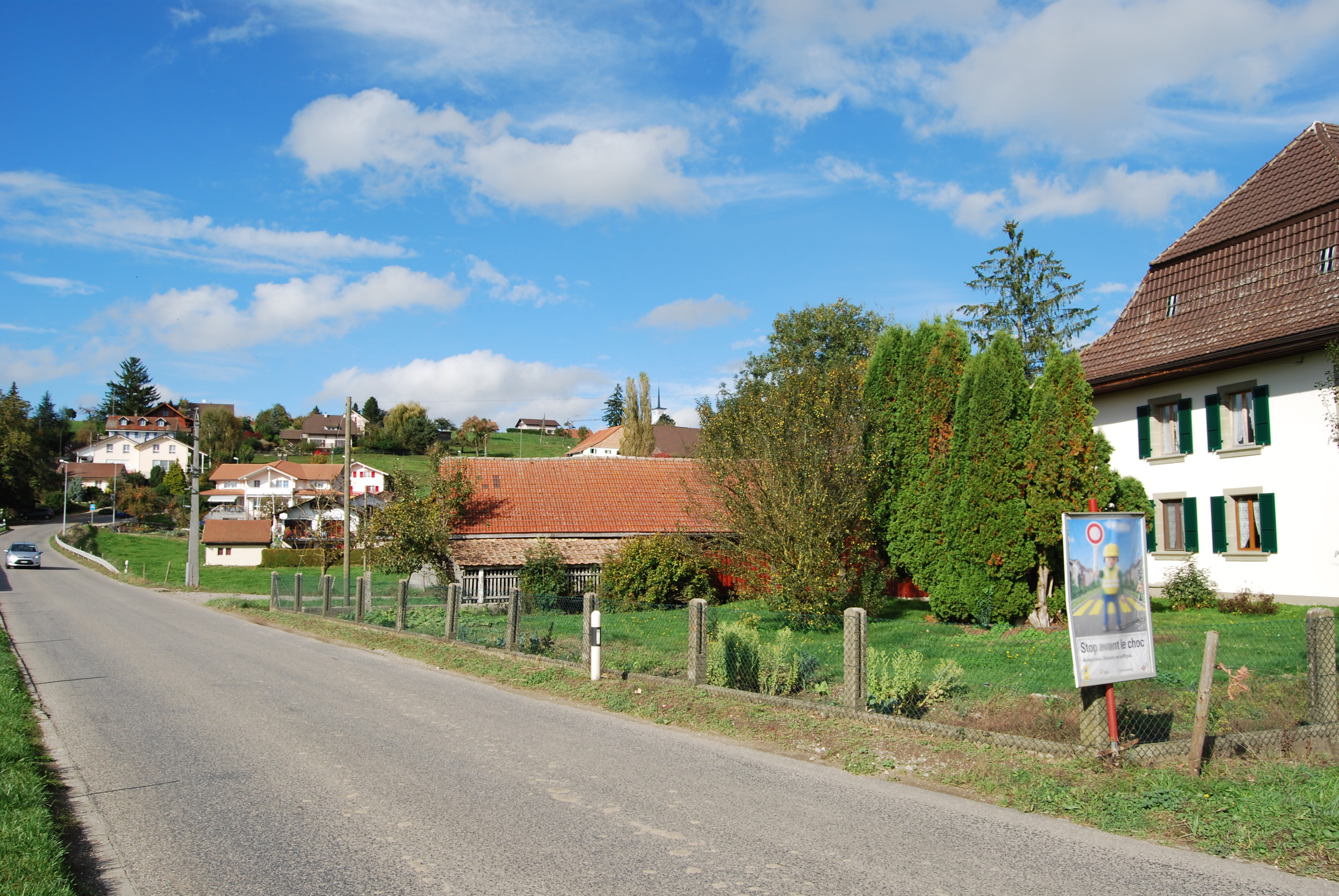

- Coat of arms
- Location of Noréaz
- Location within Switzerland Location within Canton of Fribourg
- Coordinates: 46°48′N 7°2′E
- Country: Switzerland
- Canton: Fribourg
- District: Sarine

Government
  - Mayor: Syndic

Area
  - Total: 6.87 km^{2} (2.65 sq mi)
- Elevation: 638 m (2,093 ft)

Population (December 2020)
  - Total: 707
  - Density: 103/km^{2} (267/sq mi)
- Time zone: UTC+01:00 (CET)
  - Summer (DST): UTC+02:00 (CEST)
- Postal code: 1757
- SFOS number: 2213
- ISO 3166 code: CH-FR
- Surrounded by: Avry, Chésopelloz, Montagny, Ponthaux, Prez-vers-Noréaz
- Website: www.noreaz.ch

Noréaz (French: [nɔʁea]; Arpitan: Noréya) is a former municipality in the district of Sarine in the canton of Fribourg in Switzerland. On 1 January 2020 the former municipalities of Corserey, Noréaz and Prez-vers-Noréaz merged to form the new municipality of Prez.

== World heritage site ==
It is home to the En Praz des Gueux prehistoric pile-dwelling (or stilt house) settlements that are part of the Prehistoric Pile dwellings around the Alps UNESCO World Heritage Site.

En Praz des Gueux is the only prehistoric lakeside settlement on the banks of a small lake in the Canton of Fribourg. The site is dated to the classic Cortaillod era (4000-3500 BC). The site was discovered by accident in 1971 in a boggy area near the present shore of the Lac de Seedorf. Under a layer of about 70 cm (28 in) of peat timbers, gravel and stone slabs were discovered.

== History ==
Noréaz is first mentioned in 1134 as Noarea.

== Geography ==
Noréaz has an area, as of 2009, of 6.9 square kilometers (2.7 mi^{2}). Of this area, 4.37 km^{2} (1.69 mi^{2}) or 63.3% is used for agricultural purposes, while 1.96 km^{2} (0.76 mi^{2}) or 28.4% is forested. Of the rest of the land, 0.39 km^{2} (0.15 mi^{2}) or 5.7% is settled (buildings or roads), 0.14 km^{2} (35 acres) or 2.0% is either rivers or lakes and 0.01 km^{2} (2.5 acres) or 0.1% is unproductive land.

Of the built up area, housing and buildings made up 3.8% and transportation infrastructure made up 1.4%. Out of the forested land, all of the forested land area is covered with heavy forests. Of the agricultural land, 40.9% is used for growing crops and 21.6% is pastures. Of the water in the municipality, 1.6% is in lakes and 0.4% is in rivers and streams.

The municipality is located in the Sarine district. It consists of the village of Noréaz and the hamlet of Seedorf. Lac de Seedorf is located in the municipality.

== Coat of arms ==
The blazon of the municipal coat of arms is Per fess Or a Semi Lion rampant issuant Gules and Azure three Escallops Argent.

== Demographics ==
Noréaz has a population (as of December 2020) of 707. As of 2008, 4.0% of the population are resident foreign nationals. Over the last 10 years (2000–2010) the population has changed at a rate of 19.1%. Migration accounted for 15.1%, while births and deaths accounted for 4%.

Most of the population (as of 2000) speaks French (430 or 91.1%) as their first language, German is the second most common (29 or 6.1%) and Portuguese is the third (7 or 1.5%).

As of 2008, the population was 49.4% male and 50.6% female. The population was made up of 250 Swiss men (46.5% of the population) and 16 (3.0%) non-Swiss men. There were 257 Swiss women (47.8%) and 15 (2.8%) non-Swiss women. Of the population in the municipality, 207 or about 43.9% were born in Noréaz and lived there in 2000. There were 176 or 37.3% who were born in the same canton, while 59 or 12.5% were born somewhere else in Switzerland, and 29 or 6.1% were born outside of Switzerland.

As of 2000, children and teenagers (0–19 years old) make up 30.3% of the population, while adults (20–64 years old) make up 58.3% and seniors (over 64 years old) make up 11.4%.

As of 2000, there were 222 people who were single and never married in the municipality. There were 219 married individuals, 26 widows or widowers and 5 individuals who are divorced.

As of 2000, there were 154 private households in the municipality, and an average of 2.8 persons per household. There were 31 households that consist of only one person and 22 households with five or more people. In 2000, a total of 150 apartments (90.9% of the total) were permanently occupied, while 10 apartments (6.1%) were seasonally occupied and 5 apartments (3.0%) were empty. As of 2009, the construction rate of new housing units was 3.7 new units per 1000 residents. The vacancy rate for the municipality, in 2010, was 1.02%.

The historical population is given in the following chart:

== Politics ==
In the 2011 federal election the most popular party was the SPS which received 29.1% of the vote. The next three most popular parties were the CVP (24.6%), the FDP (13.8%) and the CSP (13.0%).

The SPS improved their position in Noréaz rising to first, from second in 2007 (with 23.2%) The CVP moved from first in 2007 (with 29.5%) to second in 2011, the FDP retained about the same popularity (15.2% in 2007) and the CSP moved from below fourth place in 2007 to fourth. A total of 181 votes were cast in this election, of which 1 or 0.6% was invalid.

== Economy ==
As of 2010, Noréaz had an unemployment rate of 1.3%. As of 2008, there were 42 people employed in the primary economic sector and about 17 businesses involved in this sector. 8 people were employed in the secondary sector and there were 2 businesses in this sector. 173 people were employed in the tertiary sector, with 8 businesses in this sector. There were 269 residents of the municipality who were employed in some capacity, of which females made up 47.6% of the workforce.

In 2008 the total number of full-time equivalent jobs was 190. The number of jobs in the primary sector was 32, all of which were in agriculture. The number of jobs in the secondary sector was 8, all of which were in construction. The number of jobs in the tertiary sector was 150. In the tertiary sector; 2 or 1.3% were in the movement and storage of goods, 1 was a technical professional or scientist, 145 or 96.7% were in education.

In 2000, there were 74 workers who commuted into the municipality and 187 workers who commuted away. The municipality is a net exporter of workers, with about 2.5 workers leaving the municipality for every one entering. Of the working population, 6.3% used public transportation to get to work, and 66.9% used a private car.

== Religion ==
From the 2000 census, 405 or 85.8% were Roman Catholic, while 41 or 8.7% belonged to the Swiss Reformed Church. Of the rest of the population, there was 1 individual who belongs to another Christian church. There was 1 individual who was Islamic. 22 (or about 4.66% of the population) belonged to no church, are agnostic or atheist, and 2 individuals (or about 0.42% of the population) did not answer the question.

== Education ==
In Noréaz about 147 or (31.1%) of the population have completed non-mandatory upper secondary education, and 56 or (11.9%) have completed additional higher education (either university or a Fachhochschule). Of the 56 who completed tertiary schooling, 66.1% were Swiss men, 30.4% were Swiss women.

The Canton of Fribourg school system provides one year of non-obligatory Kindergarten, followed by six years of Primary school. This is followed by three years of obligatory lower Secondary school where the students are separated according to ability and aptitude. Following the lower Secondary students may attend a three or four year optional upper Secondary school. The upper Secondary school is divided into gymnasium (university preparatory) and vocational programs. After they finish the upper Secondary program, students may choose to attend a Tertiary school or continue their apprenticeship.

During the 2010-11 school year, there were a total of 131 students attending 6 classes in Noréaz. A total of 178 students from the municipality attended any school, either in the municipality or outside of it. There was one kindergarten class with a total of 14 students in the municipality. The municipality had 2 primary classes and 35 students. During the same year, there were no lower secondary classes in the municipality, but 33 students attended lower secondary school in a neighboring municipality. There were 3 vocational upper Secondary classes, with 82 vocational upper Secondary students The municipality had no non-university Tertiary classes, but there was one non-university Tertiary student and one specialized Tertiary student who attended classes in another municipality.

As of 2000, there were 23 students in Noréaz who came from another municipality, while 50 residents attended schools outside the municipality.
