= Corminboeuf =

- Municipality
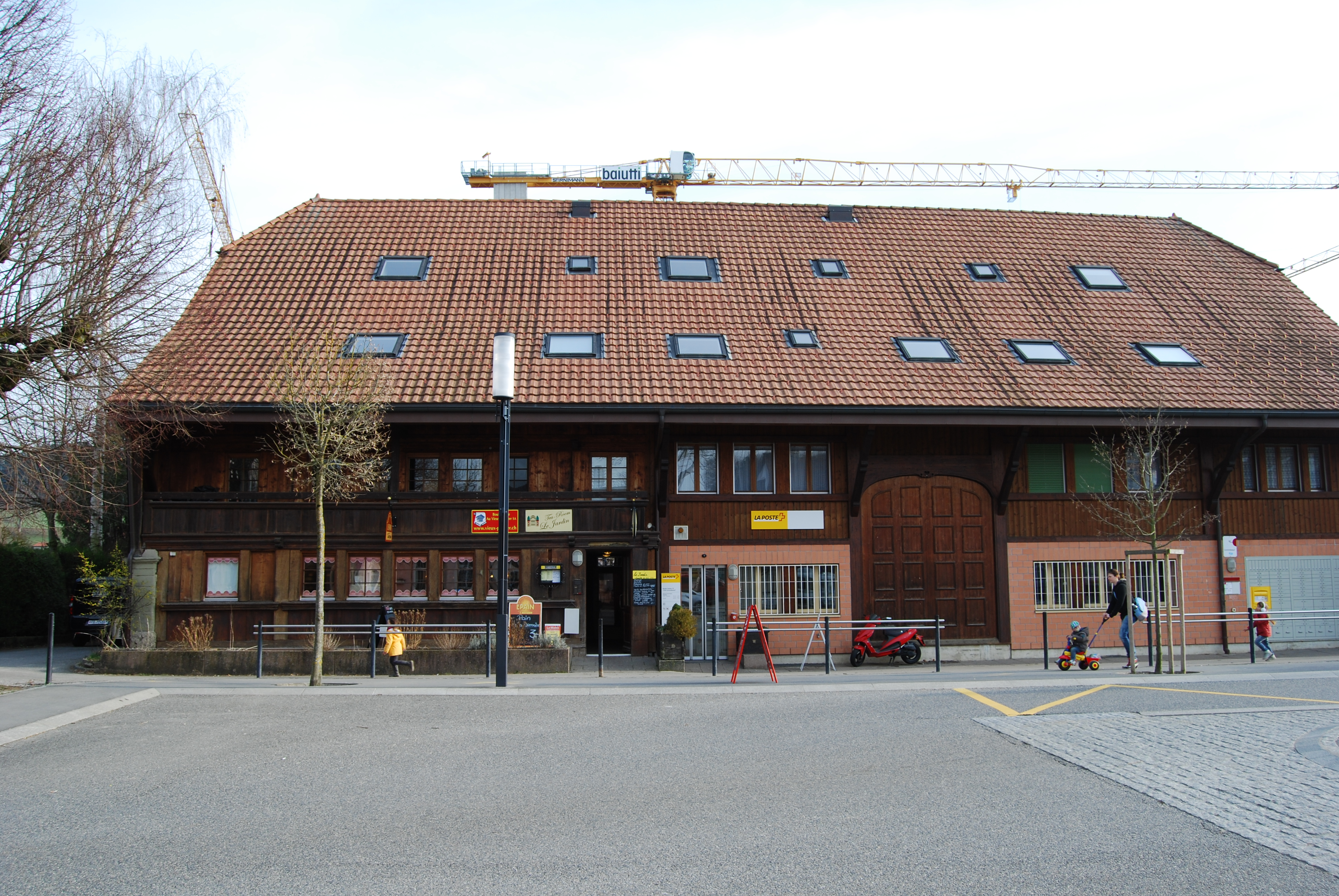

- Flag Coat of arms
- Location of Corminboeuf
- Location within Switzerland Location within Canton of Fribourg
- Coordinates: 46°48′N 7°6′E
- Country: Switzerland
- Canton: Fribourg
- District: Sarine

Government
  - Mayor: Syndic

Area
  - Total: 5.61 km^{2} (2.17 sq mi)
- Elevation: 633 m (2,077 ft)

Population (December 2020)
  - Total: 2,794
  - Density: 498/km^{2} (1,290/sq mi)
- Time zone: UTC+01:00 (CET)
  - Summer (DST): UTC+02:00 (CEST)
- Postal code: 1720
- SFOS number: 2183
- ISO 3166 code: CH-FR
- Surrounded by: Avry, Belfaux, Chésopelloz, Givisiez, Matran, Villars-sur-Glâne
- Twin towns: Fussy (France)
- Website: corminboeuf.ch

Corminboeuf (French: [kɔʁmɛ̃bœf]; Arpitan: Corminbœf, locally Korminbà [kɔʁmɛ̃ˈbɑ]) is a municipality in the district of Sarine in the canton of Fribourg in Switzerland. In 2017 the former municipality of Chésopelloz merged into the municipality of Corminboeuf.

== History ==
Corminboeuf is first mentioned in 1142 as Cormenbo. In the 15th and 16th centuries it was known as Sankt Görg or St Georg.

== Geography ==
After the 2017 merger Corminboeuf had an area of 7.23 km^{2} (2.79 sq mi).

Before the merger Corminboeuf had an area, (as of the 2004/09 survey) of 5.62 square kilometers (2.17 sq mi). Of this area, about 51.8% is used for agricultural purposes, while 33.3% is forested and 14.9% is settled (buildings or roads). In the 2013/18 survey a total of 72 ha (180 acres) or about 12.9% of the total area was covered with buildings, an increase of 38 ha (94 acres) over the 1981 amount. Over the same time period, the amount of recreational space in the municipality increased by 2 ha (4.9 acres) and is now about 0.89% of the total area. Of the agricultural land, 1 ha (2.5 acres) is used for orchards and vineyards, 273 ha (670 acres) is fields and grasslands. Since 1981 the amount of agricultural land has decreased by 50 ha (120 acres). Over the same time period the amount of forested land has increased by 2 ha (4.9 acres).

The municipality is located in the Sarine district.

== Coat of arms ==
The blazon of the municipal coat of arms is Or, St. George armoured Argent cloaked Gules and haired Sable riding a horse of the last harnessed of the third killing a Dragon (wyvern) Vert with a spear of the field.

== Demographics ==
After the merger, Corminboeuf has a population (as of December 2020) of 2,794. As of 2008, 8.8% of the population are resident foreign nationals. Over the last 10 years (2000–2010) the population has changed at a rate of 31.7%. Migration accounted for 24.7%, while births and deaths accounted for 7.3%.

Most of the population (as of 2000) speaks French (1,439 or 88.8%) as their first language, German is the second most common (130 or 8.0%) and Italian is the third (14 or 0.9%).

As of 2008, the population was 50.6% male and 49.4% female. The population was made up of 964 Swiss men (45.4% of the population) and 110 (5.2%) non-Swiss men. There were 967 Swiss women (45.6%) and 81 (3.8%) non-Swiss women. Of the population in the municipality, 389 or about 24.0% were born in Corminboeuf and lived there in 2000. There were 758 or 46.8% who were born in the same canton, while 269 or 16.6% were born somewhere else in Switzerland, and 174 or 10.7% were born outside of Switzerland.

As of 2000, children and teenagers (0–19 years old) make up 28.3% of the population, while adults (20–64 years old) make up 63.2% and seniors (over 64 years old) make up 8.5%.

As of 2000, there were 710 people who were single and never married in the municipality. There were 805 married individuals, 46 widows or widowers and 60 individuals who are divorced.

As of 2000, there were 584 private households in the municipality, and an average of 2.8 persons per household. There were 111 households that consist of only one person and 60 households with five or more people. In 2000, a total of 561 apartments (95.7% of the total) were permanently occupied, while 17 apartments (2.9%) were seasonally occupied and 8 apartments (1.4%) were empty. As of 2009, the construction rate of new housing units was 1.9 new units per 1000 residents. The vacancy rate for the municipality, in 2010, was 0.25%.

The historical population is given in the following chart:

== Heritage sites of national significance ==
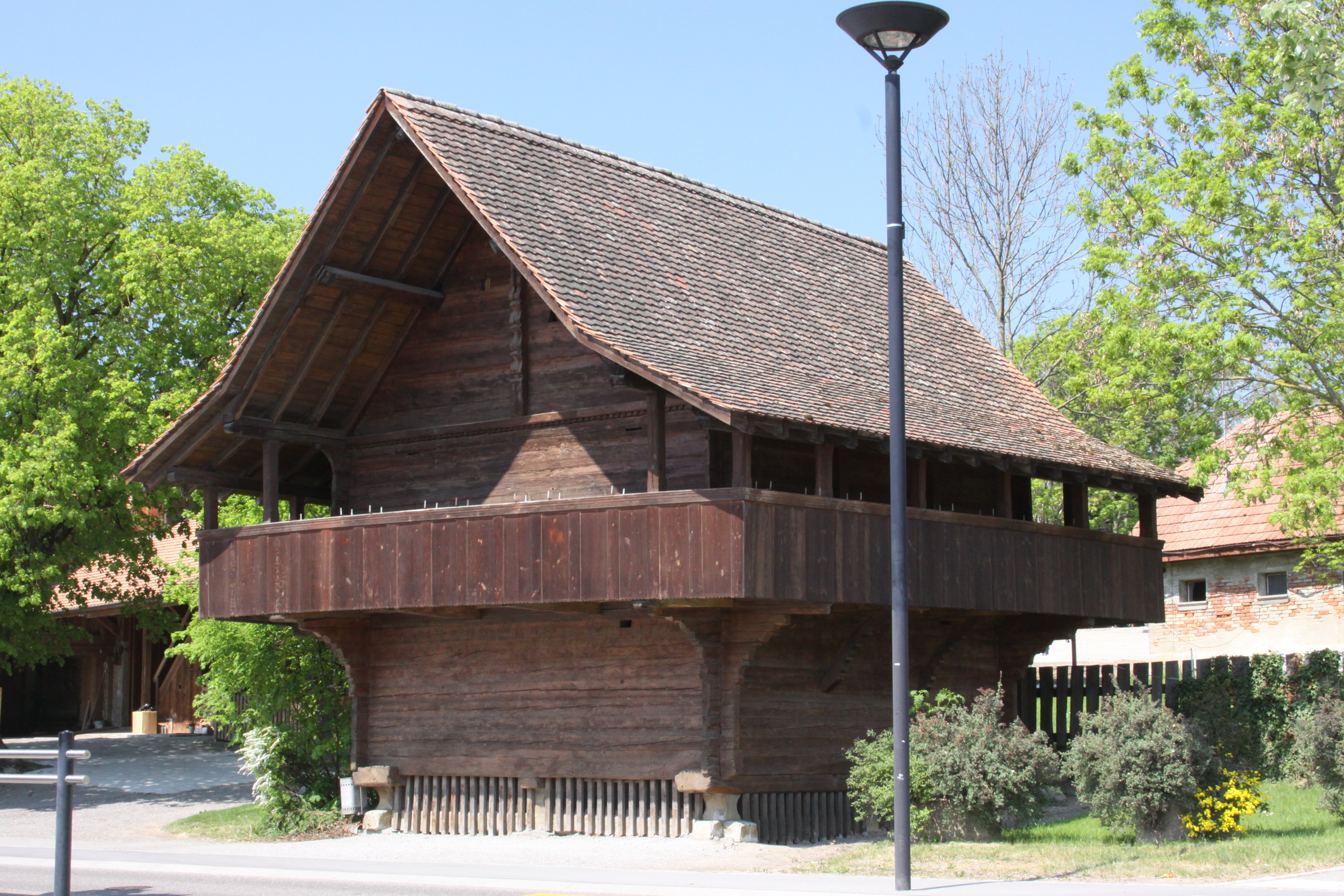
Grenier De La Ferme De Schaller

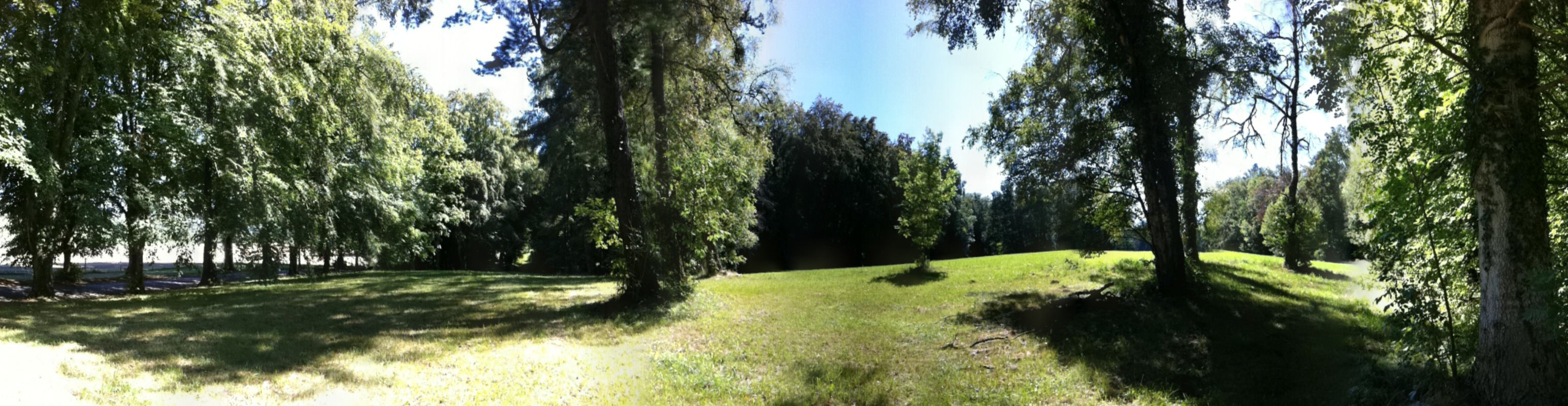
Parc «Bois Murat»

The Grenier De La Ferme De Schaller at Route Du Centre 4A and Parc «Bois Murat» are listed as Swiss heritage site of national significance.

== Twin Town ==
Corminboeuf is twinned with the town of Fussy, France.

== Politics ==
In the 2015 federal election the most popular party was the SP with 27.6% of the vote. The next three most popular parties were the CVP (26.0%), the SVP (18.7%) and the FDP (14.5%). In the federal election, a total of 893 votes were cast, and the voter turnout was 53.5%.

In the 2011 federal election the most popular party was the SPS which received 30.7% of the vote. The next three most popular parties were the CVP (29.0%), the SVP (13.9%) and the FDP (9.1%).

The SPS received about the same percentage of the vote as they did in the 2007 Federal election (32.7% in 2007 vs 30.7% in 2011). The CVP retained about the same popularity (25.1% in 2007), the SVP retained about the same popularity (14.7% in 2007) and the FDP retained about the same popularity (11.3% in 2007). A total of 830 votes were cast in this election, of which 11 or 1.3% were invalid.

== Economy ==
Corminboeuf is a periurbane community. The municipality is part of the agglomeration of Fribourg.

As of 2014, there were a total of 673 people employed in the municipality. Of these, a total of 25 people worked in 6 businesses in the primary economic sector. The secondary sector employed 151 workers in 18 separate businesses. A minority (31.1%) of the secondary sector employees worked in very small businesses. There were two small businesses with a total of 38 employees and one mid sized business with a total of 66 employees. Finally, the tertiary sector provided 497 jobs in 85 businesses. There were 3 small businesses with a total of 72 employees and two mid sized businesses with a total of 230 employees. In 2014 a total of 6.% of the population received social assistance.

In 2008 the total number of full-time equivalent jobs was 473. The number of jobs in the primary sector was 23, all of which were in agriculture. The number of jobs in the secondary sector was 65 of which 14 or (21.5%) were in manufacturing and 51 (78.5%) were in construction. The number of jobs in the tertiary sector was 385. In the tertiary sector; 206 or 53.5% were in wholesale or retail sales or the repair of motor vehicles, 101 or 26.2% were in the movement and storage of goods, 10 or 2.6% were in a hotel or restaurant, 4 or 1.0% were in the information industry, 2 or 0.5% were the insurance or financial industry, 12 or 3.1% were technical professionals or scientists, 15 or 3.9% were in education and 6 or 1.6% were in health care.

In 2000, there were 237 workers who commuted into the municipality and 724 workers who commuted away. The municipality is a net exporter of workers, with about 3.1 workers leaving the municipality for every one entering. Of the working population, 11.8% used public transportation to get to work, and 71.7% used a private car.

== Religion ==
From the 2000 census, 1,318 or 81.3% were Roman Catholic, while 139 or 8.6% belonged to the Swiss Reformed Church. Of the rest of the population, there were 4 members of an Orthodox church (or about 0.25% of the population), and there were 10 individuals (or about 0.62% of the population) who belonged to another Christian church. There was 1 individual who was Jewish, and 17 (or about 1.05% of the population) who were Islamic. There was 1 person who was Buddhist and 1 individual who belonged to another church. 96 (or about 5.92% of the population) belonged to no church, are agnostic or atheist, and 39 individuals (or about 2.41% of the population) did not answer the question.

== Education ==
In Corminboeuf about 579 or (35.7%) of the population have completed non-mandatory upper secondary education, and 320 or (19.7%) have completed additional higher education (either university or a Fachhochschule). Of the 320 who completed tertiary schooling, 62.8% were Swiss men, 29.7% were Swiss women, 4.4% were non-Swiss men and 3.1% were non-Swiss women.

The Canton of Fribourg school system provides one year of non-obligatory Kindergarten, followed by six years of Primary school. This is followed by three years of obligatory lower Secondary school where the students are separated according to ability and aptitude. Following the lower Secondary students may attend a three or four year optional upper Secondary school. The upper Secondary school is divided into gymnasium (university preparatory) and vocational programs. After they finish the upper Secondary program, students may choose to attend a Tertiary school or continue their apprenticeship.

During the 2010–11 school year, there were a total of 227 students attending 12 classes in Corminboeuf. A total of 435 students from the municipality attended any school, either in the municipality or outside of it. There were 3 kindergarten classes with a total of 48 students in the municipality. The municipality had 9 primary classes and 179 students. During the same year, there were no lower secondary classes in the municipality, but 77 students attended lower secondary school in a neighboring municipality. There were no upper Secondary classes or vocational classes, but there were 75 upper Secondary students and 46 upper Secondary vocational students who attended classes in another municipality. The municipality had no non-university Tertiary classes, but there were 5 non-university Tertiary students and 3 specialized Tertiary students who attended classes in another municipality.

As of 2000, there were 23 students in Corminboeuf who came from another municipality, while 185 residents attended schools outside the municipality.

== Crime ==
In 2014 the crime rate, of the over 200 crimes listed in the Swiss Criminal Code (running from murder, robbery and assault to accepting bribes and election fraud), in Corminboeuf was 29.4 per thousand residents. This rate is only 45.5% of the average rate in the entire country. During the same period, the rate of drug crimes was 3.2 per thousand residents, or about 32.3% of the national rate. The rate of violations of immigration, visa and work permit laws was 3.2 per thousand residents or about 65.3% of the rate for the entire country.
