= List of cultural property of national significance in Switzerland: Fribourg =

This list contains all cultural property of national significance (class A) in the canton of Fribourg from the 2009 Swiss Inventory of Cultural Property of National and Regional Significance. It is sorted by municipality and contains 205 individual buildings, 14 collections, 18 archaeological finds and 1 other special site or object.

The geographic coordinates provided are in the Swiss coordinate system as given in the Inventory.

Contents: Top - A B C D E F G H K L M O P R S T U V W

== Attalens ==
KGS No.^{?}	Picture	Name	Street Address	CH1903 X coordinate	CH1903 Y coordinate	Location
1937	Notre-Dame De L'Assomption Church	Notre-Dame De L'Assomption Church	Rue De L'Eglise 7	554.760	151.230	46.510845°N 6.849185°E

== Bas-Intyamon ==
KGS No.^{?}	Picture	Name	Street Address	CH1903 X coordinate	CH1903 Y coordinate	Location
Unknown		ISOS village: Estavannens				
Unknown		ISOS village: Villars-sous-Mont				

== Belfaux ==
KGS No.^{?}	Picture	Name	Street Address	CH1903 X coordinate	CH1903 Y coordinate	Location
1947	Saint-Etienne Church	Saint-Etienne Church	Route Du Centre 10	574.673	185.738	46.822309°N 7.106734°E
1951	Mansion de Lanthen-Heid	Mansion de Lanthen-Heid	Route du Centre 35	574.330	185.793	46.82279°N 7.102237°E

== Belmont-Broye ==
KGS No.^{?}	Picture	Name	Street Address	CH1903 X coordinate	CH1903 Y coordinate	Location
2215	Mansion De Gottrau	Mansion De Gottrau	Route De Payerne 5	567.715	186.442	46.82834°N 7.015504°E
Unknown		ISOS village: Dompierre (FR)				

== Bois-d'Amont ==
KGS No.^{?}	Picture	Name	Street Address	CH1903 X coordinate	CH1903 Y coordinate	Location
1935	Farm House	Farm House	La Souche 1	575.173	179.155	46.763111°N 7.113644°E
9593	La Souche, Mesolithic Shelter	La Souche, Mesolithic Shelter		575.180	178.950	46.761267°N 7.113747°E
9594	Vers-le-Château, Medieval Village	Vers-le-Château, Medieval Village		574.870	176.690	46.740926°N 7.109813°E

== Bösingen ==
KGS No.^{?}	Picture	Name	Street Address	CH1903 X coordinate	CH1903 Y coordinate	Location
11695	Gallo-Roman Complex	Gallo-Roman Complex	Dorf	583.960	193.650	46.893768°N 7.228159°E
1959	Landsitz von Vogelshus	Landsitz von Vogelshus	Vogelshaus 79-81	582.668	191.603	46.875322°N 7.211283°E
Unknown		ISOS Dorf: Bösingen				
Unknown		ISOS Weiler: Richterwil				

== Bossonnens ==
KGS No.^{?}	Picture	Name	Street Address	CH1903 X coordinate	CH1903 Y coordinate	Location
1960	Ruins of Bossonnens Castle	Ruins of Bossonnens Castle		554.710	152.320	46.520646°N 6.848427°E

== Broc ==
KGS No.^{?}	Picture	Name	Street Address	CH1903 X coordinate	CH1903 Y coordinate	Location
1961	Montsalvens Dam (Shared With Châtel-sur-Montsalvens)	Montsalvens Dam (Shared With Châtel-sur-Montsalvens)		576.570	162.387	46.612326°N 7.132786°E
9946	Notre-Dame des Marches Chapel	Notre-Dame des Marches Chapel	Route des Marches 14	574.182	160.218	46.592727°N 7.101736°E
Unknown		ISOS cas particulier: Broc-Fabrique				
Unknown		ISOS cas particulier: Broc-Vieille Cure				

== Bulle ==
KGS No.^{?}	Picture	Name	Street Address	CH1903 X coordinate	CH1903 Y coordinate	Location
1968	Notre-Dame De Compassion Chapel	Notre-Dame De Compassion Chapel	Rue Du Marché 2 A, 4	570.867	163.044	46.618012°N 7.0583°E
1965	Baillival Castle	Baillival Castle	Place du Tilleul 1	570.838	162.995	46.61757°N 7.057924°E
9059	Halle Landi	Halle Landi	Route de la Pâla 101 A	569.450	162.830	46.616024°N 7.039815°E
8661	Gruérien Museum	Gruérien Museum	Rue de la Condémine 25	570.889	162.898	46.6167°N 7.058596°E
Unknown		ISOS petite Village / bourg: Bulle				

== Châbles ==
KGS No.^{?}	Picture	Name	Street Address	CH1903 X coordinate	CH1903 Y coordinate	Location
Unknown		ISOS cas particulier: Font shared between Châbles and Font				

== Châtel-Saint-Denis ==
KGS No.^{?}	Picture	Name	Street Address	CH1903 X coordinate	CH1903 Y coordinate	Location
1985	Saint-Denis Church	Saint-Denis Church	Chemin De L'Eglise 31	558.771	153.189	46.528726°N 6.901269°E
Unknown		ISOS petite Village / bourg: Châtel-Saint-Denis				
Unknown		ISOS hameau: Prayoud				

== Châtel-sur-Montsalvens ==
KGS No.^{?}	Picture	Name	Street Address	CH1903 X coordinate	CH1903 Y coordinate	Location
1989	Montsalvens Dam (Shared With Broc)	Montsalvens Dam (Shared With Broc)		576.570	162.387	46.612326°N 7.132786°E

== Châtillon ==
KGS No.^{?}	Picture	Name	Street Address	CH1903 X coordinate	CH1903 Y coordinate	Location
9595		La Vuardaz; Gallo-Roman Villa		553.500	187.275	46.834992°N 6.829121°E

== Cheiry ==
KGS No.^{?}	Picture	Name	Street Address	CH1903 X coordinate	CH1903 Y coordinate	Location
9948	Granary	Granary	Route Du Centre 21 A	553.863	177.813	46.749905°N 6.834833°E

== Corbières ==
KGS No.^{?}	Picture	Name	Street Address	CH1903 X coordinate	CH1903 Y coordinate	Location
1995	Baillival Castle	Baillival Castle	Impasse De La Ville 5	574.036	167.733	46.660322°N 7.099407°E
Unknown		ISOS cas particulier: Corbières				

== Corminboeuf ==
KGS No.^{?}	Picture	Name	Street Address	CH1903 X coordinate	CH1903 Y coordinate	Location
1999	Granary of De Schaller Farm	Granary of De Schaller Farm	Route Du Centre 4A	574.516	184.229	46.808729°N 7.104761°E
10471	Parc «Bois Murat»	Parc «Bois Murat»	Le Bugnon	573.789	182.254	46.790935°N 7.09535°E

== Cottens ==
KGS No.^{?}	Picture	Name	Street Address	CH1903 X coordinate	CH1903 Y coordinate	Location
2000	Granary	Granary	Route De Fribourg 1 A	568.742	177.725	46.749977°N 7.029559°E

== Courtepin ==
KGS No.^{?}	Picture	Name	Street Address	CH1903 X coordinate	CH1903 Y coordinate	Location
1945	Grand-Vivy Castle	Grand-Vivy Castle	Grand-Vivy 1	580.030	191.139	46.871074°N 7.1767°E
1943	Barberêche Castle	Barberêche Castle	Le Château 1	579.192	189.672	46.857853°N 7.165775°E
1946	Petit-Vivy Castle	Petit-Vivy Castle	Petit-Vivy 4	579.689	190.545	46.865721°N 7.172253°E
9943	Barn and stable	Barn and stable	Chemin de la Fruiterie 5 A	578.587	189.624	46.857402°N 7.157844°E
9944		Granary	Route de Grimoine 20 B	580.368	191.804	46.877066°N 7.181104°E
Unknown		ISOS cas particulier: Petit et Grand-Vivy				

== Cressier ==
KGS No.^{?}	Picture	Name	Street Address	CH1903 X coordinate	CH1903 Y coordinate	Location
2003	Mansion De Reynold	Mansion De Reynold	Route Du Moos 1	577.217	194.224	46.898734°N 7.139649°E
Unknown		ISOS village: Cressier (FR)				

== Cugy ==
KGS No.^{?}	Picture	Name	Street Address	CH1903 X coordinate	CH1903 Y coordinate	Location
2008	Saint-Martin Church	Saint-Martin Church	Grand-Rue 59 A	558.351	185.005	46.814894°N 6.892912°E

== Delley-Portalban ==
KGS No.^{?}	Picture	Name	Street Address	CH1903 X coordinate	CH1903 Y coordinate	Location
2011	Castella Castle	Castella Castle	Delley, Route De Portalban 40–40 A	564.141	196.198	46.915914°N 6.967896°E

== Düdingen ==
KGS No.^{?}	Picture	Name	Street Address	CH1903 X coordinate	CH1903 Y coordinate	Location
2016	Farm House	Farm House	Galmis 6	582.879	189.785	46.858974°N 7.214119°E
2015	Former Hermitage of St. Magdalena	Former Hermitage of St. Magdalena	Räsch	578.244	186.916	46.833031°N 7.153475°E
10505	Grandfey-Viadukt (Shared with Granges-Paccot)	Grandfey-Viadukt (Shared with Granges-Paccot)		579.335	186.170	46.826356°N 7.167808°E
2018	Landsitz de Boccard	Landsitz de Boccard	Jetschwil 15	581.843	187.206	46.835748°N 7.200636°E
10149	Landsitz von Montenach	Landsitz von Montenach	Balliswil 3, 5	579.826	186.406	46.828494°N 7.174233°E
2022	Pilgrimage Chapel	Pilgrimage Chapel	St. Wolfgang 25	580.748	186.553	46.829843°N 7.186311°E
2020	Pilgrimage Chapel of Our Lady	Pilgrimage Chapel of Our Lady	Mariahilf 7	582.143	186.479	46.829216°N 7.204597°E
Unknown		ISOS Weiler: Galmis				
Unknown		ISOS Weiler: Jetschwil				

== Echarlens ==
KGS No.^{?}	Picture	Name	Street Address	CH1903 X coordinate	CH1903 Y coordinate	Location
9952	Notre-Dame De L'Assomption Church	Notre-Dame De L'Assomption Church	Au Village 203	572.192	166.367	46.64796°N 7.075397°E

== Estavayer ==
KGS No.^{?}	Picture	Name	Street Address	CH1903 X coordinate	CH1903 Y coordinate	Location
9728	Church Saint-Maurice	Church Saint-Maurice	Route Des Baudèzes 4, Bussy	558.097	187.218	46.834785°N 6.889381°E
2038	De Rivaz Chapel	De Rivaz Chapel	Grand-Rue 44	554.765	188.901	46.849705°N 6.845541°E
Unknown	Sacré-Coeur Chapel	Sacré-Coeur Chapel	Chemin du Sacré-Coeur 2	554.957	188.635	46.847326°N 6.848084°E
2031	Chenaux Castle	Chenaux Castle	Chemin du Donjon 1	555.015	189.100	46.851512°N 6.848799°E
2032	Collegiate church of Saint-Laurent	Collegiate church of Saint-Laurent	Place de l'Eglise 1	554.876	188.921	46.849893°N 6.846994°E
2033	Convent of the Dominican nuns	Convent of the Dominican nuns	Grand-Rue 3	554.981	188.772	46.848559°N 6.848385°E
2034	Fortifications	Fortifications		554.900	188.900	46.849705°N 6.847311°E
2035	House de la Dîme	House de la Dîme	Rue du Musée 13	555.007	188.876	46.849497°N 6.848716°E
2047	House des Sires d'Estavayer	House des Sires d'Estavayer	Impasse de Motte-Châtel 8	554.840	188.981	46.85043°N 6.846516°E
9596		La Vuardaz; Gallo-Roman Villa	Font village	553.500	187.275	46.834992°N 6.829121°E
9729	Saint-Pierre Church	Saint-Pierre Church	Place De L'Eglise 1, Murist	551.803	182.333	46.790418°N 6.807399°E
2247	La Molière	La Molière	Murist	552.920	183.160	46.797936°N 6.821942°E
Unknown		ISOS village: Bussy (FR)				
Unknown		ISOS petite Village / bourg: Estavayer-le-Lac				
Unknown		ISOS cas particulier: Font (shared between Châbles and Font)				
Unknown		ISOS village: Vuissens				

== Fribourg ==
KGS No.^{?}	Picture	Name	Street Address	CH1903 X coordinate	CH1903 Y coordinate	Location
2063; 9298	Cistercians Maigrauge Abbey with Library	Cistercians Maigrauge Abbey with Library	Chemin de l'Abbaye 2–8	578.619	183.222	46.799815°N 7.158563°E
2077	Former Convent of the Augustinians	Former Convent of the Augustinians	Rue des Augustins 1 / Chemin	579.252	183.760	46.804674°N 7.16683°E
2131	Former Hôtel des Postes et Télégraphes	Former Hôtel des Postes et Télégraphes	Square des Places 3	578.402	183.727	46.80435°N 7.155696°E
2076	Former Commandry de Saint-Jean	Former Commandry de Saint-Jean	Planche-Supérieure 3 & 9	578.953	183.577	46.803019°N 7.162922°E
8824	Archives of the State of Fribourg	Archives of the State of Fribourg	Route des Arsenaux 17	577.966	183.042	46.798174°N 7.150018°E
8861	Archives of the City of Fribourg	Archives of the City of Fribourg	Rue des Chanoines 1	578.969	183.968	46.806536°N 7.163113°E
2105	Auberge de la Cigogne	Auberge de la Cigogne	Rue d'Or 24	579.363	183.678	46.80394°N 7.168288°E
2117	Notre-Dame Basilica	Notre-Dame Basilica	Place de Notre-Dame 1	578.858	184.010	46.806911°N 7.161657°E
2065; 9327; 8926	Cantonal and University Library	Cantonal and University Library	Rue Joseph-Piller 2	578.432	183.969	46.806528°N 7.156078°E
2067; 8663	Saint-Nicolas Cathedral and the Treasury	Saint-Nicolas Cathedral and the Treasury	Rue de la Cathédrale Saint-Nicolas 7	578.964	183.927	46.806167°N 7.16305°E
2176	Maigrauge power station	Maigrauge power station	Promenade du Barrage 5	579.158	183.063	46.798402°N 7.16563°E
2116	Centre paroissial du Christe-Roi	Centre paroissial du Christe-Roi	Boulevard de Pérolles 45	578.271	182.889	46.796808°N 7.15402°E
9261	Cercle de la Grande Société	Cercle de la Grande Société	Grand-Rue 68	578.857	183.880	46.805741°N 7.16165°E
2112	Chancellerie de l'Etat	Chancellerie de l'Etat	Rue des Chanoines 17	579.047	183.927	46.80617°N 7.164137°E
2068	Loreto Chapel	Loreto Chapel	Chemin de Lorette 3	579.203	183.353	46.801012°N 7.166207°E
2069	Saint-Barthélemy Chapel (Pérolles Chapel)	Saint-Barthélemy Chapel (Pérolles Chapel)	Avenue du Midi 41	577.630	183.020	46.797965°N 7.145618°E
2070	Poya Castle	Poya Castle	Rue de Morat 44–48	578.700	184.775	46.813787°N 7.159551°E
2072	Collège Saint-Michel	Collège Saint-Michel	Rue Saint-Pierre-Canisius 6–10, 20	578.571	183.983	46.806659°N 7.157898°E
2073	Convent of the Capucins	Convent of the Capucins	Rue de Morat 28–32	578.645	184.393	46.810349°N 7.158849°E
2074; 8907; 9328	Convent of the Cordeliers	Convent of the Cordeliers	Archives et Bibliothèque, Rue de Morat 6	578.777	184.078	46.80752°N 7.160593°E
2075	Convent of the Ursulines	Convent of the Ursulines	Rue de Lausanne 90–92	578.480	183.776	46.804794°N 7.156716°E
2164	Cure	Cure	Rue de la Lenda 1	579.185	183.738	46.804474°N 7.165953°E
9960	Church Saint-Pierre	Church Saint-Pierre	Avenue Jean-Gambach 6	577.738	183.584	46.803042°N 7.147005°E
2120	Factory Complex de Chocolats Villars	Factory Complex de Chocolats Villars	Route de la Fonderie 2, 6	578.269	182.616	46.794352°N 7.154007°E
2121	Fountain of Fidelity	Fountain of Fidelity	Rue des Forgerons	579.456	183.738	46.804483°N 7.169504°E
2122	Fountain of Force	Fountain of Force	Escaliers du Court-Chemin	578.786	183.734	46.804426°N 7.160727°E
2123	Fountain of Samaritaine	Fountain of Samaritaine	Rue de la Samaritaine	579.279	183.647	46.803659°N 7.167189°E
2124	Fountain of Vaillance	Fountain of Vaillance	Rue des Chanoines	579.009	183.910	46.806016°N 7.16364°E
2130	Fountain of Sainte-Anne	Fountain of Sainte-Anne	Place du Petit-Saint-Jean	579.297	183.633	46.803533°N 7.167425°E
2126	Fountain of Saint-Georges	Fountain of Saint-Georges	Place de l'Hôtel-de-Ville	578.803	183.862	46.805578°N 7.160943°E
2127	Fountain of Saint-Jean	Fountain of Saint-Jean	Planche-Supérieure	578.951	183.543	46.802713°N 7.162897°E
2125	Fountain of Samson	Fountain of Samson	Place de Notre-Dame	578.859	183.985	46.806686°N 7.161671°E
2082	Fountain Jo Siffert	Fountain Jo Siffert	Grand-Places	578.280	183.500	46.802304°N 7.154109°E
2098	Fortifications	Fortifications		579.000	184.000	46.806825°N 7.163518°E
10131	Funiculaire Neuveville-Saint-Pierre	Funiculaire Neuveville-Saint-Pierre		578.534	183.673	46.803869°N 7.157428°E
2064; 8690	Derrière-Notre-Dame Granary and Museum Gutenberg, Museum suisse des arts graphiques et	Derrière-Notre-Dame Granary and Museum Gutenberg, Museum suisse des arts graphiques et	Place de Notre-Dame 16	578.877	184.051	46.80728°N 7.161904°E
2100; 11593	De la Planche Granary	De la Planche Granary	Planche-Supérieure 13	579.023	183.532	46.802616°N 7.163841°E
9405	House	House	Rue de la Neuveville 48	578.796	183.704	46.804156°N 7.160859°E
9406	House	House	Rue d'Or 7	579.318	183.695	46.804092°N 7.167698°E
2131	Hospital of the Bourgeois	Hospital of the Bourgeois	Rue de l'Hôpital 2	578.305	183.857	46.805517°N 7.15442°E
2084	City Hall	City Hall	Place de l'Hôtel-de-Ville 2	578.809	183.838	46.805362°N 7.161023°E
2085; 8662	Hôtel Ratzé et Museum d'art et d'histoire	Hôtel Ratzé et Museum d'art et d'histoire	Rue de Morat 12-14	578.700	184.104	46.807751°N 7.159583°E
9407	Immeuble de rapport Sallin	Immeuble de rapport Sallin	Boulevard de Pérolles 39	578.257	182.953	46.797383°N 7.153834°E
9277	Les Arcades	Les Arcades	Place des Ormeaux 1	578.803	183.936	46.806243°N 7.16094°E
2091	House	House	Rue d'Or 13	579.338	183.702	46.804155°N 7.167959°E
9100	House d'Alt	House d'Alt	Place de l'Hôtel-de-Ville 1	578.834	183.879	46.805732°N 7.161349°E
9408	De Castella House	De Castella House	Rue Pierre-Aeby 3	578.770	183.953	46.806395°N 7.160507°E
2086	House of Fégely-d'Estavayer dite Vicarino	House of Fégely-d'Estavayer dite Vicarino		578.571	183.778	46.804815°N 7.157908°E
2087	House of François-Prosper de Castella	House of François-Prosper de Castella	Grand-Rue 55	578.988	183.867	46.805628°N 7.163367°E
2155	House of Gottrau dite Les Tornalettes	House of Gottrau dite Les Tornalettes	Grand-Rue 67	578.892	183.881	46.805751°N 7.162108°E
2135	House of Jean-François d'Ammann de Macconens	House of Jean-François d'Ammann de Macconens		578.939	183.880	46.805744°N 7.162724°E
2146	House de Lanthen-Heid	House de Lanthen-Heid	Grand-Rue 56	578.974	183.870	46.805655°N 7.163183°E
2160	Reyff House	Reyff House	Grand-Rue 10	578.883	183.841	46.805391°N 7.161992°E
2089	Reyff de Cugy House	Reyff de Cugy House	Grand-Rue 14	578.919	183.843	46.80541°N 7.162464°E
2090	Techtermann House	Techtermann House	Rue de Zaehringen 13	579.145	183.792	46.804959°N 7.165427°E
2154	Nicolas Kuenlin House	Nicolas Kuenlin House	Rue des Augustins 2	579.211	183.731	46.804412°N 7.166294°E
2149	House of tanners Reyff	House of tanners Reyff	Rue de la Samaritaine 16	579.230	183.673	46.803891°N 7.166546°E
9958	House Fégely (?) dite tannerie Deillon	House Fégely (?) dite tannerie Deillon		578.790	183.704	46.804156°N 7.16078°E
2092	The Visitation Monastery	The Visitation Monastery	Rue de Morat 16–18	578.655	184.177	46.808406°N 7.15899°E
2093	Monastery of the Capucines de Montorge	Monastery of the Capucines de Montorge	Chemin de Lorette 8–10	578.864	183.339	46.800875°N 7.161767°E
9263	Piscine de la Motta	Piscine de la Motta	Chemin des Bains 8	578.650	183.498	46.802298°N 7.158956°E
2094	Pont de Berne	Pont de Berne	Place du Petit-Saint-Jean / Rue des	579.417	183.715	46.804275°N 7.168994°E
2095	Pont de Saint-Jean	Pont de Saint-Jean	Rue de la Neuveville / Planche-Supérieure	578.880	183.620	46.803403°N 7.161963°E
9409	Pont du Gottéron	Pont du Gottéron	Route de Bourguillon	579.636	183.727	46.804389°N 7.171862°E
2096	Pont du Milieu	Pont du Milieu	Planche-Inférieure / Place du Petit-Saint-Jean	579.292	183.530	46.802607°N 7.167365°E
2097	Université Miséricorde	Université Miséricorde	Avenue de l'Europe 20	578.105	183.936	46.806221°N 7.151796°E
9597	Old City	Old City		579.128	183.863	46.805597°N 7.165201°E
9965	Villa Mayer	Villa Mayer	Avenue Jean-Gambach 24	577.916	183.850	46.805441°N 7.149324°E
Unknown	ISOS ville: Fribourg	ISOS ville: Fribourg				
Unknown		ISOS cas particulier: Bourguillon				
Unknown		ISOS cas particulier: Vallon du Gottéron				

== Gibloux ==
KGS No.^{?}	Picture	Name	Street Address	CH1903 X coordinate	CH1903 Y coordinate	Location
9955	Chapel Notre-Dame	Chapel Notre-Dame	Posat, Chemin de la Glâne 10	570.535	176.075	46.735217°N 7.05313°E
2061	Church Saint-Vincent	Church Saint-Vincent	Farvagny-le-Grand	571.530	174.600	46.721992°N 7.06624°E
2303	Ruins of Illens Castle	Ruins of Illens Castle	Auge Du Château	574.920	176.430	46.738589°N 7.110481°E

== Givisiez ==
KGS No.^{?}	Picture	Name	Street Address	CH1903 X coordinate	CH1903 Y coordinate	Location
2179	Mansion D'Affry Et Atelier De La Sculptrice Marcello	Mansion D'Affry Et Atelier De La Sculptrice Marcello	Place D'Affry 7	576.305	184.690	46.812942°N 7.128175°E

== Grandvillard ==
KGS No.^{?}	Picture	Name	Street Address	CH1903 X coordinate	CH1903 Y coordinate	Location
9966	Farm House	Farm House	Route De La Grande-Charrière 32	573.056	154.517	46.541399°N 7.087376°E
2182	House	House	Route de la Gare 10	572.866	154.499	46.54123°N 7.0849°E
9967	House of the Counts	House of the Counts	Rue Saint-Jacques 25	572.911	154.370	46.540071°N 7.085494°E
2184	Banneret House	Banneret House	Chemin Pierre-de-la-Tinaz 2	573.162	153.987	46.536636°N 7.088788°E
9969	Rangée d'habitations et ruraux	Rangée d'habitations et ruraux	Route du Banneret 49–51	573.087	154.074	46.537415°N 7.087806°E
Unknown		ISOS village: Grandvillard				

== Granges-Paccot ==
KGS No.^{?}	Picture	Name	Street Address	CH1903 X coordinate	CH1903 Y coordinate	Location
9076	Viaduc De Grandfey (Shared With Düdingen)	Viaduc De Grandfey (Shared With Düdingen)		579.335	186.175	46.826401°N 7.167808°E

== Greng ==
KGS No.^{?}	Picture	Name	Street Address	CH1903 X coordinate	CH1903 Y coordinate	Location
9598	Grengspitz	Grengspitz	Station Lacustre	573.450	196.700	46.920867°N 7.09007°E
9970	Turmspeicher	Turmspeicher	Bureliweg 1 A	573.793	195.677	46.911678°N 7.094632°E

== Gruyères ==
KGS No.^{?}	Picture	Name	Street Address	CH1903 X coordinate	CH1903 Y coordinate	Location
2196	Former Chartreuse De La Part-Dieu	Former Chartreuse De La Part-Dieu	La Part-Dieu 306	567.684	160.725	46.597005°N 7.016909°E
2192; 8689	Gruyères Castle	Gruyères Castle	Rue du Château 10	572.818	159.327	46.584658°N 7.08399°E
2198	Saint-Germain Castle	Saint-Germain Castle	Rue du Château 2	572.696	159.260	46.58405°N 7.082402°E
2194	Fortifications	Fortifications		572.600	159.140	46.582967°N 7.081156°E
9972	Grange du Laviau	Grange du Laviau	Route de Saussivue 73 A	572.751	158.854	46.5804°N 7.083143°E
9476	House	House	Rue du Bourg 7	572.550	159.174	46.583271°N 7.080502°E
9477	House	House	Rue du Bourg 39	572.622	159.239	46.583858°N 7.081438°E
2193	House known as Chalamala	House known as Chalamala	Rue du Bourg 47	572.644	159.265	46.584093°N 7.081723°E
Unknown		ISOS petite Village / bourg: Gruyères				
Unknown		ISOS cas particulier: La Part-Dieu				

== Hauterive ==
KGS No.^{?}	Picture	Name	Street Address	CH1903 X coordinate	CH1903 Y coordinate	Location
2273	Cistercian Abbey of Hauterive	Cistercian Abbey of Hauterive	Chemin De L'Abbaye 17–19	575.487	179.252	46.763995°N 7.117749°E
2275	Votive Chapel of Sacré-Coeur	Votive Chapel of Sacré-Coeur	Route de Matran 29	573.740	179.076	46.762346°N 7.09489°E
2272		Châtillon-sur-Glâne, the iron age settlement		576.210	181.380	46.783164°N 7.127103°E
10501	Glâne Bridge(Shared with Villars-sur-Glâne)	Glâne Bridge(Shared with Villars-sur-Glâne)		576.147	181.576	46.784924°N 7.126268°E
2274	Bridge and Chapel of Sainte-Apolline (Shared with Villars-sur-Glâne / FR)	Bridge and Chapel of Sainte-Apolline (Shared with Villars-sur-Glâne / FR)		575.401	181.510	46.784304°N 7.116502°E
Unknown		ISOS cas particulier: Hauterive (FR)				

== Hauteville ==
KGS No.^{?}	Picture	Name	Street Address	CH1903 X coordinate	CH1903 Y coordinate	Location
9974	Farm House	Farm House	Route De L'Eglise 47	574.447	168.826	46.67017°N 7.104716°E

== Haut-Intyamon ==
KGS No.^{?}	Picture	Name	Street Address	CH1903 X coordinate	CH1903 Y coordinate	Location
2236	Former Auberge De La Croix-Blanche À Montbovon	Former Auberge De La Croix-Blanche À Montbovon	Village 10	569.774	148.607	46.488096°N 7.044976°E
1929	Chalet d'alpage	Chalet d'alpage	Albeuve, En Lys 215	566.061	149.758	46.498272°N 6.996535°E
9976	Farm House	Farm House	Montbovon, Bellegardes 207 A	570.095	148.983	46.491492°N 7.049133°E
2217	Fountain	Fountain	Lessoc, Au Village 66	571.100	150.463	46.50485°N 7.06213°E
9977	House de François Fracheboud	House de François Fracheboud	Lessoc, Au Village 18	571.129	150.415	46.504419°N 7.062511°E
Unknown		ISOS village: Lessoc				
Unknown		ISOS village: Neirivue				
Unknown		ISOS cas particulier: Montbovon				

== Heitenried ==
KGS No.^{?}	Picture	Name	Street Address	CH1903 X coordinate	CH1903 Y coordinate	Location
2204	Parish Church of St. Michael	Parish Church of St. Michael	Dorfstrasse 30	589.436	186.278	46.827564°N 7.300186°E

== Jaun ==
KGS No.^{?}	Picture	Name	Street Address	CH1903 X coordinate	CH1903 Y coordinate	Location
2212	Statthalter House	Statthalter House	Dorfstrasse 15–17	587.555	162.270	46.611568°N 7.276185°E
9980	Farm House	Farm House	Jaunpassstrasse 5	588.571	162.169	46.610678°N 7.28945°E
Unknown		ISOS Dorf: Jaun				

== Kerzers ==
KGS No.^{?}	Picture	Name	Street Address	CH1903 X coordinate	CH1903 Y coordinate	Location
9481	Stellwerk (Signal House at the Train Station)	Stellwerk (Signal House at the Train Station)	Bahnhofplatz 1 C	581.267	202.692	46.975032°N 7.192449°E
Unknown		ISOS Verstädtertes Dorf: Kerzers				

== La Roche ==
KGS No.^{?}	Picture	Name	Street Address	CH1903 X coordinate	CH1903 Y coordinate	Location
2292	Farm House	Farm House	Vers Les Roulin 52	577.806	172.506	46.703393°N 7.148432°E

== La Verrerie ==
KGS No.^{?}	Picture	Name	Street Address	CH1903 X coordinate	CH1903 Y coordinate	Location
2006	Church Saint-Loup	Church Saint-Loup	Le Crêt, Le Crêt 1	559.500	162.111	46.609027°N 6.909987°E

== Le Mouret ==
KGS No.^{?}	Picture	Name	Street Address	CH1903 X coordinate	CH1903 Y coordinate	Location
2277	Former Mineral Baths	Former Mineral Baths	Praroman, Route De L'Eglise 72	580.096	177.829	46.751348°N 7.178145°E
9992	Farm House	Farm House	Praroman, Route de l'Eglise 57	579.952	177.805	46.751128°N 7.176261°E
Unknown		ISOS cas particulier: La Riedera				

== Les Montets ==
KGS No.^{?}	Picture	Name	Street Address	CH1903 X coordinate	CH1903 Y coordinate	Location
2242	Paroissiale De La Sainte-Trinité Church	Paroissiale De La Sainte-Trinité Church	Montet, Au Village 8	556.508	185.141	46.816°N 6.868751°E

== Marsens ==
KGS No.^{?}	Picture	Name	Street Address	CH1903 X coordinate	CH1903 Y coordinate	Location
2355	Baillival Castle	Baillival Castle	Vuippens, Rue Des Châteaux 27	572.400	167.520	46.658341°N 7.078045°E
2223	Saint-Ignace Chapel	Saint-Ignace Chapel	Route de la Rotonde 20	571.385	167.224	46.655635°N 7.064803°E
10007	Philiponna, Farm House	Philiponna, Farm House	Vuippens, Place Saint-Sulpice 6	572.010	167.638	46.659386°N 7.072942°E
Unknown		ISOS cas particulier: Vuippens				

== Massonnens ==
KGS No.^{?}	Picture	Name	Street Address	CH1903 X coordinate	CH1903 Y coordinate	Location
9983	Saint-Maurice Church	Saint-Maurice Church	Sus La Vellaz 84	564.406	172.265	46.700645°N 6.973238°E

== Mézières ==
KGS No.^{?}	Picture	Name	Street Address	CH1903 X coordinate	CH1903 Y coordinate	Location
2228	Mézières Castle	Mézières Castle	Route De L'Eglise 12	560.826	169.927	46.679414°N 6.92663°E
2229	Saint-Pierre-au-Liens Church	Saint-Pierre-au-Liens Church	Route de l'Eglise 10	560.809	169.904	46.679206°N 6.926409°E
Unknown		ISOS village: Mézières (FR)				

== Montagny ==
KGS No.^{?}	Picture	Name	Street Address	CH1903 X coordinate	CH1903 Y coordinate	Location
2232	Notre-Dame Church	Notre-Dame Church	Montagny-Les-Monts, Route Du Pavement 24	565.922	184.488	46.810674°N 6.992151°E
Unknown		ISOS cas particulier: Montagny-les-Monts				

== Mont-Vully ==
KGS No.^{?}	Picture	Name	Street Address	CH1903 X coordinate	CH1903 Y coordinate	Location
2363	House De Steiger	House De Steiger	Route Principale 136	574.068	200.279	46.953085°N 7.097979°E
2365	House d'Erlach-Velga	House d'Erlach-Velga	Rue du Château 1	573.997	200.236	46.952695°N 7.097049°E
2364	House de Wattenwyl	House de Wattenwyl	Rue du Château 18	573.916	200.281	46.953097°N 7.095982°E
2361	Mont Vully	Mont Vully		573.770	201.490	46.963966°N 7.093995°E
9978		House of W. J. Merz	Môtier, Route Du Lac 301	571.549	199.039	46.941828°N 7.064966°E
2366	House Gatschet	House Gatschet	Môtier, Route du Lac 95	573.169	199.816	46.948884°N 7.086197°E
2368	House Les Rondas	House Les Rondas	Guévaux, Route du Lac 361	571.049	198.686	46.938631°N 7.058422°E
Unknown		ISOS village: Môtier				
Unknown		ISOS village: Praz				

== Muntelier ==
KGS No.^{?}	Picture	Name	Street Address	CH1903 X coordinate	CH1903 Y coordinate	Location
2246	Von Ernst Manor house	Von Ernst Manor house	Hauptstrasse 44	576.037	198.298	46.935339°N 7.123949°E
9599		Platzbünden	Dorf, Fischergässli	576.050	198.415	46.936392°N 7.124114°E
Unknown		ISOS Dorf: Muntelier				

== Murten ==
KGS No.^{?}	Picture	Name	Street Address	CH1903 X coordinate	CH1903 Y coordinate	Location
9989	Farm House	Farm House	Erli 2	579.508	200.782	46.957799°N 7.169419°E
2249	City Walls	City Walls		575.600	197.640	46.929404°N 7.118246°E
9499	Grosshaus	Grosshaus	Hauptgasse 43	575.552	197.576	46.928827°N 7.117619°E
2258	Rathaus (Town council house)	Rathaus (Town council house)	Rathausgasse 17	575.456	197.570	46.928769°N 7.116359°E
2256	Löwenberg Castle	Löwenberg Castle	Löwenberg 45	577.088	198.701	46.939001°N 7.137731°E
2307	Old School Building	Old School Building	Hauptstrasse 81	577.994	195.779	46.912748°N 7.14977°E
Unknown		ISOS Small City: Murten				
Unknown		ISOS Village: Salvenach				
Unknown		ISOS Village: Lurtigen				

== Pierrafortscha ==
KGS No.^{?}	Picture	Name	Street Address	CH1903 X coordinate	CH1903 Y coordinate	Location
2267	Chalet De Diesbach	Chalet De Diesbach	Route De La Schürra 15	579.585	182.026	46.789087°N 7.17127°E
9991	Grenier du Château d'En-Haut	Grenier du Château d'En-Haut	Granges-sur-Marly, Route de Pierrafortscha 1A	579.685	181.538	46.7847°N 7.172601°E
Unknown		ISOS hameau: Granges-sur-Marly				
Unknown		ISOS hameau: Villars-sur-Marly				

== Plaffeien ==
KGS No.^{?}	Picture	Name	Street Address	CH1903 X coordinate	CH1903 Y coordinate	Location
2269	Maria Geburt Parish Church	Maria Geburt Parish Church	Im Dorf 1	588.317	176.806	46.742341°N 7.285762°E
Unknown		ISOS Dorf: Plaffeien (Oberschrot, Plaffeien)				

== Pont-en-Ogoz ==
KGS No.^{?}	Picture	Name	Street Address	CH1903 X coordinate	CH1903 Y coordinate	Location
1941	Farm House	Farm House	Route De La Tour 35	572.513	170.932	46.689038°N 7.079317°E
10475	Ruines du château et du bourg de Pont-en-Ogoz	Ruines du château et du bourg de Pont-en-Ogoz		574.110	171.960	46.698349°N 7.100135°E

== Riaz ==
KGS No.^{?}	Picture	Name	Street Address	CH1903 X coordinate	CH1903 Y coordinate	Location
2286	L'Etrey Gallo-Roman Villa	L'Etrey; Gallo-Roman Villa		570.780	166.080	46.645318°N 7.056971°E
9993	Paysanne House	Paysanne House	Rue de la Roulema 10	571.156	165.438	46.63956°N 7.061923°E

== Romont ==
KGS No.^{?}	Picture	Name	Street Address	CH1903 X coordinate	CH1903 Y coordinate	Location
2296	Cistercian Abbaye de la Fille-Dieu	Cistercian Abbaye de la Fille-Dieu	La Fille-Dieu 1	560.904	172.327	46.701007°N 6.927445°E
2293	Romont Castle, Museum suisse du vitrail et Centre	Romont Castle, Museum suisse du vitrail et Centre		560.231	171.616	46.694572°N 6.918707°E
2294	Notre-Dame de l'Assomption Collegiate church	Notre-Dame de l'Assomption Collegiate church	Rue de l'Eglise 81	560.204	171.717	46.695479°N 6.918345°E
2295	Fortifications	Fortifications		560.200	171.700	46.695325°N 6.918294°E
Unknown		ISOS petite Village / bourg: Romont (FR)				

== Rue ==
KGS No.^{?}	Picture	Name	Street Address	CH1903 X coordinate	CH1903 Y coordinate	Location
2304	Rue Castle	Rue Castle	Le Château 1	552.802	163.379	46.619994°N 6.822431°E
9107	House of Maillardoz de Prez	House of Maillardoz de Prez	Rue du Casino 35	552.851	163.365	46.619871°N 6.823072°E
Unknown		ISOS petite Village / bourg: Rue				
Unknown		ISOS village: Promasens				

== Sâles ==
KGS No.^{?}	Picture	Name	Street Address	CH1903 X coordinate	CH1903 Y coordinate	Location
Unknown		ISOS hameau: Rueyres-Treyfayes				

== Schmitten ==
KGS No.^{?}	Picture	Name	Street Address	CH1903 X coordinate	CH1903 Y coordinate	Location
2309	Farm House of the Wirt, Wilhelm Vonlanthen	Farm House of the Wirt, Wilhelm Vonlanthen	Bahnhofstrasse 1	585.481	189.449	46.856014°N 7.248251°E
2311	Kreuzauffindung Parish Church	Kreuzauffindung Parish Church	Gwattstrasse 1	585.550	189.473	46.856231°N 7.249155°E

== Sévaz ==
KGS No.^{?}	Picture	Name	Street Address	CH1903 X coordinate	CH1903 Y coordinate	Location
9600		Tudinges, Iron Age, Metal Workshop		556.900	186.900	46.831848°N 6.873721°E

== Siviriez ==
KGS No.^{?}	Picture	Name	Street Address	CH1903 X coordinate	CH1903 Y coordinate	Location
Unknown		ISOS village: Chavannes-les-Forts				

== St. Ursen ==
KGS No.^{?}	Picture	Name	Street Address	CH1903 X coordinate	CH1903 Y coordinate	Location
2319	Farm House of Joseph von der Weid	Farm House of Joseph von der Weid	Römerswil 5	580.982	182.716	46.795335°N 7.189537°E
2317	Ofenhaus	Ofenhaus	Geretach 2 B	587.118	180.956	46.77965°N 7.269956°E

== Surpierre ==
KGS No.^{?}	Picture	Name	Street Address	CH1903 X coordinate	CH1903 Y coordinate	Location
2322	Baillival Castle	Baillival Castle	Le Château 1	556.072	177.259	46.745071°N 6.863795°E

== Tafers ==
KGS No.^{?}	Picture	Name	Street Address	CH1903 X coordinate	CH1903 Y coordinate	Location
2323	Parish Church of St. Martin	Parish Church of St. Martin	Kirchweg 3	583.140	184.880	46.814859°N 7.217723°E
9997	Sigristen House	Sigristen House	Kirchweg 2	583.085	184.897	46.81501°N 7.217002°E

== Torny ==
KGS No.^{?}	Picture	Name	Street Address	CH1903 X coordinate	CH1903 Y coordinate	Location
2328	De Diesbach Castle	De Diesbach Castle	Torny-Le-Grand, Au Château 4	563.881	180.222	46.772193°N 6.965747°E
2230	Griset de Forel Castle with park	Griset de Forel Castle with park	Middes, A Middes 21	562.414	179.817	46.768469°N 6.946574°E
Unknown		ISOS hameau: Torny-le-Petit				

== Treyvaux ==
KGS No.^{?}	Picture	Name	Street Address	CH1903 X coordinate	CH1903 Y coordinate	Location
2333	Former Church of Saint-Pierre	Former Church of Saint-Pierre	Chemin De Vers-Saint-Pierre 72 A	575.316	176.170	46.736265°N 7.115677°E
9998	Farm House	Farm House	Le Pré de la Maison 12	577.053	175.196	46.727566°N 7.138452°E

== Ursy ==
KGS No.^{?}	Picture	Name	Street Address	CH1903 X coordinate	CH1903 Y coordinate	Location
9999	D'Invau, Farm House	D'Invau, Farm House	Mossel, Route D'Invau 51	556.284	162.832	46.61531°N 6.867942°E

== Val-de-Charmey ==
KGS No.^{?}	Picture	Name	Street Address	CH1903 X coordinate	CH1903 Y coordinate	Location
1973	Chartreuse De La Valsainte	Chartreuse De La Valsainte	La Valsainte 196–199	580.889	166.487	46.649345°N 7.188995°E
1981	Alpine Chalet	Alpine Chalet	Le Lapé 320	583.890	157.060	46.564623°N 7.228526°E
1980	Alpine Chalet	Alpine Chalet	Pra de La Monse 249	578.400	162.091	46.609725°N 7.156689°E
Unknown		ISOS cas particulier: La Valsainte				

== Vallon ==
KGS No.^{?}	Picture	Name	Street Address	CH1903 X coordinate	CH1903 Y coordinate	Location
2338	Saint-Pierre Church	Saint-Pierre Church	Carignan 3	563.146	191.789	46.8762°N 6.955191°E
2339	Sur Dompierre Gallo-Roman Villa	Sur Dompierre; Gallo-Roman Villa		563.280	191.820	46.876486°N 6.956947°E

== Villarsel-sur-Marly ==
KGS No.^{?}	Picture	Name	Street Address	CH1903 X coordinate	CH1903 Y coordinate	Location
10001	Farm House of the Commandry of Saint-Jean	Farm House of the Commandry of Saint-Jean	Chemin De Villarsel 83	579.819	178.793	46.760012°N 7.174477°E
Unknown		ISOS hameau: Villarsel-sur-Marly				

== Villars-sur-Glâne ==
KGS No.^{?}	Picture	Name	Street Address	CH1903 X coordinate	CH1903 Y coordinate	Location
10002	Farm House De La Campagne De Chollet Au Guintzet	Farm House De La Campagne De Chollet Au Guintzet	Avenue Jean-Paul Ii 16	577.233	183.813	46.805085°N 7.140378°E
2346	Pont de la Glâne (Shared with Hauterive)	Pont de la Glâne (Shared with Hauterive)	Route de la Glâne	576.147	181.576	46.784924°N 7.126268°E
10500	Pont et Chapel de Sainte-Apolline (Shared with Hauterive)	Pont et Chapel de Sainte-Apolline (Shared with Hauterive)	Chemin des Auges	575.401	181.510	46.784304°N 7.116502°E

== Villarvolard ==
KGS No.^{?}	Picture	Name	Street Address	CH1903 X coordinate	CH1903 Y coordinate	Location
10004	Repond House	Repond House	Au Village 169	574.603	166.119	46.645825°N 7.106904°E
Unknown		ISOS village: Villarvolard				

== Villorsonnens ==
KGS No.^{?}	Picture	Name	Street Address	CH1903 X coordinate	CH1903 Y coordinate	Location
10006	Church of Saint-Pierre	Church of Saint-Pierre	Orsonnens, Au Village 78	565.990	174.124	46.71745°N 6.993811°E
Unknown		ISOS village: Orsonnens				

== Vuisternens-devant-Romont ==
KGS No.^{?}	Picture	Name	Street Address	CH1903 X coordinate	CH1903 Y coordinate	Location
10009	Farm House	Farm House	Route De Villariaz 11	561.203	167.438	46.657046°N 6.931767°E

== Wünnewil-Flamatt ==
KGS No.^{?}	Picture	Name	Street Address	CH1903 X coordinate	CH1903 Y coordinate	Location
2374	De Weck Country Mansion	De Weck Country Mansion	Bluemisberg 3	588.500	191.260	46.872363°N 7.287793°E
2376	Chapel of St. Beatus	Chapel of St. Beatus	Sensebrück 21	589.399	193.463	46.892195°N 7.299534°E
10010	Apartment Buildings Flamatt 1 and 2	Apartment Buildings Flamatt 1 and 2	Neueneggstrasse 6–10	590.163	193.271	46.890479°N 7.309563°E
9515	Toll Station	Toll Station	Sensebrück 14	589.416	193.491	46.892447°N 7.299757°E
