= Baillival Castle =

Bailival Castle may refer to:

- Baillival Castle (Bulle)
- Baillival Castle (Corbières)
- Baillival Castle (Surpierre)
- Baillival Castle (Vuippens)
