= Chapel of Notre-Dame des Marches =

Chapel in the canton of Fribourg, Switzerland

- Chapelle Notre-Dame des Marches (French)
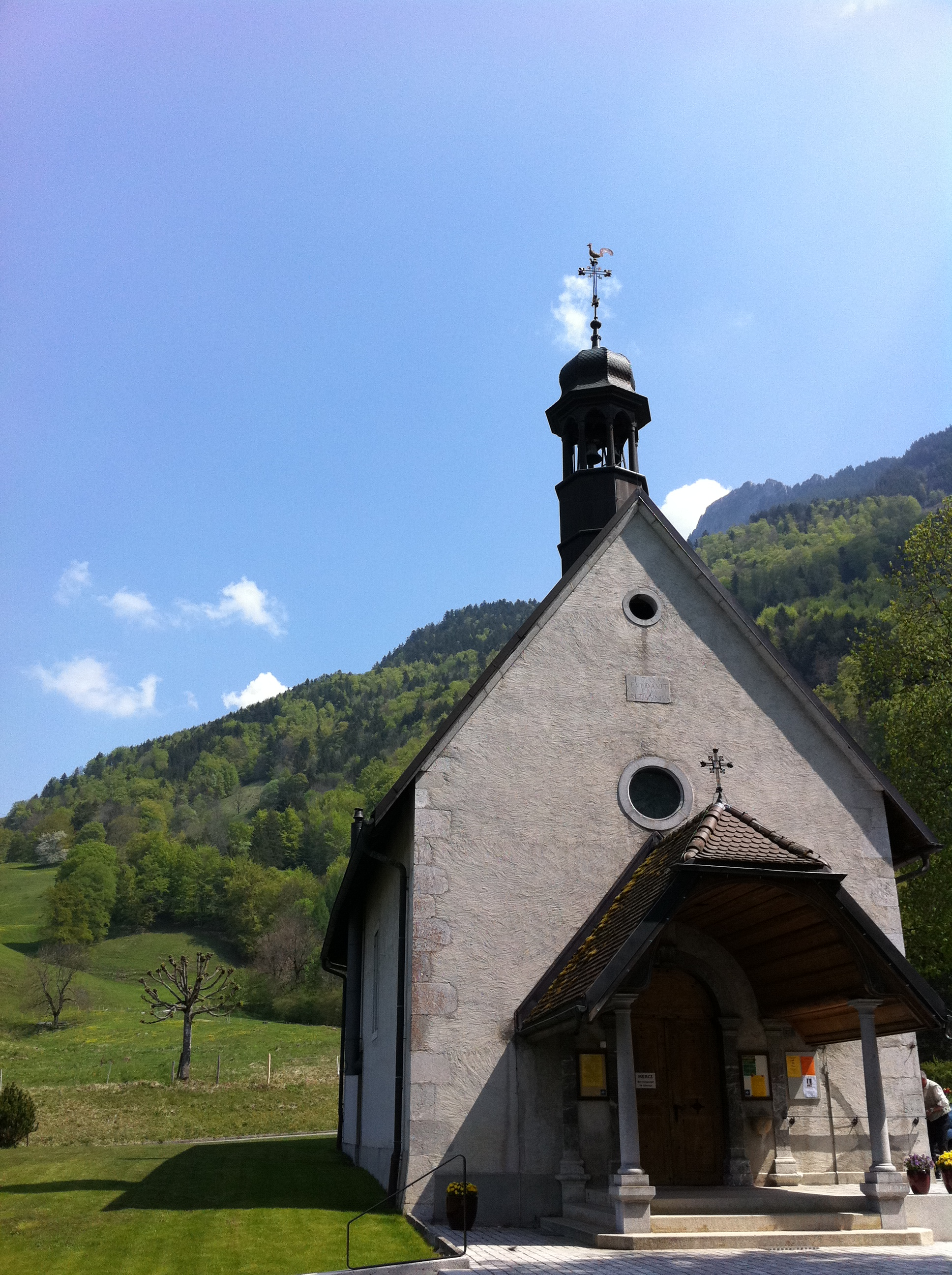

- Location within Switzerland Location within Canton of Fribourg
- 46°35′34″N 07°06′06″E
- Type: Roman Catholic chapel and shrine
- Location: Broc commune, canton of Fribourg, Switzerland

History
- Built: 1705

Swiss Cultural Property of National Significance
- Official name: Chapelle de Notre-Dame des Marches
- Reference no.: 9946

The chapel of Notre-Dame des Marches (French: Chapelle Notre-Dame des Marches) is a Roman Catholic chapel and pilgrimage site in the commune of Broc, canton of Fribourg, Switzerland. It was listed as a heritage site of national significance.

== History ==
The name Marches derives from the word marais (marsh). The current chapel dates back to 1705. It was founded by friars Jean-Jacques, Nicolas et François Ruffieux, three local churchmen.

The chapel of Notre-Dame des Marches gained popularity in Switzerland thanks to two miraculous healings in the 1880s. In September 1892, a temperance pilgrimage was organised there. The pilgrimage still exists today but is less popular than in the beginning. In 1945, because of the war, sick people were not able to travel to Lourdes, so the pilgrimage of the sick was organised at Notre-Dame des Marches. In the 1970s, the number of visitors started declining.

After large gatherings and special train travels in the previous centuries, the pilgrims of the 21st century usually get to the chapel by travelling individually. However, attendance at religious services is quite high. Every year, the chapel receives two pilgrimages: that of the sick in May, and the Autumn pilgrimage in September. The pilgrims are welcomed by L’Œuvre des malades, made of 50 volunteers.

Abbot Joseph Bovet composed a chant in Fribourgeois dialect named Nouthra Dona di Maortsè, translated into French as Notre-Dame des Marches.

The chapel of Notre-Dame des Marches was listed among the Cultural Property of National Significance.

== See also ==
- List of cultural property of national significance in Switzerland: Fribourg

== Bibliography ==
- Rime, François; Rime, Jacques (2005). Les Marches, le petit Lourdes fribourgeois : histoire d'un lieu sacré (in French). Bulle: Editions gruériennes.
- Rime, Jacques (2011). Lieux de pèlerinages en Suisse (in French). Bière: Editions Cabédita. p. 40.
