= Le Vieux Chalet =

Le Vieux Chalet is a Swiss folk song, written in 1911 by the abbot Joseph Bovet (1879–1951).

It has been translated into sixteen languages, among them Chinese and Japanese.

According to Patrice Borcard, a historian and biographer of Bovet, the song has been sung by both the French Résistance and the pro-German Collaboration because of its symbolic lyrics.

== Lyrics ==
Là-haut sur la montagne, l'était un vieux chalet.
Murs blancs, toit de bardeaux,
Devant la porte un vieux bouleau.
Là-haut sur la montagne, l'était un vieux chalet.

Là-haut sur la montagne, croula le vieux chalet.
La neige et les rochers
S'étaient unis pour l'arracher
Là-haut sur la montagne, croula le vieux chalet.

Là-haut sur la montagne, quand Jean vint au chalet,
Pleura de tout son cœur
Sur les débris de son bonheur.
Là-haut sur la montagne, quand Jean vint au chalet.

Là-haut sur la montagne, l'est un nouveau chalet,
Car Jean d'un cœur vaillant
L'a rebâti plus beau qu'avant.
Là-haut sur la montagne, l'est un nouveau chalet.

=== Translation ===
High up there on the mountain, there was an old chalet
White walls, shingle roof,
In front of the gate, an old silver birch.
High up there on the mountain, there was an old chalet.

High up there on the mountain, collapsed an old chalet.
The snow and the rocks,
United to tear it down.
High up there on the mountain, collapsed an old chalet.

High up there on the mountain, when Jean went to the chalet.
He cried with all his heart,
on the debris of his fortune.
High up there on the mountain, when Jean went to the chalet.

High up there on the mountain, there is a new chalet.
Because Jean, with a valiant heart,
rebuilt it more beautiful than before.
High up there on the mountain, there is a new chalet.
