= Baillival Castle (Bulle) =

Castle in Bulle, Switzerland

- Château de Bulle
- Bulle
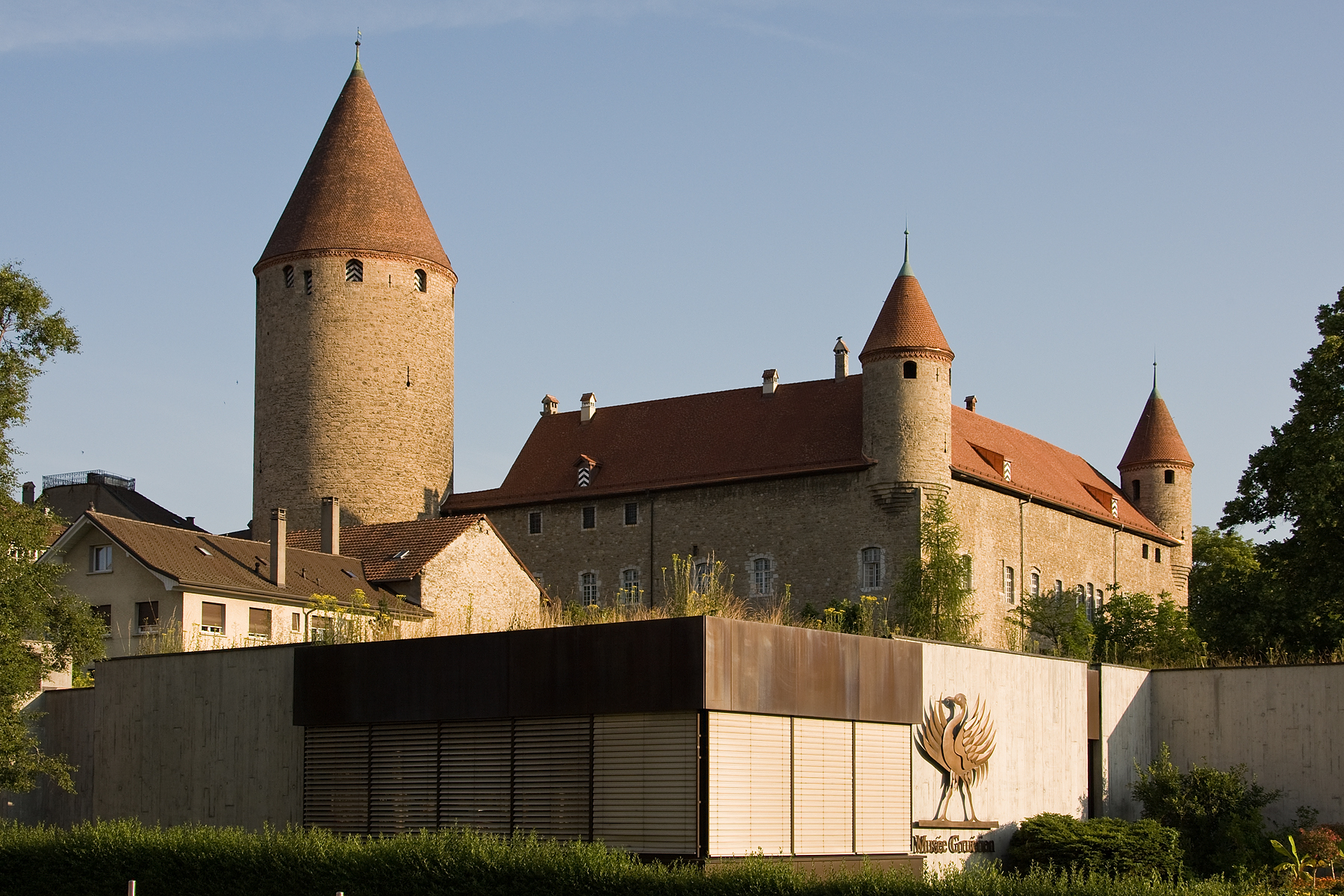
- Baillival Castle

Site information
- Code: CH-FR
- Condition: existing

Location
- Coordinates: 46°37′03″N 7°03′29″E

Site history
- Built: 1291—1331

Baillival Castle (Bulle) is a bailiff's castle in the municipality of Bulle of the Canton of Fribourg in Switzerland. It is a Swiss heritage site of national significance.

== History ==
The castle was erected from 1291 to 1331 by the bishops of Lausanne and is situated at the south side of the market place. It has the characteristic square floor plan of castles erected by the House of Savoy in the nearby Canton of Vaud (f. e. Morges Castle, Romont Castle or Yverdon-les-Bains Castle). This ″Savoy square″ is uncommon because Lausanne and Savoy fought for the bishop seat of Lausanne since the year 1239 and Bulle always was an episcopal town that never belonged to the House of Savoy. But in a short time period right before the year 1239 members of the House of Savoy were bishops of Lausanne. That causes speculations about an earlier building in Bulle that was erected by the House of Savoy which became more likely after a coat of arms of Savoy was found engraved in a window of the castle of Bulle during a renovation.

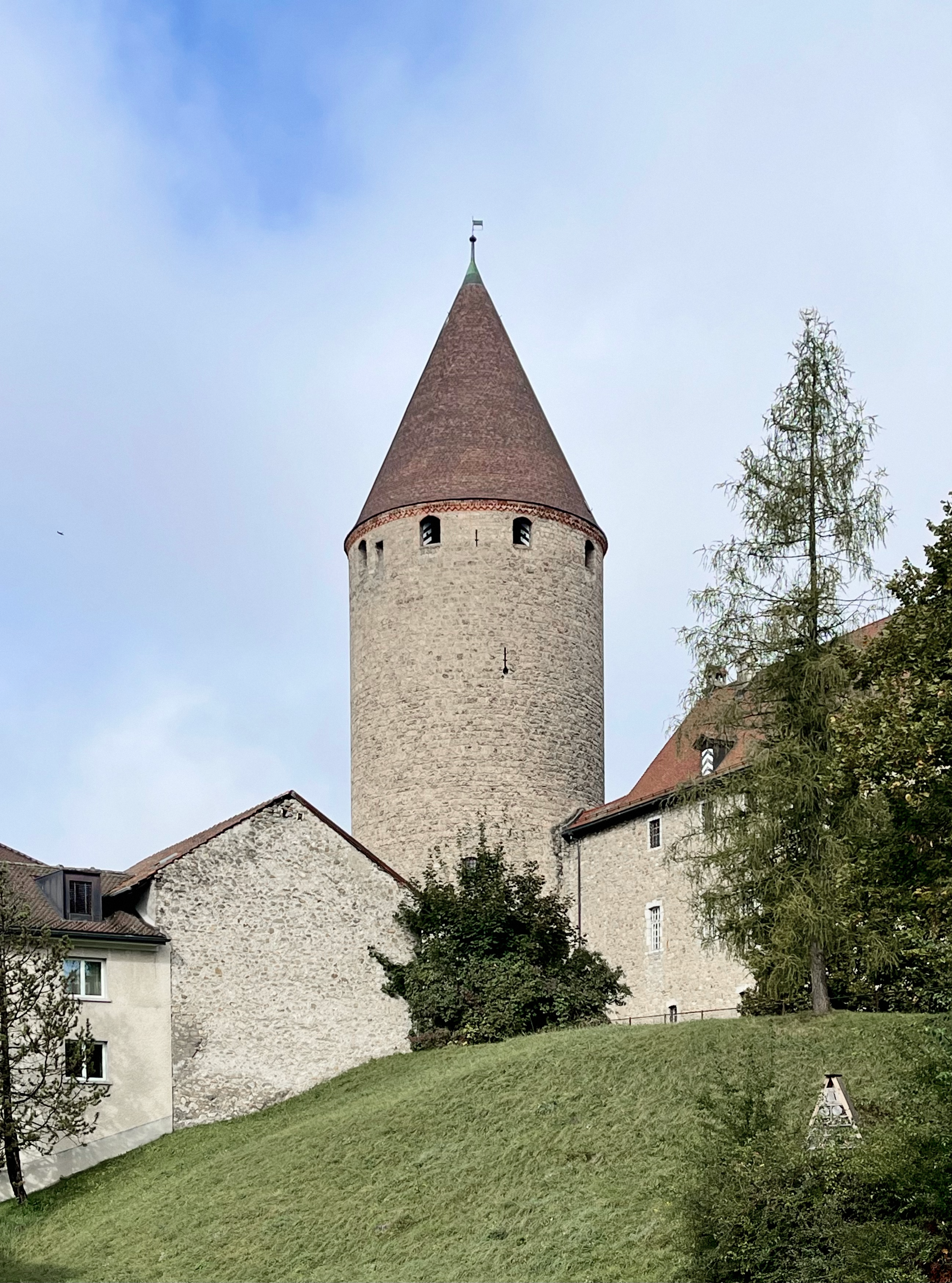
Donjon of the Baillival Castle in Bulle

The castle survived the Burgundian Wars by entering an alliance with the city of Fribourg which protected Bulle and the castle from looting in 1476. During the conquest of the Vaud by the Bernese in 1536 Fribourg took the chance to get Bulle under full protection because the bishop of Lausanne Sébastien de Montfalcon had fled. Fribourg then transformed the episcopal castle into the bailiff's castle and later found an agreement with the bishop of Lausanne in 1614. The castle was renovated from 1763 to 1768. In 1798 the people of Bulle used the French invasion to throw the governor out of the city. Since then the castle is a district administration building. Prisons cells were added since 1854. Since the castle was never destroyed, it still looks like it did centuries ago. It consists of an inner courtyard surrounded by the buildings, a tower in the southwest and bartizans on the other corners. The castle is surrounded by a former moat that was filled by the water of the Les Usiniers canal. The former bridge that led to the main gate was a wooden drawbridge but has been replaced by a stone bridge.

== See also ==
- List of castles in Switzerland
- Château
