= Poya Castle =

Castle in Fribourg, Switzerland

- Château de La Poya
- Fribourg
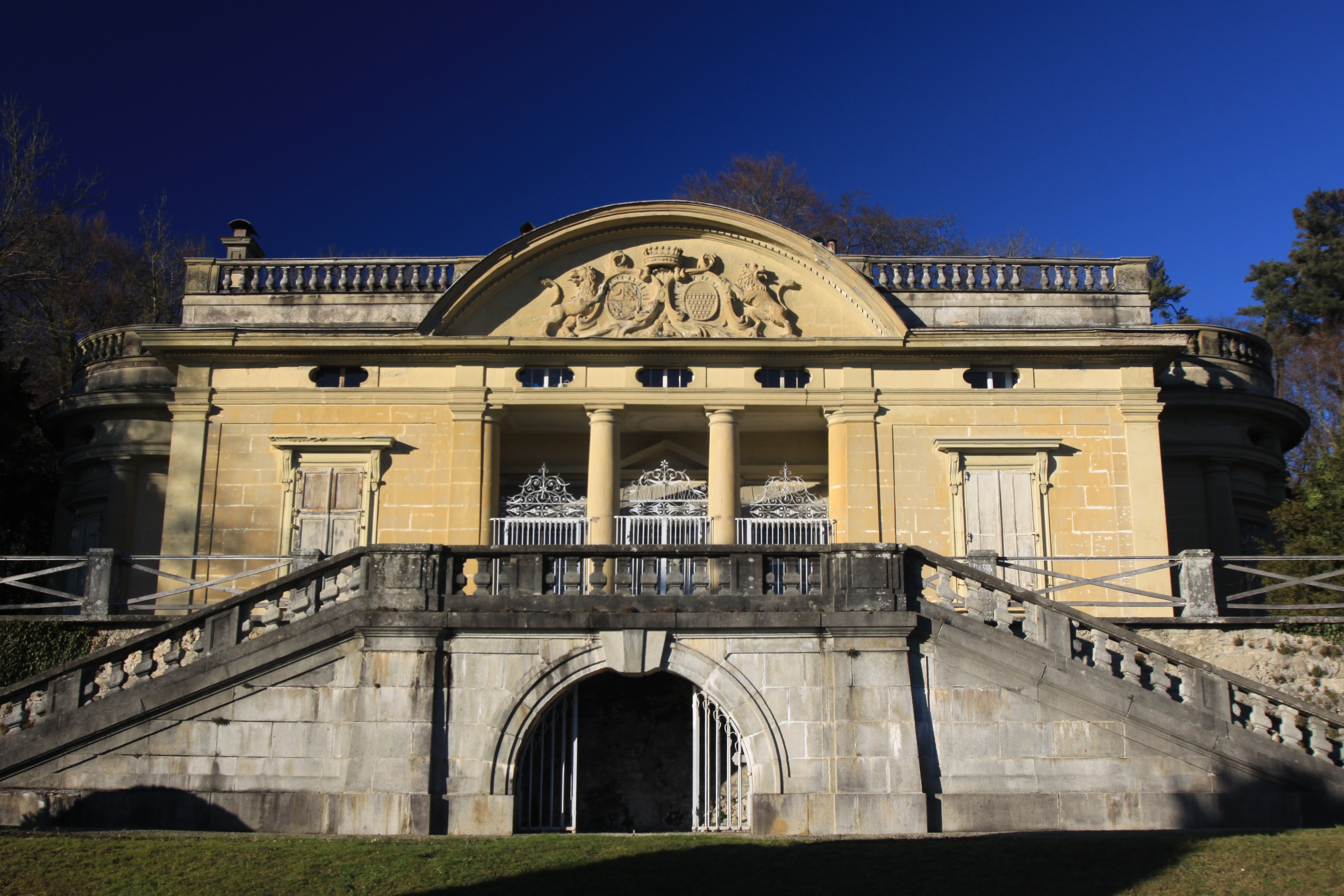
- Schloss La Poya

Site information
- Code: CH-FR
- Condition: preserved

Location
- Coordinates: 46°48′50″N 7°09′34″E
- Height: 610 m above the sea

Site history
- Built: 1698

Poya Castle (French: Château de la Poya, pronounced [ʃato də la pɔja]) is a castle in the municipality of Fribourg of the Canton of Fribourg in Switzerland. It is the first example of Neo-Palladian architecture north of the Alps. It is a Swiss heritage site of national significance.

== See also ==
- List of castles in Switzerland
- Château
