= Abbaye de la Fille-Dieu =

Cistercian monastery in Romont, Switzerland

Abbaye Notre-Dame de la Fille-Dieu
- Abtei La Fille-Dieu
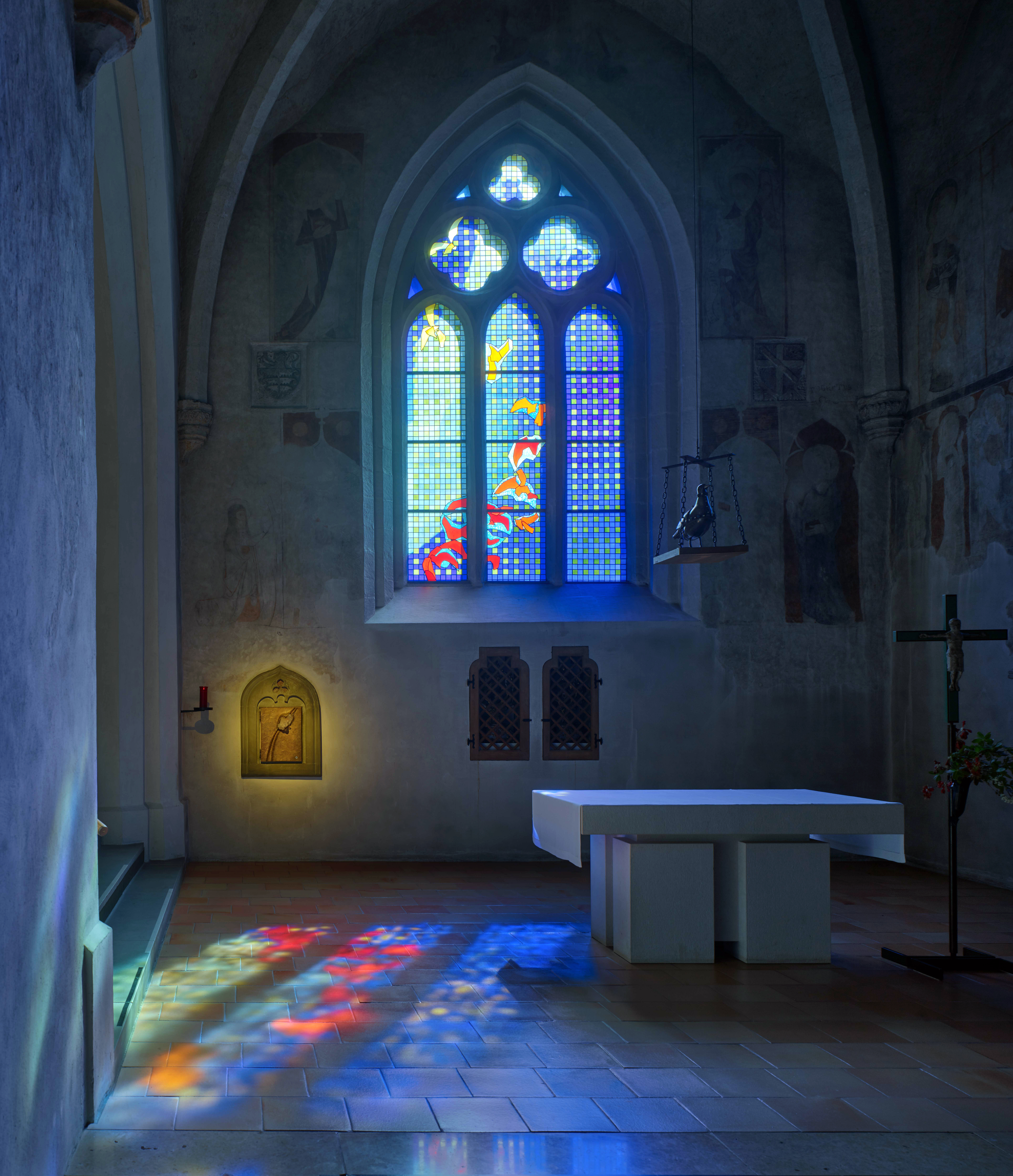
- The 14th century sanctuary and east window of the restored Abbaye de la Fille-Dieu

- Location within Canton of Fribourg Location within Switzerland

Monastery information
- Full name: Abbaye Notre Dame de la Fille-Dieu
- Other name: Notre Dame de la Fille-Dieu
- Order: Cistercian
- Established: 1268
- Diocese: Roman Catholic Diocese of Lausanne, Geneva and Fribourg

People
- Founders: Jean de Cossonay, Bishop of Lausanne
- Abbess: Sœur Marie-Claire Pauchard
- Important associated figures: Saint Marguerite Bays

Architecture
- Heritage designation: class A Swiss cultural property of national significance
- Architect: Tomas Mikulas (restoration)

Site
- Location: Romont, Fribourg Canton, Switzerland
- Coordinates: 46°42′04″N 6°55′40″E
- Website: https://fille-dieu.ch

The Abbaye de la Fille-Dieu is a Cistercian monastery located near the town of Romont in the Swiss Canton of Fribourg. Founded as a Benedictine priory in 1268, and continuously occupied by a community of nuns since its establishment, the alpine abbey is a Swiss heritage site of national significance. Heavily altered through its history, Fille-Dieu was restructured by economic turmoil, fire, additions and unsympathetic alterations. In 1906 the abbey became affiliated with the Trappists, and between 1990 and 1996 an internationally notable restoration was undertaken, modernising the monastic buildings, restoring the abbey church to its original volume, and preserving its rediscovered medieval murals, with the only contemporary element a suite of stained glass windows commissioned from the British artist Brian Clarke. Further restoration of the abbey continues today.

== Early history ==
In 1268, the Bishop of Lausanne, Jean de Cossonay, visited a small community of women who, in 1265, had founded a house of prayer near Romont. He authorised Juliette, Pernette and Cécile de Villa to erect a monastery on the site and gave it the name 'Fille-Dieu'.

== Modern history ==
In 1906, the abbey joined the Cistercian Order of Strict Observance, colloquially known as Trappists.

=== Restoration ===
==== Stained glass ====
In 2009, the stained glass of the oculus window of the abbey was destroyed in a hailstorm. The artist, Brian Clarke, had been dissatisfied with the 1996 resolution of the window in his original programme of works, and this "sign of God" presented an opportunity to design and fabricate a replacement, for which he was commissioned. The new window was inaugurated and blessed in 2010, and the design for the window was presented to the Swiss National Museum of Stained Glass in Romont.
