= La Molière Castle =

Castle ruin in the canton of Fribourg

- Tour de la Molière
- Estavayer, canton of Fribourg
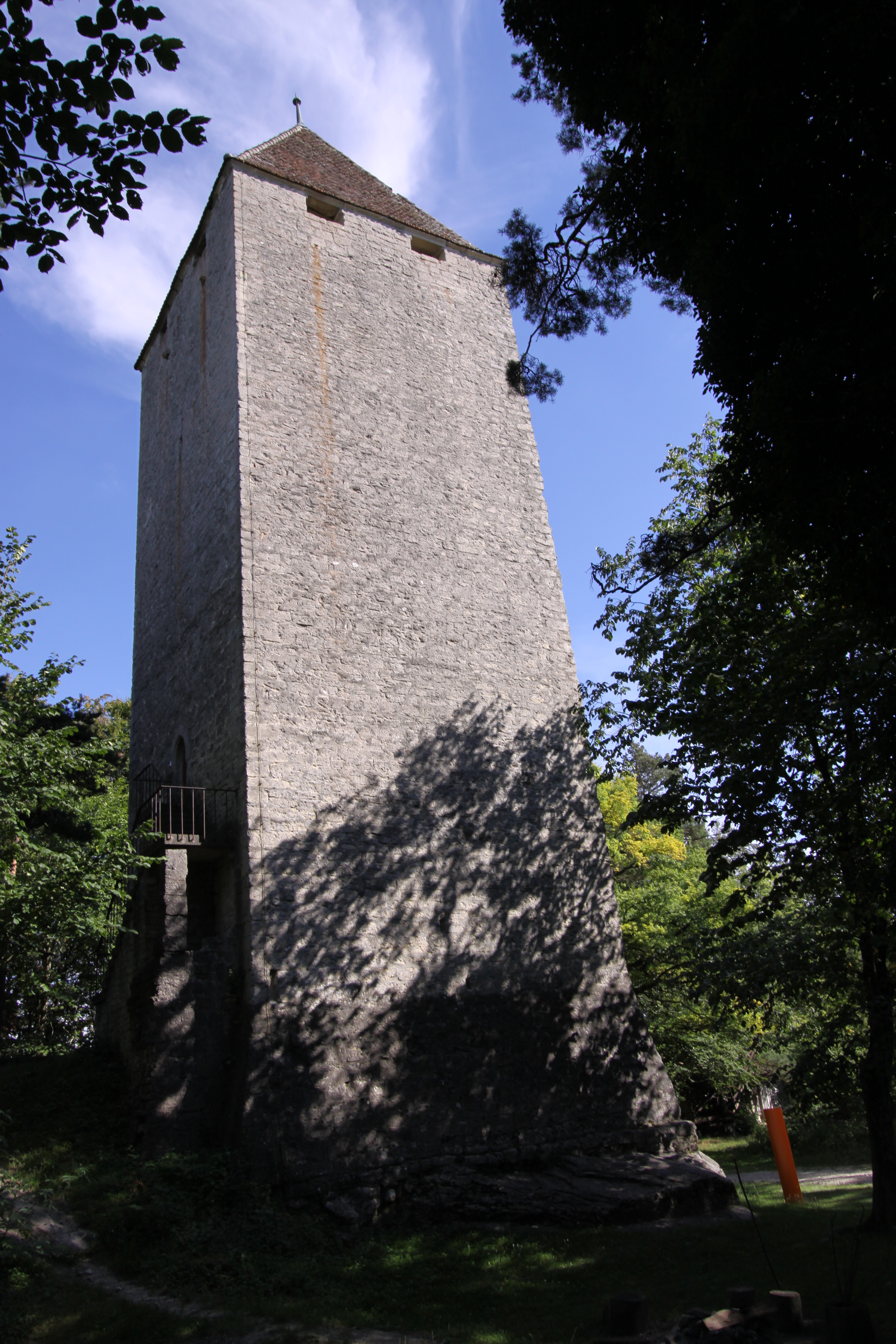
- The main tower

Site information
- Type: Castle
- Condition: Ruin, probably destroyed in 1475; only the main tower still stands

Location
- Coordinates: 46.797934°N 6.821936°E
- Area: 7,000 m^{2}

Site history
- Built: Probably first half of the 13th century
- Built by: Probably the lords of Font

La Molière Castle, now called the Tour de la Molière, is a ruined castle in the municipality of Estavayer in the canton of Fribourg, Switzerland, above the village of Frasses. La Molière is also the name of a former lordship (Font-La Molière). The castle was probably built by the lords of Font in the first half of the 13th century and probably destroyed by Fribourg and Bern in 1475. Only its square main tower still stands.

== History ==
The lordship of La Molière was divided within the family in 1303. Various parts of it passed by marriage, inheritance and purchase to Savoy and to the families of Montagny, Gruyère, Illens, Pesmes, Mayor de Cugy and Glâne. In 1520 Boniface de la Molière sold the main part of the lordship to Fribourg. Fribourg conquered the rest in 1536 and incorporated it into the bailiwick of Font (from 1604 the bailiwick of Font-Vuissens).

The castle, probably built by the lords of Font in the first half of the 13th century, was an extensive complex (7,000 m^{2}) rising high above the village of Frasses. It was probably destroyed by Fribourg and Bern in 1475. The ruin is attested in pictorial sources in 1580. Still owned by the state, it served as a quarry from 1820 to 1833 for the building of the rectory and the choir of the church of Murist. Of the large castle only the square main tower still stands, 9 m on each side with walls 2.5 m thick, which is why the site is now known simply as the Tour de la Molière.

== Bibliography ==
- E. Bise, Notice sur la paroisse de Murist et la Seigneurie de la Molière, 1910, pp. 131–190
- B. de Vevey, Châteaux et maisons fortes du canton de Fribourg, 1978, pp. 212–217
