= Bossonnens Castle =

Castle in Bossonnens, Switzerland

Bossonnens
- Bossonnens
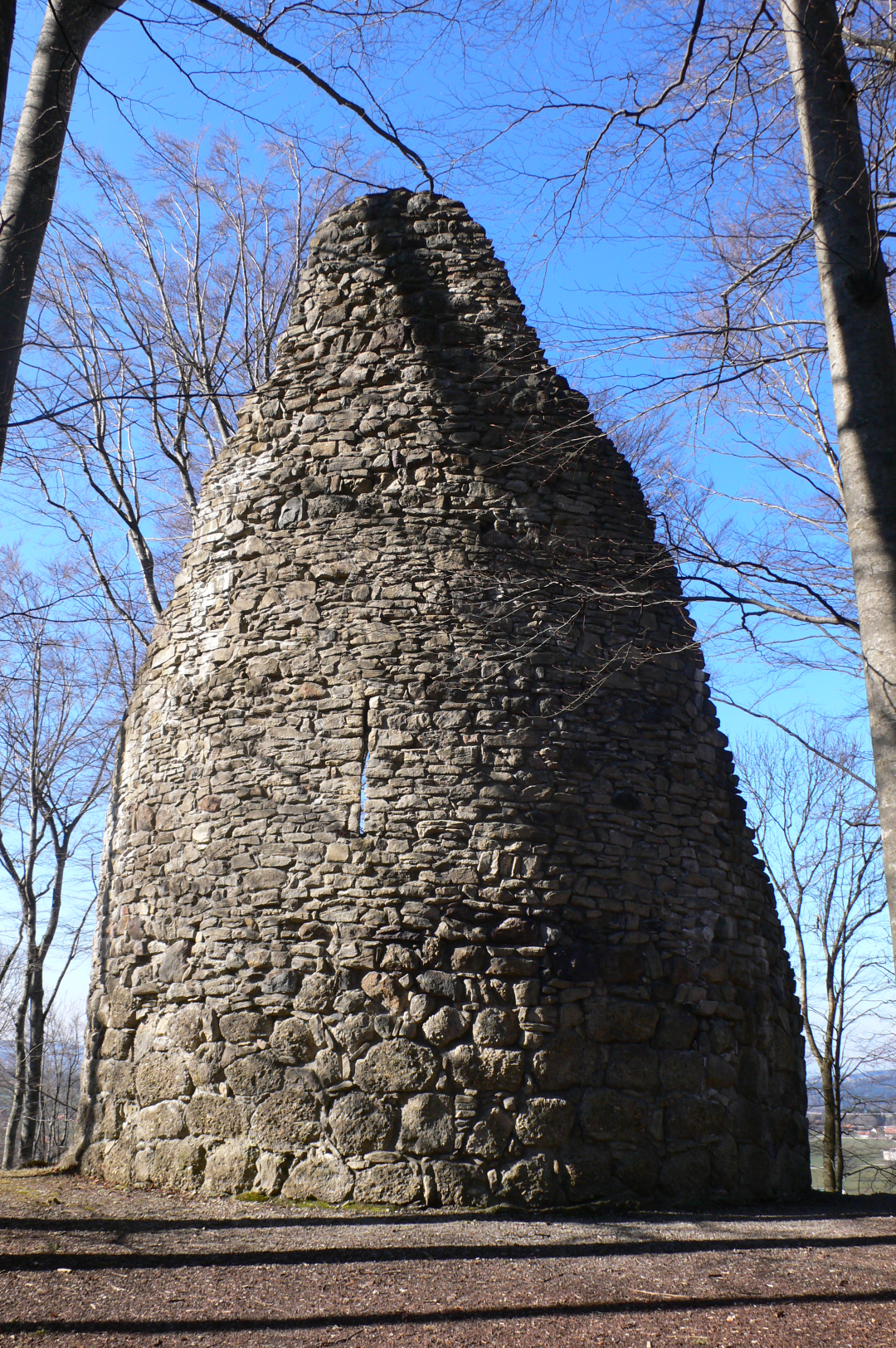
- Round tower at the southern end of Bossonnens Castle

Site information
- Code: CH-FR
- Condition: ruined

Location
- Coordinates: 46°31′14″N 6°50′54″E

Site history
- Built: 12th century

Bossonnens Castle is a castle in the municipality of Bossonnens of the Canton of Fribourg in Switzerland. It is a Swiss heritage site of national significance.

== See also ==
- List of castles and fortresses in Switzerland
- Cultural heritage protection in Switzerland
- Historic monument (Switzerland)
- Inventory of Swiss Heritage Sites
- Château
