= Joseph Bovet =

Swiss composer and priest (1879–1951)

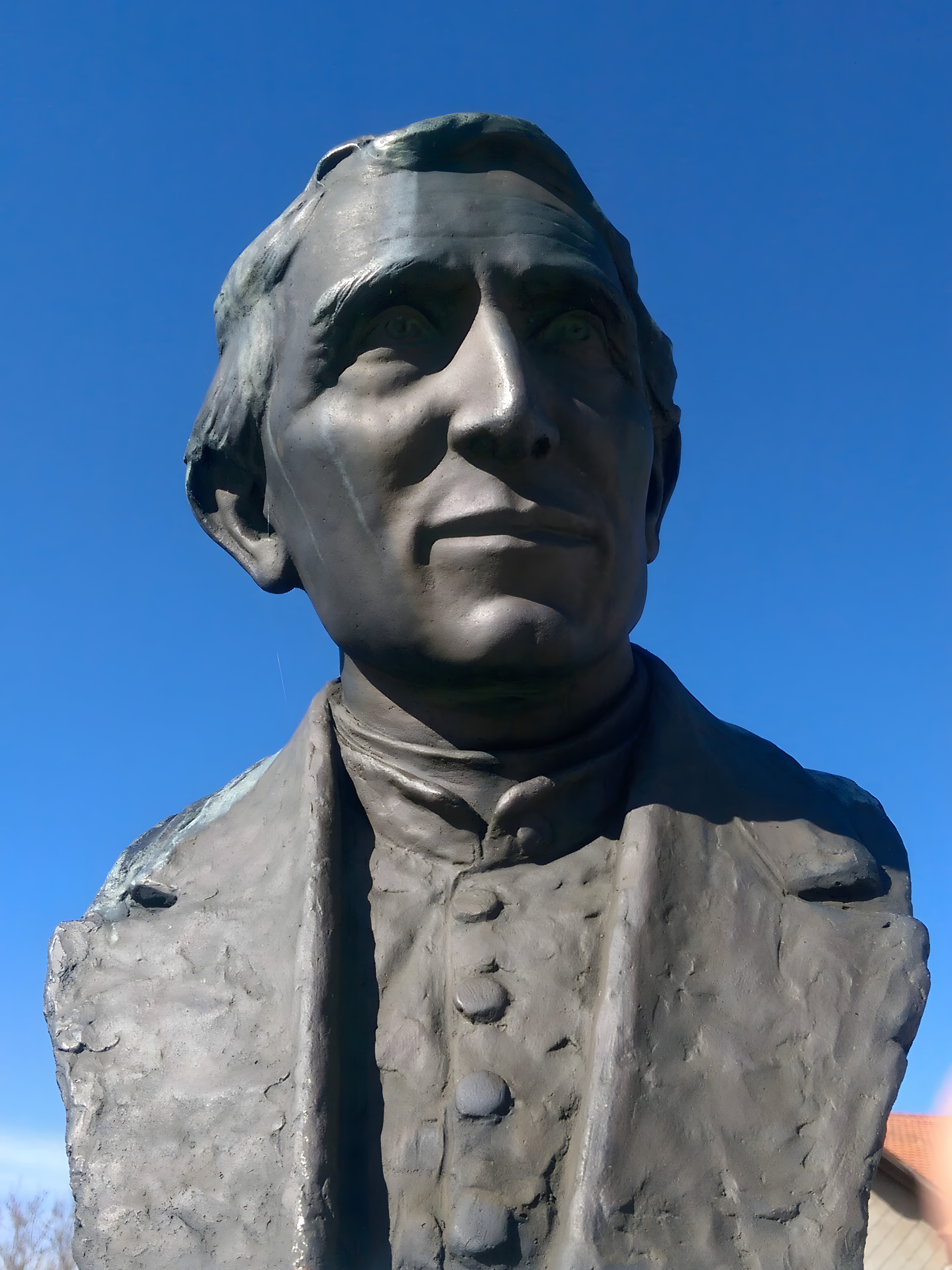
- Born: 8 October 1879; Sâles (Gruyère)
- Died: 10 February 1951 (aged 71); Clarens
- Monuments: in Fribourg and Bulle
- Occupations: abbot, bandmaster, composer
- Known for: religious and folk music
- Notable work: Le Vieux Chalet (1911)

Joseph Bovet (8 October 1879 – 10 February 1951) was a Catholic priest from the Fribourg area of Switzerland who coined folk music and cultural identity of both Fribourg and Vaud. He was born in 1879 as the son of Pierre Bovet, a teacher and farmer, and Marie-Joséphine Bovet née Andrey.

After visiting the Collège Saint-Charles in Romont, he went on to study at the St. Michael college in Fribourg. Stays in Einsiedeln (1900-1901) and the Benedictine abbey of Seckau (1903) followed. In 1905, he was ordained as a priest.

Following his clerical work in Geneva, he returned to Fribourg in 1908, where he was named maître de chapelle in 1923 and chanoine in 1930. He went on to lead the most important musical ensembles of the town, and coined the musical scene in the Canton of Fribourg. During his life, he composed about 2000 musical pieces, half of which were religious, with the rest belonging to folk music.

== Literature ==
- Borcard, Patrice (1993). Joseph Bovet 1879-1951: itinéraire d'un abbé chantant [Joseph Bovet 1879-1951: itinerary of a singing abbot] (in French). ISBN 288355014X.
