= Château de Bois Murat =

Historic estate in Switzerland

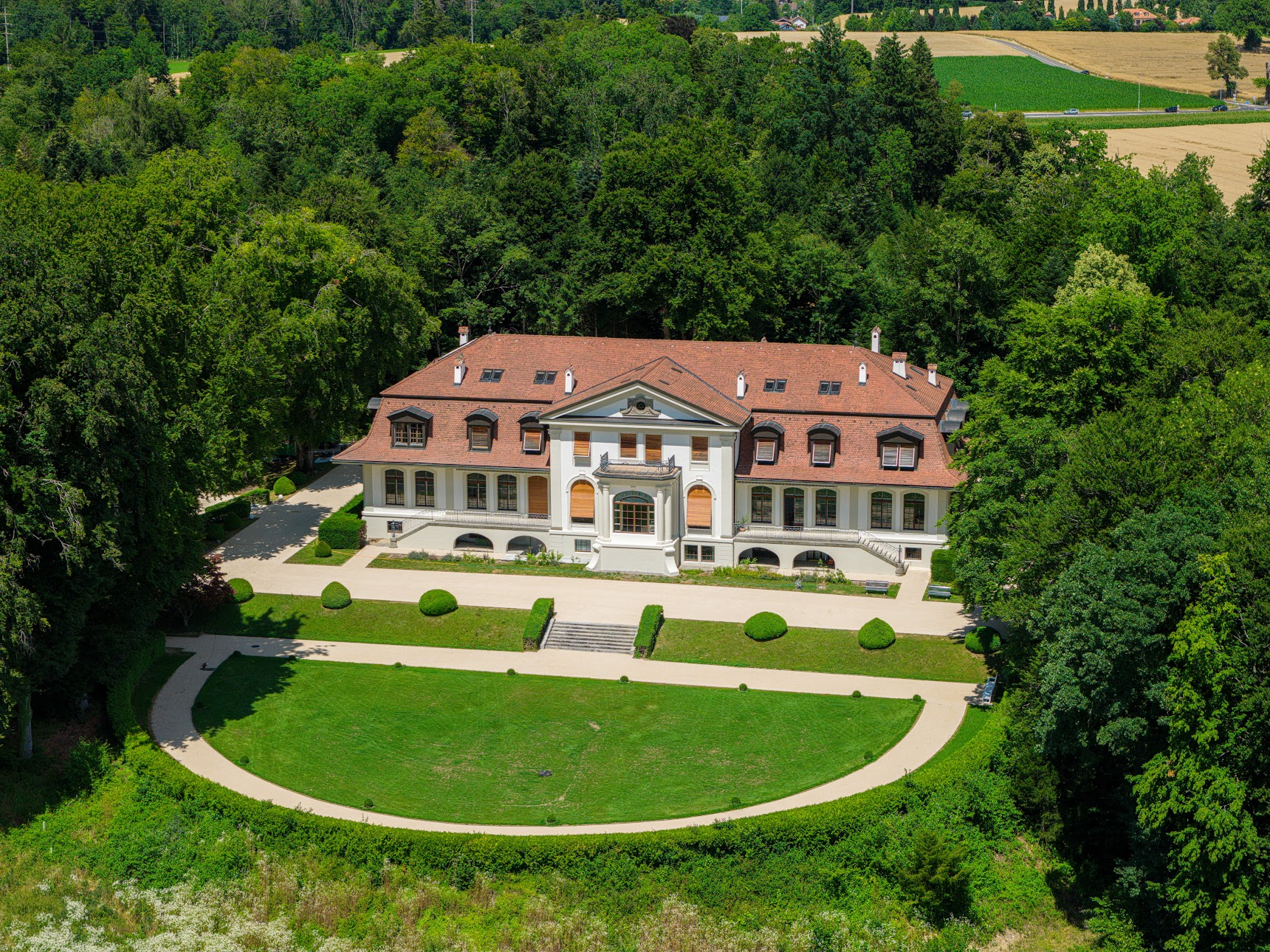
- Chateau de Bois Murat (front view)

- Location within Switzerland
- Interactive map of the Château de Bois Murat area

General information
- Architectural style: Early 20th-century Fribourg residential architecture
- Location: Switzerland
- Coordinates: 46°47′27″N 7°05′48″E
- Owner: d’Oultremont family

Design and construction
- Architects: Adolphe Burnat; Achille Duchêne

Website
- chateaudu-boismurat.ch

The Château de Bois Murat is a historic estate located about 4 kilometres southwest of Fribourg, Switzerland, between the hamlets of Bugnon and Nonan. The château covers an area of around 27 hectares, and is situated on a wooded hill that spans the municipalities of Matran and Corminbœuf. It is bordered to the north by a cantonal road.

== History ==
The Château de Bois Murat's landscape was designed between 1910 and 1912 by the French landscape architect Achille Duchêne, under the commission of Count Abel-Henri-Georges Armand. The design was intended to highlight the site’s elevated position and provide views of the Fribourg Prealps. The original garden layout and planting plan remain largely preserved.

The château itself was designed by Adolphe Burnat, a Swiss architect from Vevey, known for his work in historical restorations. Construction of the château was completed in June 1910.

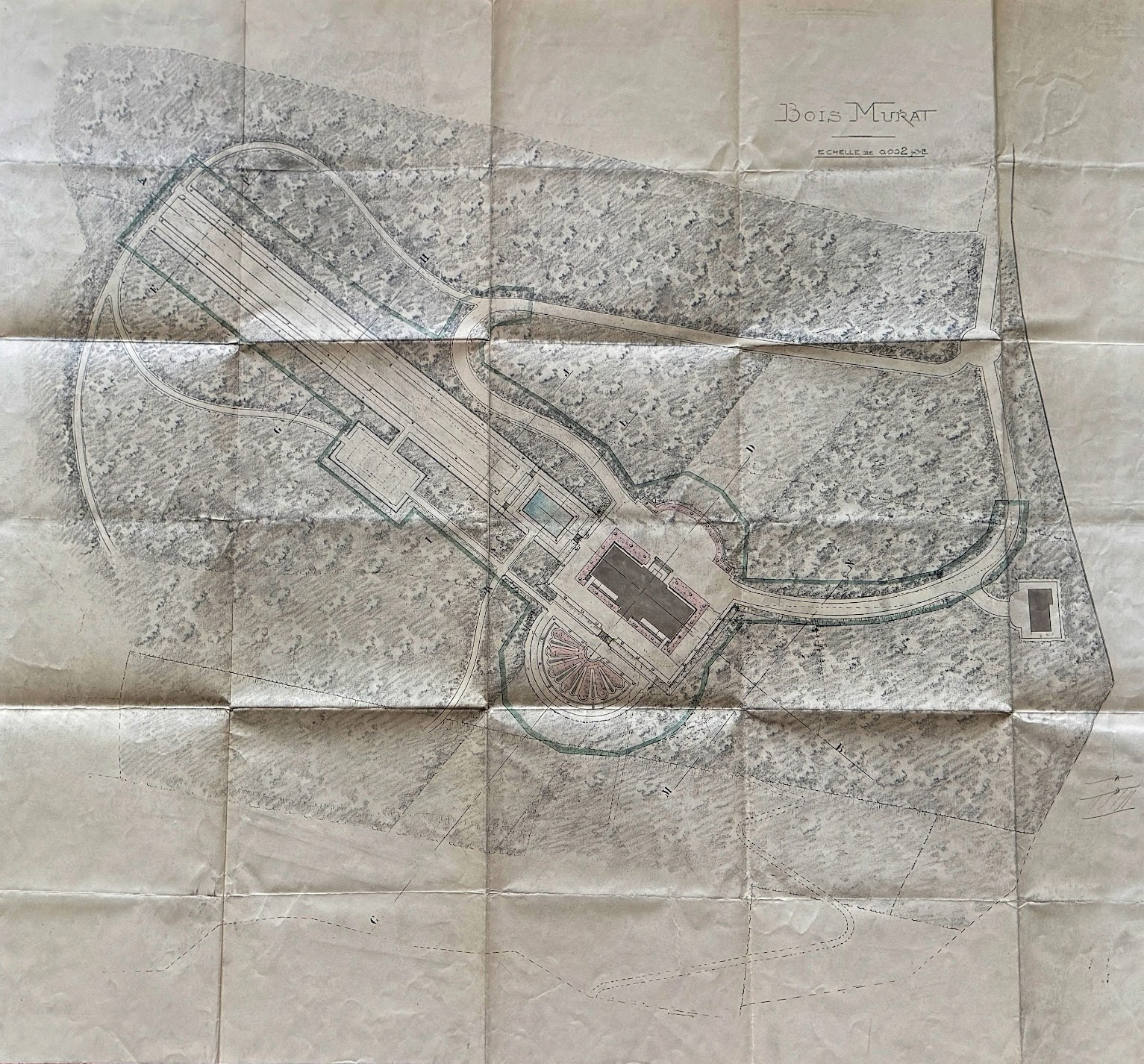
Original plan of Bois Murat

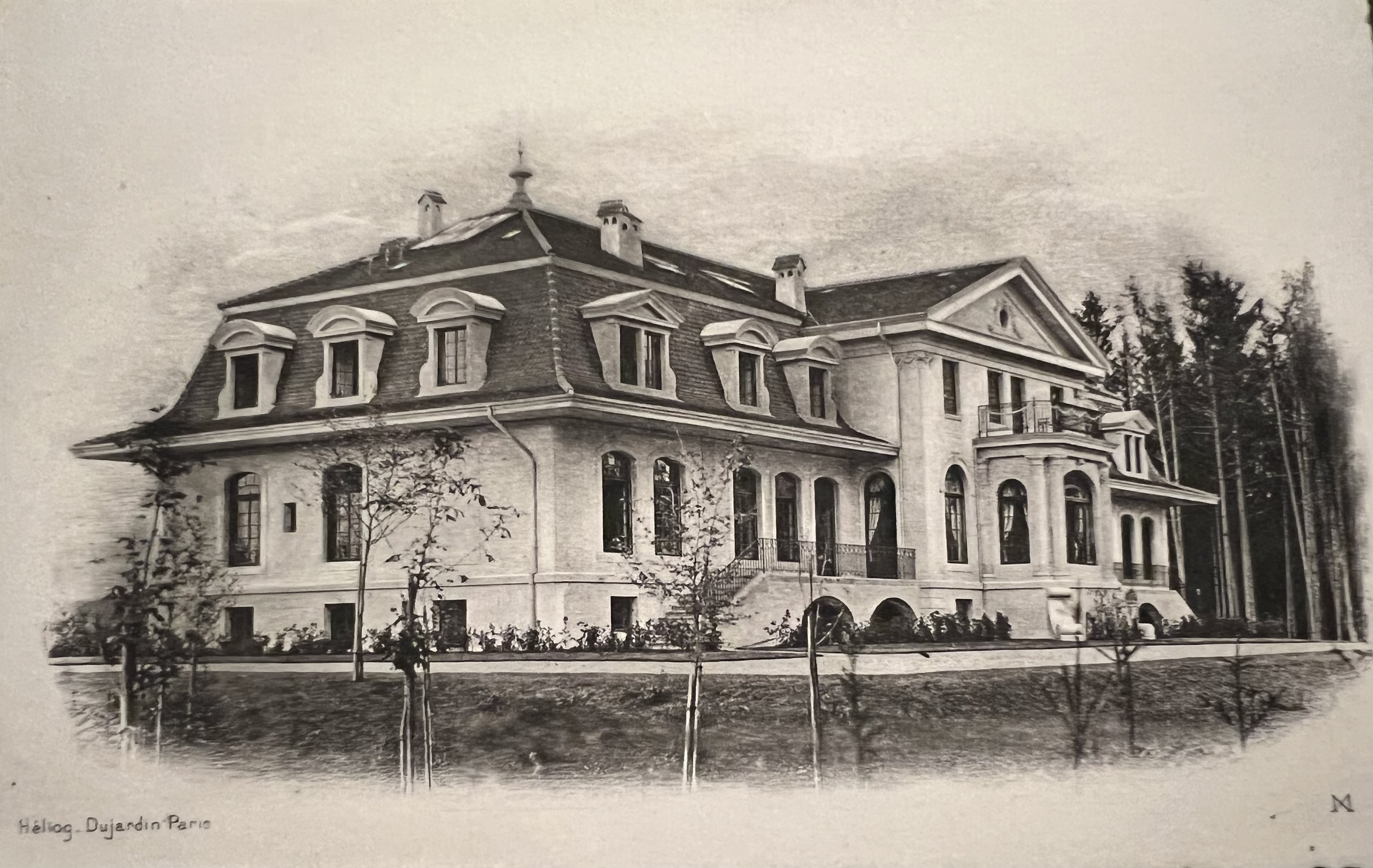
Postcard Héliog. Dujardin Paris, Bois Murat Archives.

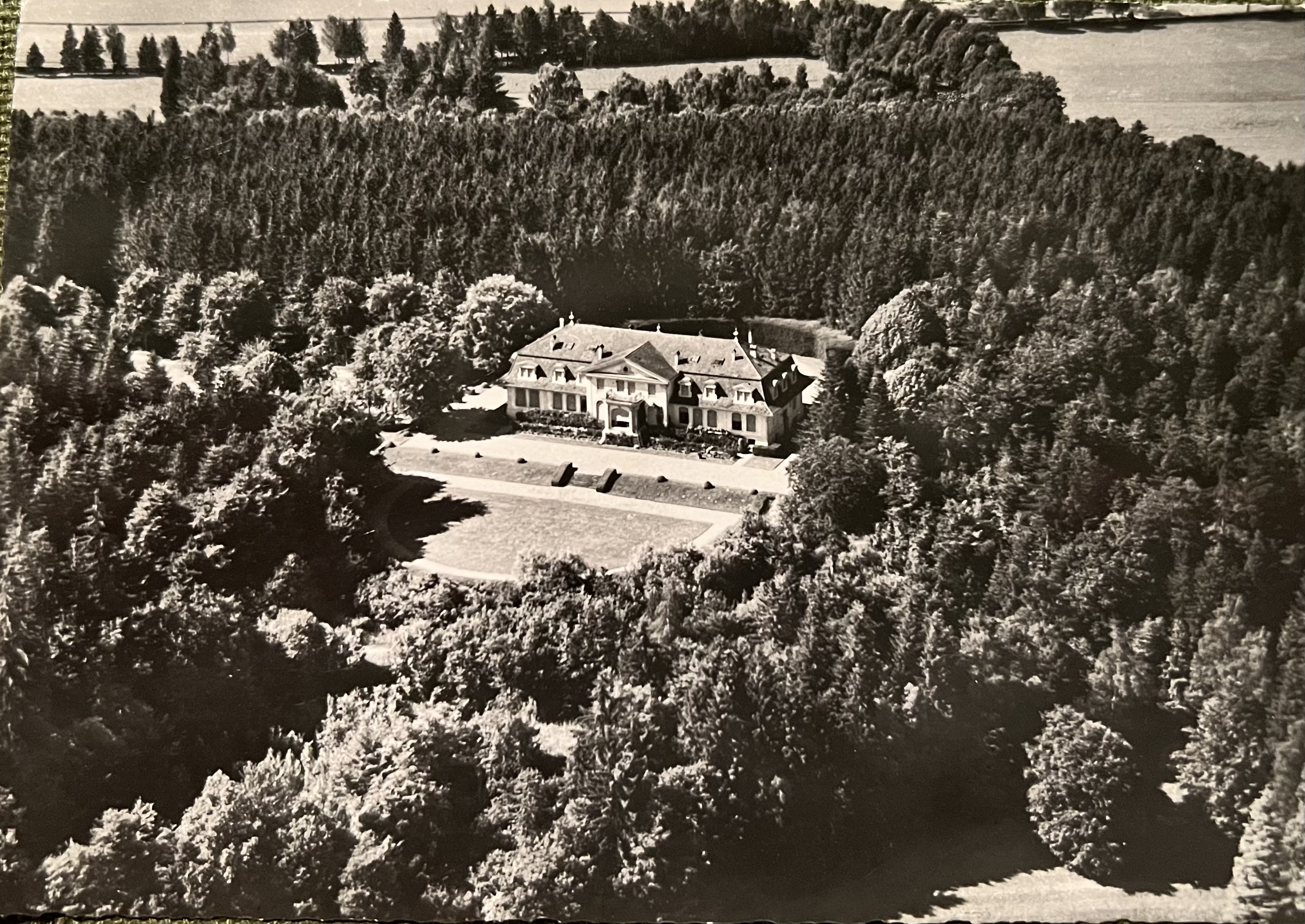
Aerial view of Bois Murat and its forest park, around 1960, Bois Murat Archives.

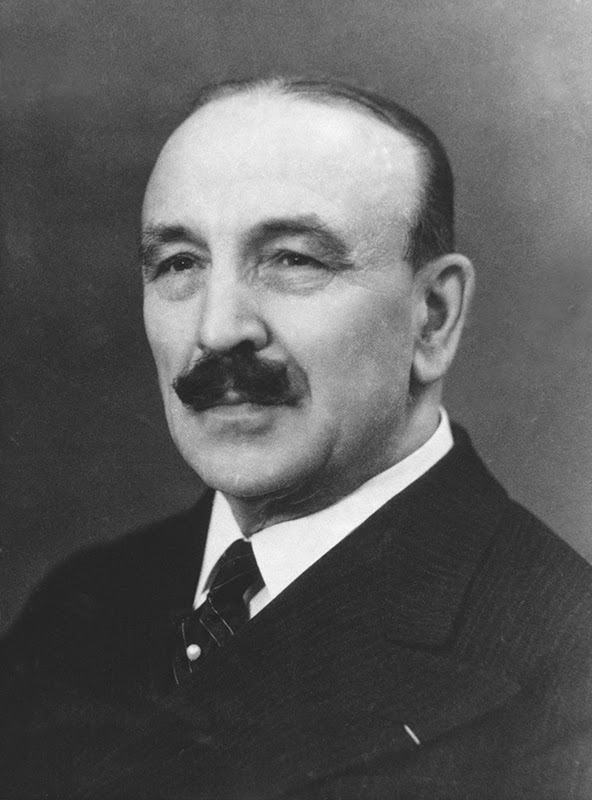
Portrait d’Achille Duchêne.

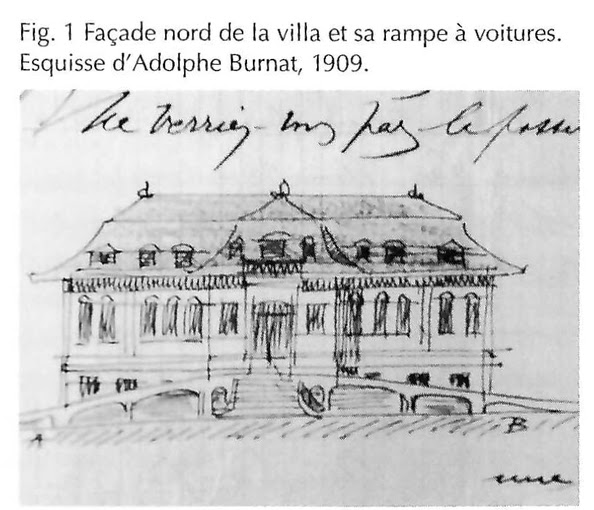
North facade of the villa and its carriage ramp. Sketch by Adolphe Burnat, 1909.

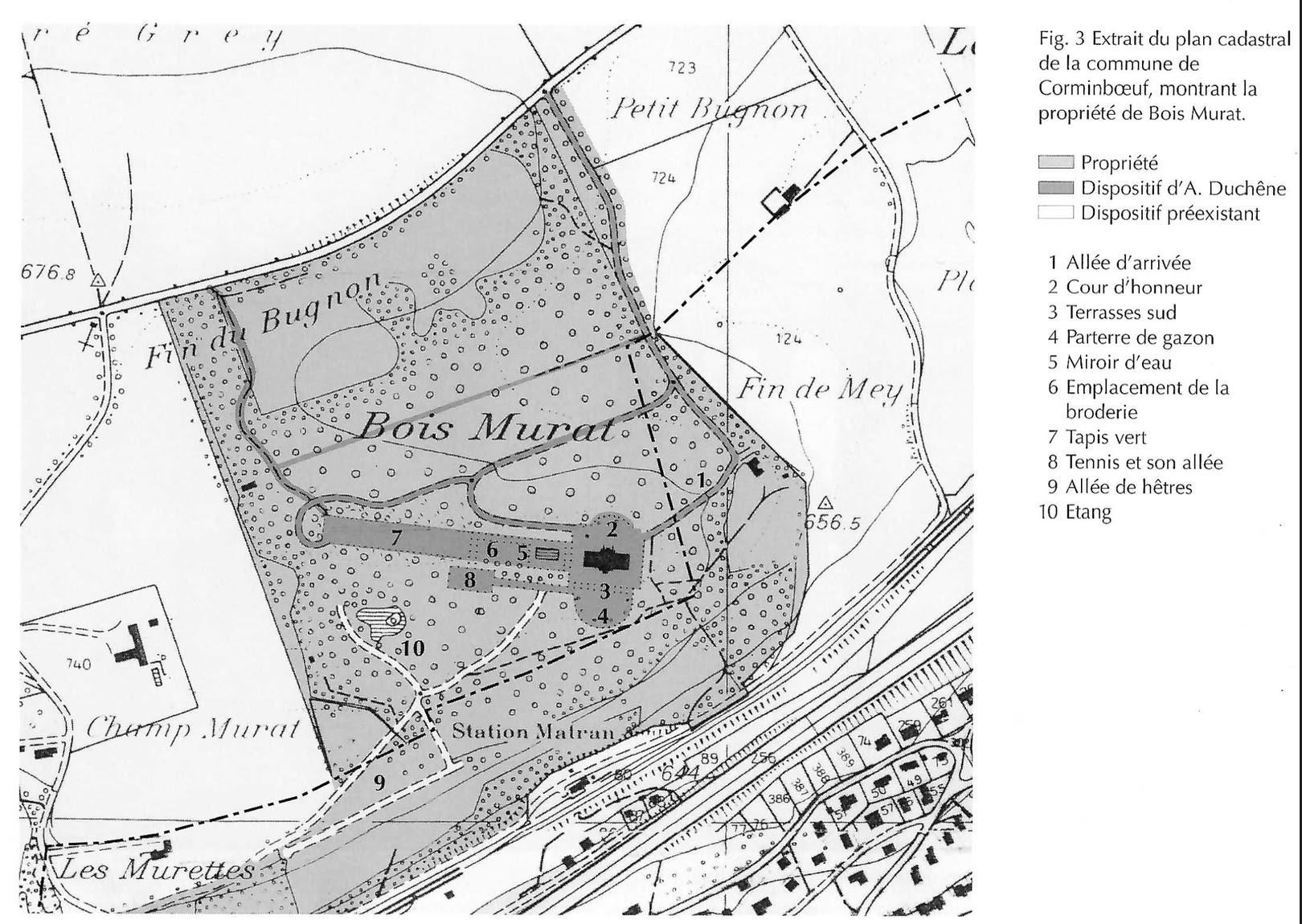
Excerpt from the cadastral map of the municipality of Corminboeuf, showing the Bois Murat property.

=== Archaeological significance ===
In 1909, during the early construction phase of the Château de Bois Murat, an Iron Age burial mound was discovered on the northern part of the site. Archaeological investigations identified it as a Hallstatt culture tumulus (c. 700–450 BCE).

The excavated mound consisted of large, tightly packed pebbles forming an oval structure measuring approximately 15.8 by 19.2 metres, covered by a mass of earth. Finds from the site included nineteen bronze sheet plates and a solid bronze leg, which Henri Breuil considered to be part of a statuette of Mediterranean origin, possibly from Sardinia or northern Italy. Subsequent research has reinterpreted the object as a support for a bronze container. Other discoveries comprised bronze and iron fragments, as well as traces of decomposed containers made of wood or clay. Archaeologists concluded that the mound represented the remains of a previously looted burial.

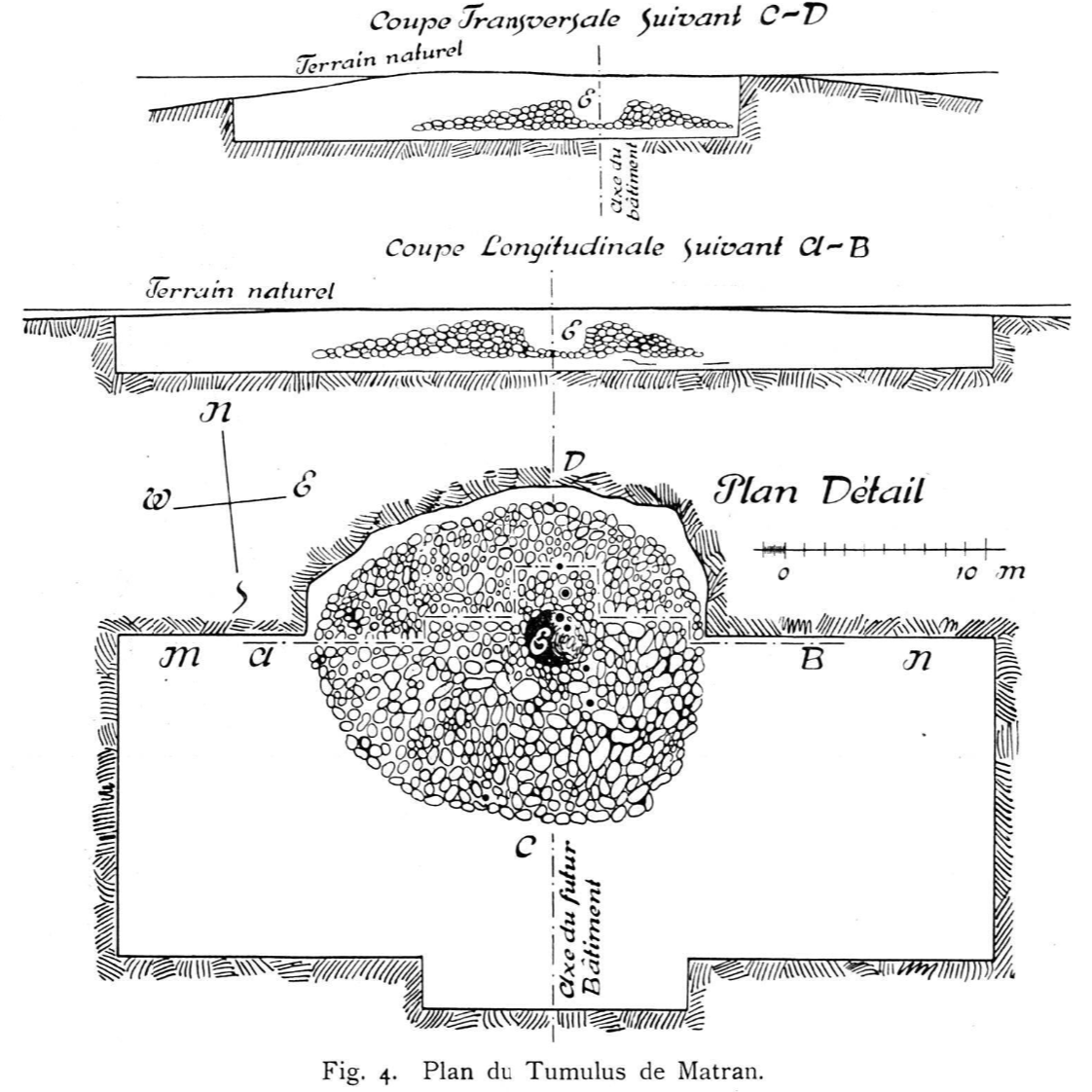
Plan of the Matran Tumulus.

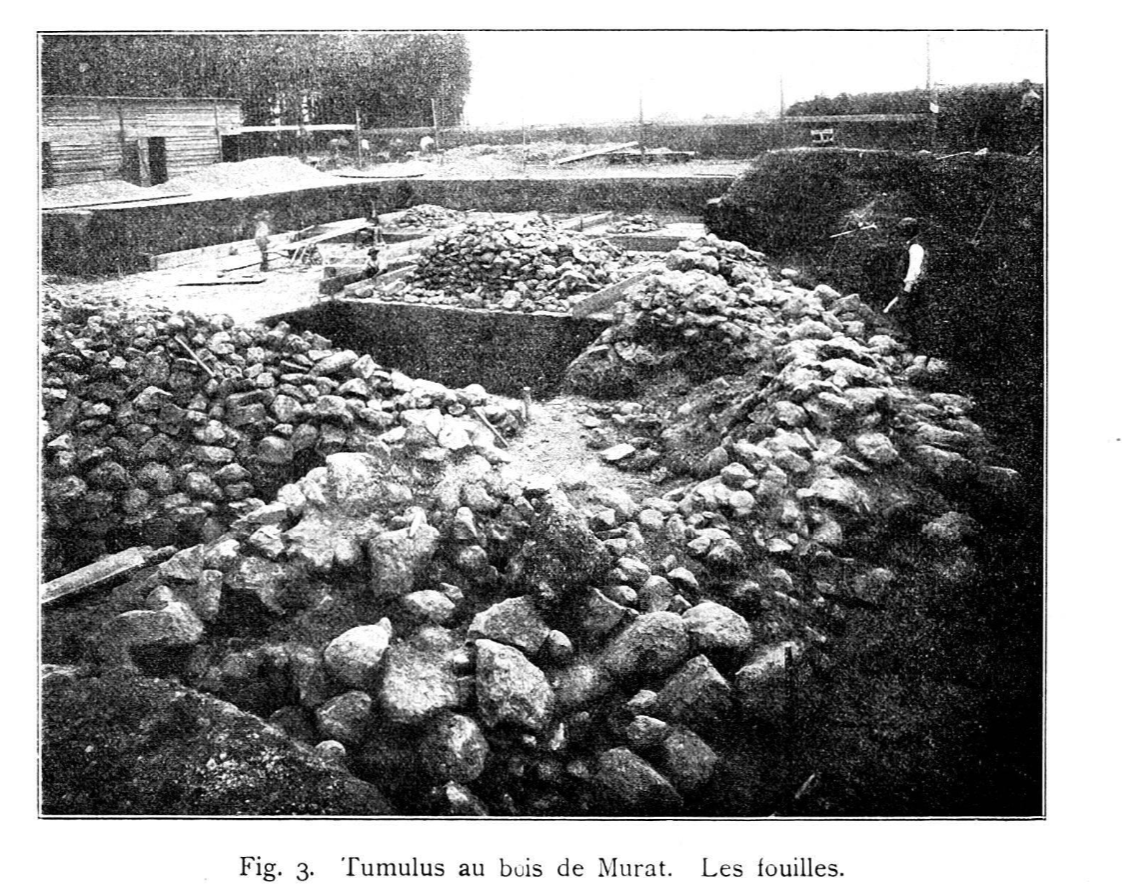
Tumulus in the Bois de Murat. The excavations.

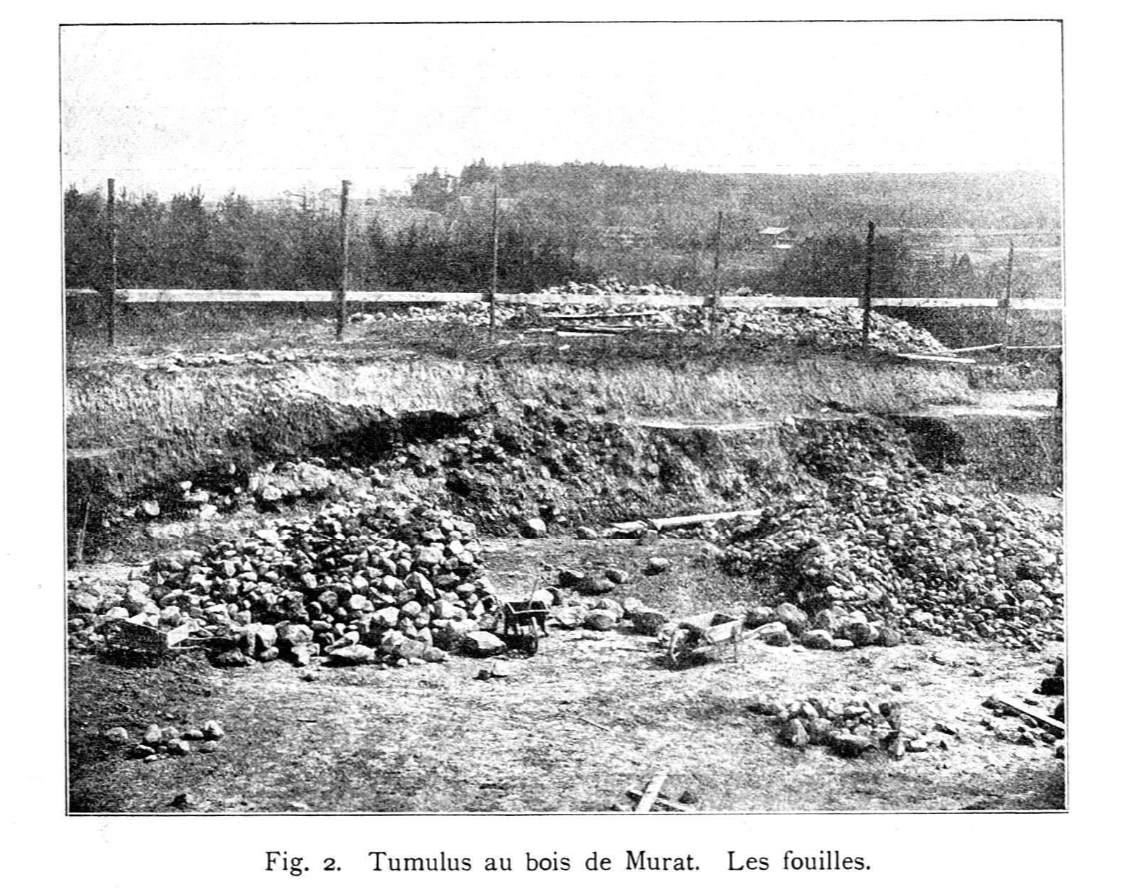
Tumulus in the Bois de Murat. The excavations.

=== First World War ===
In 1917, the Château de Bois Murat hosted a confidential diplomatic meeting referred to as the "Revertera–Armand" conference, involving participants from Austria, France, Italy, and Switzerland.

=== Heritage status ===
In 2006, the gardens of the Château de Bois Murat were included in the Federal Inventory of Built Sites of National Importance to be Protected in Switzerland (ISOS). The listing recognizes their significance as the only known example of Achille Duchêne’s work in Switzerland.

=== Ownership and restoration ===
The château has remained in the private ownership of twin brothers Stanislas and Laurent d’Oultremont, descendants of one of Belgium's oldest families, since its construction. A major restoration project began in 2024 and was completed in 2025. The project focused on preserving the architectural integrity of the villa and the historical layout of the gardens. Following the restoration, the château was made available for limited cultural and private functions.

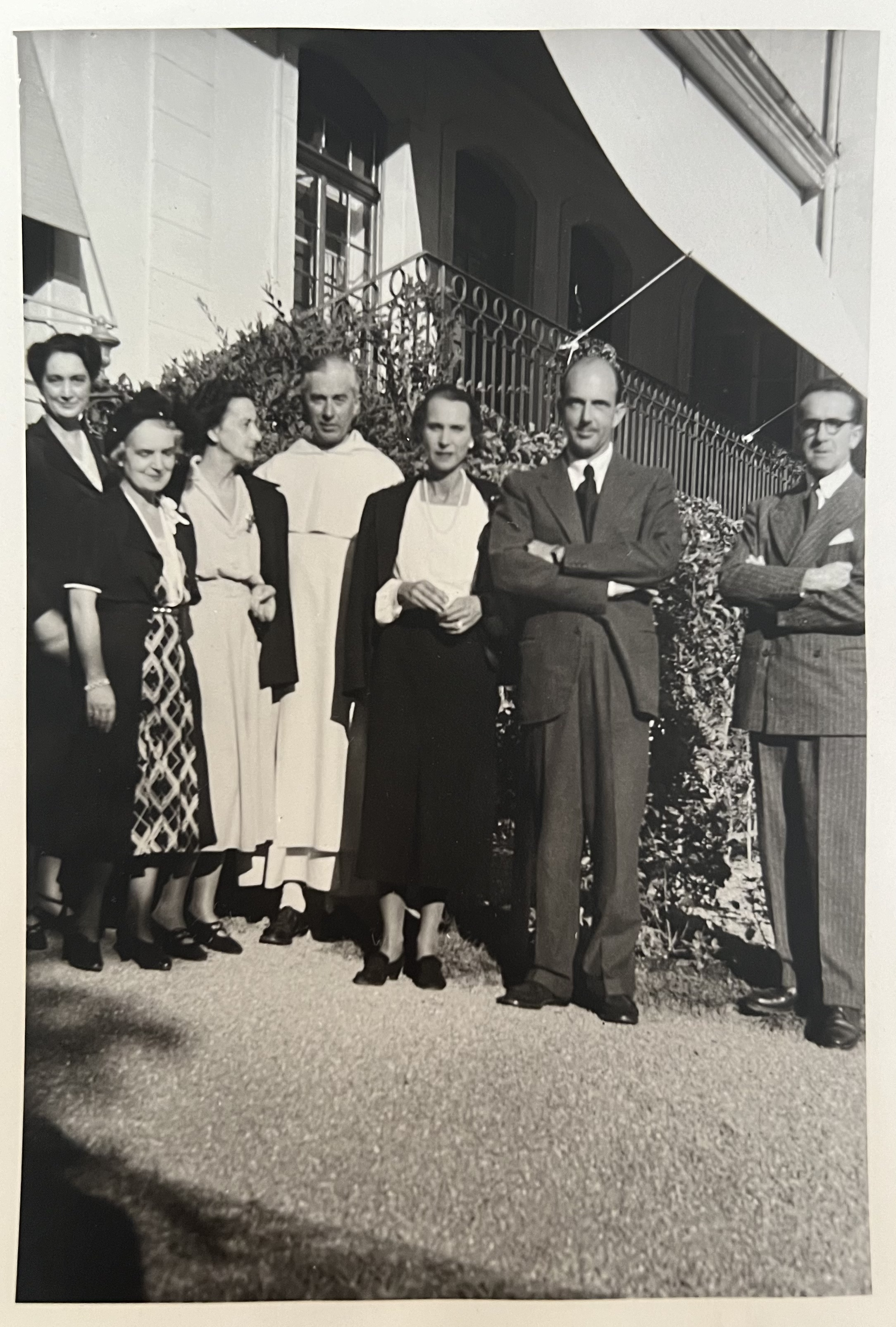
Photo archives: Le Bois Murat around 1947.Visit of king Umberto II of Italy and his wife the Queen Marie-José.

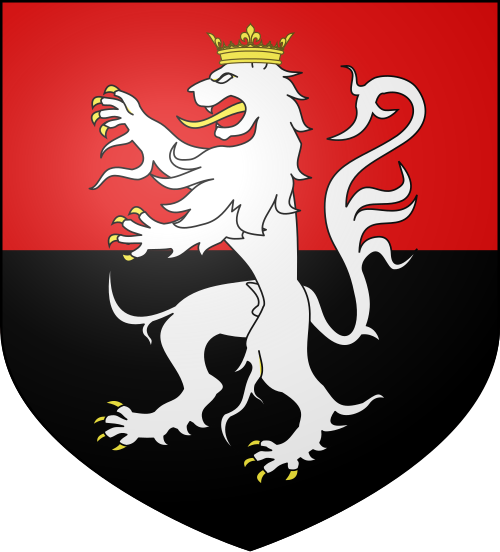
Coat of arms of the d’Oultremont family.

== Design ==
The garden layout spans approximately 33,280 square metres, with about 24,700 square metres comprising terraces, pathways, and green spaces. Notable features include:

- A series of terraces on three levels surrounding the main villa;
- A west-facing reflecting pool aligned with a 200-metre lawn;
- A tennis court enclosed by hornbeam hedges;
- Pathways composed of sand and macadam, bordered by symmetrically planted trees;
- Sculpted granite staircases, formal boxwood plantings, and stone benches.

Duchêne’s design at Bois Murat reflects his so-called "mixed garden style", which sought to blend formal French garden traditions with English landscape principles. The château has been cited as a rare Swiss example of the architectural garden movement of the early 20th century.

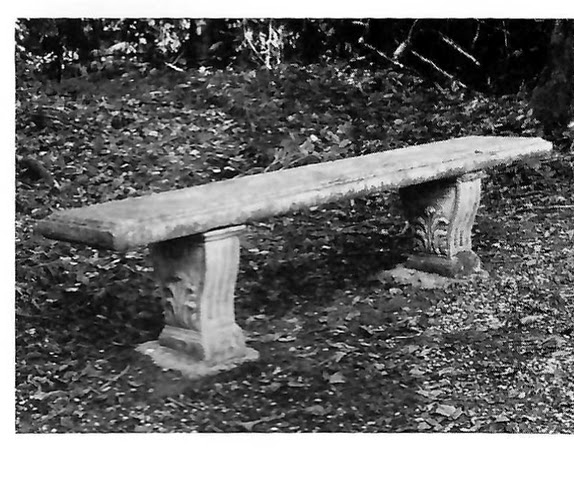
A garden bench by Achille Duchêne.

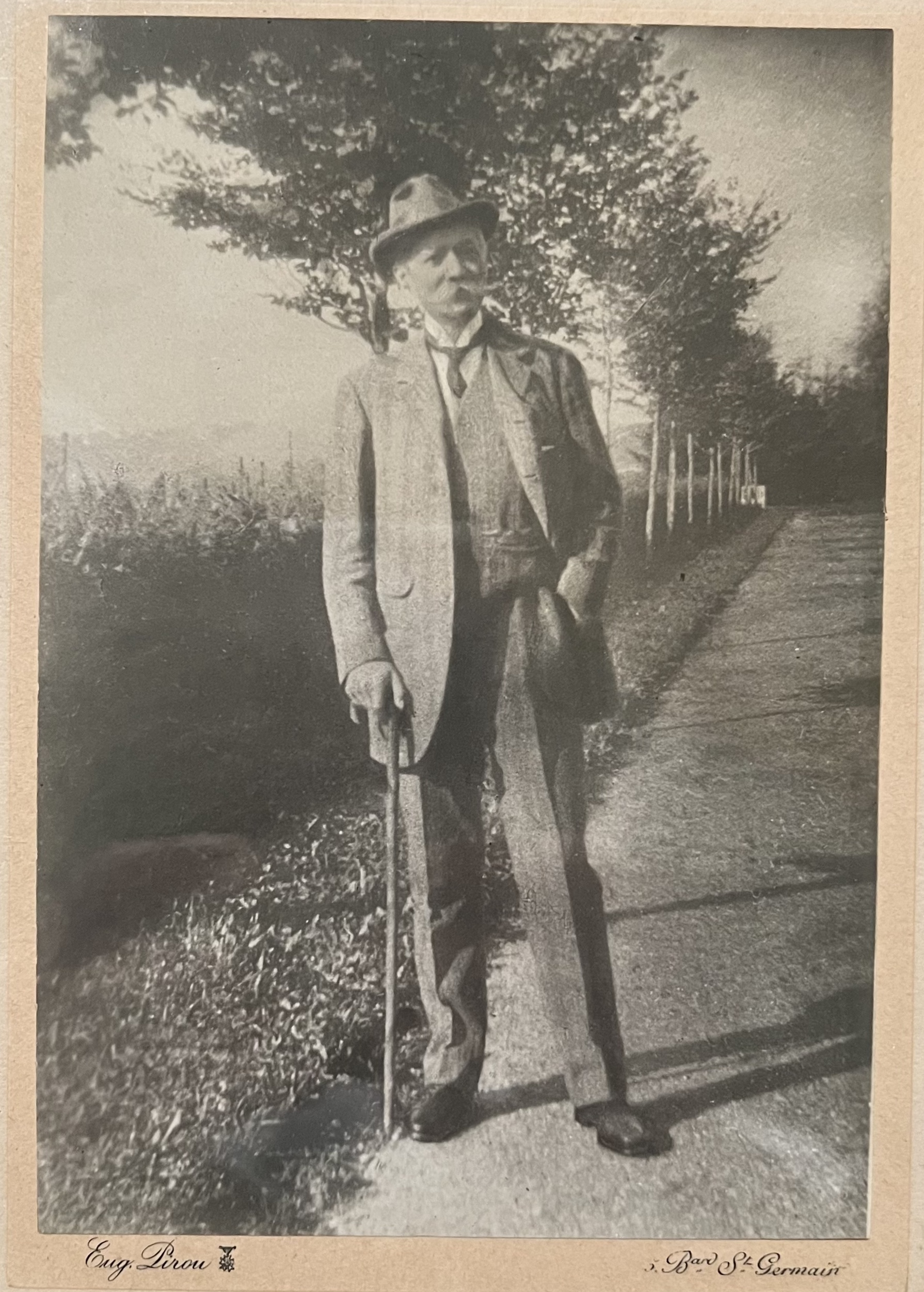
Count Abel Armand in the Grand Alley of Bois Murat at the beginning of the last century.

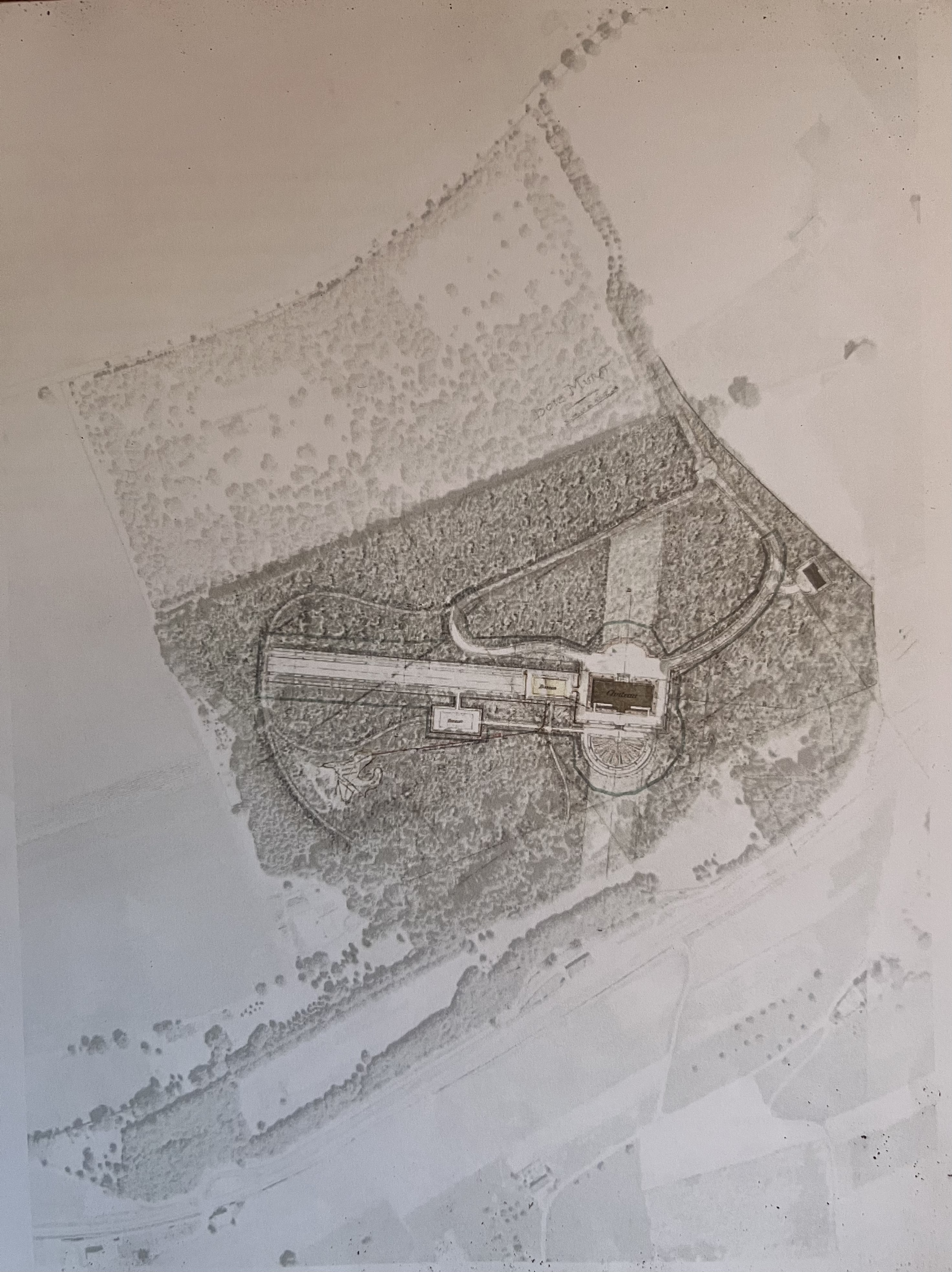
Original Achille Duchêne plan from 1909 overlaid on an aerial view from 1934. Le Bois Murat archives.

== See also ==
- Peace efforts during World War I
- Inventory of Swiss Heritage Sites
- Architecture of Switzerland
