= Baillival Castle (Corbières) =

Castle in Corbières, Switzerland

- Corbières
- Baillival Castle

Site information
- Code: CH-FR

Location
- Coordinates: 46°39′37″N 7°05′58″E

Baillival Castle (Corbières) is a bailiff's castle in the municipality of Corbières of the Canton of Fribourg in Switzerland. It is a Swiss heritage site of national significance.

== See also ==
- List of castles in Switzerland
- Château
