= Baillival Castle (Surpierre) =

Castle in Fribourg, Switzerland

Surpierre Castle
- Baillival Castle
- Surpierre
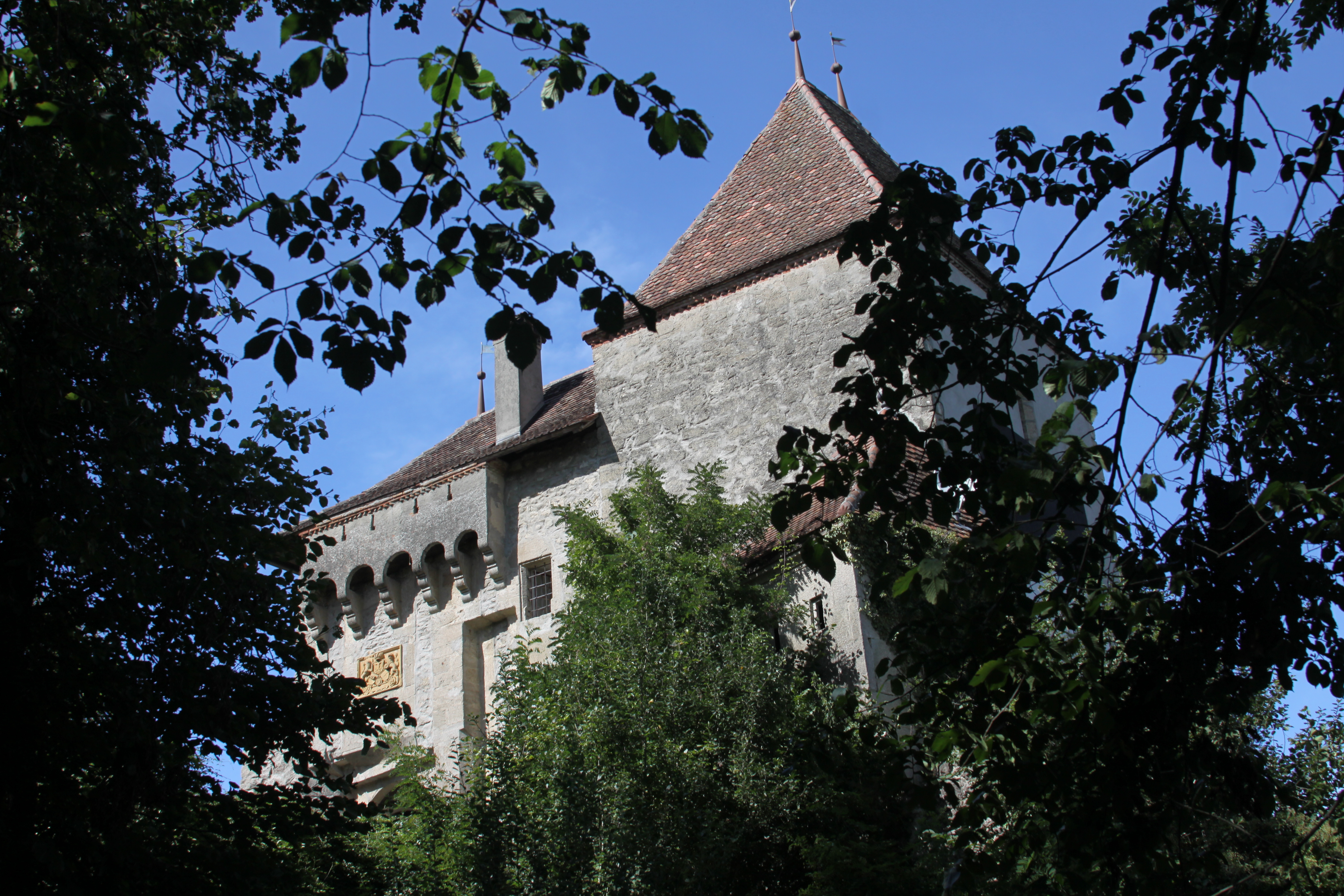
- Baillival Castle

Site information
- Code: CH-FR

Location
- Coordinates: 46°44′42″N 6°51′50″E

Site history
- Built: 13th century

Baillival Castle (Surpierre) is a bailiff's castle in the municipality of Surpierre of the Canton of Fribourg in Switzerland. It is a Swiss heritage site of national significance.

== History ==
In the 12th century there was a fort at Surpetra, though whether that was at the current castle site or another nearby location is unknown. The fief of Surpierre was owned by a noble family of the same name from 1142 until 1233. In the 13th century the de Cossonay family owned Surpierre and a number of surrounding villages. In the late 13th century a small castle was built on the site of the current one. A few elements of this castle were incorporated into the modern castle, including a square tower and the pointed arch windows in the chapel. By 1344 there was a small fortified village on the hill by the castle. During the 14th and 15th centuries the castle passed through a number of different owners. In 1476 and again in 1539 the castle was severely damaged in fires.

In 1536 the cantons of Bern, Fribourg and Valais invaded Vaud and defeated the Savoyard forces. On 21 February 1536 Surpierre was captured by Bern, who then gave it to Fribourg on 1 March, creating a small exclave. Under Fribourg's rule, a bailiff was appointed and granted authority over the land around Surpierre. The castle was rebuilt into a home for the Fribourg bailiff. In 1544 the castle was damaged in a fire, and the Fribourg authorities decided to rebuild it from its medieval design into an imposing government center and a comfortable home for the bailiff. Several additional buildings were added to the complex and an ornate main gate was added. A drawbridge was added over the dry moat and gardens were built around the castle. Over the following centuries, the Fribourg appointed bailiffs ruled over the exclave.

In 1848 the little Fribourg exclave became part of the Broye District and the district purchased the castle. Two years later, in 1850, it was acquired by the Marseille merchant Victor-Henri Leenhart-Imer. After passing through several owners, in 1951 Max Bürki bought it from the Delpech family.

== See also ==
- List of castles in Switzerland
- Château
