= Romont Castle =

Castle in Romont, Switzerland

- Romont
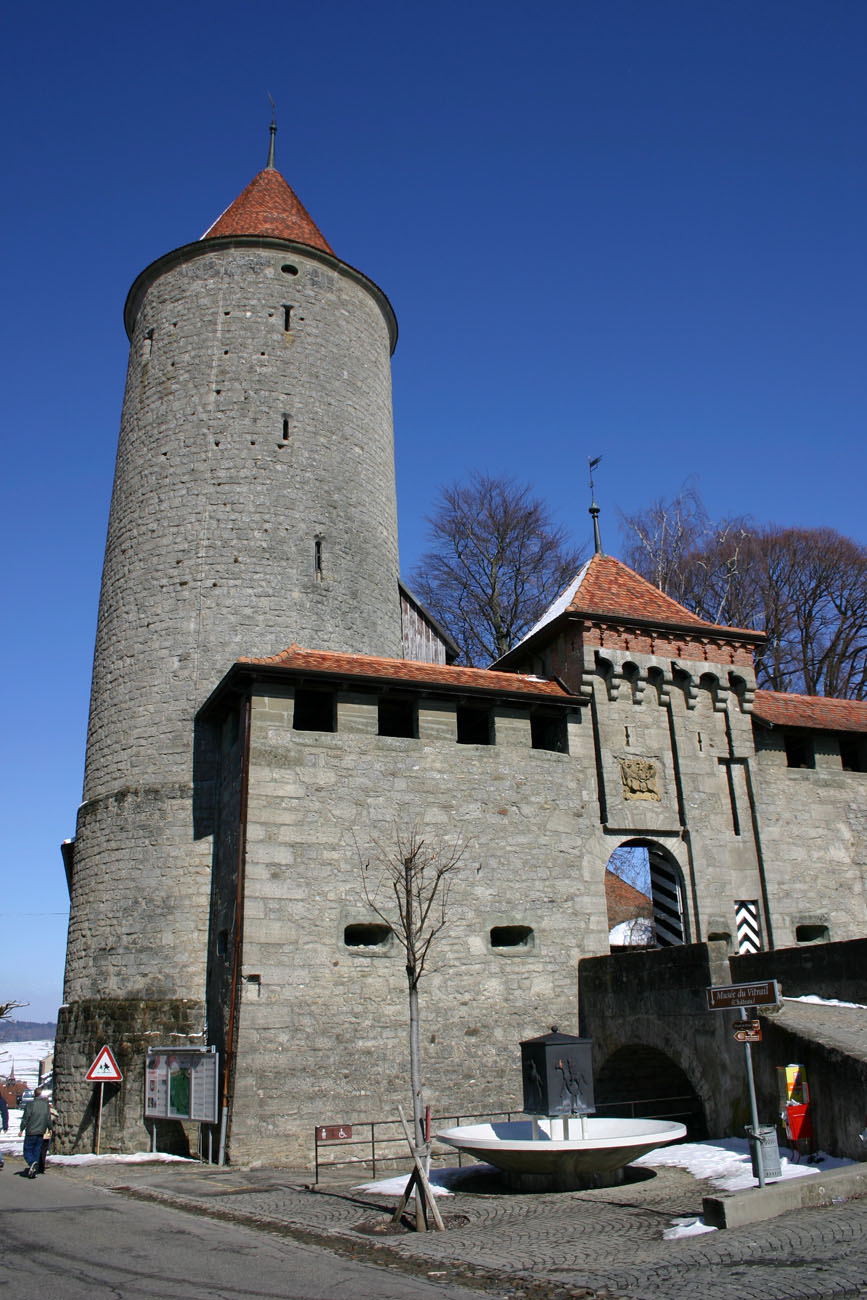
- Romont Castle

Site information
- Type: Hill castle
- Code: CH-FR

Location
- Coordinates: 46°41′40″N 6°55′07″E

Site history
- Built: before 1260

Romont Castle is a castle in the municipality of Romont of the Canton of Fribourg in Switzerland. It is a Swiss heritage site of national significance.

== See also ==
- List of castles in Switzerland
- Château
