= Valbroye =

- Municipality
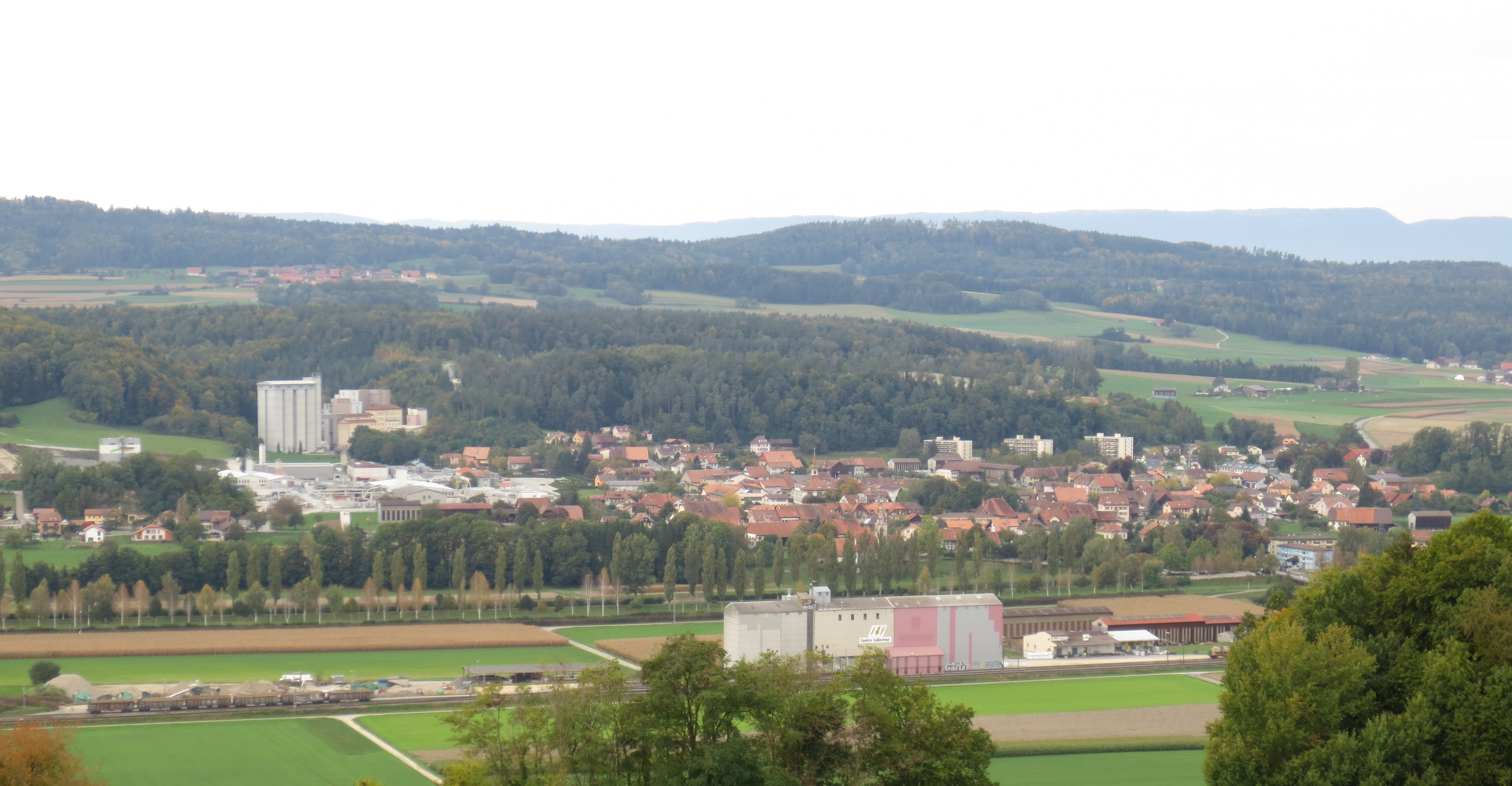
- Granges-près-Marnand and Sassel

- Flag Coat of arms
- Location of Valbroye
- Location within Switzerland Location within Canton of Vaud
- Coordinates: 46°43′N 6°54′E
- Country: Switzerland
- Canton: Vaud
- District: Broye-Vully

Government
  - Mayor: Syndic

Area
  - Total: 33.61 km^{2} (12.98 sq mi)

Population (2009)
  - Total: 119
  - Density: 3.54/km^{2} (9.17/sq mi)
- Time zone: UTC+01:00 (CET)
  - Summer (DST): UTC+02:00 (CEST)
- SFOS number: 5831
- ISO 3166 code: CH-VD
- Surrounded by: Cerniaz, Dompierre, Romont (FR), Rossens, Sédeilles, Seigneux, Villarzel
- Website: http://www.valbroye.ch Profile (in French), SFSO statistics

Valbroye is a municipality in the district of Broye-Vully in the canton of Vaud in Switzerland.

The villages of Cerniaz, Combremont-le-Grand, Combremont-le-Petit, Granges-près-Marnand, Marnand, Sassel, Seigneux and Villars-Bramard merged on 1 July 2011 into the new municipality of Valbroye.

== History ==
Cerniaz is first mentioned in 1444 as Sernia. Combremont-le-Grand is first mentioned in 911 as Cumbromo. In 1142 it was mentioned as Combremont. Combremont-le-Petit is first mentioned in 911 as Cumbromo. In 1142 it was mentioned as Combremont. Granges-près-Marnand is first mentioned in 881 as in fine Graniacense. In 1228 it was mentioned as Granges. The current name was adopted in 1952. Marnand is first mentioned in 1142 as Marnant. Sassel is first mentioned in 1177 as Sases. Seigneux is first mentioned around 1216-50 as Simuus.

== Geography ==
Valbroye has an area, as of 2009, of 33.61 square kilometers (12.98 mi^{2}). Of this area, 22.41 km^{2} (8.65 mi^{2}) or 66.7% is used for agricultural purposes, while 8.49 km^{2} (3.28 mi^{2}) or 25.3% is forested. Of the rest of the land, 2.43 km^{2} (0.94 mi^{2}) or 7.2% is settled (buildings or roads), 0.17 km^{2} (0.066 mi^{2}) or 0.5% is either rivers or lakes.

== Coat of Arms ==
The blazon of the municipal coat of arms is Per fess, 1: Paly of six, Argent and Gules, 2: Paly of six, Gules and Argent, overall a Bridge Sable masoned Argent, and in base Barry of six wavy Argent and Azure.

== Historic Population ==
The historical population is given in the following chart:

== Transportation ==
The municipality has a railway station, Granges-Marnand, on the Palézieux–Lyss railway line. It has regular service to Lausanne, Palézieux, Payerne, and Kerzers.

== Sights ==
The entire villages of Combremont-le-Petit, Granges-près-Marnand and Sassel are designated as part of the Inventory of Swiss Heritage Sites.
