= Combremont =

Combremont may refer to:

- Combremont-le-Grand, Vaud, Switzerland
- Combremont-le-Petit, Vaud, Switzerland
