= Payerne District =

Coordinates: 46°49′N 6°56′E

Arms of Payerne (district)

Payerne District was a district of the canton of Vaud in Switzerland.

== Mergers and name changes ==
- On 1 July 2006, Rossens and Sédeilles merged into the municipality of Villarzel.
- On 1 September 2006 the municipalities of Cerniaz (VD), Champtauroz, Chevroux, Combremont-le-Grand, Combremont-le-Petit, Corcelles-près-Payerne, Grandcour, Granges-près-Marnand, Henniez, Marnand, Missy, Payerne, Sassel, Seigneux, Trey, Treytorrens (Payerne), Villars-Bramard and Villarzel came from the District de Payerne to join the Broye-Vully District.

== Municipalities ==
- Cerniaz
- Champtauroz
- Chevroux
- Combremont-le-Grand
- Combremont-le-Petit
- Grandcour
- Granges-près-Marnand
- Henniez
- Marnand
- Missy
- Payerne
- Rossens
- Sassel
- Sédeilles
- Seigneux
- Trey
- Treytorrens
- Villars-Bramard
- Villarzel
