= Seigneux =

- Former municipality
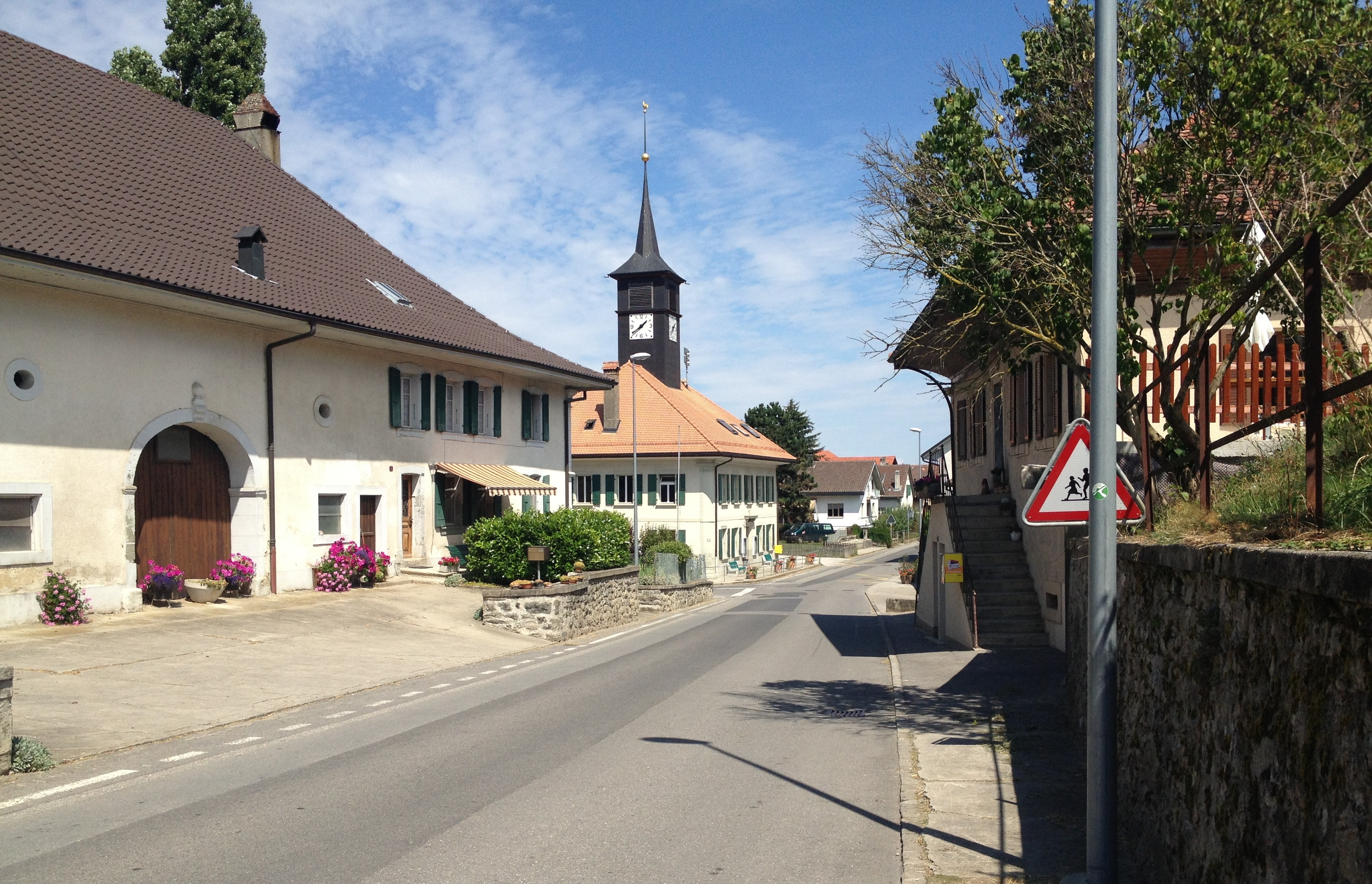

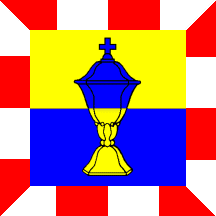
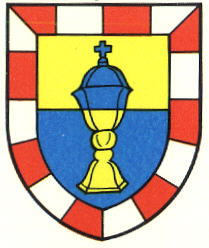
- Flag Coat of arms
- Location of Seigneux
- Location within Switzerland Location within Canton of Vaud
- Coordinates: 46°44′N 6°53′E
- Country: Switzerland
- Canton: Vaud
- District: Broye-Vully

Area
  - Total: 3.72 km^{2} (1.44 sq mi)
- Elevation: 570 m (1,870 ft)

Population (2009)
  - Total: 296
  - Density: 79.6/km^{2} (206/sq mi)
- Time zone: UTC+01:00 (CET)
  - Summer (DST): UTC+02:00 (CEST)
- Postal code: 1525
- SFOS number: 5826
- ISO 3166 code: CH-VD
- Surrounded by: Cerniaz, Curtilles, Dompierre, Henniez, Lucens, Villars-Bramard, Villeneuve (FR)
- Website: Profile (in French), SFSO statistics

Seigneux is a former municipality in the district of Broye-Vully in the canton of Vaud in Switzerland.

The villages of Cerniaz, Combremont-le-Grand, Combremont-le-Petit, Granges-près-Marnand, Marnand, Sassel, Seigneux and Villars-Bramard merged on 1 July 2011 into the new municipality of Valbroye.

== History ==
Seigneux is first mentioned around 1216-50 as Simuus.

== Geography ==
Seigneux has an area, as of 2009, of 3.7 square kilometers (1.4 mi^{2}). Of this area, 2.25 km^{2} (0.87 mi^{2}) or 60.2% is used for agricultural purposes, while 1.19 km^{2} (0.46 mi^{2}) or 31.8% is forested. Of the rest of the land, 0.26 km^{2} (0.10 mi^{2}) or 7.0% is settled (buildings or roads).

Of the built up area, housing and buildings made up 2.4% and transportation infrastructure made up 3.2%. Out of the forested land, 29.1% of the total land area is heavily forested and 2.7% is covered with orchards or small clusters of trees. Of the agricultural land, 43.0% is used for growing crops and 15.8% is pastures, while 1.3% is used for orchards or vine crops.

The municipality was part of the Payerne District until it was dissolved on 31 August 2006, and Seigneux became part of the new district of Broye-Vully.

== Coat of arms ==
The blazon of the municipal coat of arms is Per fess Or and Azure, a ciborium counterchanged, bordered Gules and Argent.

== Demographics ==
Seigneux has a population (As of December 2009) of 296. As of 2008, 8.7% of the population are resident foreign nationals. Over the last 10 years (1999-2009 ) the population has changed at a rate of 2.8%. It has changed at a rate of -2.8% due to migration and at a rate of 5.2% due to births and deaths.

Most of the population (as of 2000) speaks French (260 or 94.2%), with Portuguese being second most common (6 or 2.2%) and German being third (5 or 1.8%). There are 3 people who speak Italian.

Of the population in the village 91 or about 33.0% were born in Seigneux and lived there in 2000. There were 106 or 38.4% who were born in the same canton, while 47 or 17.0% were born somewhere else in Switzerland, and 27 or 9.8% were born outside of Switzerland.

In 2008 there were 4 live births to Swiss citizens and were 3 deaths of Swiss citizens. Ignoring immigration and emigration, the population of Swiss citizens increased by 1 while the foreign population remained the same. There was 1 Swiss woman who emigrated from Switzerland. At the same time, there was 1 non-Swiss man and 3 non-Swiss women who immigrated from another country to Switzerland. The total Swiss population change in 2008 (from all sources, including moves across municipal borders) was an increase of 3 and the non-Swiss population decreased by 2 people. This represents a population growth rate of 0.3%.

The age distribution, as of 2009, in Seigneux is; 31 children or 10.5% of the population are between 0 and 9 years old and 51 teenagers or 17.3% are between 10 and 19. Of the adult population, 38 people or 12.9% of the population are between 20 and 29 years old. 36 people or 12.2% are between 30 and 39, 51 people or 17.3% are between 40 and 49, and 41 people or 13.9% are between 50 and 59. The senior population distribution is 23 people or 7.8% of the population are between 60 and 69 years old, 15 people or 5.1% are between 70 and 79, there are 7 people or 2.4% who are between 80 and 89, and there is 1 person who is 90 and older.

As of 2000, there were 117 people who were single and never married in the village. There were 131 married individuals, 12 widows or widowers and 16 individuals who are divorced.

As of 2000 the average number of residents per living room was 0.6 which is about equal to the cantonal average of 0.61 per room. In this case, a room is defined as space of a housing unit of at least 4 m² (43 sq ft) as normal bedrooms, dining rooms, living rooms, kitchens and habitable cellars and attics. About 61.2% of the total households were owner occupied, or in other words did not pay rent (though they may have a mortgage or a rent-to-own agreement).

As of 2000, there were 104 private households in the village, and an average of 2.6 persons per household. There were 24 households that consist of only one person and 9 households with five or more people. Out of a total of 105 households that answered this question, 22.9% were households made up of just one person and there was 1 adult who lived with their parents. Of the rest of the households, there are 29 married couples without children, 43 married couples with children There were 5 single parents with a child or children. There were 2 households that were made up of unrelated people and 1 household that was made up of some sort of institution or another collective housing.

In 2000 there were 52 single family homes (or 57.8% of the total) out of a total of 90 inhabited buildings. There were 12 multi-family buildings (13.3%), along with 21 multi-purpose buildings that were mostly used for housing (23.3%) and 5 other use buildings (commercial or industrial) that also had some housing (5.6%). Of the single family homes 19 were built before 1919, while 4 were built between 1990 and 2000. The greatest number of multi-family homes (3) were built between 1919 and 1945 and again between 1946 and 1960

In 2000 there were 125 apartments in the village. The most common apartment size was 5 rooms of which there were 34. There were 8 single room apartments and 53 apartments with five or more rooms. Of these apartments, a total of 98 apartments (78.4% of the total) were permanently occupied, while 20 apartments (16.0%) were seasonally occupied and 7 apartments (5.6%) were empty. As of 2009, the construction rate of new housing units was 0 new units per 1000 residents. The vacancy rate for the village, in 2010, was 0%.

The historical population is given in the following chart:

== Politics ==
In the 2007 federal election the most popular party was the SVP which received 34.42% of the vote. The next three most popular parties were the SP (25.99%), the FDP (13.29%) and the LPS Party (8.01%). In the federal election, a total of 97 votes were cast, and the voter turnout was 50.5%.

== Economy ==
As of 2010, Seigneux had an unemployment rate of 1.6%. As of 2008, there were 19 people employed in the primary economic sector and about 8 businesses involved in this sector. 19 people were employed in the secondary sector and there were 5 businesses in this sector. 20 people were employed in the tertiary sector, with 10 businesses in this sector. There were 140 residents of the village who were employed in some capacity, of which females made up 41.4% of the workforce.

In 2008 the total number of full-time equivalent jobs was 45. The number of jobs in the primary sector was 12, all of which were in agriculture. The number of jobs in the secondary sector was 17 of which 13 or (76.5%) were in manufacturing and 4 (23.5%) were in construction. The number of jobs in the tertiary sector was 16. In the tertiary sector; 13 or 81.3% were in the sale or repair of motor vehicles, 1 was a technical professional or scientist, 1 was in education.

In 2000, there were 81 workers who commuted into the village and 102 workers who commuted away. The village is a net exporter of workers, with about 1.3 workers leaving the village for every one entering. Of the working population, 4.3% used public transportation to get to work, and 72.1% used a private car.

== Religion ==
From the 2000 census, 79 or 28.6% were Roman Catholic, while 155 or 56.2% belonged to the Swiss Reformed Church. Of the rest of the population, there was 1 member of an Orthodox church, and there were 14 individuals (or about 5.07% of the population) who belonged to another Christian church. There was 1 person who was Buddhist. 23 (or about 8.33% of the population) belonged to no church, are agnostic or atheist, and 10 individuals (or about 3.62% of the population) did not answer the question.

== Education ==
In Seigneux about 105 or (38.0%) of the population have completed non-mandatory upper secondary education, and 27 or (9.8%) have completed additional higher education (either University or a Fachhochschule). Of the 27 who completed tertiary schooling, 55.6% were Swiss men, 25.9% were Swiss women.

In the 2009/2010 school year there were a total of 46 students in the Seigneux school district. In the Vaud cantonal school system, two years of non-obligatory pre-school are provided by the political districts. During the school year, the political district provided pre-school care for a total of 155 children of which 83 children (53.5%) received subsidized pre-school care. The canton's primary school program requires students to attend for four years. There were 20 students in the municipal primary school program. The obligatory lower secondary school program lasts for six years and there were 26 students in those schools.

As of 2000, there were 9 students in Seigneux who came from another village, while 36 residents attended schools outside the village.
