= Granges-près-Marnand =

- Former municipality
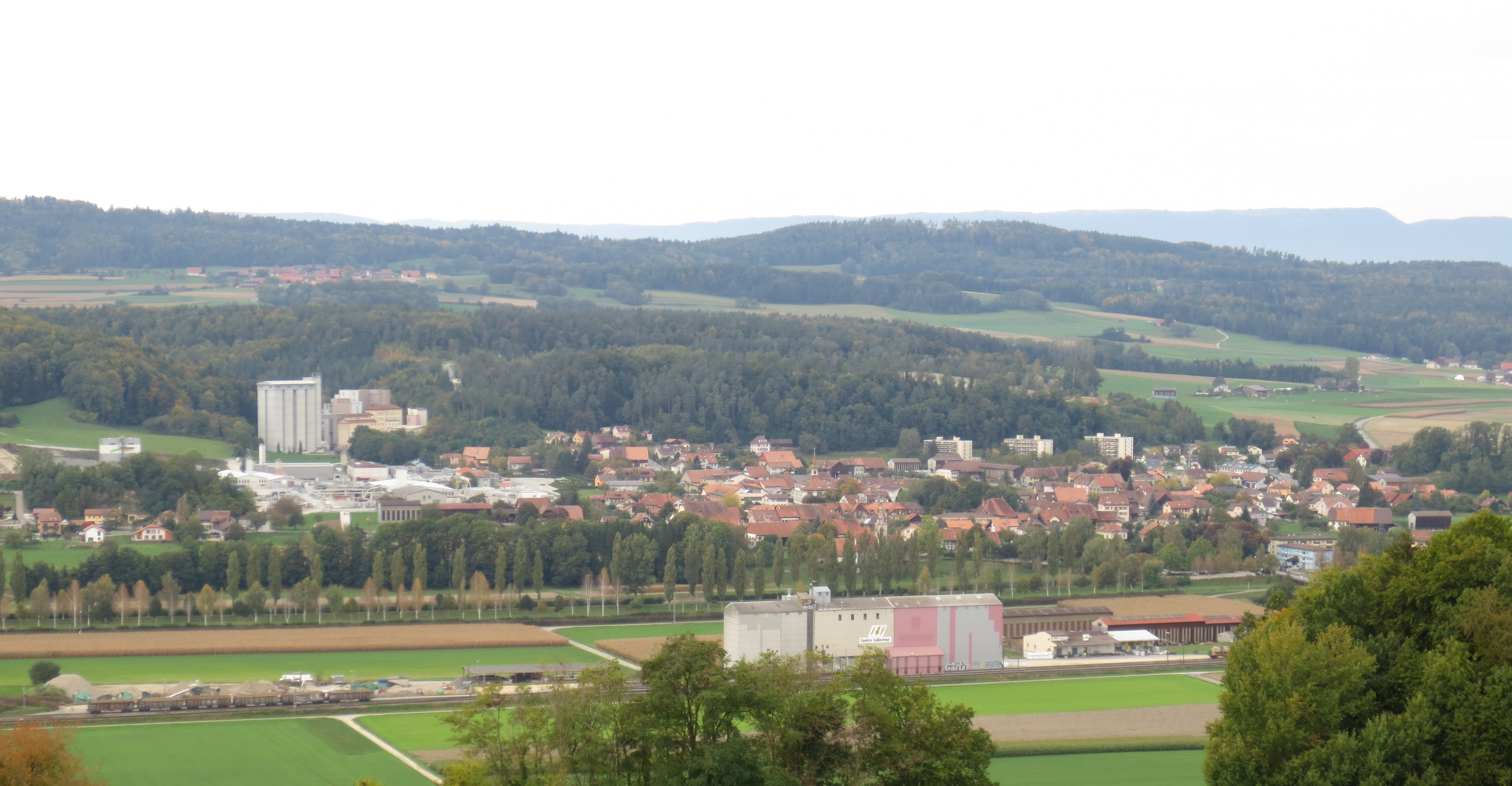

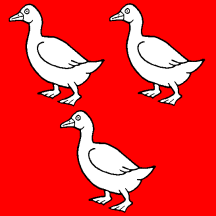
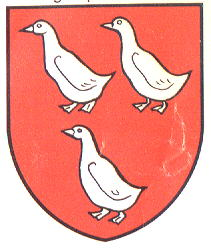
- Flag Coat of arms
- Location of Granges-près-Marnand
- Location within Switzerland Location within Canton of Vaud
- Coordinates: 46°46′N 6°53′E
- Country: Switzerland
- Canton: Vaud
- District: Broye-Vully

Area
  - Total: 7.02 km^{2} (2.71 sq mi)
- Elevation: 473 m (1,552 ft)

Population (2009)
  - Total: 1,210
  - Density: 172/km^{2} (446/sq mi)
- Time zone: UTC+01:00 (CET)
  - Summer (DST): UTC+02:00 (CEST)
- Postal code: 1523
- SFOS number: 5818
- ISO 3166 code: CH-VD
- Surrounded by: Cheiry (FR), Fétigny-Ménières (FR), Henniez, Marnand, Sassel, Surpierre (FR), Trey, Villeneuve (FR)
- Website: Profile (in French), SFSO statistics

Granges-près-Marnand is a former municipality in the district of Broye-Vully in the canton of Vaud in Switzerland.

The municipalities of Cerniaz, Combremont-le-Grand, Combremont-le-Petit, Granges-près-Marnand, Marnand, Sassel, Seigneux and Villars-Bramard merged on 1 July 2011 into the new municipality of Valbroye.

== History ==
Granges-près-Marnand is first mentioned in 881 as in fine Graniacense. In 1228 it was mentioned as Granges. The current name was adopted in 1952.

== Geography ==
Granges-près-Marnand has an area, as of 2009, of 7.02 square kilometers (2.71 sq mi). Of this area, 4.47 km^{2} (1.73 sq mi) or 63.7% is used for agricultural purposes, while 1.5 km^{2} (0.58 sq mi) or 21.4% is forested. Of the rest of the land, 0.91 km^{2} (0.35 sq mi) or 13.0% is settled (buildings or roads), 0.15 km^{2} (37 acres) or 2.1% is either rivers or lakes.

Of the built up area, industrial buildings made up 2.1% of the total area while housing and buildings made up 4.4% and transportation infrastructure made up 3.3%. Power and water infrastructure as well as other special developed areas made up 2.6% of the area Out of the forested land, 20.2% of the total land area is heavily forested and 1.1% is covered with orchards or small clusters of trees. Of the agricultural land, 53.4% is used for growing crops and 9.7% is pastures. All the water in the municipality is flowing water.

The municipality was part of the Payerne District until it was dissolved on 31 August 2006, and Granges-près-Marnand became part of the new district of Broye-Vully.

The municipality is located on the left bank of the Broye river. It consists of the village of Granges-près-Marnand and the hamlet of Brit.

== Coat of arms ==
The blazon of the municipal coat of arms is Gules, three Geese Argent.

== Demographics ==
Granges-près-Marnand has a population (as of 2009) of 1,210. As of 2008, 24.8% of the population are resident foreign nationals. Over the last 10 years (1999–2009 ) the population has changed at a rate of 5.9%. It has changed at a rate of 5.2% due to migration and at a rate of 1% due to births and deaths.

Most of the population (as of 2000) speaks French (976 or 85.2%), with Portuguese being second most common (43 or 3.8%) and Albanian being third (39 or 3.4%). There are 29 people who speak German, 36 people who speak Italian.

Of the population in the municipality 414 or about 36.1% were born in Granges-près-Marnand and lived there in 2000. There were 276 or 24.1% who were born in the same canton, while 177 or 15.4% were born somewhere else in Switzerland, and 261 or 22.8% were born outside of Switzerland.

In 2008 there were 8 live births to Swiss citizens and 3 births to non-Swiss citizens, and in same time span there were 10 deaths of Swiss citizens and 2 non-Swiss citizen deaths. Ignoring immigration and emigration, the population of Swiss citizens decreased by 2 while the foreign population increased by 1. There was 1 Swiss man who immigrated back to Switzerland. At the same time, there were 7 non-Swiss men and 11 non-Swiss women who immigrated from another country to Switzerland. The total Swiss population change in 2008 (from all sources, including moves across municipal borders) was a decrease of 2 and the non-Swiss population increased by 8 people. This represents a population growth rate of 0.5%.

The age distribution, as of 2009, in Granges-près-Marnand is; 123 children or 10.2% of the population are between 0 and 9 years old and 161 teenagers or 13.3% are between 10 and 19. Of the adult population, 183 people or 15.2% of the population are between 20 and 29 years old. 126 people or 10.4% are between 30 and 39, 170 people or 14.1% are between 40 and 49, and 179 people or 14.8% are between 50 and 59. The senior population distribution is 124 people or 10.3% of the population are between 60 and 69 years old, 78 people or 6.5% are between 70 and 79, there are 52 people or 4.3% who are between 80 and 89, and there are 11 people or 0.9% who are 90 and older.

As of 2000, there were 468 people who were single and never married in the municipality. There were 580 married individuals, 65 widows or widowers and 33 individuals who are divorced.

As of 2000 the average number of residents per living room was 0.61 which is about equal to the cantonal average of 0.61 per room. In this case, a room is defined as space of a housing unit of at least 4 m^{2} (43 sq ft) as normal bedrooms, dining rooms, living rooms, kitchens and habitable cellars and attics. About 39.6% of the total households were owner occupied, or in other words did not pay rent (though they may have a mortgage or a rent-to-own agreement).

As of 2000, there were 438 private households in the municipality, and an average of 2.5 persons per household. There were 134 households that consist of only one person and 51 households with five or more people. Out of a total of 452 households that answered this question, 29.6% were households made up of just one person and there were 2 adults who lived with their parents. Of the rest of the households, there are 113 married couples without children, 159 married couples with children There were 23 single parents with a child or children. There were 7 households that were made up of unrelated people and 14 households that were made up of some sort of institution or another collective housing.

In 2000 there were 123 single family homes (or 48.0% of the total) out of a total of 256 inhabited buildings. There were 60 multi-family buildings (23.4%), along with 58 multi-purpose buildings that were mostly used for housing (22.7%) and 15 other use buildings (commercial or industrial) that also had some housing (5.9%). Of the single family homes 38 were built before 1919, while 5 were built between 1990 and 2000. The most multi-family homes (32) were built before 1919 and the next most (7) were built between 1919 and 1945. There was 1 multi-family house built between 1996 and 2000.

In 2000 there were 547 apartments in the municipality. The most common apartment size was 3 rooms of which there were 169. There were 23 single room apartments and 161 apartments with five or more rooms. Of these apartments, a total of 437 apartments (79.9% of the total) were permanently occupied, while 79 apartments (14.4%) were seasonally occupied and 31 apartments (5.7%) were empty. As of 2009, the construction rate of new housing units was 7.4 new units per 1000 residents. The vacancy rate for the municipality, in 2010, was 0%.

The historical population is given in the following chart:

== Sights ==
The entire urban village of Granges-près-Marnand is designated as part of the Inventory of Swiss Heritage Sites.

== Politics ==
In the 2007 federal election the most popular party was the SVP which received 28.29% of the vote. The next three most popular parties were the FDP (25.04%), the SP (19.03%) and the Green Party (12.76%). In the federal election, a total of 327 votes were cast, and the voter turnout was 45.5%.

== Economy ==
As of 2010, Granges-près-Marnand had an unemployment rate of 4.2%. As of 2008, there were 79 people employed in the primary economic sector and about 16 businesses involved in this sector. 440 people were employed in the secondary sector and there were 18 businesses in this sector. 224 people were employed in the tertiary sector, with 39 businesses in this sector. There were 552 residents of the municipality who were employed in some capacity, of which females made up 38.9% of the workforce.

In 2008 the total number of full-time equivalent jobs was 642. The number of jobs in the primary sector was 43, all of which were in agriculture. The number of jobs in the secondary sector was 421 of which 276 or (65.6%) were in manufacturing and 145 (34.4%) were in construction. The number of jobs in the tertiary sector was 178. In the tertiary sector; 44 or 24.7% were in the sale or repair of motor vehicles, 49 or 27.5% were in the movement and storage of goods, 9 or 5.1% were in a hotel or restaurant, 3 or 1.7% were the insurance or financial industry, 30 or 16.9% were technical professionals or scientists, 29 or 16.3% were in education and 4 or 2.2% were in health care.

In 2000, there were 351 workers who commuted into the municipality and 274 workers who commuted away. The municipality is a net importer of workers, with about 1.3 workers entering the municipality for every one leaving. Of the working population, 8.7% used public transportation to get to work, and 53.8% used a private car.

== Religion ==
From the 2000 census, 418 or 36.5% were Roman Catholic, while 546 or 47.6% belonged to the Swiss Reformed Church. Of the rest of the population, there were 10 members of an Orthodox church (or about 0.87% of the population), and there were 2 individuals (or about 0.17% of the population) who belonged to another Christian church. There were 83 (or about 7.24% of the population) who were Islamic. 66 (or about 5.76% of the population) belonged to no church, are agnostic or atheist, and 21 individuals (or about 1.83% of the population) did not answer the question.

== Education ==
In Granges-près-Marnand about 338 or (29.5%) of the population have completed non-mandatory upper secondary education, and 110 or (9.6%) have completed additional higher education (either University or a Fachhochschule). Of the 110 who completed tertiary schooling, 66.4% were Swiss men, 27.3% were Swiss women and 5.5% were non-Swiss women.

In the 2009/2010 school year there were a total of 156 students in the Granges-près-Marnand school district. In the Vaud cantonal school system, two years of non-obligatory pre-school are provided by the political districts. During the school year, the political district provided pre-school care for a total of 155 children of which 83 children (53.5%) received subsidized pre-school care. The canton's primary school program requires students to attend for four years. There were 80 students in the municipal primary school program. The obligatory lower secondary school program lasts for six years and there were 74 students in those schools. There were also 2 students who were home schooled or attended another non-traditional school.

As of 2000, there were 147 students in Granges-près-Marnand who came from another municipality, while 101 residents attended schools outside the municipality.

== Transport ==
The municipality has a rail connection to the Réseau Express Vaudois network via the Palézieux–Payerne line. On 29 July 2013, two passenger trains on the line suffered a head-on collision at Granges-près-Marnand, causing at least 35 injuries and one fatality.
