= Marnand =

- Former municipality
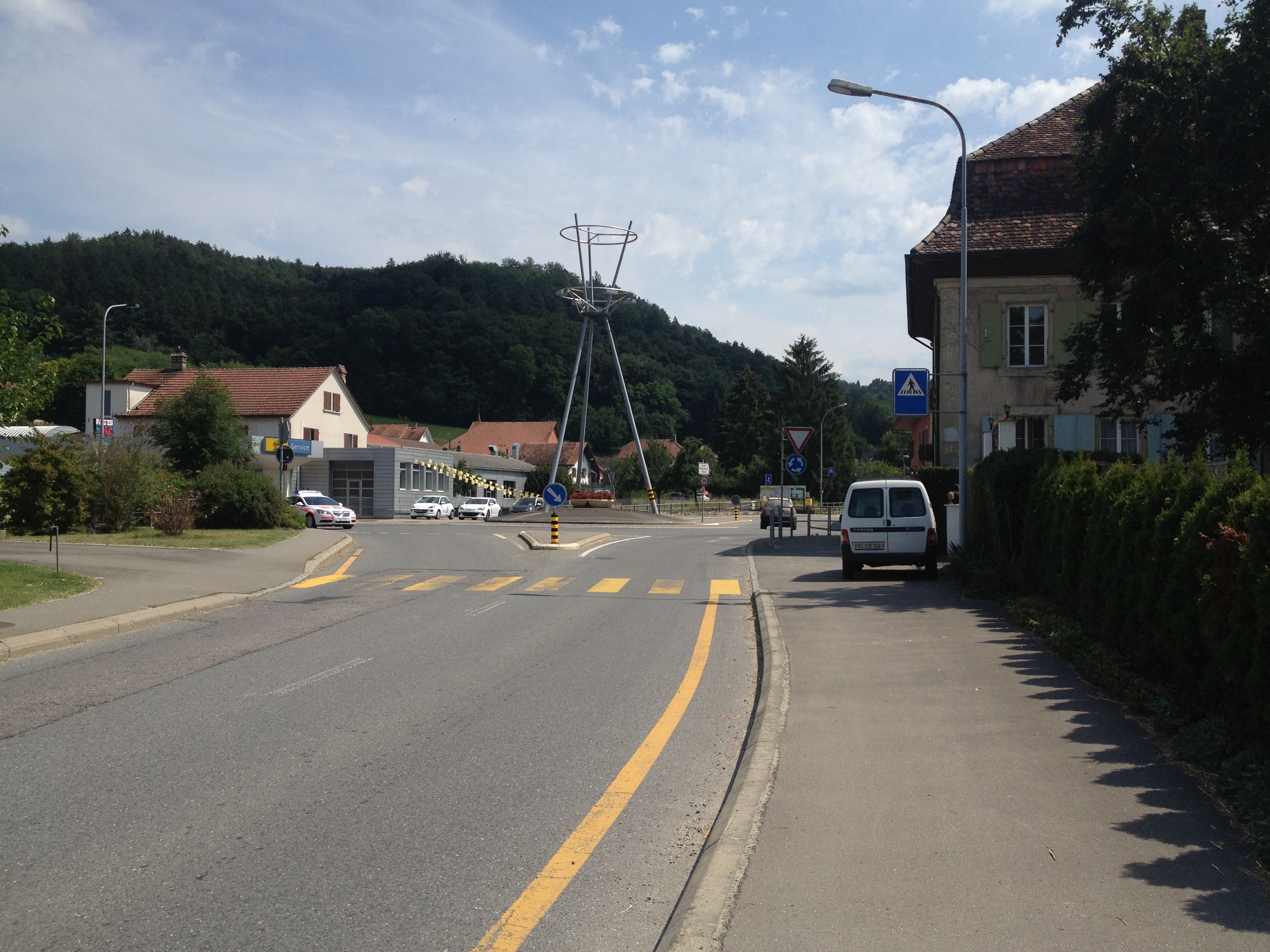

- Flag Coat of arms
- Location of Marnand
- Location within Switzerland Location within Canton of Vaud
- Coordinates: 46°45′N 6°54′E
- Country: Switzerland
- Canton: Vaud
- District: Broye-Vully

Area
  - Total: 2.26 km^{2} (0.87 sq mi)
- Elevation: 477 m (1,565 ft)

Population (2009)
  - Total: 158
  - Density: 69.9/km^{2} (181/sq mi)
- Time zone: UTC+01:00 (CET)
  - Summer (DST): UTC+02:00 (CEST)
- Postal code: 1432
- SFOS number: 5820
- ISO 3166 code: CH-VD
- Surrounded by: Châtonnaye (FR), Granges-près-Marnand, Henniez, Trey, Villarzel
- Website: Profile (in French), SFSO statistics

Marnand is a former municipality in the district of Broye-Vully in the canton of Vaud in Switzerland.

The municipalities of Cerniaz, Combremont-le-Grand, Combremont-le-Petit, Granges-près-Marnand, Marnand, Sassel, Seigneux and Villars-Bramard merged on 1 July 2011 into the new municipality of Valbroye.

== History ==
Marnand is first mentioned in 1142 as Marnant.

== Geography ==
Marnand has an area, as of 2009, of 2.26 square kilometers (0.87 sq mi). Of this area, 1.31 km^{2} (0.51 sq mi) or 58.0% is used for agricultural purposes, while 0.69 km^{2} (0.27 sq mi) or 30.5% is forested. Of the rest of the land, 0.25 km^{2} (0.097 sq mi) or 11.1% is settled (buildings or roads), 0.02 km^{2} (4.9 acres) or 0.9% is either rivers or lakes.

Of the built up area, housing and buildings made up 4.9% and transportation infrastructure made up 4.9%. Out of the forested land, all of the forested land area is covered with heavy forests. Of the agricultural land, 46.5% is used for growing crops and 9.7% is pastures, while 1.8% is used for orchards or vine crops. All the water in the municipality is flowing water.

The municipality was part of the Payerne District until it was dissolved on 31 August 2006, and Marnand became part of the new district of Broye-Vully.

The municipality is located on the right bank of the Broye river at the confluence of the Rioz river into the Broye.

== Coat of arms ==
The blazon of the municipal coat of arms is Per fess: 1. Argent, in base two Snails combatant; 2. Vert.

== Demographics ==
Marnand has a population (as of 2009) of 158. As of 2008, 18.2% of the population are resident foreign nationals. Over the last 10 years (1999–2009 ) the population has changed at a rate of 9%. It has changed at a rate of 4.8% due to migration and at a rate of 2.8% due to births and deaths.

Most of the population (as of 2000) speaks French (134 or 92.4%), with Portuguese being second most common (4 or 2.8%) and German being third (3 or 2.1%). There is 1 person who speaks Italian.

Of the population in the municipality 45 or about 31.0% were born in Marnand and lived there in 2000. There were 46 or 31.7% who were born in the same canton, while 25 or 17.2% were born somewhere else in Switzerland, and 28 or 19.3% were born outside of Switzerland.

In 2008 there were 2 deaths of Swiss citizens. Ignoring immigration and emigration, the population of Swiss citizens decreased by 2 while the foreign population remained the same. There were 2 non-Swiss men and 2 non-Swiss women who immigrated from another country to Switzerland. The total Swiss population change in 2008 (from all sources, including moves across municipal borders) was a decrease of 2 and the non-Swiss population increased by 1 people. This represents a population growth rate of -0.7%.

The age distribution, as of 2009, in Marnand is; 16 children or 10.2% of the population are between 0 and 9 years old and 18 teenagers or 11.5% are between 10 and 19. Of the adult population, 21 people or 13.4% of the population are between 20 and 29 years old. 27 people or 17.2% are between 30 and 39, 33 people or 21.0% are between 40 and 49, and 14 people or 8.9% are between 50 and 59. The senior population distribution is 10 people or 6.4% of the population are between 60 and 69 years old, 10 people or 6.4% are between 70 and 79, there are 7 people or 4.5% who are between 80 and 89, and there is 1 person who is 90 and older.

As of 2000, there were 54 people who were single and never married in the municipality. There were 73 married individuals, 10 widows or widowers and 8 individuals who are divorced.

As of 2000 the average number of residents per living room was 0.57 which is about equal to the cantonal average of 0.61 per room. In this case, a room is defined as space of a housing unit of at least 4 m^{2} (43 sq ft) as normal bedrooms, dining rooms, living rooms, kitchens and habitable cellars and attics. About 38.2% of the total households were owner occupied, or in other words did not pay rent (though they may have a mortgage or a rent-to-own agreement).

As of 2000, there were 57 private households in the municipality, and an average of 2.4 persons per household. There were 12 households that consist of only one person and 3 households with five or more people. Out of a total of 59 households that answered this question, 20.3% were households made up of just one person. Of the rest of the households, there are 21 married couples without children, 19 married couples with children There were 3 single parents with a child or children. There were 2 households that were made up of unrelated people and 2 households that were made up of some sort of institution or another collective housing.

In 2000 there were 16 single family homes (or 34.8% of the total) out of a total of 46 inhabited buildings. There were 11 multi-family buildings (23.9%), along with 14 multi-purpose buildings that were mostly used for housing (30.4%) and 5 other use buildings (commercial or industrial) that also had some housing (10.9%). Of the single family homes 6 were built before 1919, while 1 were built between 1990 and 2000. The greatest number of multi-family homes (4) were built before 1919 and again between 1919 and 1945. There was 1 multi-family house built between 1996 and 2000.

In 2000 there were 71 apartments in the municipality. The most common apartment size was 3 rooms of which there were 20. There were 4 single room apartments and 27 apartments with five or more rooms. Of these apartments, a total of 55 apartments (77.5% of the total) were permanently occupied, while 11 apartments (15.5%) were seasonally occupied and 5 apartments (7.0%) were empty. As of 2009, the construction rate of new housing units was 0 new units per 1000 residents. The vacancy rate for the municipality, in 2010, was 0%.

The historical population is given in the following chart:

== Politics ==
In the 2007 federal election the most popular party was the SVP which received 56.32% of the vote. The next two most popular parties were the FDP (26.32%), the CVP (6.05%). In the federal election, a total of 43 votes were cast, and the voter turnout was 44.8%.

== Economy ==
As of 2010, Marnand had an unemployment rate of 5.5%. As of 2008, there were 32 people employed in the primary economic sector and about 6 businesses involved in this sector. 16 people were employed in the secondary sector and there were 2 businesses in this sector. 20 people were employed in the tertiary sector, with 4 businesses in this sector. There were 65 residents of the municipality who were employed in some capacity, of which females made up 35.4% of the workforce.

In 2008 the total number of full-time equivalent jobs was 52. The number of jobs in the primary sector was 20, all of which were in agriculture. The number of jobs in the secondary sector was 15 of which 4 or (26.7%) were in manufacturing and 11 (73.3%) were in construction. The number of jobs in the tertiary sector was 17. In the tertiary sector; 13 or 76.5% were in the sale or repair of motor vehicles, 3 or 17.6% were in a hotel or restaurant, .

In 2000, there were 35 workers who commuted into the municipality and 41 workers who commuted away. The municipality is a net exporter of workers, with about 1.2 workers leaving the municipality for every one entering. Of the working population, 4.6% used public transportation to get to work, and 53.8% used a private car.

== Religion ==
From the 2000 census, 39 or 26.9% were Roman Catholic, while 82 or 56.6% belonged to the Swiss Reformed Church. Of the rest of the population, there was 1 member of an Orthodox church who belonged, and there were 6 individuals (or about 4.14% of the population) who belonged to another Christian church. There was 1 individual who was Islamic. There were and 2 individuals who belonged to another church. 11 (or about 7.59% of the population) belonged to no church, are agnostic or atheist, and 3 individuals (or about 2.07% of the population) did not answer the question.

== Education ==
In Marnand about 53 or (36.6%) of the population have completed non-mandatory upper secondary education, and 8 or (5.5%) have completed additional higher education (either University or a Fachhochschule). Of the 8 who completed tertiary schooling, 87.5% were Swiss men, 12.5% were Swiss women.

In the 2009/2010 school year there were a total of 21 students in the Marnand school district. In the Vaud cantonal school system, two years of non-obligatory pre-school are provided by the political districts. During the school year, the political district provided pre-school care for a total of 155 children of which 83 children (53.5%) received subsidized pre-school care. The canton's primary school program requires students to attend for four years. There were 13 students in the municipal primary school program. The obligatory lower secondary school program lasts for six years and there were 7 students in those schools. There were also 1 students who were home schooled or attended another non-traditional school.

As of 2000, there were 23 students from Marnand who attended schools outside the municipality.
