= Henniez =

- Municipality
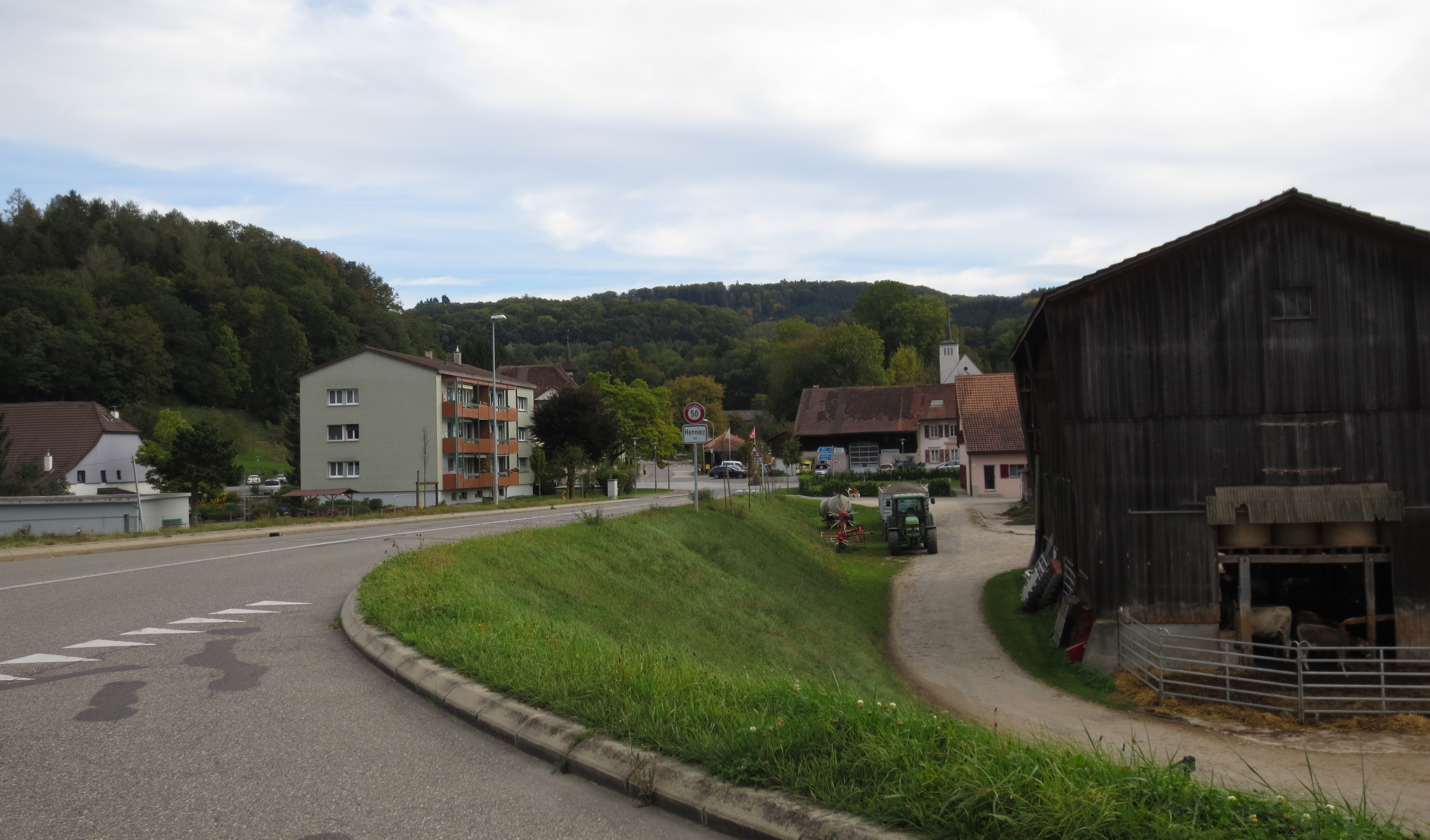

- Flag Coat of arms
- Location of Henniez
- Location within Switzerland Location within Canton of Vaud
- Coordinates: 46°45′N 6°53′E
- Country: Switzerland
- Canton: Vaud
- District: Broye-Vully

Government
  - Mayor: Syndic

Area
  - Total: 2.61 km^{2} (1.01 sq mi)
- Elevation: 484 m (1,588 ft)

Population (2003)
  - Total: 242
  - Density: 92.7/km^{2} (240/sq mi)
- Time zone: UTC+01:00 (CET)
  - Summer (DST): UTC+02:00 (CEST)
- Postal code: 1525
- SFOS number: 5819
- ISO 3166 code: CH-VD
- Surrounded by: Cerniaz, Granges-près-Marnand, Marnand, Seigneux, Villarzel, Villeneuve (FR)
- Website: www.commune-henniez.ch

Henniez is a municipality in the Swiss canton of Vaud, located in the district of Broye-Vully.

== History ==
Henniez is first mentioned in 1380 as Ennyt. In 1668 it was mentioned as Ignie and in 1781 it was called Ingniez.

== Geography ==
Henniez has an area, as of 2009, of 2.61 square kilometers (1.01 sq mi). Of this area, 1.47 km^{2} (0.57 sq mi) or 56.3% is used for agricultural purposes, while 0.63 km^{2} (0.24 sq mi) or 24.1% is forested. Of the rest of the land, 0.4 km^{2} (0.15 sq mi) or 15.3% is settled (buildings or roads), 0.07 km^{2} (17 acres) or 2.7% is either rivers or lakes and 0.03 km^{2} (7.4 acres) or 1.1% is unproductive land.

Of the built up area, industrial buildings made up 3.1% of the total area while housing and buildings made up 5.4% and transportation infrastructure made up 6.5%. Out of the forested land, 23.0% of the total land area is heavily forested and 1.1% is covered with orchards or small clusters of trees. Of the agricultural land, 44.1% is used for growing crops and 11.5% is pastures. All the water in the municipality is flowing water.

The municipality was part of the Payerne District until it was dissolved on 31 August 2006, and Henniez became part of the new district of Broye-Vully.

The municipality is located on the right bank of the Broye river and along the border with the Canton of Fribourg.

== Coat of arms ==
The blazon of the municipal coat of arms is Per pale Argent and Gules, two Tobacco Bundles counterchanged.

== Demographics ==
Henniez has a population (as of December 2020) of 391. As of 2008, 7.2% of the population are resident foreign nationals. Over the last 10 years (1999–2009 ) the population has changed at a rate of -4.5%. It has changed at a rate of -4.1% due to migration and at a rate of -0.8% due to births and deaths.

Most of the population (as of 2000) speaks French (217 or 94.3%), with German being second most common (9 or 3.9%) and Italian being third (2 or 0.9%).

Of the population in the municipality 64 or about 27.8% were born in Henniez and lived there in 2000. There were 81 or 35.2% who were born in the same canton, while 62 or 27.0% were born somewhere else in Switzerland, and 22 or 9.6% were born outside of Switzerland.

In 2008 there were 2 live births to Swiss citizens and 1 birth to non-Swiss citizens, and in same time span there were 2 deaths of Swiss citizens. Ignoring immigration and emigration, the population of Swiss citizens remained the same while the foreign population increased by 1. There was 1 Swiss woman who immigrated back to Switzerland. At the same time, there were 2 non-Swiss men who immigrated from another country to Switzerland. The total Swiss population change in 2008 (from all sources, including moves across municipal borders) was a decrease of 2 and the non-Swiss population increased by 2 people. This represents a population growth rate of 0.0%.

The age distribution, as of 2009, in Henniez is; 29 children or 12.4% of the population are between 0 and 9 years old and 21 teenagers or 9.0% are between 10 and 19. Of the adult population, 19 people or 8.1% of the population are between 20 and 29 years old. 31 people or 13.2% are between 30 and 39, 29 people or 12.4% are between 40 and 49, and 45 people or 19.2% are between 50 and 59. The senior population distribution is 31 people or 13.2% of the population are between 60 and 69 years old, 17 people or 7.3% are between 70 and 79, there are 11 people or 4.7% who are between 80 and 89, and there is 1 person who is 90 and older.

As of 2000, there were 76 people who were single and never married in the municipality. There were 128 married individuals, 14 widows or widowers and 12 individuals who are divorced.

As of 2000, there were 107 private households in the municipality, and an average of 2.1 persons per household. There were 35 households that consist of only one person and 2 households with five or more people. Out of a total of 110 households that answered this question, 31.8% were households made up of just one person. Of the rest of the households, there are 36 married couples without children, 30 married couples with children There were 4 single parents with a child or children. There were 2 households that were made up of unrelated people and 3 households that were made up of some sort of institution or another collective housing.

In 2000 there were 35 single family homes (or 50.7% of the total) out of a total of 69 inhabited buildings. There were 15 multi-family buildings (21.7%), along with 15 multi-purpose buildings that were mostly used for housing (21.7%) and 4 other use buildings (commercial or industrial) that also had some housing (5.8%). Of the single family homes 14 were built before 1919, while 2 were built between 1990 and 2000. The most multi-family homes (4) were built between 1919 and 1945 and the next most (3) were built between 1946 and 1960.

In 2000 there were 113 apartments in the municipality. The most common apartment size was 4 rooms of which there were 41. There were single room apartments and 33 apartments with five or more rooms. Of these apartments, a total of 107 apartments (94.7% of the total) were permanently occupied, while 4 apartments (3.5%) were seasonally occupied and 2 apartments (1.8%) were empty. As of 2009, the construction rate of new housing units was 0 new units per 1000 residents. The vacancy rate for the municipality, in 2010, was 3.42%.

The historical population is given in the following chart:

== Politics ==
In the 2007 federal election the most popular party was the SVP which received 57.47% of the vote. The next three most popular parties were the FDP (13.28%), the Green Party (8.76%) and the SP (8.3%). In the federal election, a total of 68 votes were cast, and the voter turnout was 36.4%.

== Economy ==
As of 2010, Henniez had an unemployment rate of 3%. As of 2008, there were 14 people employed in the primary economic sector and about 5 businesses involved in this sector. 294 people were employed in the secondary sector and there were 5 businesses in this sector. 25 people were employed in the tertiary sector, with 15 businesses in this sector. There were 121 residents of the municipality who were employed in some capacity, of which females made up 38.0% of the workforce.

In 2008 the total number of full-time equivalent jobs was 315. The number of jobs in the primary sector was 10, all of which were in agriculture. The number of jobs in the secondary sector was 286 of which 279 or (97.6%) were in manufacturing and 6 (2.1%) were in construction. The number of jobs in the tertiary sector was 19. In the tertiary sector; 9 or 47.4% were in wholesale or retail sales or the repair of motor vehicles, 3 or 15.8% were in the movement and storage of goods, 1 was in a hotel or restaurant, 1 was a technical professional or scientist, 2 or 10.5% were in education.

In 2000, there were 213 workers who commuted into the municipality and 55 workers who commuted away. The municipality is a net importer of workers, with about 3.9 workers entering the municipality for every one leaving. Of the working population, 3.3% used public transportation to get to work, and 70.2% used a private car.

Henniez is known for its local mineral water. The bottling company was acquired by Nestlé Waters in 2007.

== Religion ==
From the 2000 census, 62 or 27.0% were Roman Catholic, while 144 or 62.6% belonged to the Swiss Reformed Church. Of the rest of the population, there was 1 member of an Orthodox church who belonged. There was 1 individual who was Muslim. 21 (or about 9.13% of the population) belonged to no church, are agnostic or atheist, and 1 individuals (or about 0.43% of the population) did not answer the question.

== Education ==
In Henniez about 75 or (32.6%) of the population have completed non-mandatory upper secondary education, and 11 or (4.8%) have completed additional higher education (either university or a Fachhochschule). Of the 11 who completed tertiary schooling, 63.6% were Swiss men, 18.2% were Swiss women.

In the 2009/2010 school year there were a total of 30 students in the Henniez school district. In the Vaud cantonal school system, two years of non-obligatory pre-school are provided by the political districts. During the school year, the political district provided pre-school care for a total of 155 children of which 83 children (53.5%) received subsidized pre-school care. The canton's primary school program requires students to attend for four years. There were 16 students in the municipal primary school program. The obligatory lower secondary school program lasts for six years and there were 13 students in those schools. There were also 1 students who were home schooled or attended another non-traditional school.

As of 2000, there were 15 students in Henniez who came from another municipality, while 20 residents attended schools outside the municipality.

== Transportation ==
The municipality has a railway station, Henniez, on the Palézieux–Lyss railway line. It has regular service to Lausanne, Palézieux, Payerne, and Kerzers.
