= Trey, Switzerland =

Trey
- Municipality
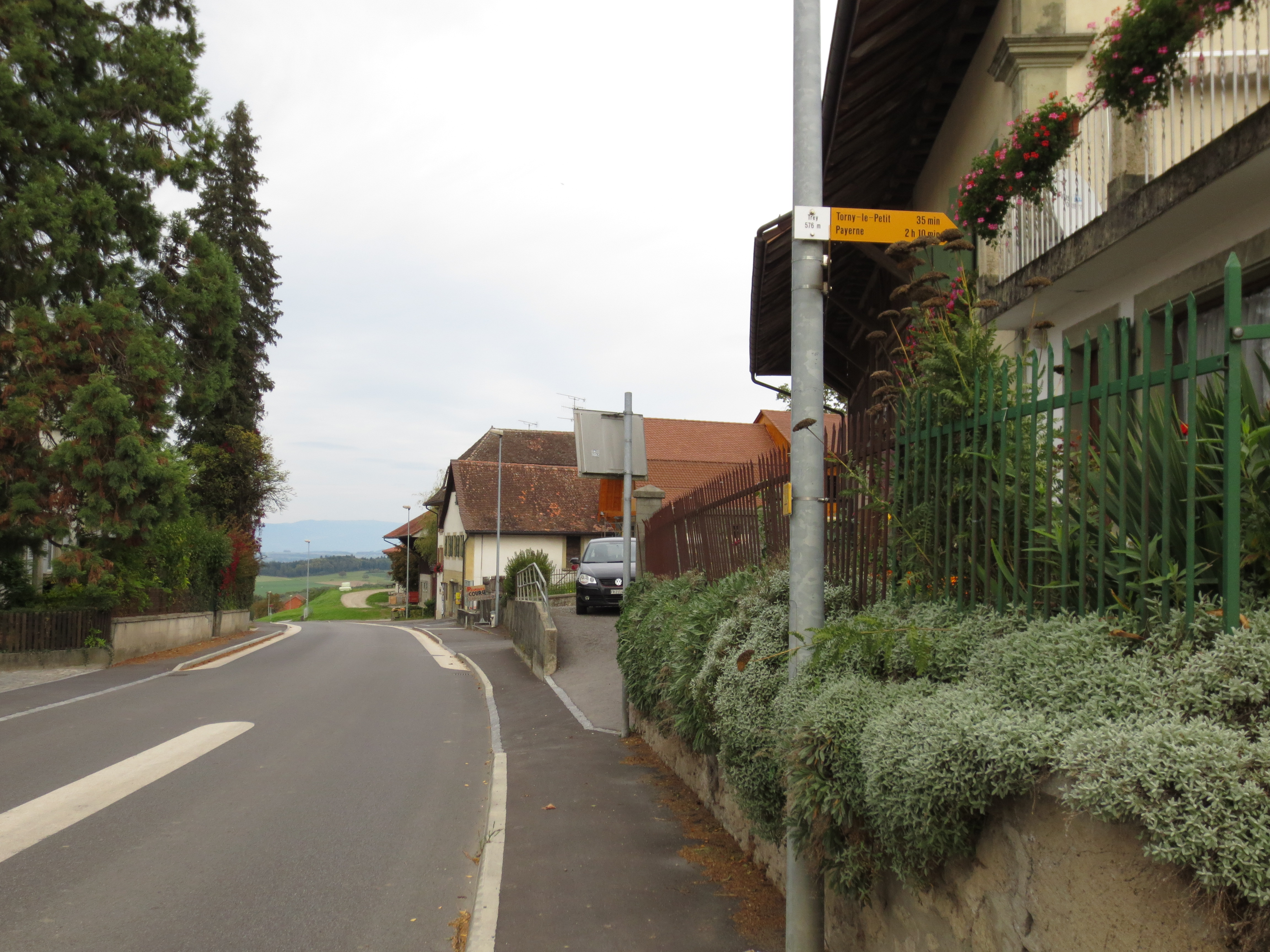

- Flag Coat of arms
- Location of Trey
- Location within Switzerland Location within Canton of Vaud
- Coordinates: 46°46′N 6°55′E
- Country: Switzerland
- Canton: Vaud
- District: Broye-Vully

Government
  - Mayor: Syndic; Jean-Marie Crausaz

Area
  - Total: 3.80 km^{2} (1.47 sq mi)
- Elevation: 574 m (1,883 ft)

Population (2000)
  - Total: 220
  - Density: 58/km^{2} (150/sq mi)
- Time zone: UTC+01:00 (CET)
  - Summer (DST): UTC+02:00 (CEST)
- Postal code: 1552
- SFOS number: 5827
- ISO 3166 code: CH-VD
- Localities: Granges-sous-Trey
- Surrounded by: Châtonnaye (FR), Fétigny-Ménières (FR), Granges-près-Marnand, Marnand, Payerne, Torny (FR)
- Website: trey.ch

Trey is a municipality in the district of Broye-Vully in the canton of Vaud in Switzerland.

== History ==
Trey is first mentioned around 1142–1146 (880 years ago) as Treis.

== Geography ==
Trey has an area, as of 2009, of 3.8 square kilometers (1.5 mi^{2}). Of this area, 2.71 km^{2} (1.05 mi^{2}) or 71.1% is used for agricultural purposes, while 0.67 km^{2} (0.26 mi^{2}) or 17.6% is forested. Of the rest of the land, 0.36 km^{2} (0.14 mi^{2}) or 9.4% is settled (buildings or roads), 0.05 km^{2} (12 acres) or 1.3% is either rivers or lakes.

Of the built up area, housing and buildings made up 3.4% and transportation infrastructure made up 5.5%. Out of the forested land, all of the forested land area is covered with heavy forests. Of the agricultural land, 50.9% is used for growing crops and 16.0% is pastures, while 4.2% is used for orchards or vine crops. All the water in the municipality is flowing water.

The municipality was part of the Payerne District until it was dissolved on 31 August 2006, and Trey became part of the new district of Broye-Vully.

The municipality is located on the border with the Canton of Fribourg. It consists of the village of Trey and the hamlet of Granges-sous-Trey.

== Coat of arms ==
The blazon of the municipal coat of arms is Per pale Argent and Gules, a chevron between three shells two and one counterchanged.

== Demographics ==
Trey has a population (as of December 2020) of 302. As of 2008, 10.9% of the population are resident foreign nationals. Over the last 10 years (1999–2009) the population has changed at a rate of 11.6%. It has changed at a rate of 13.4% due to migration and at a rate of -0.9% due to births and deaths.

Most of the population (as of 2000) speaks French (204 or 87.9%), with German being second most common (24 or 10.3%) and Danish being third (3 or 1.3%).

The age distribution, as of 2009, in Trey is; 35 children or 14.0% of the population are between 0 and 9 years old and 31 teenagers or 12.4% are between 10 and 19. Of the adult population, 28 people or 11.2% of the population are between 20 and 29 years old. 24 people or 9.6% are between 30 and 39, 48 people or 19.2% are between 40 and 49, and 32 people or 12.8% are between 50 and 59. The senior population distribution is 26 people or 10.4% of the population are between 60 and 69 years old, 12 people or 4.8% are between 70 and 79, there are 12 people or 4.8% who are between 80 and 89, and there are 2 people or 0.8% who are 90 and older.

As of 2000, there were 96 people who were single and never married in the municipality. There were 109 married individuals, 20 widows or widowers and 7 individuals who are divorced.

As of 2000, there were 86 private households in the municipality, and an average of 2.5 persons per household. There were 23 households that consist of only one person and 7 households with five or more people. Out of a total of 88 households that answered this question, 26.1% were households made up of just one person and there were 3 adults who lived with their parents. Of the rest of the households, there are 22 married couples without children, 33 married couples with children There was one single parent with a child or children. There were 4 households that were made up of unrelated people and 2 households that were made up of some sort of institution or another collective housing.

In 2000 there were 43 single family homes (or 53.1% of the total) out of a total of 81 inhabited buildings. There were 4 multi-family buildings (4.9%), along with 28 multi-purpose buildings that were mostly used for housing (34.6%) and 6 other use buildings (commercial or industrial) that also had some housing (7.4%).

In 2000, a total of 83 apartments (87.4% of the total) were permanently occupied, while 9 apartments (9.5%) were seasonally occupied and 3 apartments (3.2%) were empty. As of 2009, the construction rate of new housing units was 0 new units per 1000 residents. The vacancy rate for the municipality, in 2010, was 0%.

The historical population is given in the following chart:

== Sights ==
The entire village of Trey is designated as part of the Inventory of Swiss Heritage Sites.

== Politics ==
In the 2007 federal election the most popular party was the FDP which received 34.15% of the vote. The next three most popular parties were the SVP (30.75%), the SP (20.08%) and the Green Party (7.57%). In the federal election, a total of 96 votes were cast, and the voter turnout was 58.5%.

== Economy ==
As of 2010, Trey had an unemployment rate of 2.3%. As of 2008, there were 60 people employed in the primary economic sector and about 13 businesses involved in this sector. 4 people were employed in the secondary sector and there was 1 business in this sector. 10 people were employed in the tertiary sector, with 4 businesses in this sector. There were 102 residents of the municipality who were employed in some capacity, of which females made up 46.1% of the workforce.

In 2008 the total number of full-time equivalent jobs was 59. The number of jobs in the primary sector was 49, all of which were in agriculture. The number of jobs in the secondary sector was 3, all of which were in construction. The number of jobs in the tertiary sector was 7. In the tertiary sector; 1 was in the movement and storage of goods, 2 or 28.6% were in a hotel or restaurant, 1 was a technical professional or scientist, 4 or 57.1% were in education.

In 2000, there were 35 workers who commuted into the municipality and 57 workers who commuted away. The municipality is a net exporter of workers, with about 1.6 workers leaving the municipality for every one entering. Of the working population, 6.9% used public transportation to get to work, and 54.9% used a private car.

== Religion ==
From the 2000 census, 32 or 13.8% were Roman Catholic, while 175 or 75.4% belonged to the Swiss Reformed Church. Of the rest of the population, there were 5 individuals (or about 2.16% of the population) who belonged to another Christian church. 19 (or about 8.19% of the population) belonged to no church, are agnostic or atheist, and 3 individuals (or about 1.29% of the population) did not answer the question.

== Education ==
In Trey about 75 or (32.3%) of the population have completed non-mandatory upper secondary education, and 22 or (9.5%) have completed additional higher education (either university or a Fachhochschule). Of the 22 who completed tertiary schooling, 50.0% were Swiss men, 27.3% were Swiss women.

In the 2009/2010 school year there were a total of 33 students in the Trey school district. In the Vaud cantonal school system, two years of non-obligatory pre-school are provided by the political districts. During the school year, the political district provided pre-school care for a total of 155 children of which 83 children (53.5%) received subsidized pre-school care. The canton's primary school program requires students to attend for four years. There were 21 students in the municipal primary school program. The obligatory lower secondary school program lasts for six years and there were 12 students in those schools.

As of 2000, there was one student in Trey who came from another municipality, while 43 residents attended schools outside the municipality.
