= Granges-près-Marnand train crash =

2013 public transit disaster in Granges-près-Marnand, Switzerland

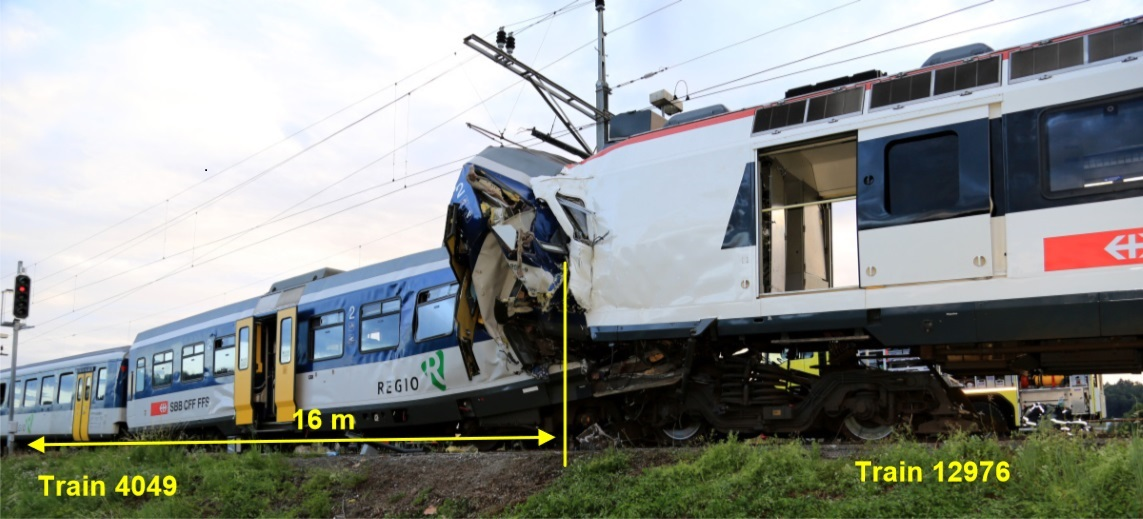

Details
- Date: 29 July 2013; 18:50 CEST (16:50 UTC)
- Location: Granges-près-Marnand
- Coordinates: 46°46′25″N 6°53′35″E
- Country: Switzerland
- Line: Palézieux–Payerne
- Operator: Swiss Federal Railways
- Incident type: Head-on collision
- Cause: Driver error - SPAD

Statistics
- Trains: 2
- Passengers: 40+
- Deaths: 1
- Injured: 25

On 29 July 2013, two passenger trains were involved in a head-on collision at Granges-près-Marnand, Switzerland, killing one person and injuring 25 others.

== Accident ==
At 18:50 CEST (16:50 UTC), two passenger trains were involved in a head-on collision at Granges-près-Marnand, Vaud, Switzerland, on the Palézieux–Payerne line. Initially, it was reported that up to 44 people were injured, five seriously. This was later revised to 25 injured. The 24-year-old driver of the train heading to Granges-près-Marnand was killed in the crash: His body was recovered in the early hours of 30 July. The injured were taken to hospitals in Lausanne and Payerne. All but three of the injured had been discharged from hospital by 30 July. Both of the trains were operated by Swiss Federal Railways.

== Disruption ==
As a result of the accident, train services were suspended between Moudon and Payerne. A bus replacement service was provided. The line was scheduled to be reopened in the afternoon of 30 July.

== Investigation ==
At the time, the Swiss Accident Investigation Board (SAIB) were responsible for investigating railway accidents in Switzerland. The wrecked trains were moved to Yverdon where they were examined by the investigators.

== Cause ==
Initial reports indicated that the local train at Grange-près-Marnand station did not wait for the arrival of the incoming train from Payerne and left the station too soon. The SAIB final report shows that the accident was caused by train 12976 departing from Granges-près-Marnard against a red signal.

== See also ==
- List of rail accidents (2010–2019)
