= Cerniaz =

- Former municipality
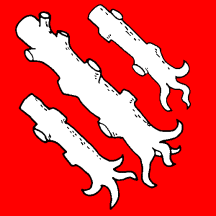
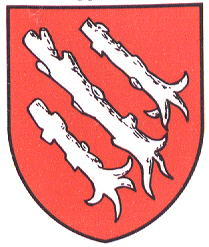
- Flag Coat of arms
- Location of Cerniaz
- Location within Switzerland Location within Canton of Vaud
- Coordinates: 46°44′N 6°54′E
- Country: Switzerland
- Canton: Vaud
- District: Broye-Vully

Area
  - Total: 1.8 km^{2} (0.69 sq mi)
- Elevation: 687 m (2,254 ft)

Population (2009)
  - Total: 42
  - Density: 23/km^{2} (60/sq mi)
- Time zone: UTC+01:00 (CET)
  - Summer (DST): UTC+02:00 (CEST)
- Postal code: 1682
- SFOS number: 5811
- ISO 3166 code: CH-VD
- Surrounded by: Henniez, Seigneux, Villars-Bramard, Villarzel
- Website: Profile (in French), SFSO statistics

Cerniaz is a former municipality in the district of Broye-Vully in the canton of Vaud in Switzerland.

The municipalities of Cerniaz, Combremont-le-Grand, Combremont-le-Petit, Granges-près-Marnand, Marnand, Sassel, Seigneux and Villars-Bramard merged on 1 July 2011 into the new municipality of Valbroye.

== History ==
Cerniaz is first mentioned in 1444 as Sernia.

== Geography ==
Cerniaz has an area, as of 2009, of 1.8 square kilometers (0.69 sq mi). Of this area, 1.38 km^{2} (0.53 sq mi) or 76.7% is used for agricultural purposes, while 0.38 km^{2} (0.15 sq mi) or 21.1% is forested. Of the rest of the land, 0.07 km^{2} (17 acres) or 3.9% is settled (buildings or roads).

Of the built up area, housing and buildings made up 2.2% and transportation infrastructure made up 1.7%. Out of the forested land, 19.4% of the total land area is heavily forested and 1.7% is covered with orchards or small clusters of trees. Of the agricultural land, 63.3% is used for growing crops and 11.7% is pastures, while 1.7% is used for orchards or vine crops.

The municipality was part of the Payerne District until it was dissolved on 31 August 2006, and Cerniaz became part of the new district of Broye-Vully.

The former municipality is located on a plateau above the Broye valley and near the border with the Canton of Fribourg. It consists of the village of Cerniaz and the hamlet of La Morettaz.

== Coat of arms ==
The blazon of the municipal coat of arms is Gules, three trunks bendwise eradicated Argent.

== Demographics ==
Cerniaz has a population (as of 2009) of 42, all Swiss citizens. Over the last 10 years (1999–2009 ) the population has changed at a rate of -36.4%. It has changed at a rate of -30.3% due to migration and at a rate of -6.1% due to births and deaths.

Most of the population (as of 2000) speaks French (62 or 98.4%) with the rest speaking German.

Of the population in the municipality 28 or about 44.4% were born in Cerniaz and lived there in 2000. There were 20 or 31.7% who were born in the same canton, while 14 or 22.2% were born somewhere else in Switzerland, and 1 or 1.6% were born outside of Switzerland.

In 2008 there was 1 live birth to Swiss citizens. Ignoring immigration and emigration, the population of Swiss citizens increased by 1 while the foreign population remained the same. The total Swiss population change in 2008 (from all sources, including moves across municipal borders) was a decrease of 8 and the non-Swiss population remained the same. This represents a population growth rate of -14.8%.

The age distribution, as of 2009, in Cerniaz is; 3 children or 7.1% of the population are between 0 and 9 years old and 5 teenagers or 11.9% are between 10 and 19. Of the adult population, 3 people or 7.1% of the population are between 20 and 29 years old. 6 people or 14.3% are between 30 and 39, 5 people or 11.9% are between 40 and 49, and 4 people or 9.5% are between 50 and 59. The senior population distribution is 7 people or 16.7% of the population are between 60 and 69 years old, 8 people or 19.0% are between 70 and 79, there is 1 person who is between 80 and 89.

As of 2000, there were 25 people who were single and never married in the municipality. There were 26 married individuals, 7 widows or widowers and 5 individuals who are divorced.

As of 2000 the average number of residents per living room was 0.52 which is fewer people per room than the cantonal average of 0.61 per room. In this case, a room is defined as space of a housing unit of at least 4 m^{2} (43 sq ft) as normal bedrooms, dining rooms, living rooms, kitchens and habitable cellars and attics. About 60% of the total households were owner occupied, or in other words did not pay rent (though they may have a mortgage or a rent-to-own agreement).

As of 2000, there were 27 private households in the municipality, and an average of 2.3 persons per household. There were 7 households that consist of only one person and 2 households with five or more people. Out of a total of 27 households that answered this question, 25.9% were households made up of just one person. Of the rest of the households, there are 10 married couples without children, 8 married couples with children. There were 2 households that were made up of unrelated people.

In 2000 there were 12 single family homes (or 50.0% of the total) out of a total of 24 inhabited buildings. There was 1 multi-family building (4.2%) and 11 multi-purpose buildings that were mostly used for housing (45.8%). Of the single family homes 8 were built before 1919, while none were built between 1990 and 2000. The multi-family home was built between 1981 and 1990.

In 2000 there were 26 apartments in the municipality. The most common apartment size was 5 rooms of which there were 9. There were 1 single room apartments and 15 apartments with five or more rooms. Of these apartments, a total of 25 apartments (96.2% of the total) were permanently occupied, while 1 apartment (3.8%) was seasonally occupied. As of 2009, the construction rate of new housing units was 0 new units per 1000 residents. The vacancy rate for the municipality, in 2010, was 0%.

The historical population is given in the following chart:

== Politics ==
In the 2007 federal election the most popular party was the SVP which received 42.74% of the vote. The next three most popular parties were the FDP (26.5%), the Green Party (11.54%) and the EDU Party (7.69%). In the federal election, a total of 13 votes were cast, and the voter turnout was 31.0%.

== Economy ==
As of 2010, Cerniaz had an unemployment rate of 0%. As of 2008, there were 8 people employed in the primary economic sector and about 5 businesses involved in this sector. No one was employed in the secondary sector or tertiary sector. There were 22 residents of the municipality who were employed in some capacity, of which females made up 22.7% of the workforce. In 2008 the total number of full-time equivalent jobs was 5, all of which were in agriculture.

In 2000, there were 14 workers who commuted away from the municipality. Of the working population, 4.5% used public transportation to get to work, and 59.1% used a private car.

== Religion ==
From the 2000 census, 13 or 20.6% were Roman Catholic, while 40 or 63.5% belonged to the Swiss Reformed Church. Of the rest of the population, there was 1 individual who belongs to another Christian church. 9 (or about 14.29% of the population) belonged to no church, are agnostic or atheist.

== Education ==
In Cerniaz about 19 or (30.2%) of the population have completed non-mandatory upper secondary education, and 4 or (6.3%) have completed additional higher education (either University or a Fachhochschule). Of the 4 who completed tertiary schooling, 75.0% were Swiss men, 25.0% were Swiss women.

In the 2009/2010 school year there were a total of 3 students in the Cerniaz (VD) school district. In the Vaud cantonal school system, two years of non-obligatory pre-school are provided by the political districts. During the school year, the political district provided pre-school care for a total of 155 children of which 83 children (53.5%) received subsidized pre-school care. The canton's primary school program requires students to attend for four years. There was 1 student in the municipal primary school program. The obligatory lower secondary school program lasts for six years and there were 2 students in those schools.

As of 2000, there were 8 students from Cerniaz who attended schools outside the municipality.
