= Dompierre, Vaud =

Dompierre
- Municipality
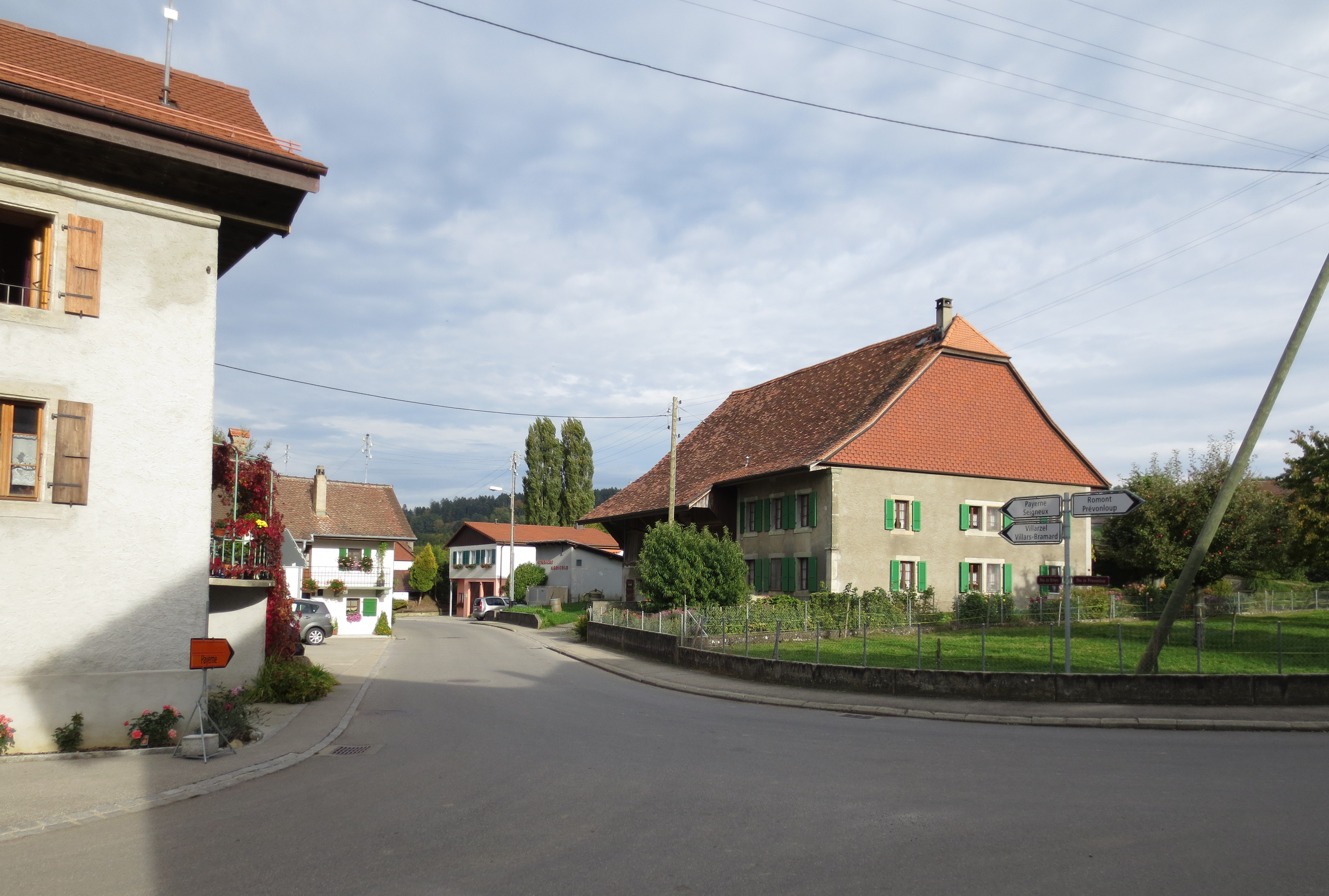

- Flag Coat of arms
- Location of Dompierre
- Location within Switzerland Location within Canton of Vaud
- Coordinates: 46°43′N 6°53′E
- Country: Switzerland
- Canton: Vaud
- District: Broye-Vully

Government
  - Mayor: Syndic

Area
  - Total: 3.21 km^{2} (1.24 sq mi)
- Elevation: 713 m (2,339 ft)

Population (2003)
  - Total: 250
  - Density: 78/km^{2} (200/sq mi)
- Time zone: UTC+01:00 (CET)
  - Summer (DST): UTC+02:00 (CEST)
- Postal code: 1682
- SFOS number: 5671
- ISO 3166 code: CH-VD
- Surrounded by: Curtilles, Lovatens, Prévonloup, Romont (FR), Seigneux, Villars-Bramard
- Website: http://www.dompierre-vd.ch Profile (in French), SFSO statistics

Dompierre is a municipality in the district of Broye-Vully, canton of Vaud, Switzerland.

== History ==
Dompierre is first mentioned in 1228 as Donperro.

== Geography ==
Dompierre has an area, as of 2009, of 3.21 square kilometers (1.24 sq mi). Of this area, 2.35 km^{2} (0.91 sq mi) or 73.2% is used for agricultural purposes, while 0.69 km^{2} (0.27 sq mi) or 21.5% is forested. Of the rest of the land, 0.18 km^{2} (0.069 sq mi) or 5.6% is settled (buildings or roads).

Of the built up area, housing and buildings made up 3.4% and transportation infrastructure made up 1.2%. Out of the forested land, all of the forested land area is covered with heavy forests. Of the agricultural land, 57.6% is used for growing crops and 11.5% is pastures, while 4.0% is used for orchards or vine crops.

The municipality was part of the Moudon District until it was dissolved on 31 August 2006, and Dompierre became part of the new district of Broye-Vully.

The municipality is located on a plateau above the Broye valley on the border with the Canton of Fribourg. It consists of the village of Dompierre and the hamlet of Granges.

== Coat of arms ==
The blazon of the municipal coat of arms is Or, a Lion rampant Sable langued Gules and armed of the first.

== Demographics ==
Dompierre has a population (as of December 2020) of 245. As of 2008, 5.0% of the population are resident foreign nationals. Over the last 10 years (1999–2009) the population has changed at a rate of -0.8%. It has changed at a rate of 2% due to migration and at a rate of -2.4% due to births and deaths.

Most of the population (as of 2000) speaks French (230 or 93.5%), with German being second most common (11 or 4.5%) and Spanish being third (3 or 1.2%). There is 1 person who speaks Italian.

Of the population in the municipality 102 or about 41.5% were born in Dompierre and lived there in 2000. There were 81 or 32.9% who were born in the same canton, while 47 or 19.1% were born somewhere else in Switzerland, and 14 or 5.7% were born outside of Switzerland.

In 2008 there were 2 live births to Swiss citizens and there were 4 deaths of Swiss citizens. Ignoring immigration and emigration, the population of Swiss citizens decreased by 2 while the foreign population remained the same. There was 1 Swiss woman who immigrated back to Switzerland. The total Swiss population change in 2008 (from all sources, including moves across municipal borders) was a decrease of 3 and the non-Swiss population decreased by 4 people. This represents a population growth rate of -2.8%.

The age distribution, as of 2009, in Dompierre is; 21 children or 8.3% of the population are between 0 and 9 years old and 38 teenagers or 15.0% are between 10 and 19. Of the adult population, 23 people or 9.1% of the population are between 20 and 29 years old. 31 people or 12.3% are between 30 and 39, 41 people or 16.2% are between 40 and 49, and 37 people or 14.6% are between 50 and 59. The senior population distribution is 24 people or 9.5% of the population are between 60 and 69 years old, 19 people or 7.5% are between 70 and 79, there are 16 people or 6.3% who are between 80 and 89, and there are 3 people or 1.2% who are 90 and older.

As of 2000, there were 105 people who were single and never married in the municipality. There were 120 married individuals, 10 widows or widowers and 11 individuals who are divorced.

As of 2000, there were 91 private households in the municipality, and an average of 2.7 persons per household. There were 24 households that consist of only one person and 12 households with five or more people. Out of a total of 92 households that answered this question, 26.1% were households made up of just one person and there was 1 adult who lived with their parents. Of the rest of the households, there are 25 married couples without children, 35 married couples with children. There were 4 single parents with a child or children. There were 2 households that were made up of unrelated people and 1 household that was made up of some sort of institution or another collective housing.

In 2000 there were 40 single family homes (or 51.3% of the total) out of a total of 78 inhabited buildings. There were 8 multi-family buildings (10.3%), along with 29 multi-purpose buildings that were mostly used for housing (37.2%) and 1 other use buildings (commercial or industrial) that also had some housing (1.3%). Of the single family homes 22 were built before 1919, while 2 were built between 1990 and 2000. The greatest number of multi-family homes (3) were built before 1919 and again between 1946 and 1960.

In 2000 there were 99 apartments in the municipality. The most common apartment size was 4 rooms of which there were 33. There were 1 single room apartments and 46 apartments with five or more rooms. Of these apartments, a total of 90 apartments (90.9% of the total) were permanently occupied, while 6 apartments (6.1%) were seasonally occupied and 3 apartments (3.0%) were empty. As of 2009, the construction rate of new housing units was 0 new units per 1000 residents. The vacancy rate for the municipality, in 2010, was 0%.

The historical population is given in the following chart:

== Politics ==
In the 2007 federal election the most popular party was the SVP which received 41.12% of the vote. The next three most popular parties were the FDP (18.72%), the SP (11.51%) and the Green Party (6.52%). In the federal election, a total of 85 votes were cast, and the voter turnout was 47.2%.

== Economy ==
As of 2010, Dompierre had an unemployment rate of 2.1%. As of 2008, there were 36 people employed in the primary economic sector and about 14 businesses involved in this sector. 12 people were employed in the secondary sector and there were 2 businesses in this sector. 7 people were employed in the tertiary sector, with 4 businesses in this sector. There were 108 residents of the municipality who were employed in some capacity, of which females made up 39.8% of the workforce.

In 2008 the total number of full-time equivalent jobs was 36. The number of jobs in the primary sector was 19, all of which were in agriculture. The number of jobs in the secondary sector was 11, all of which were in construction. The number of jobs in the tertiary sector was 6. In the tertiary sector; 5 or 83.3% were in wholesale or retail sales or the repair of motor vehicles, 1 was a technical professional or scientist, .

In 2000, there were 7 workers who commuted into the municipality and 62 workers who commuted away. The municipality is a net exporter of workers, with about 8.9 workers leaving the municipality for every one entering. Of the working population, 3.7% used public transportation to get to work, and 56.5% used a private car.

== Religion ==
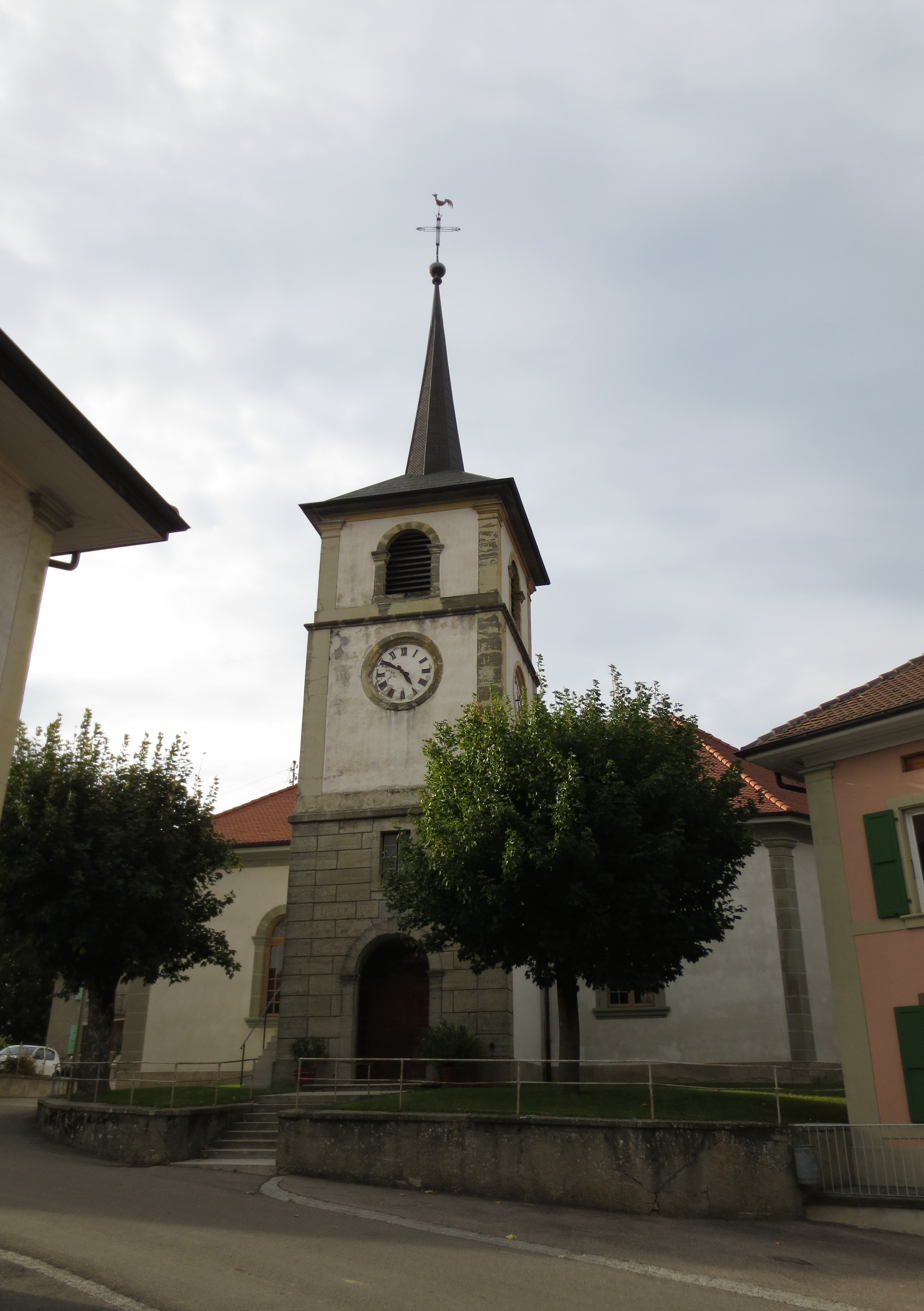

From the 2000 census, 39 or 15.9% were Roman Catholic, while 173 or 70.3% belonged to the Swiss Reformed Church. Of the rest of the population, there were 4 members of an Orthodox church (or about 1.63% of the population), and there were 11 individuals (or about 4.47% of the population) who belonged to another Christian church. 18 (or about 7.32% of the population) belonged to no church, are agnostic or atheist, and 1 individuals (or about 0.41% of the population) did not answer the question.

== Education ==
In Dompierre about 85 or (34.6%) of the population have completed non-mandatory upper secondary education, and 24 or (9.8%) have completed additional higher education (either university or a Fachhochschule). Of the 24 who completed tertiary schooling, 62.5% were Swiss men, 25.0% were Swiss women.

In the 2009/2010 school year there were a total of 34 students in the Dompierre (VD) school district. In the Vaud cantonal school system, two years of non-obligatory pre-school are provided by the political districts. During the school year, the political district provided pre-school care for a total of 155 children of which 83 children (53.5%) received subsidized pre-school care. The canton's primary school program requires students to attend for four years. There were 14 students in the municipal primary school program. The obligatory lower secondary school program lasts for six years and there were 19 students in those schools. There were also 1 students who were home schooled or attended another non-traditional school.

As of 2000, there were 12 students in Dompierre who came from another municipality, while 35 residents attended schools outside the municipality.
