= Sassel =

- Former municipality
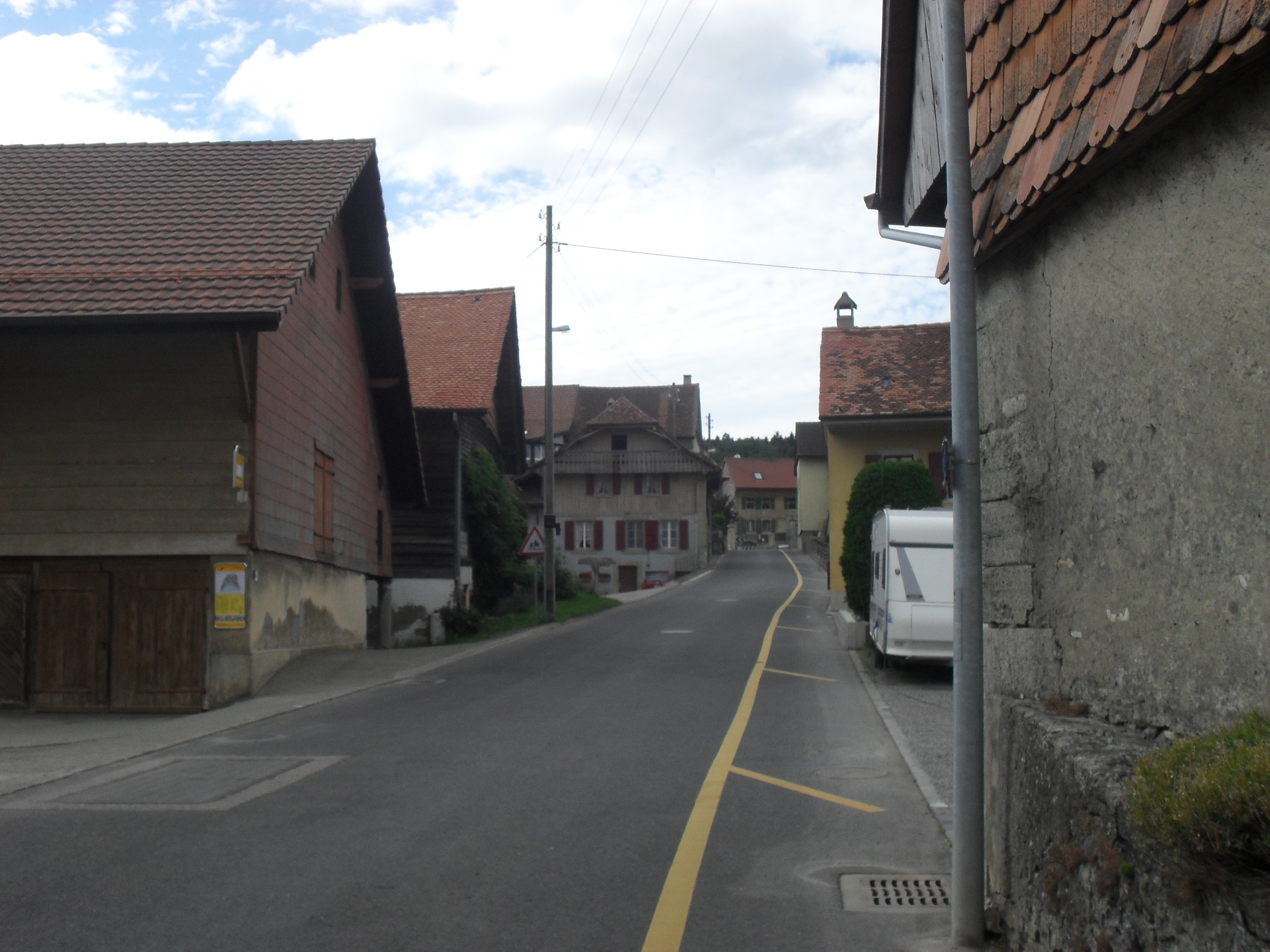

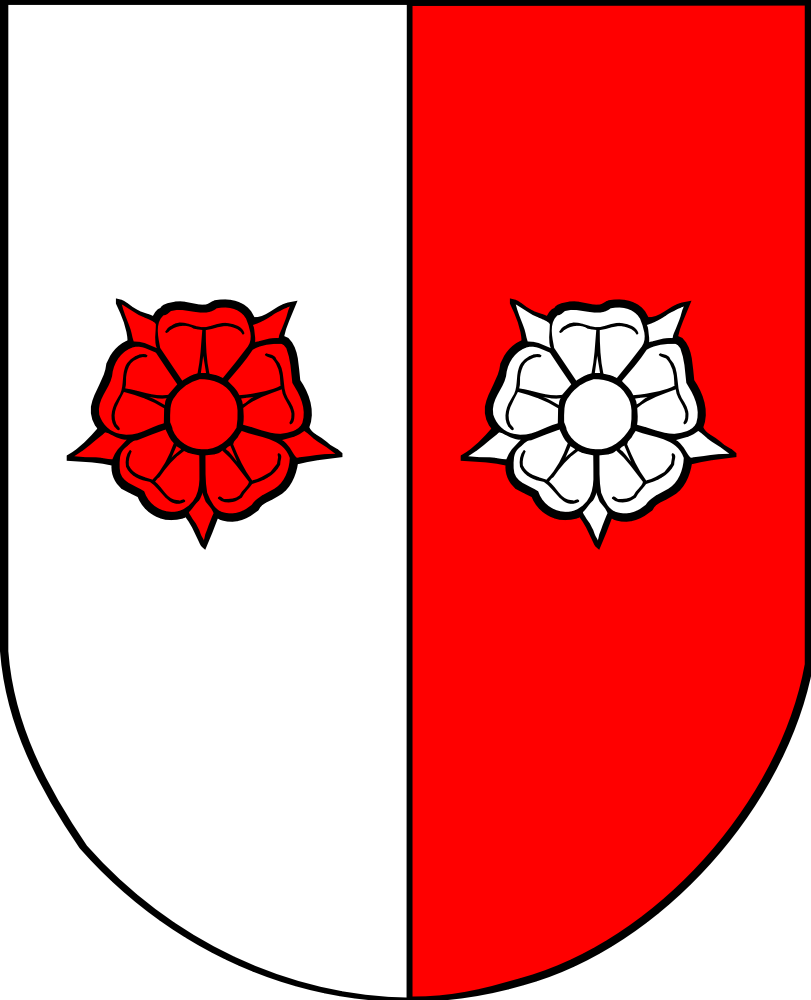
- Flag Coat of arms
- Location of Sassel
- Location within Switzerland Location within Canton of Vaud
- Coordinates: 46°47′N 6°51′E
- Country: Switzerland
- Canton: Vaud
- District: Broye-Vully

Area
  - Total: 3.35 km^{2} (1.29 sq mi)
- Elevation: 634 m (2,080 ft)

Population (2009)
  - Total: 154
  - Density: 46.0/km^{2} (119/sq mi)
- Time zone: UTC+01:00 (CET)
  - Summer (DST): UTC+02:00 (CEST)
- Postal code: 1534
- SFOS number: 5824
- ISO 3166 code: CH-VD
- Surrounded by: Cheiry (FR), Combremont-le-Grand, Granges-près-Marnand, Les Montets (FR), Fétigny-Ménières (FR), Nuvilly (FR)
- Website: Profile (in French), SFSO statistics

Sassel is a former municipality in the district of Broye-Vully in the canton of Vaud in Switzerland.

The villages of Cerniaz (VD), Combremont-le-Grand, Combremont-le-Petit, Granges-près-Marnand, Marnand, Sassel, Seigneux and Villars-Bramard merged on 1 July 2011 into the new municipality of Valbroye.

== History ==
Sassel is first mentioned in 1177 as Sases.

== Geography ==
Sassel has an area, as of 2009, of 3.3 square kilometers (1.3 mi^{2}). Of this area, 2.19 km^{2} (0.85 mi^{2}) or 67.2% is used for agricultural purposes, while 0.91 km^{2} (0.35 mi^{2}) or 27.9% is forested. Of the rest of the land, 0.15 km^{2} (37 acres) or 4.6% is settled (buildings or roads).

Of the built up area, housing and buildings made up 2.1% and transportation infrastructure made up 2.1%. Out of the forested land, all of the forested land area is covered with heavy forests. Of the agricultural land, 50.9% is used for growing crops and 15.3% is pastures.

The municipality was part of the Payerne District until it was dissolved on 31 August 2006, and Sassel became part of the new district of Broye-Vully.

The village is located on the north-east portion of the Jorat region on the left bank of the Broye river. It consists of the haufendorf village (an irregular, unplanned and quite closely packed village, built around a central square) of Sassel.

== Coat of arms ==
The blazon of the municipal coat of arms is Per pale Argent and Gules, two Roses counterchanged.

== Demographics ==
Sassel has a population (As of December 2009) of 154. As of 2008, 4.6% of the population are resident foreign nationals. Over the last 10 years (1999-2009 ) the population has changed at a rate of 5.5%. It has changed at a rate of 10.3% due to migration and at a rate of -5.5% due to births and deaths.

Most of the population (as of 2000) speaks French (139 or 93.9%), with German being second most common (7 or 4.7%) and Italian being third (2 or 1.4%).

Of the population in the village 62 or about 41.9% were born in Sassel and lived there in 2000. There were 35 or 23.6% who were born in the same canton, while 35 or 23.6% were born somewhere else in Switzerland, and 11 or 7.4% were born outside of Switzerland.

In 2008 there were 2 live births to Swiss citizens and were 2 deaths of Swiss citizens. Ignoring immigration and emigration, the population of Swiss citizens remained the same while the foreign population remained the same. The total Swiss population change in 2008 (from all sources, including moves across municipal borders) was a decrease of 2 and the non-Swiss population remained the same. This represents a population growth rate of -1.3%.

The age distribution, as of 2009, in Sassel is; 22 children or 14.3% of the population are between 0 and 9 years old and 15 teenagers or 9.7% are between 10 and 19. Of the adult population, 8 people or 5.2% of the population are between 20 and 29 years old. 27 people or 17.5% are between 30 and 39, 22 people or 14.3% are between 40 and 49, and 20 people or 13.0% are between 50 and 59. The senior population distribution is 28 people or 18.2% of the population are between 60 and 69 years old, 8 people or 5.2% are between 70 and 79, there are 4 people or 2.6% who are between 80 and 89.

As of 2000, there were 58 people who were single and never married in the village. There were 68 married individuals, 11 widows or widowers and 11 individuals who are divorced.

As of 2000 the average number of residents per living room was 0.48 which is fewer people per room than the cantonal average of 0.61 per room. In this case, a room is defined as space of a housing unit of at least 4 m² (43 sq ft) as normal bedrooms, dining rooms, living rooms, kitchens and habitable cellars and attics. About 81.4% of the total households were owner occupied, or in other words did not pay rent (though they may have a mortgage or a rent-to-own agreement).

As of 2000, there were 57 private households in the village, and an average of 2.4 persons per household. There were 16 households that consist of only one person and 3 households with five or more people. Out of a total of 58 households that answered this question, 27.6% were households made up of just one person. Of the rest of the households, there are 18 married couples without children, 22 married couples with children There was one single parent with a child or children.

In 2000 there were 23 single family homes (or 52.3% of the total) out of a total of 44 inhabited buildings. There were 5 multi-family buildings (11.4%), along with 14 multi-purpose buildings that were mostly used for housing (31.8%) and 2 other use buildings (commercial or industrial) that also had some housing (4.5%). Of the single family homes 16 were built before 1919, while 1 was built between 1990 and 2000. The most multi-family homes (2) were built before 1919 and the next most (1) were built between 1919 and 1945.

In 2000 there were 54 apartments in the village. The most common apartment size was 4 rooms of which there were 21. There were single room apartments and 26 apartments with five or more rooms. Of these apartments, a total of 43 apartments (79.6% of the total) were permanently occupied, while 10 apartments (18.5%) were seasonally occupied and one apartment was empty. As of 2009, the construction rate of new housing units was 0 new units per 1000 residents. The vacancy rate for the village, in 2010, was 0%.

The historical population is given in the following chart:

== Sights ==
The entire village of Sassel is designated as part of the Inventory of Swiss Heritage Sites.

== Politics ==
In the 2007 federal election the most popular party was the SVP which received 43.25% of the vote. The next three most popular parties were the FDP (25.1%), the Green Party (12.9%) and the SP (10.28%). In the federal election, a total of 59 votes were cast, and the voter turnout was 50.0%.

== Economy ==
As of 2010, Sassel had an unemployment rate of 0.8%. As of 2008, there were 36 people employed in the primary economic sector and about 7 businesses involved in this sector. 2 people were employed in the secondary sector and there was 1 business in this sector. 9 people were employed in the tertiary sector, with 3 businesses in this sector. There were 80 residents of the village who were employed in some capacity, of which females made up 45.0% of the workforce.

In 2008 the total number of full-time equivalent jobs was 29. The number of jobs in the primary sector was 20, all of which were in agriculture. The number of jobs in the secondary sector was 2, all of which were in construction. The number of jobs in the tertiary sector was 7. In the tertiary sector; 2 or 28.6% were in a hotel or restaurant, 1 was in education and 5 or 71.4% were in health care.

In 2000, there were 9 workers who commuted into the village and 40 workers who commuted away. The village is a net exporter of workers, with about 4.4 workers leaving the village for every one entering. Of the working population, 5% used public transportation to get to work, and 67.5% used a private car.

== Religion ==
From the 2000 census, 26 or 17.6% were Roman Catholic, while 107 or 72.3% belonged to the Swiss Reformed Church. Of the rest of the population, there were 8 individuals (or about 5.41% of the population) who belonged to another Christian church. There was 1 person who was Buddhist. 9 (or about 6.08% of the population) belonged to no church, are agnostic or atheist, and 1 individuals (or about 0.68% of the population) did not answer the question.

== Education ==
In Sassel about 57 or (38.5%) of the population have completed non-mandatory upper secondary education, and 14 or (9.5%) have completed additional higher education (either University or a Fachhochschule). Of the 14 who completed tertiary schooling, 64.3% were Swiss men, 28.6% were Swiss women.

In the 2009/2010 school year there were a total of 21 students in the Sassel school district. In the Vaud cantonal school system, two years of non-obligatory pre-school are provided by the political districts. During the school year, the political district provided pre-school care for a total of 155 children of which 83 children (53.5%) received subsidized pre-school care. The canton's primary school program requires students to attend for four years. There were 15 students in the municipal primary school program. The obligatory lower secondary school program lasts for six years and there were 6 students in those schools.

As of 2000, there were 10 students in Sassel who came from another village, while 6 residents attended schools outside the village.
