= Broye-Vully District =

Coordinates: 46°49′N 6°56′E

Broye-Vully District District de la Broye-Vully
- District
- Country: Switzerland
- Canton: Vaud
- Capital: Payerne

Area
  - Total: 264.98 km^{2} (102.31 sq mi)

Population (2020)
  - Total: 44,552
  - Density: 168.13/km^{2} (435.46/sq mi)
- Time zone: UTC+1 (CET)
  - Summer (DST): UTC+2 (CEST)
- Municipalities: 31

Broye-Vully District (French: District de la Broye-Vully) is a district in Vaud Canton in Switzerland.

== Geography ==
Broye-Vully has an area, as of 2009, of 264.99 square kilometers (102.31 sq mi). Of this area, 173.61 km^{2} (67.03 sq mi) or 65.5% is used for agricultural purposes, while 56.85 km^{2} (21.95 sq mi) or 21.5% is forested. Of the rest of the land, 29.29 km^{2} (11.31 sq mi) or 11.1% is settled (buildings or roads) and 5.19 km^{2} (2.00 sq mi) or 2.0% is unproductive land.

== Demographics ==
Broye-Vully has a population (as of December 2020) of 44,552.

In 2008 there were 280 live births to Swiss citizens and 116 births to non-Swiss citizens, and in same time span there were 277 deaths of Swiss citizens and 19 non-Swiss citizen deaths. Ignoring immigration and emigration, the population of Swiss citizens increased by 3 while the foreign population increased by 97. There were 41 Swiss men and 62 Swiss women who immigrated back to Switzerland. At the same time, there were 263 non-Swiss men and 274 non-Swiss women who immigrated from another country to Switzerland. The total Swiss population change in 2008 (from all sources, including moves across municipal borders) was an increase of 382 and the non-Swiss population increased by 442 people. This represents a population growth rate of 2.4%.

The age distribution in Broye-Vully, as of 2009, was as follows:

Age bracket	Population	Fraction of total
0–9	3,883	11.0%
10–19	4,583	13.0%
20–29	4,261	12.1%
30–39	4,636	13.1%
40–49	5,714	16.2%
50–59	4,531	12.8%
60–69	3,666	10.4%
70–79	2,350	6.7%
80–89	1,404	4.0%
90–up	235	0.7%

== Mergers and name changes ==
On 1 September 2006, the Avenches district (District d'Avenches), Moudon district (District de Moudon), (District d'Oron) and Payerne district (District de Payerne) were all dissolved and merged into the Broye-Vully district.

- The municipalities of Avenches, Bellerive (VD), Chabrey, Constantine, Cudrefin, Faoug, Montmagny, Mur, Oleyres, Vallamand and Villars-le-Grand came from the Avenches district.
- The municipalities of Brenles, Bussy-sur-Moudon, Chavannes-sur-Moudon, Chesalles-sur-Moudon, Cremin, Curtilles, Dompierre, Forel-sur-Lucens, Hermenches, Lovatens, Lucens, Moudon, Oulens-sur-Lucens, Prévonloup, Rossenges, Sarzens, Syens, Villars-le-Comte and Vucherens came from the Moudon district (District de Moudon).
- The municipalities of Carrouge, Corcelles-le-Jorat, Ropraz and Vulliens came from the Oron district (District d'Oron).
- The municipalities of Cerniaz (VD), Champtauroz, Chevroux, Combremont-le-Grand, Combremont-le-Petit, Corcelles-près-Payerne, Grandcour, Granges-près-Marnand, Henniez, Marnand, Missy, Payerne, Sassel, Seigneux, Trey, Treytorrens (Payerne), Villars-Bramard and Villarzel came from the Payerne district (District de Payerne).
- On 1 July 2011, the municipalities of Cerniaz, Combremont-le-Grand, Combremont-le-Petit, Granges-près-Marnand, Marnand, Sassel, Seigneux and Villars-Bramard merged into the new municipality of Valbroye. The municipalities of Bellerive, Chabrey, Constantine, Montmagny, Mur (VD), Vallamand and Villars-le-Grand merged into the new municipality of Vully-les-Lacs.
- On 1 July 2016, the municipality of Carrouge and the municipalities of Mézières and Ferlens in the Lavaux-Oron District merged to form Jorat-Mézières in the other district.
- On 1 January 2017 the former municipalities of Brenles, Chesalles-sur-Moudon, Cremin, Forel-sur-Lucens and Sarzens merged into the municipality of Lucens.

== Politics ==
In the 2007 federal election the most popular party was the SVP which received 30.09% of the vote. The next three most popular parties were the FDP (22.1%), the SP (19.16%) and the Green Party (9.97%). In the federal election, a total of 9,180 votes were cast, and the voter turnout was 44.1%.

== Municipalities ==
Municipality	Population (31 December 2020)	Area km^{2}
Avenches	4,477	17.56
Bussy-sur-Moudon	218	3.09
Champtauroz	144	3.05
Chavannes-sur-Moudon	223	5.14
Chevroux	494	4.37
Corcelles-le-Jorat	451	7.93
Corcelles-près-Payerne	2,683	12.13
Cudrefin	1,780	15.82
Curtilles	300	4.95
Dompierre	245	3.21
Faoug	879	3.45
Grandcour	967	10.21
Henniez	391	2.61
Hermenches	382	4.77
Lovatens	142	3.47
Lucens	4,298	19.28
Missy	368	3.11
Moudon	6,101	15.69
Payerne	10,069	24.19
Prévonloup	202	1.84
Ropraz	529	4.83
Rossenges	84	1.07
Syens	156	2.52
Trey	302	3.81
Treytorrens (Payerne)	114	3.07
Valbroye	3,365	33.61
Villars-le-Comte	120	4.19
Villarzel	477	7.66
Vucherens	618	3.27
Vulliens	625	6.63
Vully-les-Lacs	3,348	24.4
Total (31)	44,552	264.98
