= Villars-Bramard =

- Former municipality
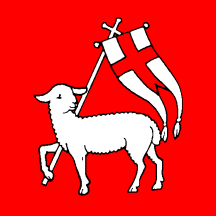
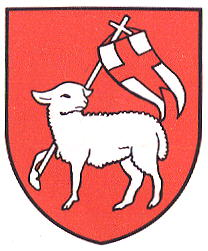
- Flag Coat of arms
- Location of Villars-Bramard
- Location within Switzerland Location within Canton of Vaud
- Coordinates: 46°43′N 6°54′E
- Country: Switzerland
- Canton: Vaud
- District: Broye-Vully

Area
  - Total: 3.20 km^{2} (1.24 sq mi)
- Elevation: 734 m (2,408 ft)

Population (2009)
  - Total: 119
  - Density: 37.2/km^{2} (96.3/sq mi)
- Time zone: UTC+01:00 (CET)
  - Summer (DST): UTC+02:00 (CEST)
- Postal code: 1682
- SFOS number: 5829
- ISO 3166 code: CH-VD
- Surrounded by: Cerniaz, Dompierre, Romont (FR), Rossens, Sédeilles, Seigneux, Villarzel
- Website: Profile (in French), SFSO statistics

Villars-Bramard is a former municipality in the district of Broye-Vully in the canton of Vaud in Switzerland.

The villages of Cerniaz, Combremont-le-Grand, Combremont-le-Petit, Granges-près-Marnand, Marnand, Sassel, Seigneux and Villars-Bramard merged on 1 July 2011 into the new municipality of Valbroye.

== Geography ==
Villars-Bramard has an area, as of 2009, of 3.2 square kilometers (1.2 mi^{2}). Of this area, 1.71 km^{2} (0.66 mi^{2}) or 54.1% is used for agricultural purposes, while 1.18 km^{2} (0.46 mi^{2}) or 37.3% is forested. Of the rest of the land, 0.2 km^{2} (0.077 mi^{2}) or 6.3% is settled (buildings or roads).

Of the built up area, housing and buildings made up 2.5% and transportation infrastructure made up 3.8%. Out of the forested land, all of the forested land area is covered with heavy forests. Of the agricultural land, 44.3% is used for growing crops and 8.2% is pastures, while 1.6% is used for orchards or vine crops.

The municipality was part of the Payerne District until it was dissolved on 31 August 2006, and Villars-Bramard became part of the new district of Broye-Vully.

== Coat of arms ==
The blazon of the municipal coat of arms is Gules, a Paschal Lamb carrying a Banner Argent crossed Gules.

== Demographics ==
Villars-Bramard has a population (As of December 2009) of 119. As of 2008, 8.3% of the population are resident foreign nationals. Over the last 10 years (1999-2009 ) the population has changed at a rate of 2.6%. It has changed at a rate of -4.3% due to migration and at a rate of 6.9% due to births and deaths.

Most of the population (as of 2000) speaks French (114 or 96.6%), with German being second most common (2 or 1.7%) and Portuguese being third (1 or 0.8%).

Of the population in the village 54 or about 45.8% were born in Villars-Bramard and lived there in 2000. There were 39 or 33.1% who were born in the same canton, while 17 or 14.4% were born somewhere else in Switzerland, and 8 or 6.8% were born outside of Switzerland.

In 2008 there was 1 live birth to Swiss citizens. Ignoring immigration and emigration, the population of Swiss citizens increased by 1 while the foreign population remained the same. The total Swiss population change in 2008 (from all sources, including moves across municipal borders) was a decrease of 2 and the non-Swiss population increased by 2 people. This represents a population growth rate of 0.0%.

The age distribution, as of 2009, in Villars-Bramard is; 11 children or 9.2% of the population are between 0 and 9 years old and 24 teenagers or 20.2% are between 10 and 19. Of the adult population, 10 people or 8.4% of the population are between 20 and 29 years old. 16 people or 13.4% are between 30 and 39, 19 people or 16.0% are between 40 and 49, and 11 people or 9.2% are between 50 and 59. The senior population distribution is 14 people or 11.8% of the population are between 60 and 69 years old, 10 people or 8.4% are between 70 and 79, there are 4 people or 3.4% who are between 80 and 89.

As of 2000, there were 52 people who were single and never married in the village. There were 49 married individuals, 7 widows or widowers and 10 individuals who are divorced.

As of 2000, there were 47 private households in the village, and an average of 2.5 persons per household. There were 15 households that consist of only one person and 5 households with five or more people. Out of a total of 48 households that answered this question, 31.3% were households made up of just one person. Of the rest of the households, there are 8 married couples without children, 18 married couples with children There were 5 single parents with a child or children. There was 1 household that was made up of unrelated people and 1 household that was made up of some sort of institution or another collective housing.

In 2000 there were 13 single family homes (or 40.6% of the total) out of a total of 32 inhabited buildings. There were 7 multi-family buildings (21.9%) and along with 12 multi-purpose buildings that were mostly used for housing (37.5%). Of the single family homes 9 were built before 1919, while 1 was built between 1990 and 2000. The most multi-family homes (4) were built before 1919 and the next most (1) were built between 1981 and 1990. There was 1 multi-family house built between 1996 and 2000.

In 2000 there were 48 apartments in the village. The most common apartment size was 5 rooms of which there were 14. There were single room apartments and 25 apartments with five or more rooms. Of these apartments, a total of 43 apartments (89.6% of the total) were permanently occupied, while 3 apartments (6.3%) were seasonally occupied and 2 apartments (4.2%) were empty. As of 2009, the construction rate of new housing units was 0 new units per 1000 residents. The vacancy rate for the village, in 2010, was 0%.

The historical population is given in the following chart:

== Politics ==
In the 2007 federal election the most popular party was the SVP which received 45.75% of the vote. The next three most popular parties were the FDP (13.33%), the SP (12.38%) and the Green Party (10.26%). In the federal election, a total of 49 votes were cast, and the voter turnout was 59.0%.

== Economy ==
As of 2010, Villars-Bramard had an unemployment rate of 1.6%. As of 2008, there were 26 people employed in the primary economic sector and about 9 businesses involved in this sector. 3 people were employed in the secondary sector and there were 2 businesses in this sector. 2 people were employed in the tertiary sector, with 1 business in this sector. There were 58 residents of the village who were employed in some capacity, of which females made up 43.1% of the workforce.

In 2008 the total number of full-time equivalent jobs was 22. The number of jobs in the primary sector was 18, all of which were in agriculture. The number of jobs in the secondary sector was 2, all of which were in construction. The number of jobs in the tertiary sector was 2. In the tertiary sector; .

In 2000, there were 3 workers who commuted into the village and 34 workers who commuted away. The village is a net exporter of workers, with about 11.3 workers leaving the village for every one entering. Of the working population, 8.6% used public transportation to get to work, and 56.9% used a private car.

== Religion ==
From the 2000 census, 21 or 17.8% were Roman Catholic, while 77 or 65.3% belonged to the Swiss Reformed Church. Of the rest of the population, there were 2 members of an Orthodox church (or about 1.69% of the population). 16 (or about 13.56% of the population) belonged to no church, are agnostic or atheist, and 2 individuals (or about 1.69% of the population) did not answer the question.

== Education ==
In Villars-Bramard about 44 or (37.3%) of the population have completed non-mandatory upper secondary education, and 11 or (9.3%) have completed additional higher education (either University or a Fachhochschule). Of the 11 who completed tertiary schooling, 63.6% were Swiss men, 9.1% were Swiss women.

In the 2009/2010 school year there were a total of 19 students in the Villars-Bramard school district. In the Vaud cantonal school system, two years of non-obligatory pre-school are provided by the political districts. During the school year, the political district provided pre-school care for a total of 155 children of which 83 children (53.5%) received subsidized pre-school care. The canton's primary school program requires students to attend for four years. There were 5 students in the municipal primary school program. The obligatory lower secondary school program lasts for six years and there were 13 students in those schools. There were also 1 students who were home schooled or attended another non-traditional school.

As of 2000, there were 9 students in Villars-Bramard who came from another village, while 20 residents attended schools outside the village.
