= Combremont-le-Grand =

- Former municipality
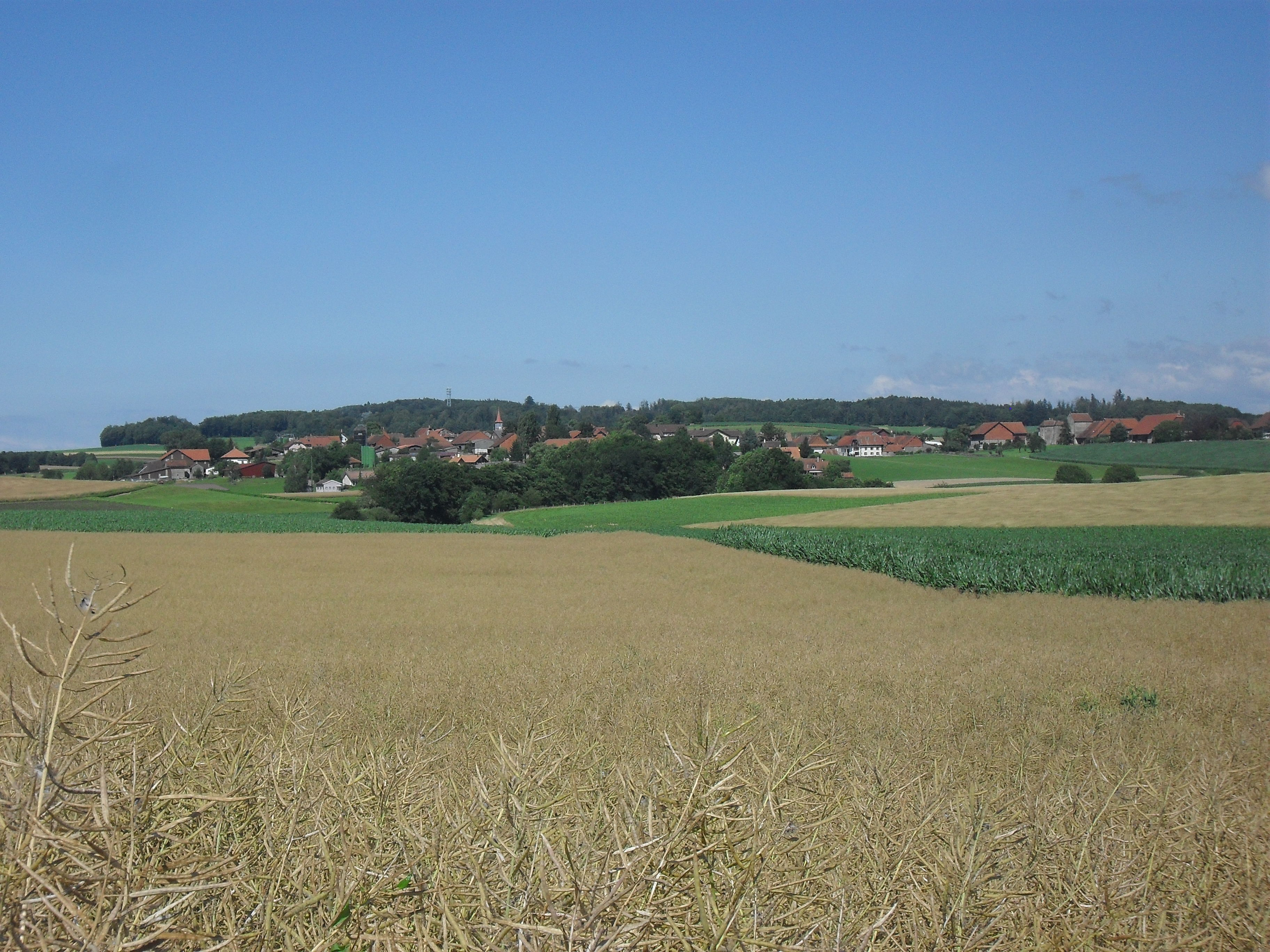

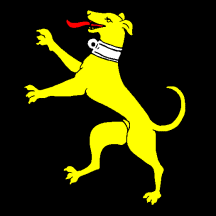
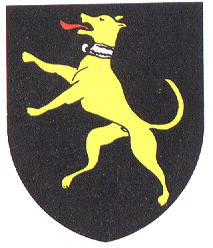
- Flag Coat of arms
- Location of Combremont-le-Grand
- Location within Switzerland Location within Canton of Vaud
- Coordinates: 46°46′N 6°49′E
- Country: Switzerland
- Canton: Vaud
- District: Broye-Vully

Area
  - Total: 6.61 km^{2} (2.55 sq mi)
- Elevation: 674 m (2,211 ft)

Population (2009)
  - Total: 302
  - Density: 45.7/km^{2} (118/sq mi)
- Time zone: UTC+01:00 (CET)
  - Summer (DST): UTC+02:00 (CEST)
- Postal code: 1535
- SFOS number: 5814
- ISO 3166 code: CH-VD
- Surrounded by: Champtauroz, Cheiry (FR), Combremont-le-Petit, Nuvilly (FR), Sassel, Treytorrens (Payerne)
- Website: Profile (in French), SFSO statistics

Combremont-le-Grand is a former municipality in the district of Broye-Vully in the canton of Vaud in Switzerland.

The municipalities of Cerniaz, Combremont-le-Grand, Combremont-le-Petit, Granges-près-Marnand, Marnand, Sassel, Seigneux and Villars-Bramard merged on 1 July 2011 into the new municipality of Valbroye.

== History ==
Combremont-le-Grand is first mentioned in 911 as Cumbromo. In 1142 it was mentioned as Combremont.

== Geography ==
Combremont-le-Grand has an area, as of 2009, of 6.6 square kilometers (2.5 sq mi). Of this area, 4.95 km^{2} (1.91 sq mi) or 75.0% is used for agricultural purposes, while 1.33 km^{2} (0.51 sq mi) or 20.2% is forested. Of the rest of the land, 0.31 km^{2} (0.12 sq mi) or 4.7% is settled (buildings or roads).

Of the built up area, housing and buildings made up 2.0% and transportation infrastructure made up 2.7%. Out of the forested land, 19.1% of the total land area is heavily forested and 1.1% is covered with orchards or small clusters of trees. Of the agricultural land, 60.3% is used for growing crops and 14.1% is pastures.

The municipality was part of the Payerne District until it was dissolved on 31 August 2006, and Combremont-le-Grand became part of the new district of Broye-Vully.

The village is located along the Payerne-Thierrens road.

== Coat of arms ==
The blazon of the municipal coat of arms is Sable, a Greyhound rampant Or langued Gules and gorged Argent.

== Demographics ==
Combremont-le-Grand has a population (as of 2009) of 302. As of 2008, 4.8% of the population are resident foreign nationals. Over the last 10 years (1999-2009 ) the population has changed at a rate of 0%. It has changed at a rate of 2.6% due to migration and at a rate of -2.6% due to births and deaths.

Most of the population (as of 2000) speaks French (286 or 92.9%), with German being second most common (15 or 4.9%) and Portuguese being third (4 or 1.3%).

Of the population in the municipality 155 or about 50.3% were born in Combremont-le-Grand and lived there in 2000. There were 84 or 27.3% who were born in the same canton, while 40 or 13.0% were born somewhere else in Switzerland, and 28 or 9.1% were born outside of Switzerland.

In 2008 there were 2 live births to Swiss citizens and were 5 deaths of Swiss citizens. Ignoring immigration and emigration, the population of Swiss citizens decreased by 3 while the foreign population remained the same. There were 2 Swiss women who emigrated from Switzerland. At the same time, there were 2 non-Swiss women who immigrated from another country to Switzerland. The total Swiss population change in 2008 (from all sources, including moves across municipal borders) was an increase of 8 and the non-Swiss population increased by 6 people. This represents a population growth rate of 5.1%.

The age distribution, as of 2009, in Combremont-le-Grand is; 31 children or 10.3% of the population are between 0 and 9 years old and 42 teenagers or 13.9% are between 10 and 19. Of the adult population, 36 people or 11.9% of the population are between 20 and 29 years old. 40 people or 13.2% are between 30 and 39, 41 people or 13.6% are between 40 and 49, and 50 people or 16.6% are between 50 and 59. The senior population distribution is 25 people or 8.3% of the population are between 60 and 69 years old, 25 people or 8.3% are between 70 and 79, there are 12 people or 4.0% who are between 80 and 89.

As of 2000, there were 129 people who were single and never married in the municipality. There were 153 married individuals, 19 widows or widowers and 7 individuals who are divorced.

As of 2000 the average number of residents per living room was 0.57 which is about equal to the cantonal average of 0.61 per room. In this case, a room is defined as space of a housing unit of at least 4 m^{2} (43 sq ft) as normal bedrooms, dining rooms, living rooms, kitchens and habitable cellars and attics. About 62.6% of the total households were owner occupied, or in other words did not pay rent (though they may have a mortgage or a rent-to-own agreement).

As of 2000, there were 116 private households in the municipality, and an average of 2.6 persons per household. There were 32 households that consist of only one person and 14 households with five or more people. Out of a total of 119 households that answered this question, 26.9% were households made up of just one person and there was 1 adult who lived with their parents. Of the rest of the households, there are 29 married couples without children, 49 married couples with children There were 4 single parents with a child or children. There was 1 household that was made up of unrelated people and 3 households that were made up of some sort of institution or another collective housing.

In 2000 there were 39 single family homes (or 43.3% of the total) out of a total of 90 inhabited buildings. There were 13 multi-family buildings (14.4%), along with 34 multi-purpose buildings that were mostly used for housing (37.8%) and 4 other use buildings (commercial or industrial) that also had some housing (4.4%). Of the single family homes 18 were built before 1919, while 4 were built between 1990 and 2000. The most multi-family homes (7) were built before 1919 and the next most (2) were built between 1961 and 1970.

In 2000 there were 126 apartments in the municipality. The most common apartment size was 5 rooms of which there were 32. There were 3 single room apartments and 59 apartments with five or more rooms. Of these apartments, a total of 107 apartments (84.9% of the total) were permanently occupied, while 13 apartments (10.3%) were seasonally occupied and 6 apartments (4.8%) were empty. As of 2009, the construction rate of new housing units was 3.3 new units per 1000 residents. The vacancy rate for the municipality, in 2010, was 0%.

The historical population is given in the following chart:

== Politics ==
In the 2007 federal election the most popular party was the SVP which received 48.08% of the vote. The next three most popular parties were the FDP (19.21%), the SP (6.87%) and the CVP (6.62%). In the federal election, a total of 116 votes were cast, and the voter turnout was 55.0%.

== Economy ==
As of 2010, Combremont-le-Grand had an unemployment rate of 1.2%. As of 2008, there were 58 people employed in the primary economic sector and about 23 businesses involved in this sector. 10 people were employed in the secondary sector and there were 2 businesses in this sector. 31 people were employed in the tertiary sector, with 10 businesses in this sector. There were 149 residents of the municipality who were employed in some capacity, of which females made up 40.3% of the workforce.

In 2008 the total number of full-time equivalent jobs was 77. The number of jobs in the primary sector was 43, all of which were in agriculture. The number of jobs in the secondary sector was 10 of which 3 or (30.0%) were in manufacturing and 7 (70.0%) were in construction. The number of jobs in the tertiary sector was 24. In the tertiary sector; 13 or 54.2% were in the sale or repair of motor vehicles, 2 or 8.3% were in a hotel or restaurant, 1 was a technical professional or scientist, 1 was in education and 4 or 16.7% were in health care.

In 2000, there were 12 workers who commuted into the municipality and 67 workers who commuted away. The municipality is a net exporter of workers, with about 5.6 workers leaving the municipality for every one entering. Of the working population, 3.4% used public transportation to get to work, and 47.7% used a private car.

== Religion ==
From the 2000 census, 55 or 17.9% were Roman Catholic, while 222 or 72.1% belonged to the Swiss Reformed Church. Of the rest of the population, there was 1 member of an Orthodox church who belonged, and there were 7 individuals (or about 2.27% of the population) who belonged to another Christian church. There were 9 (or about 2.92% of the population) who were Islamic. 11 (or about 3.57% of the population) belonged to no church, are agnostic or atheist, and 3 individuals (or about 0.97% of the population) did not answer the question.

== Education ==
In Combremont-le-Grand about 122 or (39.6%) of the population have completed non-mandatory upper secondary education, and 25 or (8.1%) have completed additional higher education (either University or a Fachhochschule). Of the 25 who completed tertiary schooling, 72.0% were Swiss men, 24.0% were Swiss women.

In the 2009/2010 school year there were a total of 43 students in the Combremont-le-Grand school district. In the Vaud cantonal school system, two years of non-obligatory pre-school are provided by the political districts. During the school year, the political district provided pre-school care for a total of 155 children of which 83 children (53.5%) received subsidized pre-school care. The canton's primary school program requires students to attend for four years. There were 16 students in the municipal primary school program. The obligatory lower secondary school program lasts for six years and there were 27 students in those schools.

As of 2000, there were 17 students in Combremont-le-Grand who came from another municipality, while 45 residents attended schools outside the municipality.
