= Combremont-le-Petit =

- Former municipality
- Flag Coat of arms
- Location of Combremont-le-Petit
- Location within Switzerland Location within Canton of Vaud
- Coordinates: 46°45′N 6°49′E
- Country: Switzerland
- Canton: Vaud
- District: Broye-Vully

Area
  - Total: 5.73 km^{2} (2.21 sq mi)
- Elevation: 665 m (2,182 ft)

Population (2009)
  - Total: 378
  - Density: 66.0/km^{2} (171/sq mi)
- Time zone: UTC+01:00 (CET)
  - Summer (DST): UTC+02:00 (CEST)
- Postal code: 1536
- SFOS number: 5815
- ISO 3166 code: CH-VD
- Surrounded by: Champtauroz, Cheiry (FR), Combremont-le-Grand, Denezy, Prévondavaux (FR), Vuissens (FR)
- Website: www.combremont-le-petit.ch

Combremont-le-Petit is a former municipality in the district of Broye-Vully in the canton of Vaud in Switzerland.

The municipalities of Cerniaz, Combremont-le-Grand, Combremont-le-Petit, Granges-près-Marnand, Marnand, Sassel, Seigneux and Villars-Bramard merged on 1 July 2011 into the new municipality of Valbroye.

== History ==
Combremont-le-Petit is first mentioned in 911 as Cumbromo. In 1142 it was mentioned as Combremont.

== Geography ==
Combremont-le-Petit has an area, as of 2009, of 5.73 square kilometers (2.21 sq mi). Of this area, 4.15 km^{2} (1.60 sq mi) or 72.4% is used for agricultural purposes, while 1.31 km^{2} (0.51 sq mi) or 22.9% is forested. Of the rest of the land, 0.28 km^{2} (0.11 sq mi) or 4.9% is settled (buildings or roads).

Of the built up area, housing and buildings made up 2.1% and transportation infrastructure made up 2.4%. Out of the forested land, 20.9% of the total land area is heavily forested and 1.9% is covered with orchards or small clusters of trees. Of the agricultural land, 60.0% is used for growing crops and 11.2% is pastures, while 1.2% is used for orchards or vine crops.

The municipality was part of the Payerne District until it was dissolved on 31 August 2006, and Combremont-le-Petit became part of the new district of Broye-Vully.

== Coat of arms ==
The blazon of the municipal coat of arms is Azure, a Deer's Head gardant Or, between the antlers a Mullet (of six) Argent.

== Demographics ==
Combremont-le-Petit has a population (as of 2009) of 378. As of 2008, 6.9% of the population are resident foreign nationals. Over the last 10 years (1999–2009 ) the population has changed at a rate of 3%. It has changed at a rate of 2.7% due to migration and at a rate of 0.3% due to births and deaths.

Most of the population (as of 2000) speaks French (343 or 93.2%), with German being second most common (12 or 3.3%) and English being third (5 or 1.4%). There are 2 people who speak Italian.

Of the population in the municipality 137 or about 37.2% were born in Combremont-le-Petit and lived there in 2000. There were 125 or 34.0% who were born in the same canton, while 76 or 20.7% were born somewhere else in Switzerland, and 25 or 6.8% were born outside of Switzerland.

In 2008 there was 1 live birth to Swiss citizens and were 3 deaths of Swiss citizens. Ignoring immigration and emigration, the population of Swiss citizens decreased by 2 while the foreign population remained the same. There were 2 Swiss women who immigrated back to Switzerland. At the same time, there was 1 non-Swiss man who emigrated from Switzerland to another country and 3 non-Swiss women who immigrated from another country to Switzerland. The total Swiss population change in 2008 (from all sources, including moves across municipal borders) was an increase of 2 and the non-Swiss population decreased by 4 people. This represents a population growth rate of -0.5%.

The age distribution, as of 2009, in Combremont-le-Petit is; 36 children or 9.5% of the population are between 0 and 9 years old and 60 teenagers or 15.9% are between 10 and 19. Of the adult population, 39 people or 10.3% of the population are between 20 and 29 years old. 51 people or 13.5% are between 30 and 39, 58 people or 15.3% are between 40 and 49, and 48 people or 12.7% are between 50 and 59. The senior population distribution is 45 people or 11.9% of the population are between 60 and 69 years old, 31 people or 8.2% are between 70 and 79, there are 7 people or 1.9% who are between 80 and 89, and there are 3 people or 0.8% who are 90 and older.

As of 2000, there were 158 people who were single and never married in the municipality. There were 188 married individuals, 12 widows or widowers and 10 individuals who are divorced.

As of 2000 the average number of residents per living room was 0.57 which is about equal to the cantonal average of 0.61 per room. In this case, a room is defined as space of a housing unit of at least 4 m^{2} (43 sq ft) as normal bedrooms, dining rooms, living rooms, kitchens and habitable cellars and attics. About 60.7% of the total households were owner occupied, or in other words did not pay rent (though they may have a mortgage or a rent-to-own agreement).

As of 2000, there were 133 private households in the municipality, and an average of 2.7 persons per household. There were 24 households that consist of only one person and 15 households with five or more people. Out of a total of 135 households that answered this question, 17.8% were households made up of just one person. Of the rest of the households, there are 48 married couples without children, 51 married couples with children There were 6 single parents with a child or children. There were 4 households that were made up of unrelated people and 2 households that were made up of some sort of institution or another collective housing.

In 2000 there were 61 single family homes (or 57.5% of the total) out of a total of 106 inhabited buildings. There were 13 multi-family buildings (12.3%), along with 27 multi-purpose buildings that were mostly used for housing (25.5%) and 5 other use buildings (commercial or industrial) that also had some housing (4.7%). Of the single family homes 21 were built before 1919, while 2 were built between 1990 and 2000. The greatest number of multi-family homes (4) were built before 1919 and again between 1919 and 1945. There was 1 multi-family house built between 1996 and 2000.

In 2000 there were 133 apartments in the municipality. The most common apartment size was 4 rooms of which there were 39. There were 4 single room apartments and 62 apartments with five or more rooms. Of these apartments, a total of 117 apartments (88.0% of the total) were permanently occupied, while 10 apartments (7.5%) were seasonally occupied and 6 apartments (4.5%) were empty. As of 2009, the construction rate of new housing units was 0 new units per 1000 residents. The vacancy rate for the municipality, in 2010, was 3.52%.

The historical population is given in the following chart:

== Sights ==
The entire village of Combremont-le-Petit is designated as part of the Inventory of Swiss Heritage Sites.

== Politics ==
In the 2007 federal election the most popular party was the SVP which received 24.18% of the vote. The next three most popular parties were the FDP (18.67%), the SP (18.51%) and the Green Party (10.76%). In the federal election, a total of 115 votes were cast, and the voter turnout was 44.4%.

== Economy ==
As of 2010, Combremont-le-Petit had an unemployment rate of 4.3%. As of 2008, there were 36 people employed in the primary economic sector and about 14 businesses involved in this sector. 14 people were employed in the secondary sector and there were 5 businesses in this sector. 22 people were employed in the tertiary sector, with 12 businesses in this sector. There were 168 residents of the municipality who were employed in some capacity, of which females made up 40.5% of the workforce.

In 2008 the total number of full-time equivalent jobs was 51. The number of jobs in the primary sector was 24, of which 22 were in agriculture and 2 were in forestry or lumber production. The number of jobs in the secondary sector was 12 of which 10 or (83.3%) were in manufacturing and 2 (16.7%) were in construction. The number of jobs in the tertiary sector was 15. In the tertiary sector; 3 or 20.0% were in the sale or repair of motor vehicles, 2 or 13.3% were in the movement and storage of goods, 4 or 26.7% were in a hotel or restaurant, 1 was the insurance or financial industry, 3 or 20.0% were technical professionals or scientists, 2 or 13.3% were in education.

In 2000, there were 31 workers who commuted into the municipality and 97 workers who commuted away. The municipality is a net exporter of workers, with about 3.1 workers leaving the municipality for every one entering. Of the working population, 4.8% used public transportation to get to work, and 58.9% used a private car.

== Religion ==
From the 2000 census, 53 or 14.4% were Roman Catholic, while 250 or 67.9% belonged to the Swiss Reformed Church. Of the rest of the population, and there were 11 individuals (or about 2.99% of the population) who belonged to another Christian church. There was 1 person who was Buddhist and 2 individuals who belonged to another church. 48 (or about 13.04% of the population) belonged to no church, are agnostic or atheist, and 3 individuals (or about 0.82% of the population) did not answer the question.

== Education ==
In Combremont-le-Petit about 137 or (37.2%) of the population have completed non-mandatory upper secondary education, and 33 or (9.0%) have completed additional higher education (either University or a Fachhochschule). Of the 33 who completed tertiary schooling, 69.7% were Swiss men, 24.2% were Swiss women.

In the 2009/2010 school year there were a total of 50 students in the Combremont-le-Petit school district. In the Vaud cantonal school system, two years of non-obligatory pre-school are provided by the political districts. During the school year, the political district provided pre-school care for a total of 155 children of which 83 children (53.5%) received subsidized pre-school care. The canton's primary school program requires students to attend for four years. There were 22 students in the municipal primary school program. The obligatory lower secondary school program lasts for six years and there were 28 students in those schools.

As of 2000, there were 30 students in Combremont-le-Petit who came from another municipality, while 63 residents attended schools outside the municipality.
