= Oulens =

Oulens may refer to:

- Oulens-sur-Lucens, Vaud, Switzerland
- Oulens-sous-Échallens, Vaud, Switzerland
