= Prévondavaux =

- Municipality
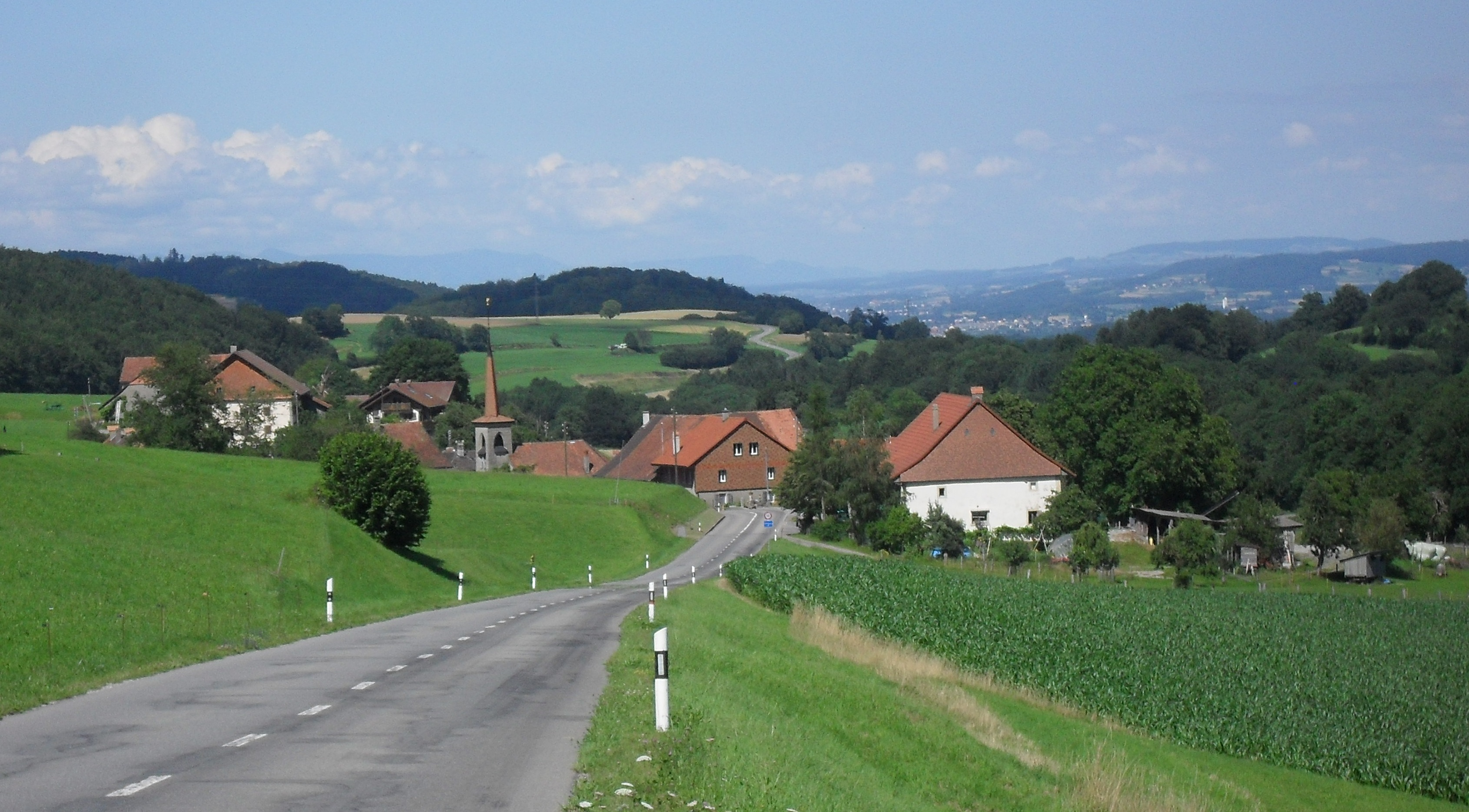

- Coat of arms
- Location of Prévondavaux
- Location within Switzerland Location within Canton of Fribourg
- Coordinates: 46°43.67′N 6°47.6′E
- Country: Switzerland
- Canton: Fribourg
- District: Broye

Government
  - Mayor: Syndic

Area
  - Total: 1.80 km^{2} (0.69 sq mi)
- Elevation: 688 m (2,257 ft)

Population (December 2020)
  - Total: 83
  - Density: 46/km^{2} (120/sq mi)
- Time zone: UTC+01:00 (CET)
  - Summer (DST): UTC+02:00 (CEST)
- Postal code: 1410
- SFOS number: 2038
- ISO 3166 code: CH-FR
- Surrounded by: Cheiry, Combremont-le-Petit (VD), Denezy (VD), Forel-sur-Lucens (VD), Villars-le-Comte (VD)
- Website: prevondavaux.ch

Prévondavaux (Arpitan: Provondavâlx, locally Prèvondavô [pʁɛvɔ̃daˈvo]) is a municipality in the district of Broye in the canton of Fribourg in Switzerland.

== History ==
Prévondavaux is first mentioned in 1403 as Profunda vallis. The municipality was formerly known by its German name Tiefental, however, that name is no longer used.

== Geography ==
Prévondavaux has an area, as of 2009, of 1.8 square kilometers (0.69 mi^{2}). Of this area, 1.15 km^{2} (0.44 mi^{2}) or 63.9% is used for agricultural purposes, while 0.59 km^{2} (0.23 mi^{2}) or 32.8% is forested. Of the rest of the land, 0.09 km^{2} (22 acres) or 5.0% is settled (buildings or roads).

Of the built up area, housing and buildings made up 2.8% and transportation infrastructure made up 2.2%. Out of the forested land, 25.6% of the total land area is heavily forested and 7.2% is covered with orchards or small clusters of trees. Of the agricultural land, 33.3% is used for growing crops and 30.0% is pastures.

The municipality is located in the Broye district, in the far western corner of the Surpierre exclave.

== Coat of arms ==
The blazon of the municipal coat of arms is Gules, on a Bend wavy Argent in chief a Mullet of Five Or.

== Demographics ==
Prévondavaux has a population (as of December 2020) of 83. As of 2008, 9.2% of the population are resident foreign nationals. Over the last 10 years (2000–2010) the population has changed at a rate of 14.5%. Migration accounted for 1.8%, while births and deaths accounted for 12.7%.

Most of the population (as of 2000) speaks French (57 or 90.5%) as their first language, German is the second most common (5 or 7.9%) and Italian is the third (1 or 1.6%).

As of 2008, the population was 58.8% male and 41.2% female. The population was made up of 36 Swiss men (52.9% of the population) and 4 (5.9%) non-Swiss men. There were 24 Swiss women (35.3%) and 4 (5.9%) non-Swiss women. Of the population in the municipality, 23 or about 36.5% were born in Prévondavaux and lived there in 2000. There were 6 or 9.5% who were born in the same canton, while 26 or 41.3% were born somewhere else in Switzerland, and 8 or 12.7% were born outside of Switzerland.

The age distribution, as of 2000, in Prévondavaux is; 9 children or 14.3% of the population are between 0 and 9 years old and 8 teenagers or 12.7% are between 10 and 19. Of the adult population, 13 people or 20.6% of the population are between 20 and 29 years old. 10 people or 15.9% are between 30 and 39, 7 people or 11.1% are between 40 and 49, and 10 people or 15.9% are between 50 and 59. The senior population distribution is 2 people or 3.2% of the population are between 60 and 69 years old, 2 people or 3.2% are between 70 and 79, there are 2 people or 3.2% who are between 80 and 89.

As of 2000, there were 29 people who were single and never married in the municipality. There were 29 married individuals, 3 widows or widowers and 2 individuals who are divorced.

As of 2000, there were 23 private households in the municipality, and an average of 2.7 persons per household. There were 3 households that consist of only one person and 2 households with five or more people. In 2000, a total of 22 apartments (71.0% of the total) were permanently occupied, while 7 apartments (22.6%) were seasonally occupied and 2 apartments (6.5%) were empty. The vacancy rate for the municipality, in 2010, was 3.13%.

The historical population is given in the following chart:

== Politics ==
In the 2011 federal election the most popular party was the SVP which received 46.5% of the vote. The next three most popular parties were the SP (23.9%), the FDP (14.2%) and the CVP (11.0%).

The SVP gained an additional 10.4% of the vote from the 2007 Federal election (36.0% in 2007 vs 46.5% in 2011). The SPS gained popularity (18.6% in 2007), the FDP moved from below fourth place in 2007 to third and the CVP moved from third in 2007 (with 16.2%) to fourth. A total of 23 votes were cast in this election.

== Economy ==
As of 2010, Prévondavaux had an unemployment rate of 2.8%. As of 2008, there were 15 people employed in the primary economic sector and about 5 businesses involved in this sector. 2 people were employed in the secondary sector and there was 1 business in this sector. 4 people were employed in the tertiary sector, with 3 businesses in this sector. There were 37 residents of the municipality who were employed in some capacity, of which females made up 40.5% of the workforce.

In 2008 the total number of full-time equivalent jobs was 15. The number of jobs in the primary sector was 10, all of which were in agriculture. The number of jobs in the secondary sector was 2, both in construction. The number of jobs in the tertiary sector was 3, of which 1 was in the movement and storage of goods and 1 was in education.

In 2000, there were 1 workers who commuted into the municipality and 22 workers who commuted away. The municipality is a net exporter of workers, with about 22.0 workers leaving the municipality for every one entering.

== Religion ==
From the 2000 census, 28 or 44.4% were Roman Catholic, while 19 or 30.2% belonged to the Swiss Reformed Church. There were 9 (or about 14.29% of the population) who were Islamic. 6 (or about 9.52% of the population) belonged to no church, are agnostic or atheist, and 1 individual (or about 1.59% of the population) did not answer the question.

== Education ==
In Prévondavaux about 24 or (38.1%) of the population have completed non-mandatory upper secondary education, and 6 or (9.5%) have completed additional higher education (either university or a Fachhochschule). Of the 6 who completed tertiary schooling, half were Swiss men, half were Swiss women.

The Canton of Fribourg school system provides one year of non-obligatory Kindergarten, followed by six years of Primary school. This is followed by three years of obligatory lower Secondary school where the students are separated according to ability and aptitude. Following the lower Secondary students may attend a three or four year optional upper Secondary school. The upper Secondary school is divided into gymnasium (university preparatory) and vocational programs. After they finish the upper Secondary program, students may choose to attend a Tertiary school or continue their apprenticeship.

During the 2010–11 school year, there were a total of 16 students attending one class in Prévondavaux. A total of 13 students from the municipality attended any school, either in the municipality or outside of it. There were no kindergarten classes in the municipality, but 5 students attended kindergarten in a neighboring municipality. The municipality had one primary class and 16 students. There were no upper Secondary classes or vocational classes. who attended classes in another municipality. The municipality had no non-university Tertiary classes. who attended classes in another municipality.

As of 2000, there were 9 students in Prévondavaux who came from another municipality, while 4 residents attended schools outside the municipality.
