= Cremin =

- Former municipality
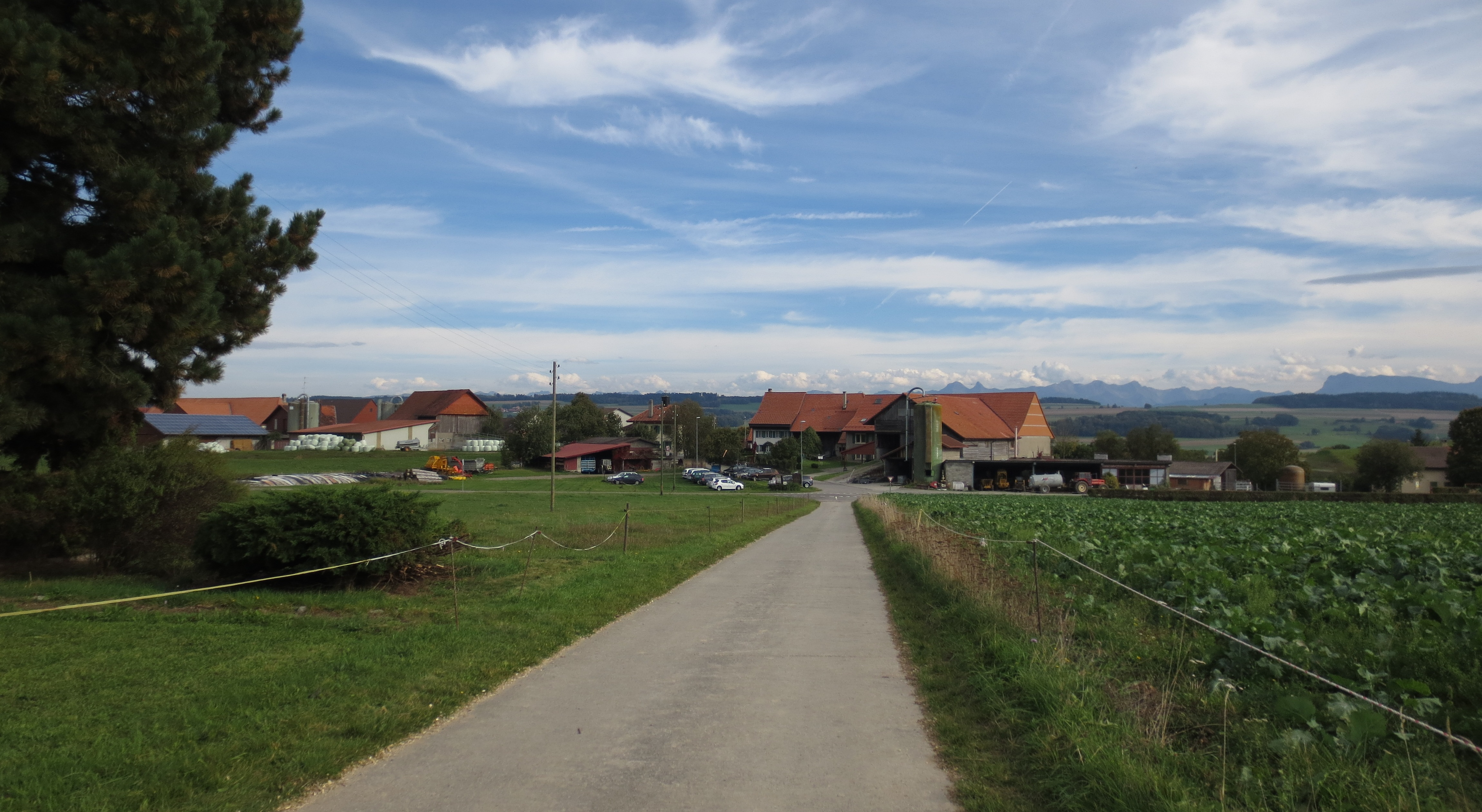

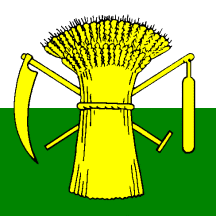
- Flag Coat of arms
- Location of Cremin
- Location within Switzerland Location within Canton of Vaud
- Coordinates: 46°43′N 6°50′E
- Country: Switzerland
- Canton: Vaud
- District: Broye-Vully

Government
  - Mayor: Syndic; Jean-Willy Badoux

Area
  - Total: 1.65 km^{2} (0.64 sq mi)
- Elevation: 641 m (2,103 ft)

Population (2000)
  - Total: 54
  - Density: 33/km^{2} (85/sq mi)
- Demonym: Les Creminois
- Time zone: UTC+01:00 (CET)
  - Summer (DST): UTC+02:00 (CEST)
- Postal code: 1526
- SFOS number: 5668
- ISO 3166 code: CH-VD
- Surrounded by: Forel-sur-Lucens, Lucens, Surpierre (FR), Villeneuve (FR)
- Website: Profile (in French), SFSO statistics

Cremin (French pronunciation: [kʁəmɛ̃]) is a former municipality in the district Broye-Vully in the canton of Vaud in Switzerland. In 2017 the former municipalities of Cremin, Brenles, Chesalles-sur-Moudon, Forel-sur-Lucens and Sarzens merged into the municipality of Lucens.

== History ==
Cremin is first mentioned in 1365 as Cremyn.

== Geography ==
Cremin had an area, as of 2009, of 1.65 square kilometres (0.64 sq mi). Of this area, 1.12 km^{2} (0.43 sq mi) or 67.9% is used for agricultural purposes, while 0.42 km^{2} (0.16 sq mi) or 25.5% is forested. Of the rest of the land, 0.11 km^{2} (27 acres) or 6.7% is settled (buildings or roads).

Of the built up area, housing and buildings made up 2.4% and transport infrastructure made up 4.2%. Out of the forested land, 23.6% of the total land area is heavily forested and 1.8% is covered with orchards or small clusters of trees. Of the agricultural land, 46.1% is used for growing crops and 21.8% is pastures.

The former municipality was part of the Moudon District until it was dissolved on 31 August 2006, and Cremin became part of the new district of Broye-Vully.

The former municipality is located on a plateau above the left side of the Broye river, north of Lucens and on the border with the Fribourg exclave of Surpierre.

== Coat of arms ==
The blazon of the municipal coat of arms is Per fess Argent and Vert, overall crossed a Garb of Wheat, a Scythe and a Flail all of Or.

== Demographics ==
Cremin had a population (as of 2015) of 58. As of 2008, 9.4% of the population are resident foreign nationals. Over the last 10 years (1999–2009 ) the population has changed at a rate of -10.9%. It has changed at a rate of -10.9% due to migration and at a rate of 1.8% due to births and deaths.

Most of the population (as of 2000) speaks French (48 or 94.1%) with the rest speaking German.

Of the population in the municipality 25 or about 49.0% were born in Cremin and lived there in 2000. There were 13 or 25.5% who were born in the same canton, while 12 or 23.5% were born somewhere else in Switzerland, and 1 or 2.0% were born outside of Switzerland.

In 2008 there was 1 live birth to Swiss citizens. Ignoring immigration and emigration, the population of Swiss citizens increased by 1 while the foreign population remained the same. The total Swiss population change in 2008 (from all sources, including moves across municipal borders) was an increase of 3 and the non-Swiss population increased by 1 person. This represents a population growth rate of 8.2%.

The age distribution, as of 2009, in Cremin is; 2 children or 4.1% of the population are between 0 and 9 years old and 6 teenagers or 12.2% are between 10 and 19. Of the adult population, 5 people or 10.2% of the population are between 20 and 29 years old. 5 people or 10.2% are between 30 and 39, 10 people or 20.4% are between 40 and 49, and 9 people or 18.4% are between 50 and 59. The senior population distribution is 4 people or 8.2% of the population are between 60 and 69 years old, 4 people or 8.2% are between 70 and 79, there are 4 people or 8.2% who are between 80 and 89.

As of 2000, there were 20 people who were single and never married in the municipality. There were 26 married individuals, 4 widows or widowers and 1 individual who was divorced.

As of 2000, there were 18 private households in the municipality, and an average of 2.8 persons per household. There were 4 households that consist of only one person and 4 households with five or more people. Out of a total of 18 households that answered this question, 22.2% were households made up of just one person. Of the rest of the households, there are 5 married couples without children, 6 married couples with children. There were 2 single parents with a child or children. There was 1 household that was made up of unrelated people.

In 2000 there were 6 single family homes (or 35.3% of the total) out of a total of 17 inhabited buildings. There were 3 multi-family buildings (17.6%) and along with 8 multi-purpose buildings that were mostly used for housing (47.1%). Of the single-family homes 2 were built before 1919, while 1 was built between 1990 and 2000.

In 2000 there were 26 apartments in the municipality. The most common apartment size was 2 rooms of which there were 5. There were 1 single room apartments and 12 apartments with five or more rooms. Of these apartments, a total of 17 apartments (65.4% of the total) were permanently occupied, while 7 apartments (26.9%) were seasonally occupied and 2 apartments (7.7%) were empty. As of 2009, the construction rate of new housing units was 0 new units per 1000 residents. The vacancy rate for the municipality, in 2010, was 0%.

The historical population is given in the following chart:

== Politics ==
In the 2007 federal election the most popular party was the SVP which received 53.94% of the vote. The next three most popular parties were the Green Party (28.01%), the SP (9.72%) and the FDP (2.55%). In the federal election, a total of 24 votes were cast, and the voter turnout was 63.2%.

== Economy ==
As of 2010, Cremin had an unemployment rate of 6.5%. As of 2008, there were 19 people employed in the primary economic sector and about 6 businesses involved in this sector. people were employed in the secondary sector and there were businesses in this sector. 4 people were employed in the tertiary sector, with 1 business in this sector. There were 21 residents of the municipality who were employed in some capacity, of which females made up 33.3% of the workforce.

In 2008 the total number of full-time equivalent jobs was 14. The number of jobs in the primary sector was 12, all of which were in agriculture. There were no jobs in the secondary sector. The number of jobs in the tertiary sector was 2. In the tertiary sector, 2 or 100.0% were in a hotel or restaurant.

In 2000, there were 11 workers who commuted away from the municipality. Of the working population, 14.3% used public transportation to get to work, and 38.1% used a private car.

== Religion ==
From the 2000 census, 4 or 7.8% were Roman Catholic, while 44 or 86.3% belonged to the Swiss Reformed Church. 3 (or about 5.88% of the population) belonged to no church, are agnostic or atheist.

== Education ==
In Cremin about 20 or (39.2%) of the population have completed non-mandatory upper secondary education, and 5 or (9.8%) have completed additional higher education (either university or a Fachhochschule). Of the 5 who completed tertiary schooling, 40.0% were Swiss men, 40.0% were Swiss women.

In the 2009/2010 school year there were a total of 4 students in the Cremin school district. In the Vaud cantonal school system, two years of non-obligatory pre-school are provided by the political districts. During the school year, the political district provided pre-school care for a total of 155 children of which 83 children (53.5%) received subsidized pre-school care. The canton's primary school program requires students to attend for four years. There was 1 student in the municipal primary school program. The obligatory lower secondary school program lasts for six years and there were 3 students in those schools.

As of 2000, there were 10 students from Cremin who attended schools outside the municipality.
