= Lucens =

- Municipality
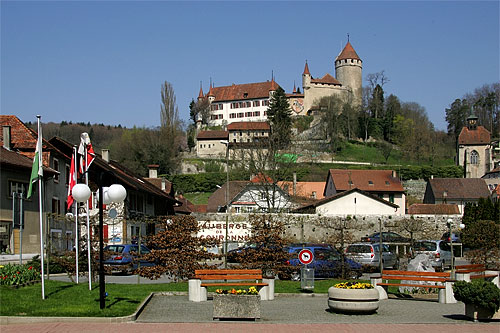
- Lucens village

- Flag Coat of arms
- Location of Lucens
- Location within Switzerland Location within Canton of Vaud
- Coordinates: 46°42′N 6°51′E
- Country: Switzerland
- Canton: Vaud
- District: Broye-Vully

Government
  - Mayor: Syndic

Area
  - Total: 6.28 km^{2} (2.42 sq mi)
- Elevation: 498 m (1,634 ft)

Population (December 2003)
  - Total: 2,157
  - Density: 343/km^{2} (890/sq mi)
- Time zone: UTC+01:00 (CET)
  - Summer (DST): UTC+02:00 (CEST)
- Postal code: 1522
- SFOS number: 5675
- ISO 3166 code: CH-VD
- Surrounded by: Bussy-sur-Moudon, Cremin, Curtilles, Forel-sur-Lucens, Moudon, Oulens-sur-Lucens, Seigneux, Surpierre (FR), Villeneuve (FR)
- Website: www.lucens.ch

Lucens (French pronunciation: [lysɑ̃]) is a municipality in the Broye-Vully district in the canton of Vaud in Switzerland. In 2017 the former municipalities of Brenles, Chesalles-sur-Moudon, Cremin, Forel-sur-Lucens and Sarzens merged into the municipality of Lucens.

== History ==
Lucens is first mentioned in 964 as in villa Losingus. It was formerly known by the German name Losingen.

In 1969 the Lucens reactor, an underground nuclear reactor, began operations. It was a pilot project to test a heavy-water moderated, carbon dioxide gas-cooled reactor. Soon after the initial start up, an undetected blockage in one of the cooling pipes led to a partial fuel meltdown and massive radioactive contamination of the underground site. Following the accident, the reactor was decommissioned and the cavern was then sealed. No humans were irradiated in the accident.

== Geography ==
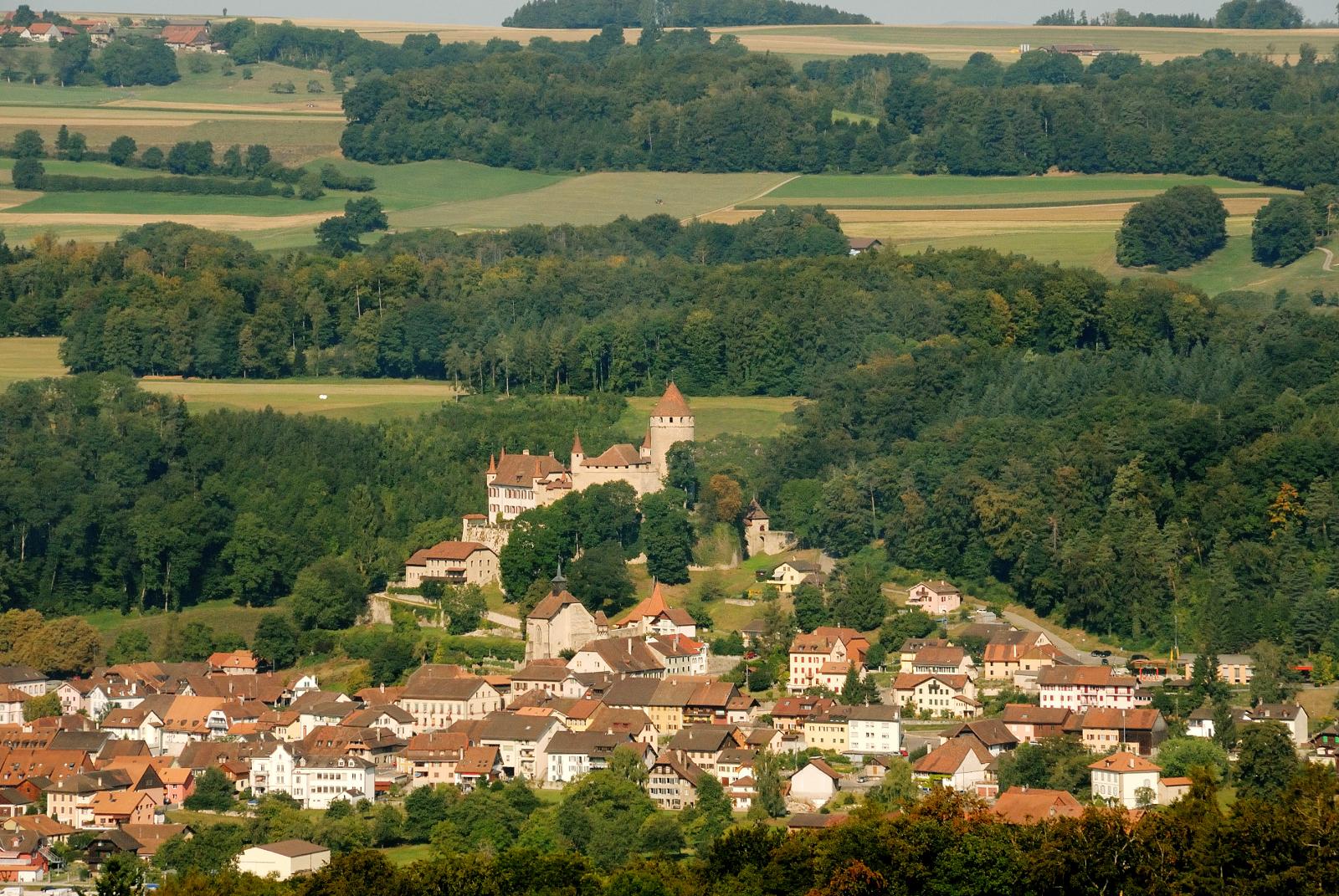
View of Lucens Castle and town along with surrounding countryside

Aerial view (1949)

After the 2017 merger Lucens had an area of 19.28 km^{2} (7.44 sq mi).

Before the merger Lucens had an area, (as of the 2004/09 survey) of 7.83 square kilometers (3.02 sq mi). Of this area, about 42.9% is used for agricultural purposes, while 36.8% is forested. Of the rest of the land, 18.0% is settled (buildings or roads) and 2.3% is unproductive land. In the 2013/18 survey a total of 94 ha (230 acres) or about 12.0% of the total area was covered with buildings, an increase of 32 ha (79 acres) over the 1981 amount. Over the same time period, the amount of recreational space in the municipality decreased by 1 ha (2.5 acres) and is now about 0.38% of the total area. Of the agricultural land, 3 ha (7.4 acres) is used for orchards and vineyards, 340 ha (840 acres) is fields and grasslands. Since 1981 the amount of agricultural land has decreased by 28 ha (69 acres). Over the same time period the amount of forested land has decreased by 5 ha (12 acres). Rivers and lakes cover 18 ha (44 acres) in the municipality.

The municipality was part of the Moudon District until it was dissolved on 31 August 2006, and Lucens became part of the new district of Broye-Vully.

The municipality is located along the left bank of the Broye.

The municipality of Oulens-sur-Lucens will merge on 1 July 2011 into the municipality of Lucens.

== Coat of arms ==
The blazon of the municipal coat of arms is Per bend Argent and Gules, overall a Sun in his splendour Or.

== Demographics ==
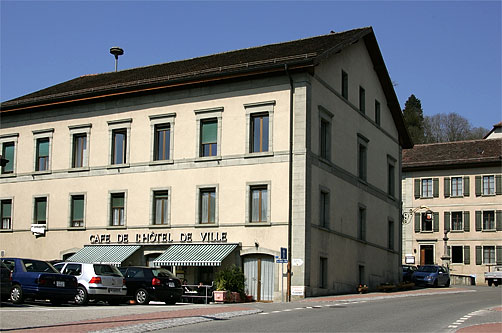
Town hall of Lucens

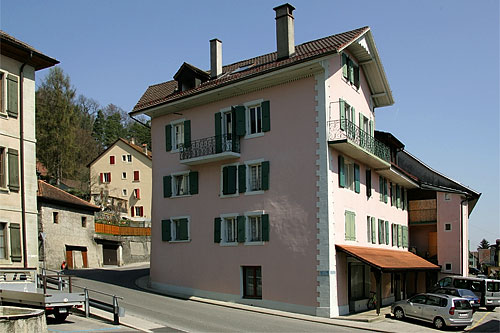
Houses in Lucens

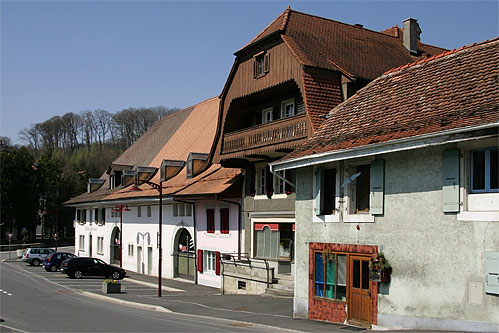
Main street in Lucens

Lucens has a population (as of December 2020) of 4,298. As of 2008, 31.2% of the population are resident foreign nationals. Over the last 10 years (1999–2009) the population has changed at a rate of 12.2%. It has changed at a rate of 10.8% due to migration and at a rate of 1.5% due to births and deaths.

Most of the population (as of 2000) speaks French (1,822 or 82.0%), with Italian being second most common (111 or 5.0%) and Albanian being third (77 or 3.5%). There are 44 people who speak German and 4 people who speak Romansh.

Of the population in the municipality 575 or about 25.9% were born in Lucens and lived there in 2000. There were 565 or 25.4% who were born in the same canton, while 354 or 15.9% were born somewhere else in Switzerland, and 644 or 29.0% were born outside of Switzerland.

In 2008 there were 19 live births to Swiss citizens and 10 births to non-Swiss citizens, and in same time span there were 21 deaths of Swiss citizens and 1 non-Swiss citizen death. Ignoring immigration and emigration, the population of Swiss citizens decreased by 2 while the foreign population increased by 9. There were 3 Swiss men and 10 Swiss women who immigrated back to Switzerland. At the same time, there were 22 non-Swiss men and 25 non-Swiss women who immigrated from another country to Switzerland. The total Swiss population change in 2008 (from all sources, including moves across municipal borders) was an increase of 69 and the non-Swiss population decreased by 8 people. This represents a population growth rate of 2.7%.

The age distribution, as of 2009, in Lucens is; 256 children or 11.1% of the population are between 0 and 9 years old and 284 teenagers or 12.3% are between 10 and 19. Of the adult population, 284 people or 12.3% of the population are between 20 and 29 years old. 334 people or 14.4% are between 30 and 39, 371 people or 16.0% are between 40 and 49, and 275 people or 11.9% are between 50 and 59. The senior population distribution is 252 people or 10.9% of the population are between 60 and 69 years old, 158 people or 6.8% are between 70 and 79, there are 83 people or 3.6% who are between 80 and 89, and there are 19 people or 0.8% who are 90 and older.

As of 2000, there were 880 people who were single and never married in the municipality. There were 1,073 married individuals, 148 widows or widowers and 120 individuals who are divorced.

As of 2000, there were 913 private households in the municipality, and an average of 2.3 persons per household. There were 312 households that consist of only one person and 69 households with five or more people. Out of a total of 939 households that answered this question, 33.2% were households made up of just one person and there were 7 adults who lived with their parents. Of the rest of the households, there are 244 married couples without children, 301 married couples with children. There were 37 single parents with a child or children. There were 12 households that were made up of unrelated people and 26 households that were made up of some sort of institution or another collective housing.

In 2000 there were 217 single family homes (or 50.2% of the total) out of a total of 432 inhabited buildings. There were 109 multi-family buildings (25.2%), along with 58 multi-purpose buildings that were mostly used for housing (13.4%) and 48 other use buildings (commercial or industrial) that also had some housing (11.1%). Of the single family homes 46 were built before 1919, while 12 were built between 1990 and 2000. The most multi-family homes (42) were built before 1919 and the next most (18) were built between 1961 and 1970. There was 1 multi-family house built between 1996 and 2000.

In 2000 there were 1,078 apartments in the municipality. The most common apartment size was 3 rooms of which there were 328. There were 94 single room apartments and 198 apartments with five or more rooms. Of these apartments, a total of 886 apartments (82.2% of the total) were permanently occupied, while 124 apartments (11.5%) were seasonally occupied and 68 apartments (6.3%) were empty. As of 2009, the construction rate of new housing units was 1.3 new units per 1000 residents. The vacancy rate for the municipality, in 2010, was 0%.

The historical population is given in the following chart:

== Heritage sites of national significance ==
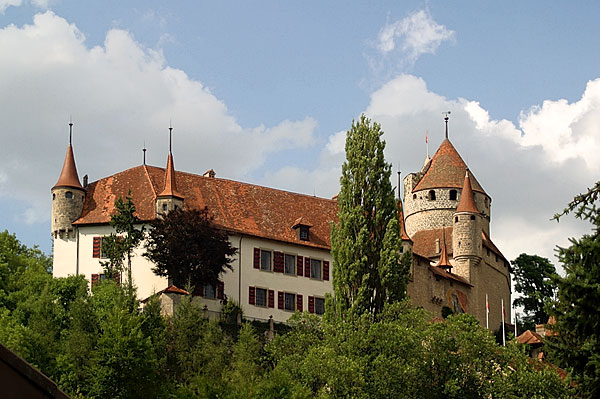
Lucens Castle

Lucens Castle is listed as a Swiss heritage site of national significance. The entire town of Lucens is part of the Inventory of Swiss Heritage Sites.

== Politics ==
In the 2015 federal election the most popular party was the SVP with 29.8% of the vote. The next three most popular parties were the SP (25.6%), the FDP (22.4%) and the GPS (9.5%). In the federal election, a total of 542 votes were cast, and the voter turnout was 34.6%.

In the 2007 federal election the most popular party was the SVP which received 29.38% of the vote. The next three most popular parties were the SP (26.59%), the FDP (20.05%) and the Green Party (8.56%). In the federal election, a total of 494 votes were cast, and the voter turnout was 41.2%.

== Economy ==
Lucens is an industrial community, or a municipality where manufacturing provides over a quarter of all jobs.

As of 2014, there were a total of 1,176 people employed in the municipality. Of these, a total of 23 people worked in 10 businesses in the primary economic sector. The secondary sector employed 620 workers in 47 separate businesses. A minority (19.5%) of the secondary sector employees worked in very small businesses. There were 7 small businesses with a total of 185 employees and 3 mid sized businesses with a total of 314 employees. Finally, the tertiary sector provided 533 jobs in 123 businesses. There were 4 small businesses with a total of 142 employees and one mid sized business with a total of 92 employees. In 2014 a total of 10.7% of the population received social assistance.

In 2008 the total number of full-time equivalent jobs was 791. The number of jobs in the primary sector was 7, all of which were in agriculture. The number of jobs in the secondary sector was 530 of which 361 or (68.1%) were in manufacturing and 153 (28.9%) were in construction. The number of jobs in the tertiary sector was 254. In the tertiary sector; 70 or 27.6% were in wholesale or retail sales or the repair of motor vehicles, 24 or 9.4% were in the movement and storage of goods, 32 or 12.6% were in a hotel or restaurant, 5 or 2.0% were the insurance or financial industry, 16 or 6.3% were technical professionals or scientists, 35 or 13.8% were in education and 48 or 18.9% were in health care.

In 2000, there were 464 workers who commuted into the municipality and 609 workers who commuted away. The municipality is a net exporter of workers, with about 1.3 workers leaving the municipality for every one entering. Of the working population, 7.6% used public transportation to get to work, and 64.8% used a private car.

== Religion ==
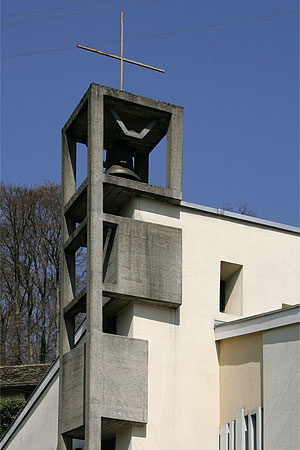
Catholic Church in Lucens

From the 2000 census, 859 or 38.7% were Roman Catholic, while 802 or 36.1% belonged to the Swiss Reformed Church. Of the rest of the population, there were 8 members of an Orthodox church (or about 0.36% of the population), there were 9 individuals (or about 0.41% of the population) who belonged to the Christian Catholic Church, and there were 61 individuals (or about 2.75% of the population) who belonged to another Christian church. There was 1 individual who was Jewish, and 199 (or about 8.96% of the population) who were Islamic. There were 2 individuals who were Buddhist and 2 individuals who belonged to another church. 126 (or about 5.67% of the population) belonged to no church, are agnostic or atheist, and 152 individuals (or about 6.84% of the population) did not answer the question.

== Education ==
In Lucens about 705 or (31.7%) of the population have completed non-mandatory upper secondary education, and 148 or (6.7%) have completed additional higher education (either university or a Fachhochschule). Of the 148 who completed tertiary schooling, 57.4% were Swiss men, 21.6% were Swiss women, 13.5% were non-Swiss men and 7.4% were non-Swiss women.

In the 2009/2010 school year there were a total of 278 students in the Lucens school district. In the Vaud cantonal school system, two years of non-obligatory pre-school are provided by the political districts. During the school year, the political district provided pre-school care for a total of 155 children of which 83 children (53.5%) received subsidized pre-school care. The canton's primary school program requires students to attend for four years. There were 129 students in the municipal primary school program. The obligatory lower secondary school program lasts for six years and there were 139 students in those schools. There were also 10 students who were home schooled or attended another non-traditional school. Lucens is home to 1 museum, the Musée Sherlock Holmes. In 2009 the Musée Sherlock Holmes was visited by 1,359 visitors (the average in previous years was 1,373).

As of 2000, there were 134 students in Lucens who came from another municipality, while 61 residents attended schools outside the municipality.

== Transportation ==
The municipality has a railway station, Lucens, on the Palézieux–Lyss railway line. It has regular service to Lausanne, Palézieux, Payerne, and Kerzers.

== Crime ==
In 2014 the crime rate, of the over 200 crimes listed in the Swiss Criminal Code (running from murder, robbery and assault to accepting bribes and election fraud), in Lucens was 58.8 per thousand residents. This rate is only 61.3% of the cantonal rate and about the same as the national rate (64.6). During the same period, the rate of drug crimes was 2.5 per thousand residents. This rate is only 25.3% of the national rate. The rate of violations of immigration, visa and work permit laws was 1.3 per thousand residents. This rate is only 26.5% of the rate for the entire country.
