= Cheiry =

- Former municipality
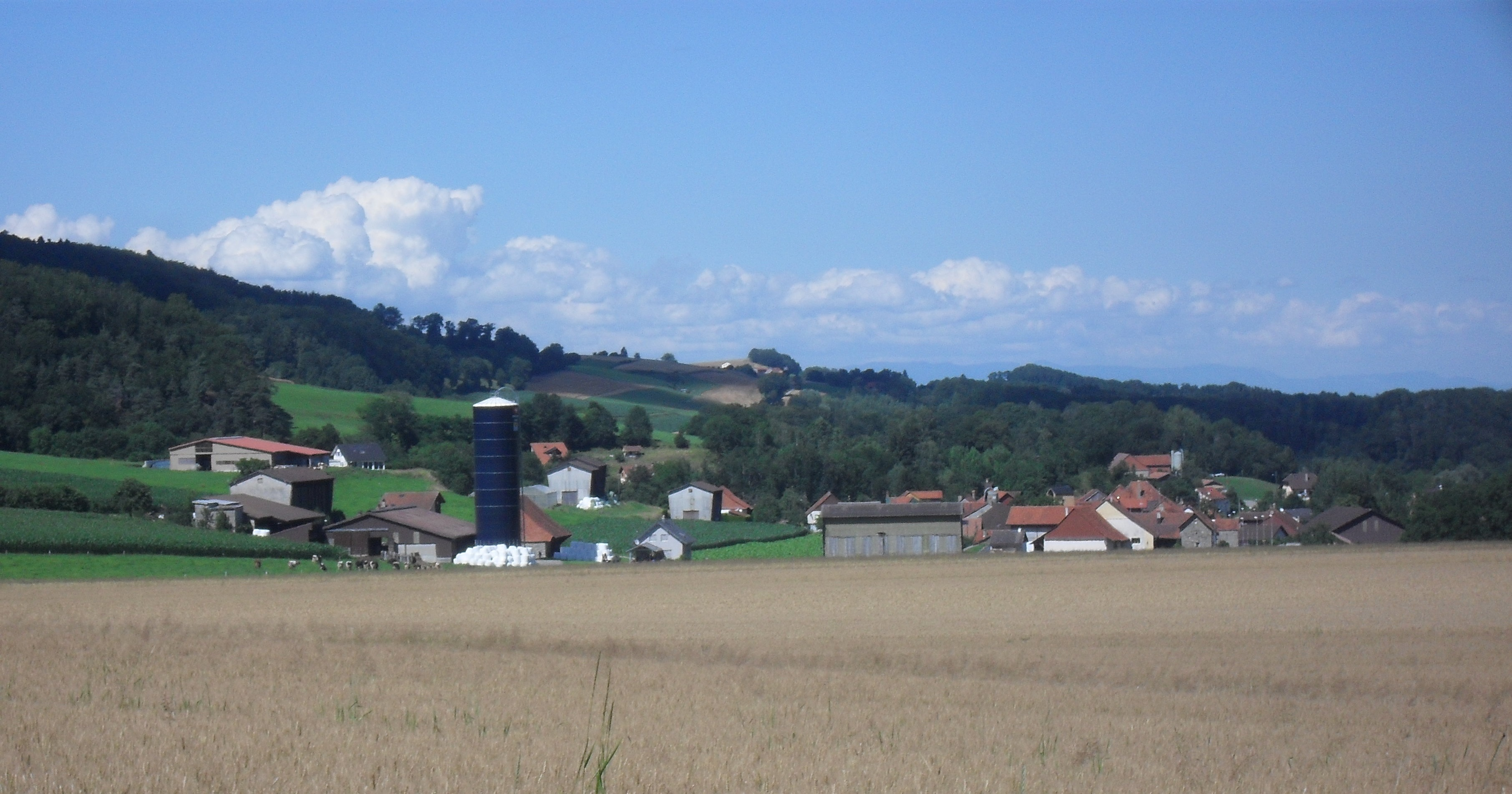

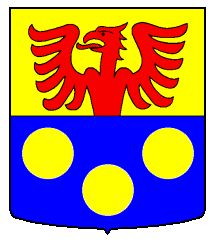
- Coat of arms
- Location of Cheiry
- Location within Switzerland Location within Canton of Fribourg
- Coordinates: 46°45′N 6°50′E
- Country: Switzerland
- Canton: Fribourg
- District: Broye

Government
  - Mayor: Syndic

Area
  - Total: 6.49 km^{2} (2.51 sq mi)
- Elevation: 563 m (1,847 ft)

Population (December 2019)
  - Total: 390
  - Density: 60/km^{2} (160/sq mi)
- Time zone: UTC+01:00 (CET)
  - Summer (DST): UTC+02:00 (CEST)
- Postal code: 1529
- SFOS number: 2009
- ISO 3166 code: CH-FR
- Localities: Cheiry, Chapelle, Coumin-Dessus, Coumin-Dessous
- Surrounded by: Combremont-le-Grand (VD), Combremont-le-Petit (VD), Forel-sur-Lucens (VD), Granges-près-Marnand (VD), Prévondavaux, Sassel (VD), Surpierre
- Website: SFSO statistics

Cheiry (French: [ʃeʁi]; Arpitan: Chêri, locally Tsèri [tsɛˈʁi]) is a former municipality in the district of Broye in the canton of Fribourg in Switzerland. In 2021 the municipality of Cheiry merged into the municipality of Surpierre.

== History ==
Cheiry is first mentioned around 1184-85 as Chirie, when the bishop of Lausanne Roger de Vico Pisano donated it and Surpierre's churches to the priory of Saint-Maire in Lausanne, confirmed by Pope Lucius III.

By 1228, Cheiry had become a parish church dedicated to St. Sylvester, which was probably the first parish church in Surpierre, before becoming a branch of the Notre-Dame des Champs church in Surpierre. In 1380, it was part of the Surpierre seigneury, and in 1536 was attached to the Fribourg bailliage of Surpierre. In 1624, the village burned to the ground. In 1798 it was then attached to Estavayer, and then again to Surpierre from 1803 to 1848. A sanctuary was built in 1967; Cheiry was traditionally an agricultural area and grew cereals, tobacco and raised livestock.

An early medieval necropolis was discovered on Cheiry's grounds. Starting in 1986, its land was reorganized. On 5 October 1994, 23 members of the Order of the Solar Temple were found in dead in the farm La Rochette in Cheiry in a mass murder-suicide. Its territory was enlarged in 2005 with the formerly independent municipality Chapelle. In 2021 the municipality of Cheiry merged into the municipality of Surpierre.

== Geography ==
Cheiry had an area, as of 2009, of 6.5 square kilometers (2.5 mi^{2}). Of this area, 4.25 km^{2} (1.64 mi^{2}) or 65.6% is used for agricultural purposes, while 1.76 km^{2} (0.68 mi^{2}) or 27.2% is forested. Of the rest of the land, 0.45 km^{2} (0.17 mi^{2}) or 6.9% is settled (buildings or roads) and 0.02 km^{2} (4.9 acres) or 0.3% is unproductive land.

Of the built up area, housing and buildings made up 2.5% and transportation infrastructure made up 3.4%. Out of the forested land, 24.4% of the total land area is heavily forested and 2.8% is covered with orchards or small clusters of trees. Of the agricultural land, 42.7% is used for growing crops and 22.4% is pastures. The former municipality is located in the Broye district, in the Surpierre exclave.

== Coat of arms ==
The blazon of the municipal coat of arms is Per fess, Or a Semi-Eagle displayed issuant Gules, and Azure three Plates.

== Demographics ==
Cheiry had a population (as of 2019) of 390. As of 2008, 2.9% of the population are resident foreign nationals. Over the last 10 years (2000–2010) the population has changed at a rate of 4.6%. Migration accounted for 8.9%, while births and deaths accounted for -0.9%.

Most of the population (as of 2000) speaks French (244 or 91.4%) as their first language, German is the second most common (11 or 4.1%) and English is the third (5 or 1.9%).

As of 2008, the population was 51.1% male and 48.9% female. The population was made up of 179 Swiss men (49.2% of the population) and 7 (1.9%) non-Swiss men. There were 172 Swiss women (47.3%) and 6 (1.6%) non-Swiss women. Of the population in the municipality, 106 or about 39.7% were born in Cheiry and lived there in 2000. There were 52 or 19.5% who were born in the same canton, while 77 or 28.8% were born somewhere else in Switzerland, and 24 or 9.0% were born outside of Switzerland.

The age distribution, as of 2000, in Cheiry was; 42 children or 12.7% of the population are between 0 and 9 years old and 55 teenagers or 16.6% are between 10 and 19. Of the adult population, 31 people or 9.4% of the population are between 20 and 29 years old. 54 people or 16.3% are between 30 and 39, 53 people or 16.0% are between 40 and 49, and 27 people or 8.2% are between 50 and 59. The senior population distribution is 26 people or 7.9% of the population are between 60 and 69 years old, 30 people or 9.1% are between 70 and 79, there are 11 people or 3.3% who are between 80 and 89, and there are 2 people or 0.6% who are 90 and older.

As of 2000, there were 106 people who were single and never married in the municipality. There were 137 married individuals, 16 widows or widowers and 8 individuals who are divorced.

As of 2000, there were 119 private households in the municipality, and an average of 2.7 persons per household. There were 22 households that consist of only one person and 7 households with five or more people. In 2000, a total of 94 apartments (87.9% of the total) were permanently occupied, while 8 apartments (7.5%) were seasonally occupied and 5 apartments (4.7%) were empty.

From the 2000 census, 189 or 70.8% were Roman Catholic, while 49 or 18.4% belonged to the Swiss Reformed Church. Of the rest of the population, there were 3 members of an Orthodox church (or about 1.12% of the population). There were 4 (or about 1.50% of the population) who were Islamic. There were 3 individuals who were Buddhist and 1 individual who belonged to another church. 14 (or about 5.24% of the population) belonged to no church, are agnostic or atheist, and 4 individuals (or about 1.50% of the population) did not answer the question.

The historical population is given in the following chart:

== Heritage sites of national significance ==
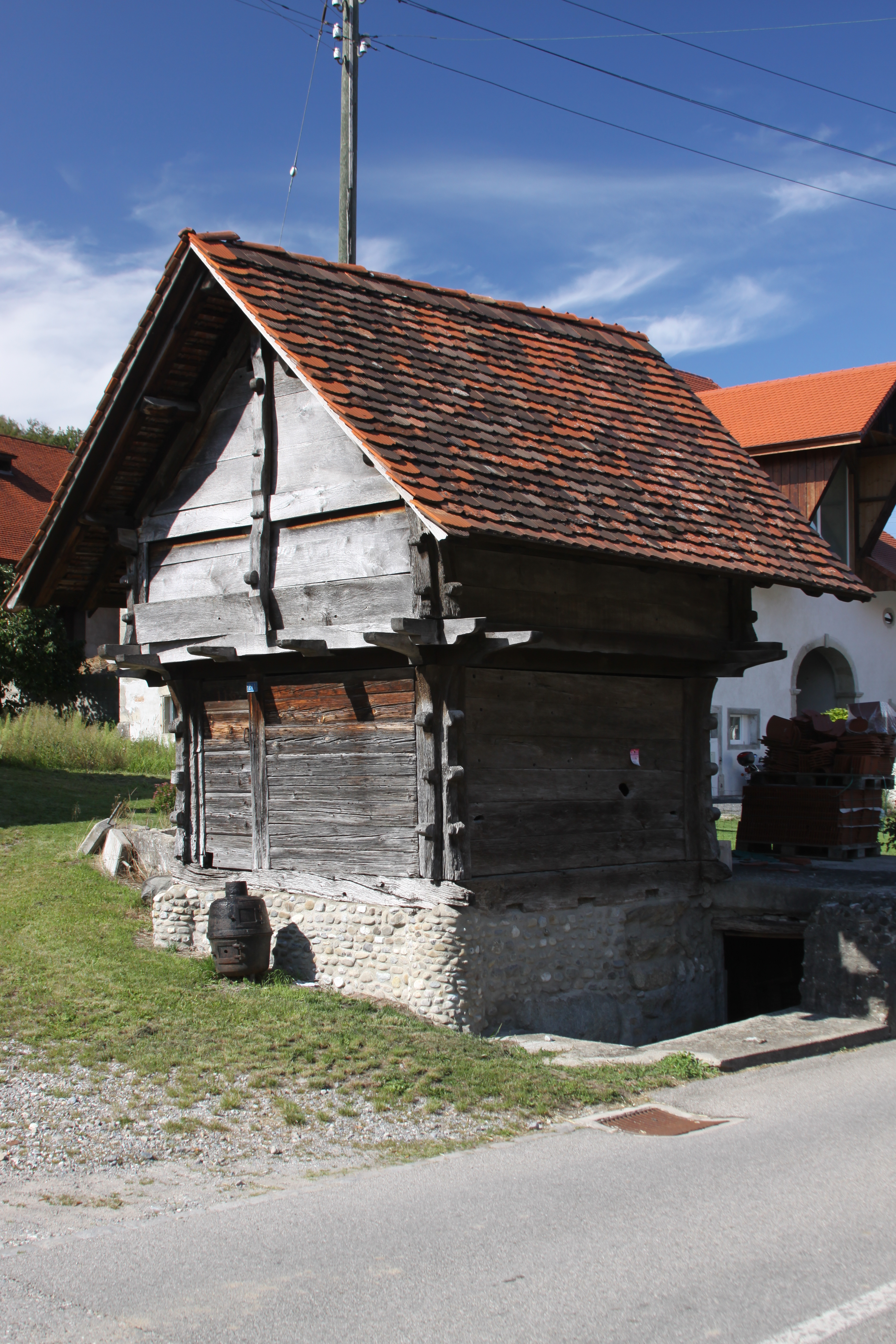
Granary

The Granary at Route Du Centre 21 A is listed as a Swiss heritage site of national significance.

== Politics ==
In the 2011 federal election the most popular party was the SVP which received 32.8% of the vote. The next three most popular parties were the CVP (31.4%), the SP (22.7%) and the FDP (6.9%).

The SVP received about the same percentage of the vote as they did in the 2007 Federal election (31.9% in 2007 vs 32.8% in 2011). The CVP increased in popularity (26.0% in 2007), the SPS increased in popularity (15.8% in 2007) and the FDP increased in popularity (14.8% in 2007). A total of 120 votes were cast in this election, of which 1 or 0.8% was invalid.

== Economy ==
As of 2010, Cheiry had an unemployment rate of 2.1%. As of 2008, there were 51 people employed in the primary economic sector and about 16 businesses involved in this sector. 7 people were employed in the secondary sector and there was 1 business in this sector. 19 people were employed in the tertiary sector, with 8 businesses in this sector. There were 125 residents of the municipality who were employed in some capacity, of which females made up 44.0% of the workforce.

In 2008 the total number of full-time equivalent jobs was 52. The number of jobs in the primary sector was 31, all of which were in agriculture. The number of jobs in the secondary sector was 6, all of which were in construction. The number of jobs in the tertiary sector was 15. In the tertiary sector; 2 or 13.3% were in wholesale or retail sales or the repair of motor vehicles, 6 or 40.0% were in the movement and storage of goods, 3 or 20.0% were in a hotel or restaurant, 1 was in the information industry, 2 or 13.3% were in education.

In 2000, there were 10 workers who commuted into the municipality and 87 workers who commuted away. The municipality is a net exporter of workers, with about 8.7 workers leaving the municipality for every one entering. Of the working population, 1.3% used public transportation to get to work, and 61.4% used a private car.

== Education ==
In Cheiry about 88 or (33.0%) of the population have completed non-mandatory upper secondary education, and 13 or (4.9%) have completed additional higher education (either university or a Fachhochschule). Of the 13 who completed tertiary schooling, 53.8% were Swiss men, 38.5% were Swiss women.

The Canton of Fribourg school system provides one year of non-obligatory Kindergarten, followed by six years of Primary school. This is followed by three years of obligatory lower Secondary school where the students are separated according to ability and aptitude. Following the lower Secondary students may attend a three or four year optional upper Secondary school. The upper Secondary school is divided into gymnasium (university preparatory) and vocational programs. After they finish the upper Secondary program, students may choose to attend a Tertiary school or continue their apprenticeship.

During the 2010–11 school year, there were a total of 43 students attending 2 classes in Cheiry. A total of 52 students from the municipality attended any school, either in the municipality or outside of it. There was one kindergarten class with a total of 19 students in the municipality. There was one primary class with a total of 24 students. There were no lower secondary classes in the municipality, but 11 students attended lower secondary school in a neighboring municipality. There were no upper Secondary classes or vocational classes, but there was one upper Secondary student and 6 upper Secondary vocational students who attended classes in another municipality. There were no non-university Tertiary classes, but there was one specialized Tertiary student who attended classes in another municipality.

As of 2000, there were 6 students in Cheiry who came from another municipality, while 28 residents attended schools outside the municipality.
