= Bussy-sur-Moudon =

- Municipality
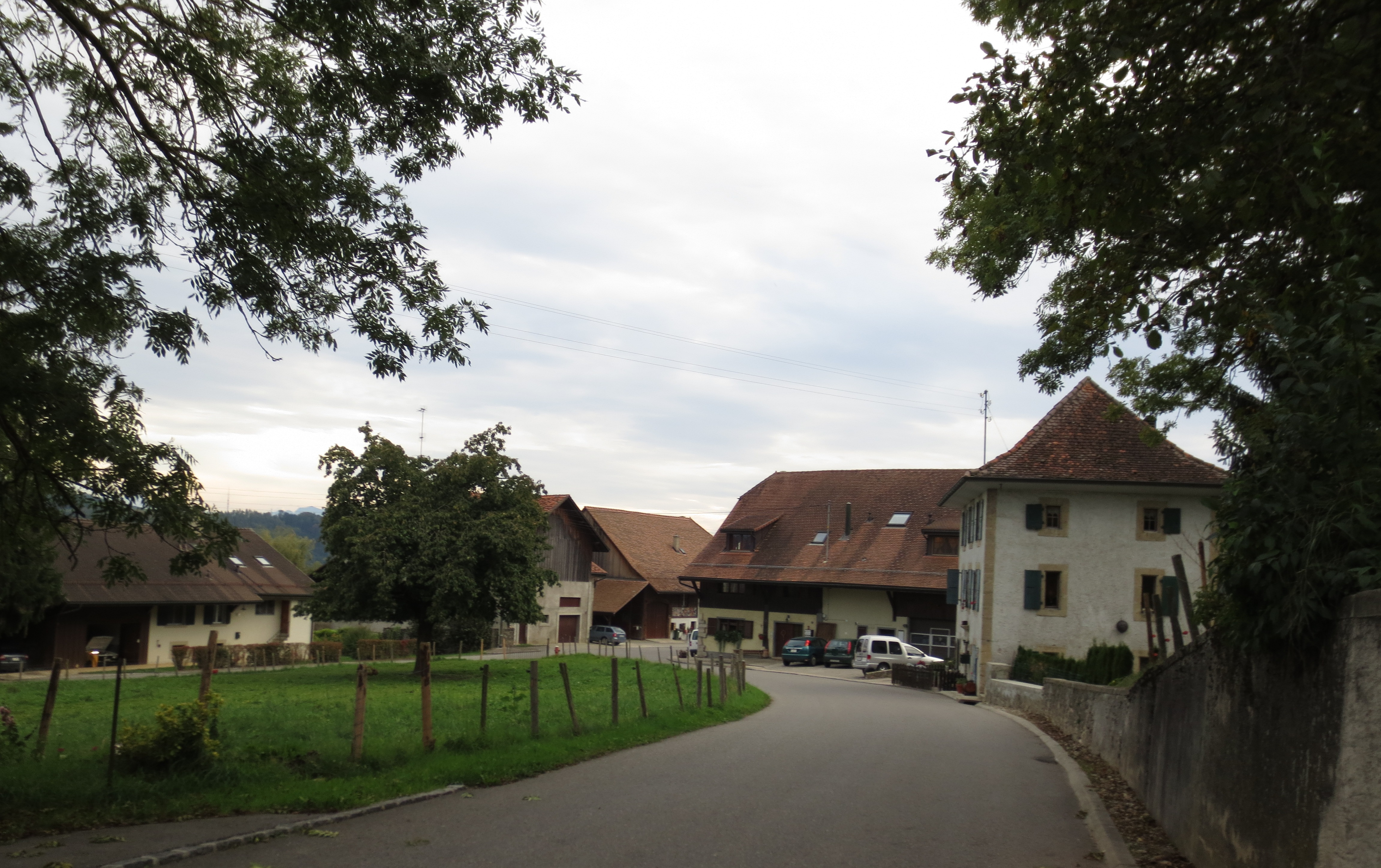

- Flag Coat of arms
- Location of Bussy-sur-Moudon
- Location within Switzerland Location within Canton of Vaud
- Coordinates: 46°41′N 6°49′E
- Country: Switzerland
- Canton: Vaud
- District: Broye-Vully

Government
  - Mayor: Syndic

Area
  - Total: 3.09 km^{2} (1.19 sq mi)
- Elevation: 628 m (2,060 ft)

Population (2003)
  - Total: 191
  - Density: 61.8/km^{2} (160/sq mi)
- Time zone: UTC+01:00 (CET)
  - Summer (DST): UTC+02:00 (CEST)
- Postal code: 1514
- SFOS number: 5663
- ISO 3166 code: CH-VD
- Surrounded by: Lucens, Moudon, Neyruz-sur-Moudon, Oulens-sur-Lucens
- Website: http://www.bussy-sur-moudon.ch/

Bussy-sur-Moudon (Arpitan: Bussê) is a municipality in the district Broye-Vully in the canton of Vaud in Switzerland.

== History ==
Bussy-sur-Moudon is first mentioned in the 12th Century as Buxi.

== Geography ==
Aerial view (1964)

Bussy-sur-Moudon has an area, as of 2009, of 3.09 square kilometers (1.19 sq mi). Of this area, 2.17 km^{2} (0.84 sq mi) or 70.2% is used for agricultural purposes, while 0.69 km^{2} (0.27 sq mi) or 22.3% is forested. Of the rest of the land, 0.23 km^{2} (0.089 sq mi) or 7.4% is settled (buildings or roads).

Of the built up area, housing and buildings made up 1.9% and transportation infrastructure made up 4.5%. Out of the forested land, 20.4% of the total land area is heavily forested and 1.9% is covered with orchards or small clusters of trees. Of the agricultural land, 56.3% is used for growing crops and 12.9% is pastures.

The municipality was part of the Moudon District until it was dissolved on 31 August 2006, and Bussy-sur-Moudon became part of the new district of Broye-Vully. The municipality is located in the western portion of the upper Broye valley.

== Coat of arms ==
The blazon of the municipal coat of arms is Paly of six Or and Gules, on a bar Argent a cauldron Sable; in chief Gules a cross Argent.

== Demographics ==
Bussy-sur-Moudon has a population (as of December 2020) of 218. As of 2008, 7.4% of the population are resident foreign nationals. Over the last 10 years (1999–2009) the population has changed at a rate of 1.1%. It has changed at a rate of 2.2% due to migration and at a rate of 0% due to births and deaths.

Most of the population (as of 2000) speaks French (174 or 93.5%), with German being second most common (4 or 2.2%) and Portuguese being third (3 or 1.6%). There is 1 person who speaks Italian.

Of the population in the municipality 65 or about 34.9% were born in Bussy-sur-Moudon and lived there in 2000. There were 75 or 40.3% who were born in the same canton, while 27 or 14.5% were born somewhere else in Switzerland, and 17 or 9.1% were born outside of Switzerland.

In 2008 there were 2 live births to Swiss citizens and were 2 deaths of Swiss citizens. Ignoring immigration and emigration, the population of Swiss citizens remained the same while the foreign population remained the same. There was 1 non-Swiss man who immigrated from another country to Switzerland. The total Swiss population change in 2008 (from all sources, including moves across municipal borders) was an increase of 1 and the non-Swiss population increased by 8 people. This represents a population growth rate of 5.0%.

The age distribution, as of 2009, in Bussy-sur-Moudon is; 10 children or 5.5% of the population are between 0 and 9 years old and 25 teenagers or 13.7% are between 10 and 19. Of the adult population, 15 people or 8.2% of the population are between 20 and 29 years old. 24 people or 13.2% are between 30 and 39, 29 people or 15.9% are between 40 and 49, and 28 people or 15.4% are between 50 and 59. The senior population distribution is 27 people or 14.8% of the population are between 60 and 69 years old, 11 people or 6.0% are between 70 and 79, there are 12 people or 6.6% who are 80 and 89, and there is 1 person who is 90 and older.

As of 2000, there were 81 people who were single and never married in the municipality. There were 79 married individuals, 17 widows or widowers and 9 individuals who are divorced.

As of 2000, there were 79 private households in the municipality, and an average of 2.3 persons per household. There were 27 households that consist of only one person and 7 households with five or more people. Out of a total of 80 households that answered this question, 33.8% were households made up of just one person and there was 1 adult who lived with their parents. Of the rest of the households, there are 19 married couples without children, 27 married couples with children. There were 3 single parents with a child or children. There were 2 households that were made up of unrelated people and 1 household that was made up of some sort of institution or another collective housing.

In 2000 there were 32 single family homes (or 55.2% of the total) out of a total of 58 inhabited buildings. There were 11 multi-family buildings (19.0%), along with 14 multi-purpose buildings that were mostly used for housing (24.1%) and 1 other use buildings (commercial or industrial) that also had some housing (1.7%). Of the single family homes 12 were built before 1919, while 5 were built between 1990 and 2000. The most multi-family homes (4) were built before 1919 and the next most (3) were built between 1971 and 1980.

In 2000 there were 77 apartments in the municipality. The most common apartment size was 4 rooms of which there were 25. There were 3 single room apartments and 28 apartments with five or more rooms. Of these apartments, a total of 72 apartments (93.5% of the total) were permanently occupied, while 5 apartments (6.5%) were seasonally occupied. As of 2009, the construction rate of new housing units was 0 new units per 1000 residents. The vacancy rate for the municipality, in 2010, was 0%.

The historical population is given in the following chart:

== Politics ==
In the 2007 federal election the most popular party was the SVP which received 34.59% of the vote. The next three most popular parties were the FDP (24.26%), the SP (16.62%) and the Green Party (14.91%). In the federal election, a total of 66 votes were cast, and the voter turnout was 43.7%.

== Economy ==
As of 2010, Bussy-sur-Moudon had an unemployment rate of 0.4%. As of 2008, there were 20 people employed in the primary economic sector and about 9 businesses involved in this sector. 19 people were employed in the secondary sector and there were 7 businesses in this sector. 3 people were employed in the tertiary sector, with 2 businesses in this sector. There were 100 residents of the municipality who were employed in some capacity, of which females made up 44.0% of the workforce.

In 2008 the total number of full-time equivalent jobs was 33. The number of jobs in the primary sector was 14, all of which were in agriculture. The number of jobs in the secondary sector was 17 of which 12 or (70.6%) were in manufacturing and 5 (29.4%) were in construction. The number of jobs in the tertiary sector was 2, of which 1 was in the sale or repair of motor vehicles.

In 2000, there were 7 workers who commuted into the municipality and 66 workers who commuted away. The municipality is a net exporter of workers, with about 9.4 workers leaving the municipality for every one entering. Of the working population, 8% used public transportation to get to work, and 59% used a private car.

== Religion ==
From the 2000 census, 33 or 17.7% were Roman Catholic, while 138 or 74.2% belonged to the Swiss Reformed Church. Of the rest of the population, and there were 2 individuals (or about 1.08% of the population) who belonged to another Christian church. There was 1 individual who was Islamic. 8 (or about 4.30% of the population) belonged to no church, are agnostic or atheist, and 4 individuals (or about 2.15% of the population) did not answer the question.

== Education ==
In Bussy-sur-Moudon about 88 or (47.3%) of the population have completed non-mandatory upper secondary education, and 19 or (10.2%) have completed additional higher education (either university or a Fachhochschule). Of the 19 who completed tertiary schooling, 26.3% were Swiss men, 63.2% were Swiss women.

In the 2009/2010 school year there were a total of 15 students in the Bussy-sur-Moudon school district. In the Vaud cantonal school system, two years of non-obligatory pre-school are provided by the political districts. During the school year, the political district provided pre-school care for a total of 155 children of which 83 children (53.5%) received subsidized pre-school care. The canton's primary school program requires students to attend for four years. There were 8 students in the municipal primary school program. The obligatory lower secondary school program lasts for six years and there were 7 students in those schools.

As of 2000, there was one student in Bussy-sur-Moudon who came from another municipality, while 30 residents attended schools outside the municipality.
