= Surpierre =

- Municipality
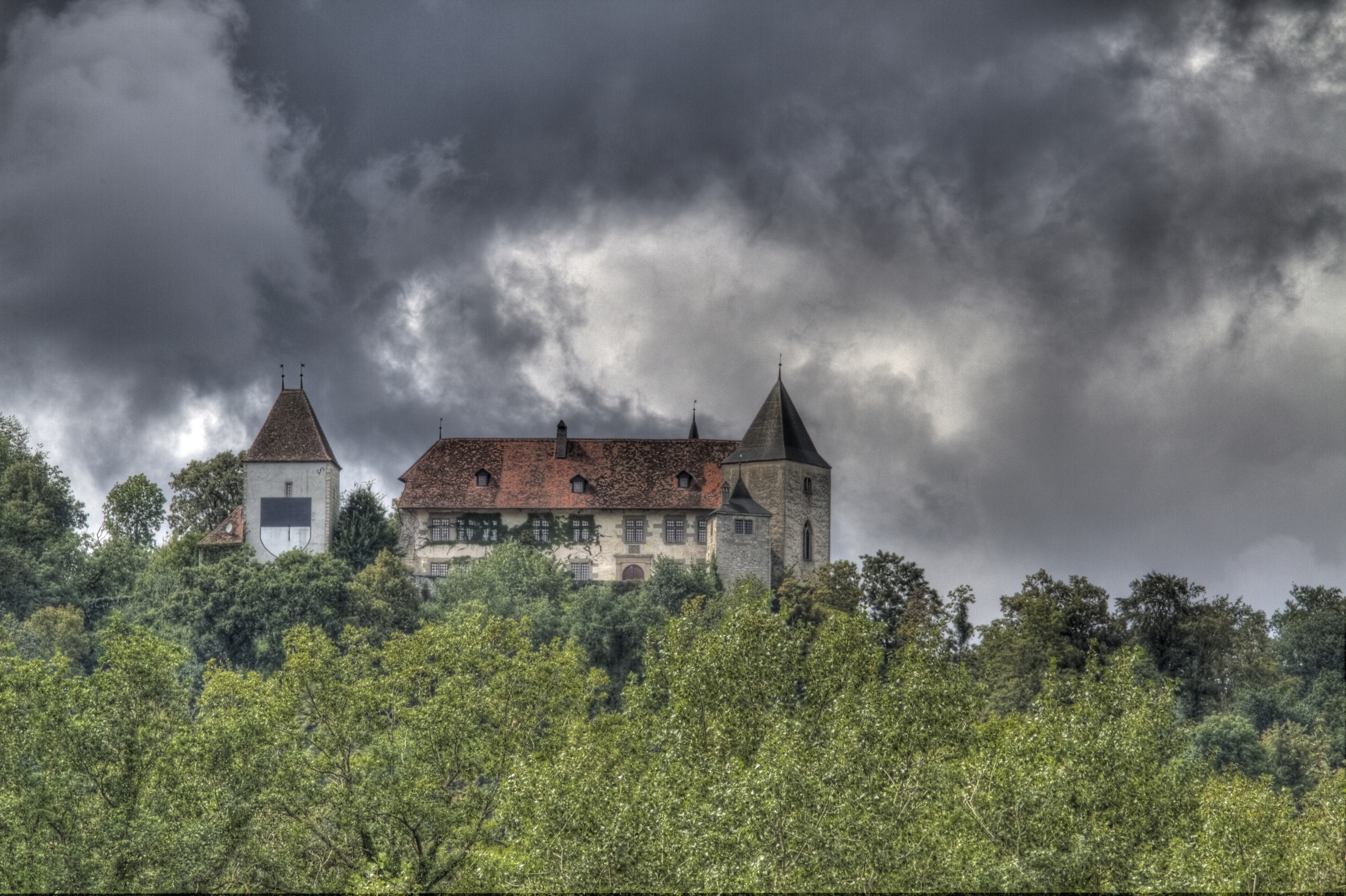
- Bailiff's Castle above Surpierre village

- Flag Coat of arms
- Location of Surpierre
- Location within Switzerland Location within Canton of Fribourg
- Coordinates: 46°45′N 6°52′E
- Country: Switzerland
- Canton: Fribourg
- District: Broye

Government
  - Mayor: Syndic

Area
  - Total: 4.77 km^{2} (1.84 sq mi)
- Elevation: 618 m (2,028 ft)

Population (Dec 2015)
  - Total: 704
  - Density: 148/km^{2} (382/sq mi)
- Time zone: UTC+01:00 (CET)
  - Summer (DST): UTC+02:00 (CEST)
- Postal code: 1528
- SFOS number: 2044
- ISO 3166 code: CH-FR
- Surrounded by: Cheiry, Cremin (VD), Forel-sur-Lucens (VD), Granges-près-Marnand (VD), Lucens (VD), Villeneuve
- Website: surpierre-fr.ch

Surpierre (Arpitan: Surpiérra, locally Chupyêra, pronounced [syˈpjeʁa] or [ʃyˈpjeʁa]) is a municipality in the district of Broye, in the canton of Fribourg, Switzerland. In January 2005 Surpierre incorporated the formerly independent municipality of Praratoud, in January 2017 Surpierre incorporated Villeneuve and in January 2021 it incorporated Cheiry.

== History ==
Surpierre is first mentioned in 1142 as Super Petram.

=== Cheiry ===
Cheiry is first mentioned around 1184–85 as Chirie. Its territory was enlarged in 2005 with the formerly independent municipality Chapelle.

== Geography ==
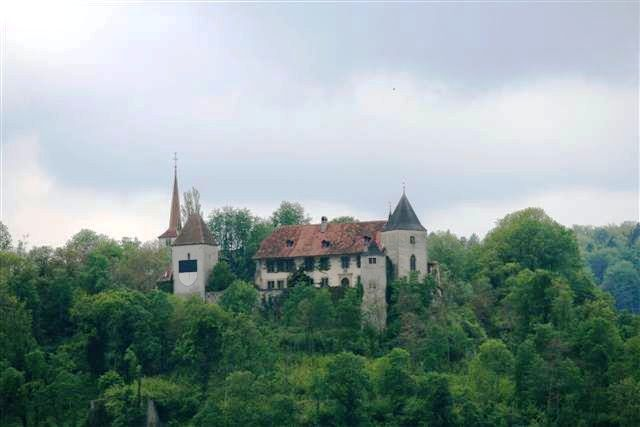
Bailiff's Castle above Surpierre village

Aerial view (1963)

After the 2017 merger Surpierre had an area of 14.8 km^{2} (5.71 sq mi).

Before the merger Surpierre had an area, (as of the 2004/09 survey) of 4.77 square kilometers (1.84 sq mi). Of this area, about 57.4% is used for agricultural purposes, while 37.9% is forested. Of the rest of the land, 4.6% is settled (buildings or roads). In the 2013/18 survey a total of 15 ha (37 acres) or about 3.1% of the total area was covered with buildings, an increase of 5 ha (12 acres) over the 1981 amount. Over the same time period, the amount of recreational space in the municipality decreased by 0 ha (0 acres) and is now about 0.00% of the total area. Of the agricultural land, 3 ha (7.4 acres) is used for orchards and vineyards, 276 ha (680 acres) is fields and grasslands and 0 ha (0 acres) consists of alpine grazing areas. Since 1981 the amount of agricultural land has decreased by 5 ha (12 acres). Over the same time period the amount of forested land has decreased by 0 ha (0 acres). Rivers and lakes cover 0 ha (0 acres) in the municipality.

The municipality is located in the Broye district, in an exclave in the canton of Vaud. The village is on a cliff overlooking the Broye valley. It consists of the villages of Surpierre and Praratoud.

== Coat of arms ==
The blazon of the municipal coat of arms is Azure, three Plates.

== Demographics ==
Surpierre has a population (as of December 2020) of 747. As of 2008, 5.1% of the population are resident foreign nationals. Over the last 10 years (2000–2010) the population has changed at a rate of 4.8%. Migration accounted for 13.6%, while births and deaths accounted for -0.7%.

Most of the population (as of 2000) speaks French (222 or 93.3%) as their first language, German is the second most common (11 or 4.6%) and Portuguese is the third (3 or 1.3%). There is 1 person who speaks Italian.

As of 2008, the population was 48.5% male and 51.5% female. The population was made up of 140 Swiss men (45.3% of the population) and 10 (3.2%) non-Swiss men. There were 150 Swiss women (48.5%) and 9 (2.9%) non-Swiss women. Of the population in the municipality, 100 or about 42.0% were born in Surpierre and lived there in 2000. There were 58 or 24.4% who were born in the same canton, while 59 or 24.8% were born somewhere else in Switzerland, and 16 or 6.7% were born outside of Switzerland.

The age distribution, as of 2000, in Surpierre is; 43 children or 14.3% of the population are between 0 and 9 years old and 45 teenagers or 15.0% are between 10 and 19. Of the adult population, 27 people or 9.0% of the population are between 20 and 29 years old. 51 people or 16.9% are between 30 and 39, 49 people or 16.3% are between 40 and 49, and 28 people or 9.3% are between 50 and 59. The senior population distribution is 21 people or 7.0% of the population are between 60 and 69 years old, 29 people or 9.6% are between 70 and 79, there are 8 people or 2.7% who are between 80 and 89.

As of 2000, there were 100 people who were single and never married in the municipality. There were 112 married individuals, 16 widows or widowers and 10 individuals who are divorced.

As of 2000, there were 108 private households in the municipality, and an average of 2.8 persons per household. There were 17 households that consist of only one person and 10 households with five or more people. In 2000, a total of 79 apartments (83.2% of the total) were permanently occupied, while 7 apartments (7.4%) were seasonally occupied and 9 apartments (9.5%) were empty. As of 2009, the construction rate of new housing units was 6.5 new units per 1000 residents. The vacancy rate for the municipality, in 2010, was 0.77%.

The historical population is given in the following chart:

== Heritage sites of national significance ==
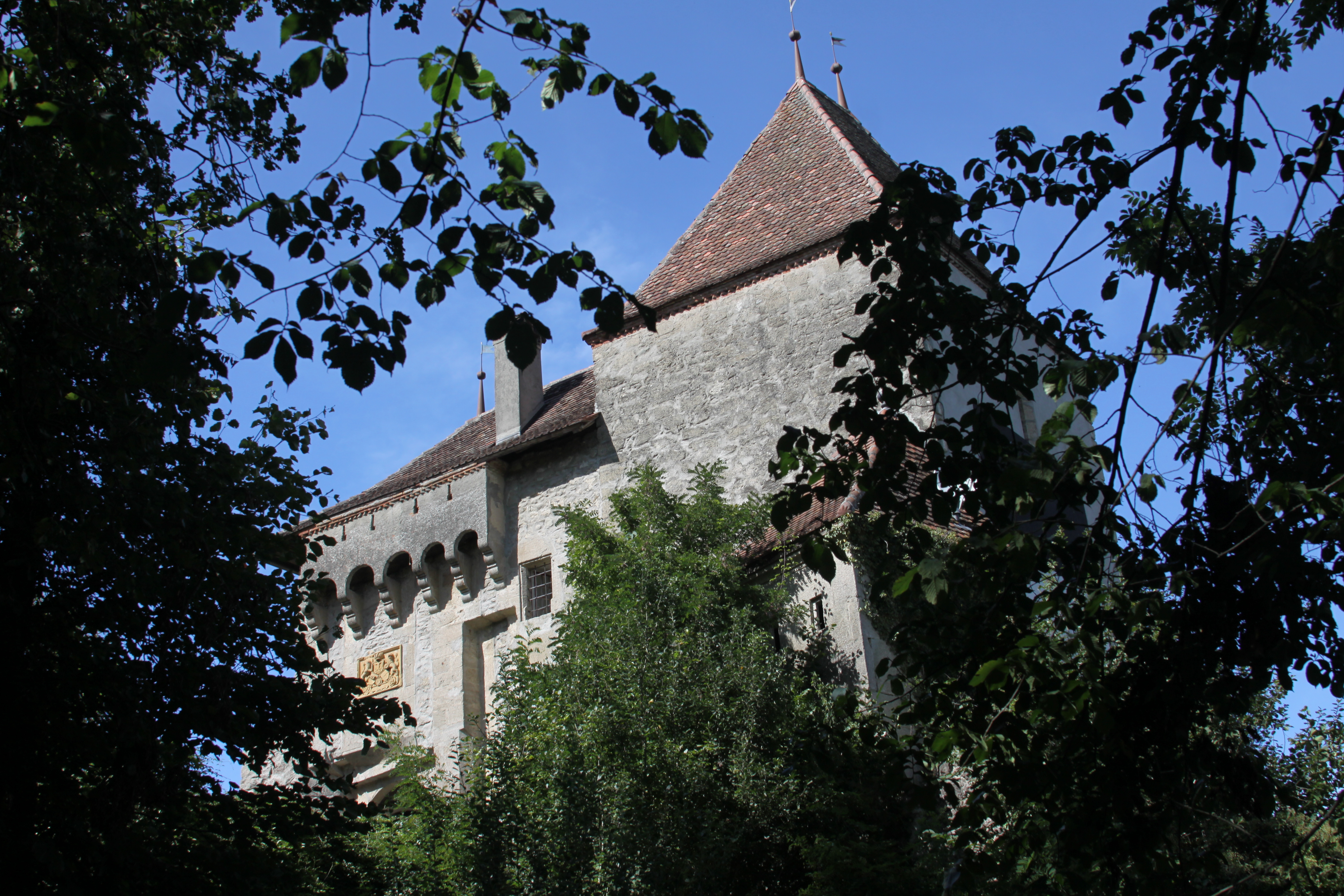
Château Baillival

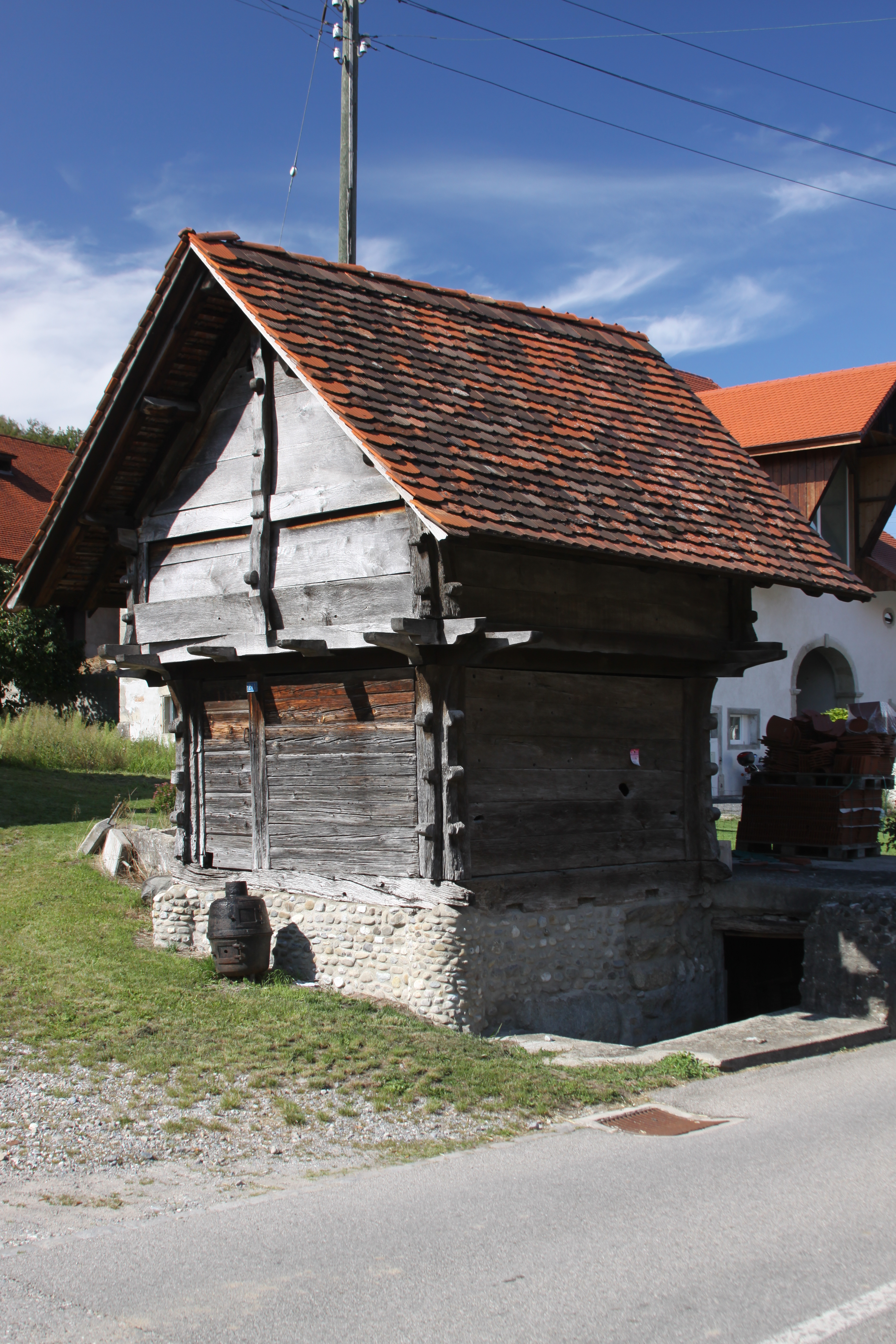
Granary

The Bailiff's Castle (Château Baillival) and the Granary at Route Du Centre 21 A are listed as Swiss heritage site of national significance.

== Economy ==
Surpierre is a mixed agro-industrial community, a municipality where agriculture and manufacturing play a significant role in the economy.

As of 2014, there were a total of 66 people employed in the municipality. Of these, a total of 17 people worked in 7 businesses in the primary economic sector. The secondary sector employed 25 workers in 4 separate businesses. Finally, the tertiary sector provided 24 jobs in 8 businesses.

In 2008 the total number of full-time equivalent jobs was 43. The number of jobs in the primary sector was 19, of which 12 were in agriculture and 7 were in forestry or lumber production. The number of jobs in the secondary sector was 20 of which 1 was in manufacturing and 19 (95.0%) were in construction. The number of jobs in the tertiary sector was 4. In the tertiary sector; 1 was in the movement and storage of goods, 2 or 50.0% were in education.

In 2000, there were 26 workers who commuted into the municipality and 73 workers who commuted away. The municipality is a net exporter of workers, with about 2.8 workers leaving the municipality for every one entering. Of the working population, 2.2% used public transportation to get to work, and 67.2% used a private car.

== Politics ==
In the 2015 federal election the most popular party was the SVP with 34.2% of the vote. The next three most popular parties were the SP (21.5%), the CVP (19.8%) and the FDP (12.3%). In the federal election, a total of 99 votes were cast, and the voter turnout was 40.6%. The 2015 election saw a large change in the voting when compared to 2011. The percentage of the vote received by the CVP increased from 12.7% in 2011 to 19.8% in 2015.

== Crime ==
In 2014 the crime rate, of the over 200 crimes listed in the Swiss Criminal Code (running from murder, robbery and assault to accepting bribes and election fraud), in Surpierre was 18.5 per thousand residents, or about 6 crimes that year. This rate is 28.6% of the average rate in the entire country. During the same period, the rate of drug crimes was 12.3 per thousand residents, which is a little higher than the national rate (9.9). The rate of violations of immigration, visa and work permit laws was 12.3 per thousand residents, which is one and a half times greater than the average rate in the entire country.

== Religion ==
From the 2000 census, 169 or 71.0% were Roman Catholic, while 31 or 13.0% belonged to the Swiss Reformed Church. Of the rest of the population, there were 5 individuals (or about 2.10% of the population) who belonged to the Christian Catholic Church, and there were 10 individuals (or about 4.20% of the population) who belonged to another Christian church. There was 1 person who was Buddhist. 19 (or about 7.98% of the population) belonged to no church, are agnostic or atheist, and 8 individuals (or about 3.36% of the population) did not answer the question.

== Education ==
In Surpierre about 72 or (30.3%) of the population have completed non-mandatory upper secondary education, and 14 or (5.9%) have completed additional higher education (either university or a Fachhochschule). Of the 14 who completed tertiary schooling, half were Swiss men and the other half were Swiss women.

The Canton of Fribourg school system provides one year of non-obligatory Kindergarten, followed by six years of Primary school. This is followed by three years of obligatory lower Secondary school where the students are separated according to ability and aptitude. Following the lower Secondary students may attend a three or four year optional upper Secondary school. The upper Secondary school is divided into gymnasium (university preparatory) and vocational programs. After they finish the upper Secondary program, students may choose to attend a Tertiary school or continue their apprenticeship.

During the 2010–11 school year, there were a total of 18 students attending one class in Surpierre. A total of 44 students from the municipality attended any school, either in the municipality or outside of it. There were no kindergarten classes in the municipality, but 10 students attended kindergarten in a neighboring municipality. The municipality had one primary class and 18 students. During the same year, there were no lower secondary classes in the municipality, but 13 students attended lower secondary school in a neighboring municipality. There were no upper Secondary classes or vocational classes, but there were 2 upper Secondary vocational students who attended classes in another municipality. The municipality had no non-university Tertiary classes, but there was one specialized Tertiary student who attended classes in another municipality.

As of 2000, there were 29 students in Surpierre who came from another municipality, while 26 residents attended schools outside the municipality.
