= Villeneuve, Fribourg =

Villeneuve
- Former municipality
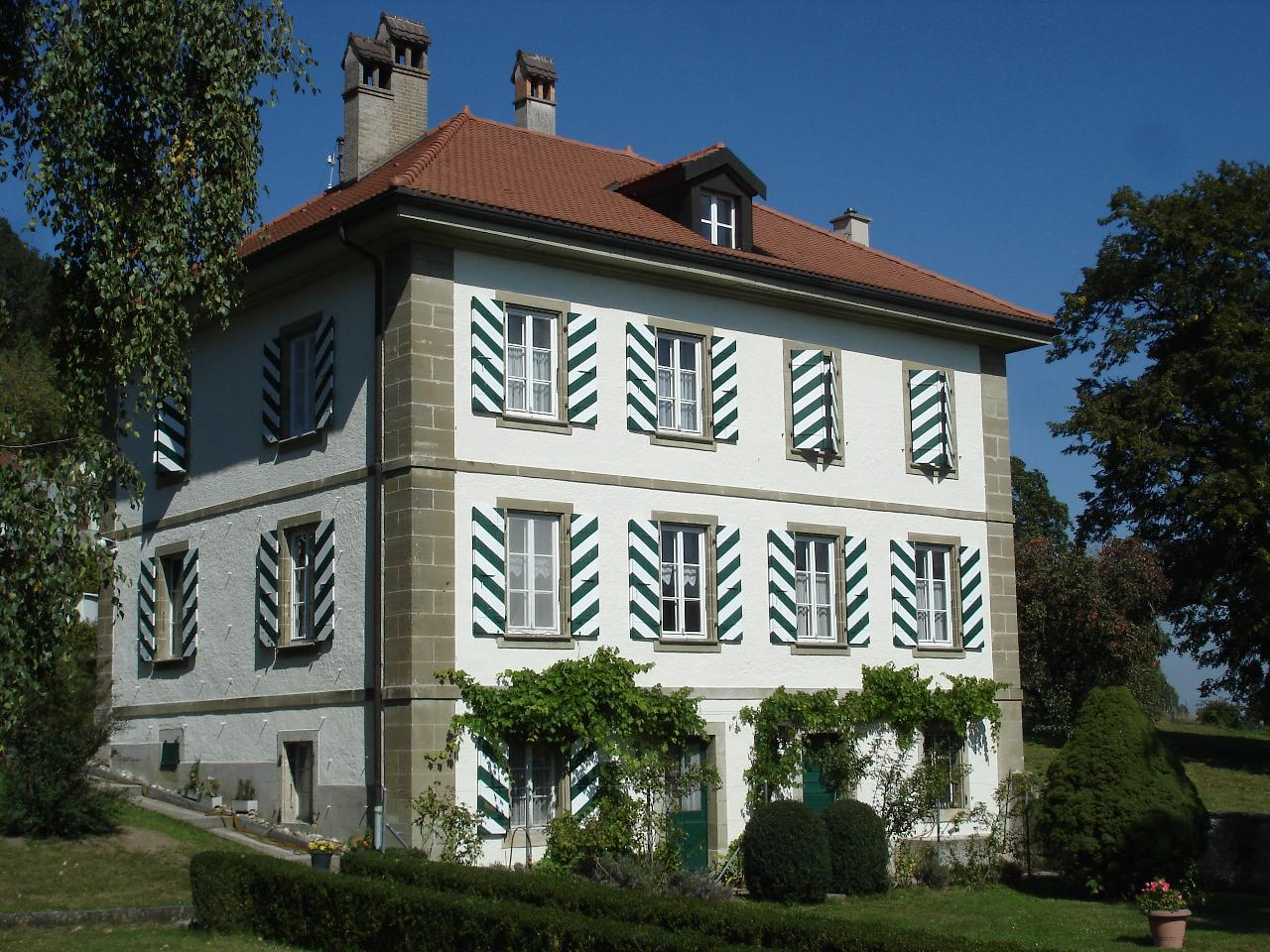
- Villa in Villeneuve village

- Coat of arms
- Location of Villeneuve
- Location within Switzerland Location within Canton of Fribourg
- Coordinates: 46°45′N 6°52′E
- Country: Switzerland
- Canton: Fribourg
- District: Broye

Government
  - Executive: Conseil communal with 5 members
  - Mayor: Syndic

Area
  - Total: 3.54 km^{2} (1.37 sq mi)
- Elevation: 481 m (1,578 ft)

Population (Dec 2015)
  - Total: 374
  - Density: 106/km^{2} (274/sq mi)
- Time zone: UTC+01:00 (CET)
  - Summer (DST): UTC+02:00 (CEST)
- Postal code: 1527
- SFOS number: 2047
- ISO 3166 code: CH-FR
- Surrounded by: Cremin (VD), Granges-près-Marnand (VD), Henniez (VD), Lucens (VD), Seigneux (VD), Surpierre
- Website: www.villeneuvefr.ch

Villeneuve (French pronunciation: [vilnœv]) is a former municipality in the district of Broye, in the canton of Fribourg, Switzerland.

The municipality of Villeneuve merged on 1 January 2017 into Surpierre.

== Geography ==
Villeneuve had an area, as of 2009, of 3.5 square kilometers (1.4 mi^{2}). Of this area, 2.02 km^{2} (0.78 mi^{2}) or 57.2% is used for agricultural purposes, while 1.21 km^{2} (0.47 mi^{2}) or 34.3% is forested. Of the rest of the land, 0.28 km^{2} (0.11 mi^{2}) or 7.9% is settled (buildings or roads), 0.04 km^{2} (9.9 acres) or 1.1% is either rivers or lakes and 0.02 km^{2} (4.9 acres) or 0.6% is unproductive land.

Of the built up area, housing and buildings made up 4.0% and transportation infrastructure made up 2.5%. Out of the forested land, 32.9% of the total land area is heavily forested and 1.4% is covered with orchards or small clusters of trees. Of the agricultural land, 47.6% is used for growing crops and 9.3% is pastures. All the water in the municipality is flowing water.

== Coat of arms ==
The blazon of the municipal coat of arms is Per fess, Azure three Plates and Or four Bends Gules.

== Demographics ==
Villeneuve had a population (as of 2015) of 374. As of 2008, 7.9% of the population are resident foreign nationals. Over the last 10 years (2000–2010) the population has changed at a rate of 4.5%. Migration accounted for 14.8%, while births and deaths accounted for -2.7%.

Most of the population (as of 2000) speaks French (237 or 91.5%) as their first language, German is the second most common (15 or 5.8%) and Italian is the third (3 or 1.2%). There is 1 person who speaks Romansh.

As of 2008, the population was 50.7% male and 49.3% female. The population was made up of 138 Swiss men (46.6% of the population) and 12 (4.1%) non-Swiss men. There were 133 Swiss women (44.9%) and 13 (4.4%) non-Swiss women. Of the population in the municipality, 119 or about 45.9% were born in Villeneuve and lived there in 2000. There were 43 or 16.6% who were born in the same canton, while 67 or 25.9% were born somewhere else in Switzerland, and 22 or 8.5% were born outside of Switzerland.

The age distribution, as of 2000, in Villeneuve is; 38 children or 14.7% of the population are between 0 and 9 years old and 30 teenagers or 11.6% are between 10 and 19. Of the adult population, 25 people or 9.7% of the population are between 20 and 29 years old. 43 people or 16.6% are between 30 and 39, 37 people or 14.3% are between 40 and 49, and 30 people or 11.6% are between 50 and 59. The senior population distribution is 31 people or 12.0% of the population are between 60 and 69 years old, 14 people or 5.4% are between 70 and 79, there are 9 people or 3.5% who are between 80 and 89, and there are 2 people or 0.8% who are 90 and older.

As of 2000, there were 109 people who were single and never married in the municipality. There were 133 married individuals, 12 widows or widowers and 5 individuals who are divorced.

As of 2000, there were 104 private households in the municipality, and an average of 2.4 persons per household. There were 33 households that consist of only one person and 11 households with five or more people. In 2000, a total of 100 apartments (84.7% of the total) were permanently occupied, while 10 apartments (8.5%) were seasonally occupied and 8 apartments (6.8%) were empty. As of 2009, the construction rate of new housing units was 9.9 new units per 1000 residents.

The historical population is given in the following chart:

== Politics ==
In the 2011 federal election the most popular party was the SP which received 38.7% of the vote. The next three most popular parties were the SVP (28.2%), the CVP (14.3%) and the FDP (6.3%).

The SPS gained an additional 8.8% of the vote from the 2007 Federal election (29.9% in 2007 vs 38.7% in 2011). The SVP moved from third in 2007 (with 21.6%) to second in 2011, the CVP moved from second in 2007 (with 22.8%) to third and the FDP moved from below fourth place in 2007 to fourth. A total of 87 votes were cast in this election.

== Economy ==
As of 2010, Villeneuve had an unemployment rate of 4.5%. As of 2008, there were 27 people employed in the primary economic sector and about 6 businesses involved in this sector. 45 people were employed in the secondary sector and there were 6 businesses in this sector. 4 people were employed in the tertiary sector, with 2 businesses in this sector. There were 122 residents of the municipality who were employed in some capacity, of which females made up 39.3% of the workforce.

In 2008 the total number of full-time equivalent jobs was 57. The number of jobs in the primary sector was 12, all of which were in agriculture. The number of jobs in the secondary sector was 42 of which 38 or (90.5%) were in manufacturing and 4 (9.5%) were in construction. The number of jobs in the tertiary sector was 3, of which 2 were in a hotel or restaurant and 1 was in education.

In 2000, there were 62 workers who commuted into the municipality and 84 workers who commuted away. The municipality is a net exporter of workers, with about 1.4 workers leaving the municipality for every one entering. Of the working population, 5.7% used public transportation to get to work, and 66.4% used a private car.

== Religion ==
From the 2000 census, 172 or 66.4% were Roman Catholic, while 46 or 17.8% belonged to the Swiss Reformed Church. Of the rest of the population, there were 24 individuals (or about 9.27% of the population) who belonged to another Christian church. There was 1 individual who was Jewish, and 2 (or about 0.77% of the population) who were Islamic. There was 1 person who was Buddhist. 19 (or about 7.34% of the population) belonged to no church, are agnostic or atheist, and 6 individuals (or about 2.32% of the population) did not answer the question.

== Education ==
In Villeneuve about 82 or (31.7%) of the population have completed non-mandatory upper secondary education, and 7 or (2.7%) have completed additional higher education (either university or a Fachhochschule). Of the 7 who completed tertiary schooling, 71.4% were Swiss men, 28.6% were Swiss women.

The Canton of Fribourg school system provides one year of non-obligatory Kindergarten, followed by six years of Primary school. This is followed by three years of obligatory lower Secondary school where the students are separated according to ability and aptitude. Following the lower Secondary students may attend a three or four year optional upper Secondary school. The upper Secondary school is divided into gymnasium (university preparatory) and vocational programs. After they finish the upper Secondary program, students may choose to attend a Tertiary school or continue their apprenticeship.

During the 2010–11 school year, there were a total of 22 students attending one class in Villeneuve. A total of 51 students from the municipality attended any school, either in the municipality or outside of it. The municipality had one primary class and 22 students. During the same year, there were no lower secondary classes in the municipality, but 16 students attended lower secondary school in a neighboring municipality. There were no upper Secondary classes or vocational classes, but there were 6 upper Secondary vocational students who attended classes in another municipality. The municipality had no non-university Tertiary classes, but there were 3 specialized Tertiary students who attended classes in another municipality.

As of 2000, there were 8 students in Villeneuve who came from another municipality, while 31 residents attended schools outside the municipality.
