= Praratoud =

Former municipality, canton of Fribourg

- Former municipality
- Praratoud
- Location of Praratoud
- Location within Switzerland Location within Canton of Fribourg
- Coordinates: 46.733333°N 6.849999°E
- Country: Switzerland
- Canton: Fribourg
- District: Broye
- Municipality: Surpierre

Population (2000)
  - Total: 63
- Time zone: UTC+01:00 (CET)
  - Summer (DST): UTC+02:00 (CEST)
- SFOS number: 2037
- ISO 3166 code: CH-FR
- Website

Praratoud is a former municipality in the Broye district of the canton of Fribourg, Switzerland. It has been part of the municipality of Surpierre since 2005.

== History ==
Praratoud is first mentioned in 1668 as Praratos. It was formerly called La Grange de Praratoud. Its history is closely linked to that of Surpierre: Praratoud was part of the lordship of Surpierre and, from 1536, of the bailiwick of the same name; it then belonged to the district of Estavayer (1798–1803) and to the district of Surpierre (1803–1848). Previously attached to the municipality of Surpierre, Praratoud separated from it in 1815 and adopted its own statutes. It has always belonged to the parish of Surpierre.

In July 1943 a British bomber in distress dropped a bomb at the entrance to the village, destroying about fifteen houses. Praratoud has remained an agricultural village, with fodder and cereal crops and livestock farming. It had 63 inhabitants in 1811, 88 in 1850, 97 in 1900, 84 in 1950 and 63 in 2000. In 2005 it became part of the municipality of Surpierre.

== Bibliography ==
- La Liberté, 14 July 1943
- Le Républicain, 17 October 1985
