= Forel-sur-Lucens =

- Former municipality
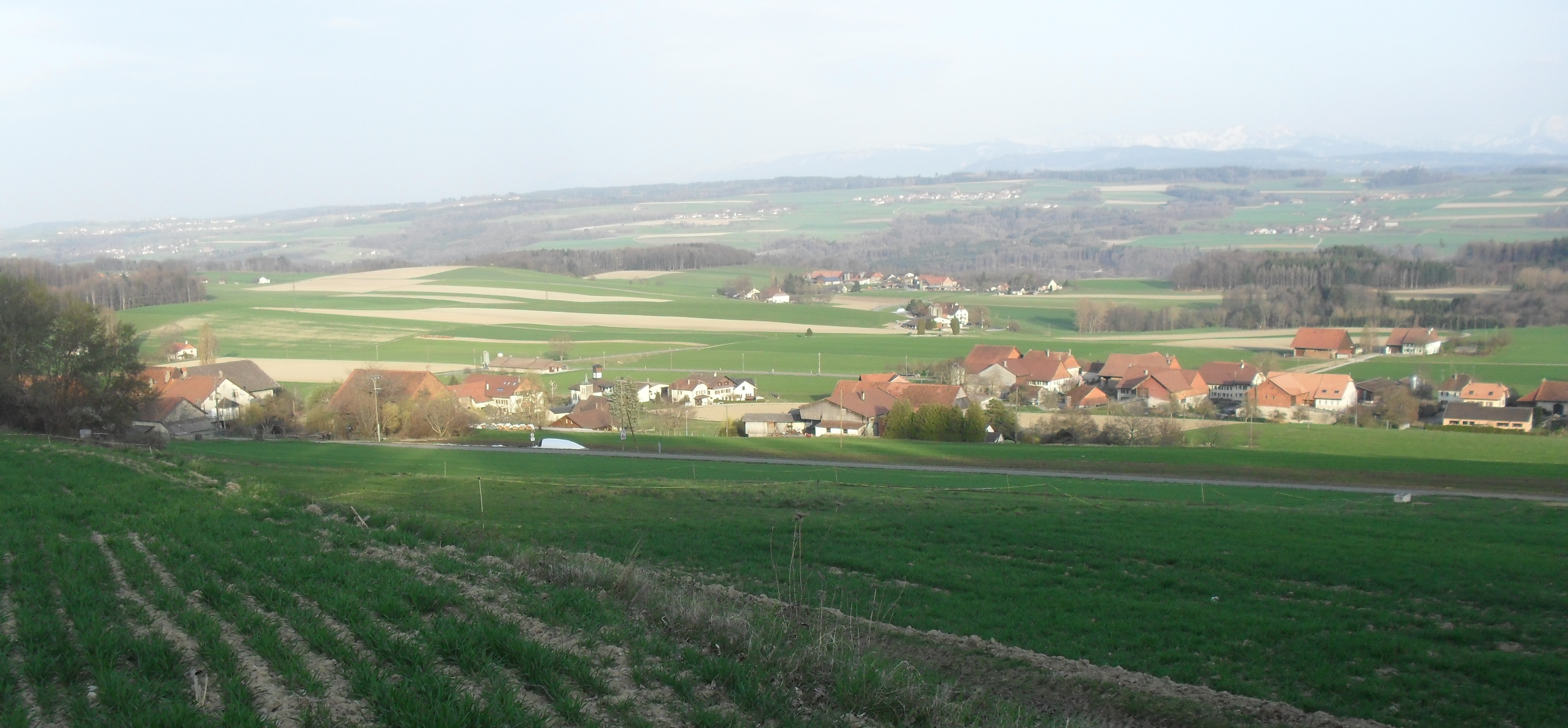

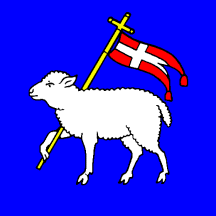
- Flag Coat of arms
- Location of Forel-sur-Lucens
- Location within Switzerland Location within Canton of Vaud
- Coordinates: 46°44′N 6°49′E
- Country: Switzerland
- Canton: Vaud
- District: Broye-Vully

Government
  - Mayor: Syndic

Area
  - Total: 2.83 km^{2} (1.09 sq mi)
- Elevation: 672 m (2,205 ft)

Population (2015)
  - Total: 152
  - Density: 53.7/km^{2} (139/sq mi)
- Time zone: UTC+01:00 (CET)
  - Summer (DST): UTC+02:00 (CEST)
- Postal code: 1526
- SFOS number: 5672
- ISO 3166 code: CH-VD
- Surrounded by: Cheiry (FR), Cremin, Lucens, Oulens-sur-Lucens, Prévondavaux (FR), Surpierre (FR), Villars-le-Comte
- Website: Profile (in French), SFSO statistics

Forel-sur-Lucens is a former municipality in the district Broye-Vully in the canton of Vaud in Switzerland. In 2017, the former municipalities of Forel-sur-Lucens, Brenles, Chesalles-sur-Moudon, Cremin, and Sarzens merged into the municipality of Lucens.

== History ==
Forel-sur-Lucens is first mentioned about 1200 as Forest.

== Geography ==
Forel-sur-Lucens had an area, as of 2009, of 2.83 square kilometers (1.09 sq mi). Of this area, 2.16 km^{2} (0.83 sq mi) or 76.3% is used for agricultural purposes, while 0.53 km^{2} (0.20 sq mi) or 18.7% is forested. Of the rest of the land, 0.16 km^{2} (0.062 sq mi) or 5.7% is settled (buildings or roads).

Of the built up area, housing and buildings made up 2.5% and transportation infrastructure made up 2.5%. Out of the forested land, all of the forested land area is covered with heavy forests. Of the agricultural land, 57.2% is used for growing crops and 17.7% is pastures, while 1.4% is used for orchards or vine crops.

The former municipality was part of the Moudon District until it was dissolved on 31 August 2006, and Forel-sur-Lucens became part of the new district of Broye-Vully.

The former municipality is located on a high plateau above the Broye valley. It consists of the villages of Forel-Dessus and Forel-Dessous.

== Coat of arms ==
The blazon of the municipal coat of arms is Azure, a Paschal Lamb, its pennon Gules a cross Argent.

== Demographics ==
Forel-sur-Lucens had a population (as of 2015) of 152. As of 2008, 5.7% of the population are resident foreign nationals. Over the last 10 years (1999–2009 ) the population has changed at a rate of 8.7%. It has changed at a rate of 11.4% due to migration and at a rate of -2% due to births and deaths.

Most of the population (as of 2000) speaks French (128 or 93.4%), with German being second most common (7 or 5.1%) and English being third (1 or 0.7%).

Of the population in the municipality 60 or about 43.8% were born in Forel-sur-Lucens and lived there in 2000. There were 39 or 28.5% who were born in the same canton, while 27 or 19.7% were born somewhere else in Switzerland, and 8 or 5.8% were born outside of Switzerland.

In 2008 there was 1 live birth to Swiss citizens and there were 2 deaths of Swiss citizens. Ignoring immigration and emigration, the population of Swiss citizens decreased by 1 while the foreign population remained the same. There was 1 non-Swiss woman who immigrated from another country to Switzerland. The total Swiss population change in 2008 (from all sources, including moves across municipal borders) was a decrease of 3 and the non-Swiss population increased by 1 people. This represents a population growth rate of -1.3%.

The age distribution, as of 2009, in Forel-sur-Lucens is; 20 children or 12.3% of the population are between 0 and 9 years old and 20 teenagers or 12.3% are between 10 and 19. Of the adult population, 24 people or 14.8% of the population are between 20 and 29 years old. 22 people or 13.6% are between 30 and 39, 22 people or 13.6% are between 40 and 49, and 17 people or 10.5% are between 50 and 59. The senior population distribution is 22 people or 13.6% of the population are between 60 and 69 years old, 9 people or 5.6% are between 70 and 79, there are 6 people or 3.7% who are between 80 and 89.

As of 2000, there were 54 people who were single and never married in the municipality. There were 76 married individuals, 7 widows or widowers and individuals who are divorced.

As of 2000, there were 46 private households in the municipality, and an average of 3. persons per household. There were 6 households that consist of only one person and 10 households with five or more people. Out of a total of 46 households that answered this question, 13.0% were households made up of just one person and there was 1 adult who lived with their parents. Of the rest of the households, there are 22 married couples without children, 16 married couples with children There was 1 household that was made up of unrelated people.

In 2000 there were 15 single family homes (or 38.5% of the total) out of a total of 39 inhabited buildings. There were 3 multi-family buildings (7.7%), along with 19 multi-purpose buildings that were mostly used for housing (48.7%) and 2 other use buildings (commercial or industrial) that also had some housing (5.1%). Of the single family homes 6 were built before 1919, while 1 were built between 1990 and 2000. The most multi-family homes (2) were built between 1919 and 1945 and the next most (1) were built before 1919.

In 2000 there were 49 apartments in the municipality. The most common apartment size was 3 rooms of which there were 12. There were single room apartments and 24 apartments with five or more rooms. Of these apartments, a total of 46 apartments (93.9% of the total) were permanently occupied, while apartments (0.0%) were seasonally occupied and 3 apartments (6.1%) were empty. As of 2009, the construction rate of new housing units was 6.2 new units per 1000 residents. The vacancy rate for the municipality, in 2010, was 0%.

The historical population is given in the following chart:

== Politics ==
In the 2007 federal election the most popular party was the SVP which received 28.43% of the vote. The next three most popular parties were the FDP (20.92%), the Green Party (14.33%) and the Other (11.03%). In the federal election, a total of 77 votes were cast, and the voter turnout was 69.4%.

== Economy ==
As of 2010, Forel-sur-Lucens had an unemployment rate of 2.7%. As of 2008, there were 31 people employed in the primary economic sector and about 13 businesses involved in this sector. There were no people employed in the secondary sector or tertiary sector. There were 72 residents of the municipality who were employed in some capacity, of which females made up 41.7% of the workforce.

In 2008 the total number of full-time equivalent jobs was 24. The number of jobs in the primary sector was 24, all of which were in agriculture.

In 2000, there were 33 workers who commuted away from the municipality. Of the working population, 2.8% used public transportation to get to work, and 45.8% used a private car.

== Religion ==
From the 2000 census, 6 or 4.4% were Roman Catholic, while 115 or 83.9% belonged to the Swiss Reformed Church. Of the rest of the population, and there were two individuals (or about 1.46% of the population) who belonged to another Christian church. There were three (or about 2.19% of the population) who were Islamic. 11 people (or about 8.03% of the population) belonged to no church, or were agnostic or atheist.

== Education ==
In Forel-sur-Lucens about 39 or (28.5%) of the population have completed non-mandatory upper secondary education, and 25 or (18.2%) have completed additional higher education (either university or a Fachhochschule). Of the 25 who completed tertiary schooling, 80.0% were Swiss men, 20.0% were Swiss women.

In the 2009/2010 school year there were a total of 22 students in the Forel-sur-Lucens school district. In the Vaud cantonal school system, two years of non-obligatory pre-school are provided by the political districts. During the school year, the political district provided pre-school care for a total of 155 children of which 83 children (53.5%) received subsidized pre-school care. The canton's primary school program requires students to attend for four years. There were 11 students in the municipal primary school program. The obligatory lower secondary school program lasts for six years and there were 11 students in those schools.

As of 2000, there were 33 students from Forel-sur-Lucens who attended schools outside the municipality.
