= Villars-le-Comte =

- Municipality
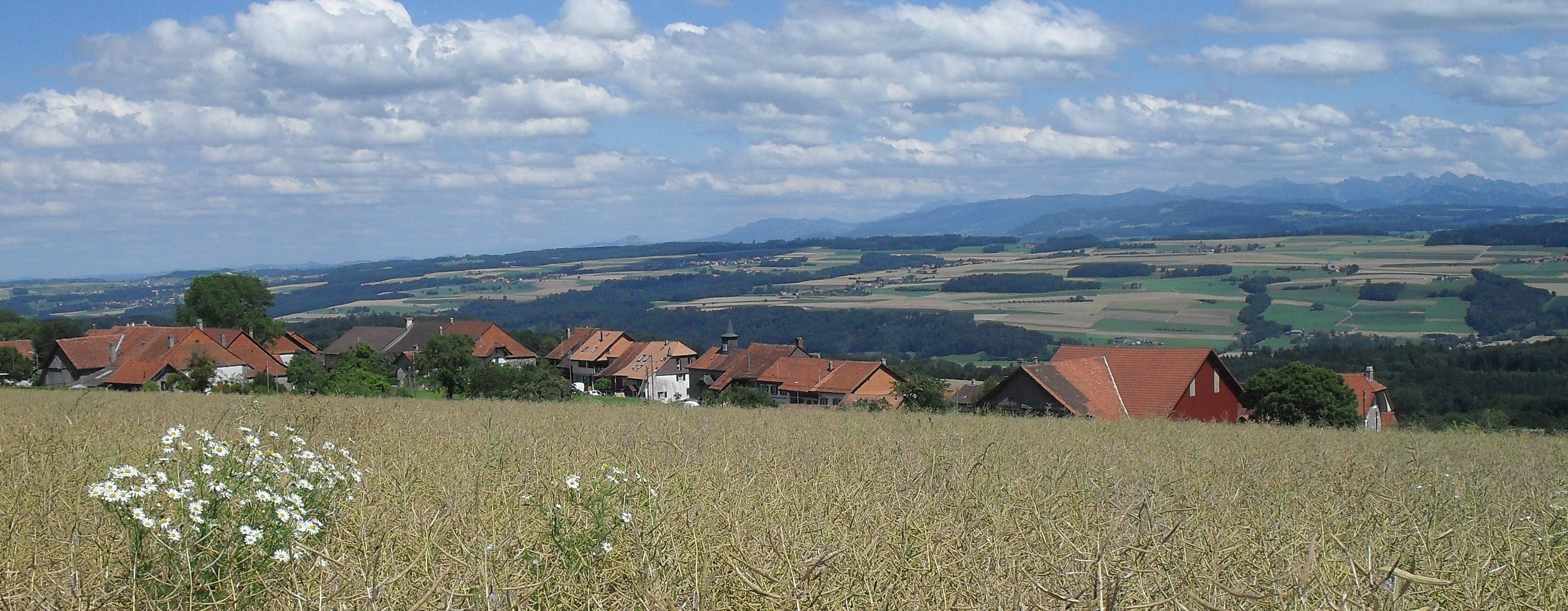

- Flag Coat of arms
- Location of Villars-le-Comte
- Location within Switzerland Location within Canton of Vaud
- Coordinates: 46°43′N 6°48′E
- Country: Switzerland
- Canton: Vaud
- District: Broye-Vully

Government
  - Mayor: Syndic

Area
  - Total: 4.22 km^{2} (1.63 sq mi)
- Elevation: 765 m (2,510 ft)

Population (2003)
  - Total: 129
  - Density: 30.6/km^{2} (79.2/sq mi)
- Time zone: UTC+01:00 (CET)
  - Summer (DST): UTC+02:00 (CEST)
- Postal code: 1515
- SFOS number: 5690
- ISO 3166 code: CH-VD
- Surrounded by: Denezy, Forel-sur-Lucens, Neyruz-sur-Moudon, Oulens-sur-Lucens, Prévondavaux (FR)
- Website: www.villars-le-comte.ch

Villars-le-Comte is a municipality in the district Broye-Vully in the canton of Vaud in Switzerland.

== Geography ==
Villars-le-Comte has an area, as of 2009, of 4.2 square kilometers (1.6 mi^{2}). Of this area, 2.94 km^{2} (1.14 mi^{2}) or 70.2% is used for agricultural purposes, while 1.06 km^{2} (0.41 mi^{2}) or 25.3% is forested. Of the rest of the land, 0.19 km^{2} (0.073 mi^{2}) or 4.5% is settled (buildings or roads).

Of the built up area, housing and buildings made up 1.4% and transportation infrastructure made up 2.9%. Out of the forested land, 23.6% of the total land area is heavily forested and 1.7% is covered with orchards or small clusters of trees. Of the agricultural land, 54.4% is used for growing crops and 15.0% is pastures.

The municipality was part of the Moudon District until it was dissolved on 31 August 2006, and Villars-le-Comte became part of the new district of Broye-Vully.

== Coat of arms ==
The blazon of the municipal coat of arms is Quartered Gules and Vert, overall between two Swords in saltire a Crown, all Or.

== Demographics ==
Villars-le-Comte has a population (as of December 2020) of 120. As of 2008, 8.7% of the population are resident foreign nationals. Over the last 10 years (1999–2009 ) the population has changed at a rate of 16.3%. It has changed at a rate of 14.6% due to migration and at a rate of 1.6% due to births and deaths.

Most of the population (as of 2000) speaks French (118 or 96.7%), with German being second most common (1 or 0.8%) and Italian being third (1 or 0.8%).

Of the population in the municipality 53 or about 43.4% were born in Villars-le-Comte and lived there in 2000. There were 43 or 35.2% who were born in the same canton, while 13 or 10.7% were born somewhere else in Switzerland, and 8 or 6.6% were born outside of Switzerland.

In 2008 there was 1 live birth to Swiss citizens. Ignoring immigration and emigration, the population of Swiss citizens increased by 1 while the foreign population remained the same. There was 1 Swiss man who emigrated from Switzerland. At the same time, there were 1 non-Swiss woman who immigrated from another country to Switzerland. The total Swiss population change in 2008 (from all sources, including moves across municipal borders) was an increase of 3 and the non-Swiss population remained the same. This represents a population growth rate of 2.1%.

The age distribution, as of 2009, in Villars-le-Comte is; 15 children or 10.5% of the population are between 0 and 9 years old and 21 teenagers or 14.7% are between 10 and 19. Of the adult population, 10 people or 7.0% of the population are between 20 and 29 years old. 12 people or 8.4% are between 30 and 39, 22 people or 15.4% are between 40 and 49, and 25 people or 17.5% are between 50 and 59. The senior population distribution is 12 people or 8.4% of the population are between 60 and 69 years old, 13 people or 9.1% are between 70 and 79, there are 12 people or 8.4% who are between 80 and 89, and there is 1 person who is 90 and older.

As of 2000, there were 38 people who were single and never married in the municipality. There were 71 married individuals, 9 widows or widowers and 4 individuals who are divorced.

As of 2000, there were 49 private households in the municipality, and an average of 2.5 persons per household. There were 11 households that consist of only one person and 5 households with five or more people. Out of a total of 49 households that answered this question, 22.4% were households made up of just one person. Of the rest of the households, there are 18 married couples without children, 17 married couples with children There was one single parent with a child or children. There were 2 households that were made up of unrelated people.

In 2000 there were 27 single family homes (or 57.4% of the total) out of a total of 47 inhabited buildings. There were 5 multi-family buildings (10.6%), along with 12 multi-purpose buildings that were mostly used for housing (25.5%) and 3 other use buildings (commercial or industrial) that also had some housing (6.4%). Of the single family homes 14 were built before 1919. The most multi-family homes (4) were built before 1919 and the next most (1) were built between 1919 and 1945.

In 2000 there were 58 apartments in the municipality. The most common apartment size was 4 rooms of which there were 23. There were 1 single room apartments and 12 apartments with five or more rooms. Of these apartments, a total of 49 apartments (84.5% of the total) were permanently occupied, while 6 apartments (10.3%) were seasonally occupied and 3 apartments (5.2%) were empty. As of 2009, the construction rate of new housing units was 7 new units per 1000 residents. The vacancy rate for the municipality, in 2010, was 0%.

The historical population is given in the following chart:

== Politics ==
In the 2007 federal election the most popular party was the SVP which received 47.69% of the vote. The next three most popular parties were the SP (16.47%), the Green Party (14.45%) and the FDP (11.13%). In the federal election, a total of 39 votes were cast, and the voter turnout was 37.5%.

== Economy ==
As of 2010, Villars-le-Comte had an unemployment rate of 3.2%. As of 2008, there were 19 people employed in the primary economic sector and about 7 businesses involved in this sector. No one was employed in the secondary sector. 9 people were employed in the tertiary sector, with 3 businesses in this sector. There were 58 residents of the municipality who were employed in some capacity, of which females made up 43.1% of the workforce.

In 2008 the total number of full-time equivalent jobs was 18. The number of jobs in the primary sector was 14, all of which were in agriculture. There were no jobs in the secondary sector. The number of jobs in the tertiary sector was 4. In the tertiary sector; 3 or 75.0% were in the movement and storage of goods, 1 was a technical professional or scientist, .

In 2000, there were 34 workers who commuted away from the municipality. Of the working population, 6.9% used public transportation to get to work, and 63.8% used a private car.

== Religion ==
From the 2000 census, 7 or 5.7% were Roman Catholic, while 86 or 70.5% belonged to the Swiss Reformed Church. Of the rest of the population, there were 22 individuals (or about 18.03% of the population) who belonged to another Christian church. 16 (or about 13.11% of the population) belonged to no church, are agnostic or atheist, and 2 individuals (or about 1.64% of the population) did not answer the question.

== Education ==
In Villars-le-Comte about 34 or (27.9%) of the population have completed non-mandatory upper secondary education, and 10 or (8.2%) have completed additional higher education (either university or a Fachhochschule). Of the 10 who completed tertiary schooling, 60.0% were Swiss men, 20.0% were Swiss women.

In the 2009/2010 school year there were a total of 17 students in the Villars-le-Comte school district. In the Vaud cantonal school system, two years of non-obligatory pre-school are provided by the political districts. During the school year, the political district provided pre-school care for a total of 155 children of which 83 children (53.5%) received subsidized pre-school care. The canton's primary school program requires students to attend for four years. There were 7 students in the municipal primary school program. The obligatory lower secondary school program lasts for six years and there were 10 students in those schools.

As of 2000, there were 17 students from Villars-le-Comte who attended schools outside the municipality.
