= Chapelle, Broye =

Village in the canton of Fribourg, Switzerland

Coordinates: 46.767°N 6.850°E

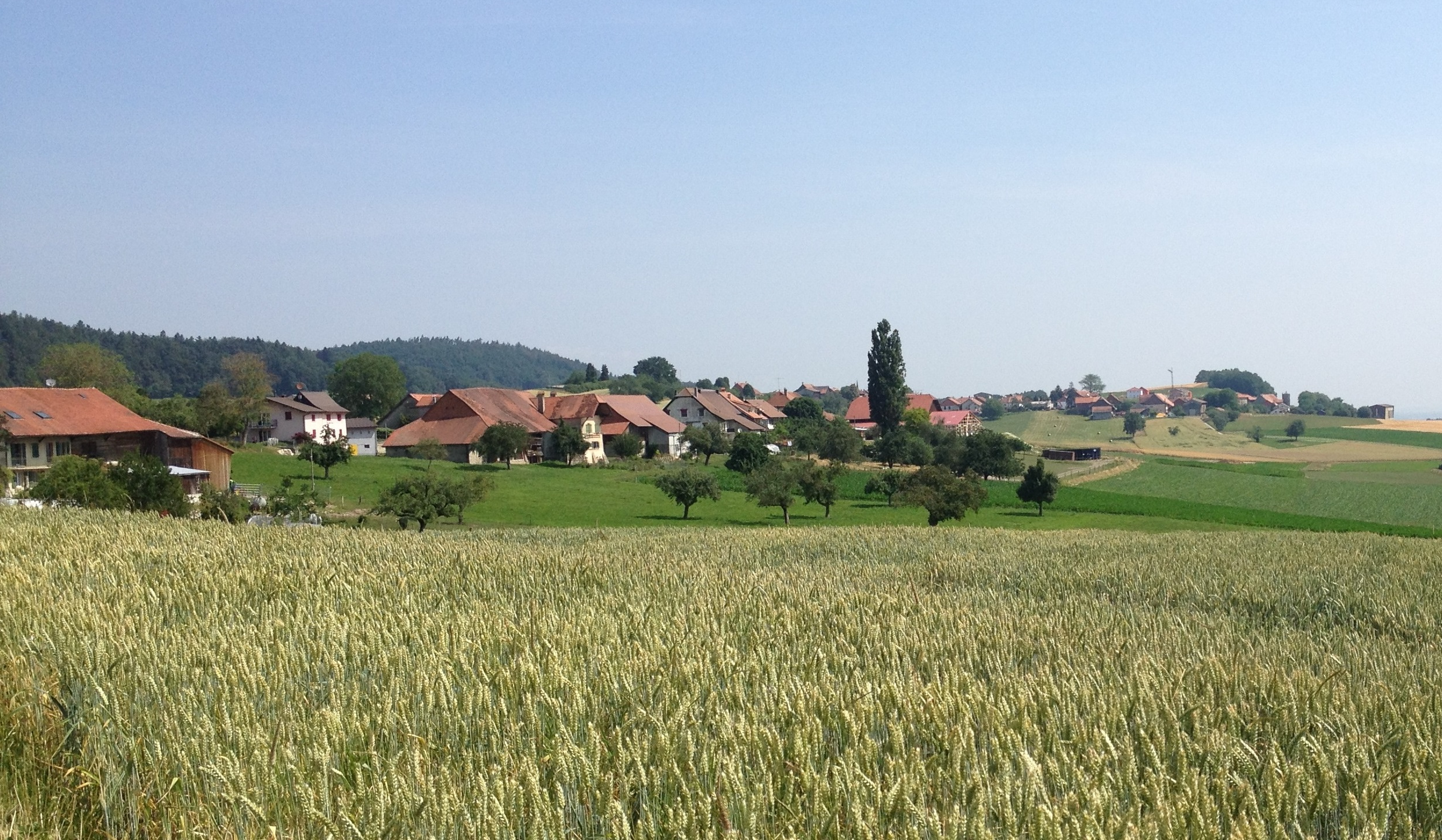
Chapelle

Chapelle (Arpitan: Tsapala) is a village and former municipality in the district of Broye in the canton of Fribourg, Switzerland.

It was first recorded in 1363 as Cappella. It was named Chapelle-près-Surpierre until 1953, when the name changed to Chapelle.

The municipality also contained the villages Coumin-Dessus and Coumin-Dessous. It had 85 inhabitants in 1811, which increased to 129 in 1831. It then decreased to 120 in 1850, 113 in 1900, 117 in 1950 and 64 in 2000.

In 2005 the municipality was incorporated into the larger, neighboring municipality Cheiry.
