= Oulens-sur-Lucens =

- Former municipality
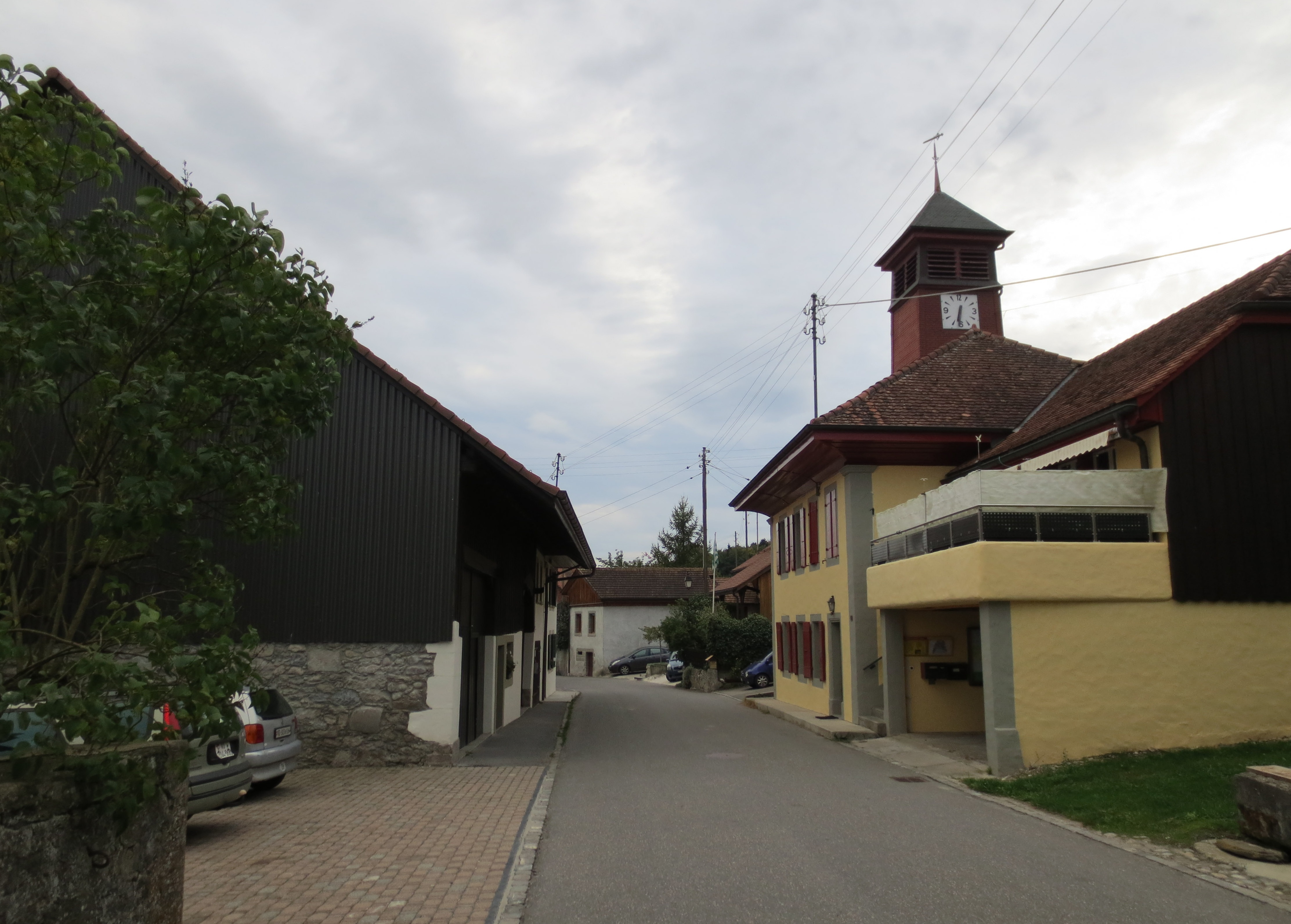

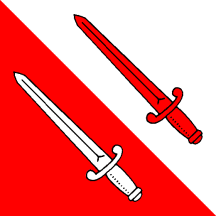
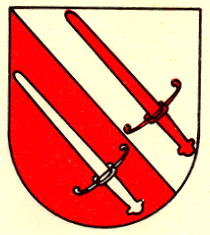
- Flag Coat of arms
- Location of Oulens-sur-Lucens
- Location within Switzerland Location within Canton of Vaud
- Coordinates: 46°42′N 6°49′E
- Country: Switzerland
- Canton: Vaud
- District: Broye-Vully

Area
  - Total: 1.59 km^{2} (0.61 sq mi)
- Elevation: 633 m (2,077 ft)

Population (2003)
  - Total: 51
  - Density: 32/km^{2} (83/sq mi)
- Time zone: UTC+01:00 (CET)
  - Summer (DST): UTC+02:00 (CEST)
- Postal code: 1522
- SFOS number: 5681
- ISO 3166 code: CH-VD
- Surrounded by: Bussy-sur-Moudon, Forel-sur-Lucens, Lucens, Neyruz-sur-Moudon, Villars-le-Comte
- Website: Profile (in French), SFSO statistics

Oulens-sur-Lucens is a former municipality in the district of Broye-Vully in the canton of Vaud in Switzerland.

On July 1, 2011 it was merged into Lucens.

== History ==
Oulens-sur-Lucens is first mentioned around 1403-09 as Olens.

== Geography ==
Oulens-sur-Lucens has an area, as of 2009, of 1.59 square kilometers (0.61 sq mi). Of this area, 0.89 km^{2} (0.34 sq mi) or 56.0% is used for agricultural purposes, while 0.55 km^{2} (0.21 sq mi) or 34.6% is forested. Of the rest of the land, 0.12 km^{2} (30 acres) or 7.5% is settled (buildings or roads).

Of the built up area, housing and buildings made up 1.9% and transportation infrastructure made up 5.7%. Out of the forested land, 30.8% of the total land area is heavily forested and 3.8% is covered with orchards or small clusters of trees. Of the agricultural land, 25.2% is used for growing crops and 30.2% is pastures.

The municipality was part of the Moudon District until it was dissolved on 31 August 2006, and Oulens-sur-Lucens became part of the new district of Broye-Vully.

The municipality is located on the left side of the Broye river. It consists of the village of Oulens-sur-Lucens and the hamlet of La Crause.

== Coat of arms ==
The blazon of the municipal coat of arms is Per bend Argent and Gules, two Swords bendwise counterchanged.

== Demographics ==
Oulens-sur-Lucens had a population (as of 2003) of 51. As of 2008, 7.8% of the population are resident foreign nationals. Over the last 10 years (1999–2009) the population has changed at a rate of -7.1%. It has changed at a rate of -5.4% due to migration and at a rate of -1.8% due to births and deaths.

All of the population (as of 2000) speaks French.

Of the population in the municipality 18 or about 34.6% were born in Oulens-sur-Lucens and lived there in 2000. There were 21 or 40.4% who were born in the same canton, while 9 or 17.3% were born somewhere else in Switzerland, and 3 or 5.8% were born outside of Switzerland.

In 2008 total Swiss population change (from all sources, including moves across municipal borders) was an increase of 1 and the non-Swiss population remained the same. This represents a population growth rate of 2.0%.

The age distribution, as of 2009, in Oulens-sur-Lucens is; 3 children or 5.8% of the population are between 0 and 9 years old and 6 teenagers or 11.5% are between 10 and 19. Of the adult population, 3 people or 5.8% of the population are between 20 and 29 years old. 8 people or 15.4% are between 30 and 39, 10 people or 19.2% are between 40 and 49, and 8 people or 15.4% are between 50 and 59. The senior population distribution is 5 people or 9.6% of the population are between 60 and 69 years old, 5 people or 9.6% are between 70 and 79, there are 3 people or 5.8% who are between 80 and 89, and there is 1 person who is 90 and older.

As of 2000, there were 20 people who were single and never married in the municipality. There were 26 married individuals, 5 widows or widowers and 1 individuals who are divorced.

As of 2000 the average number of residents per living room was 0.58 which is about equal to the cantonal average of 0.61 per room. In this case, a room is defined as space of a housing unit of at least 4 m^{2} (43 sq ft) as normal bedrooms, dining rooms, living rooms, kitchens and habitable cellars and attics. About 61.1% of the total households were owner occupied, or in other words did not pay rent (though they may have a mortgage or a rent-to-own agreement).

As of 2000, there were 19 private households in the municipality, and an average of 2.7 persons per household. There were 5 households that consist of only one person and 2 households with five or more people. Out of a total of 20 households that answered this question, 25.0% were households made up of just one person and there was 1 adult who lived with their parents. Of the rest of the households, there are 5 married couples without children and 7 married couples with children. There was one single parent with a child or children.

In 2000 there were 12 single family homes (or 60.0% of the total) out of a total of 20 inhabited buildings. There were 7 multi-purpose buildings that were mostly used for housing (35.0%) and 1 other use building (commercial or industrial) that also had some housing (5.0%). Of the single family homes 6 were built before 1919, while 1 was built between 1990 and 2000.

In 2000 there were 20 apartments in the municipality. The most common apartment size was 4 rooms of which there were 8. There were no single room apartments and 7 apartments with five or more rooms. Of these apartments, a total of 18 apartments (90.0% of the total) were permanently occupied, while 2 apartments (10.0%) were seasonally occupied. As of 2009, the construction rate of new housing units was 0 new units per 1000 residents. The vacancy rate for the municipality, in 2010, was 0%.

The historical population is given in the following chart:

== Politics ==
In the 2007 federal election the most popular party was the SVP which received 49.17% of the vote. The next three most popular parties were the FDP (36.67%), the Green Party (10.83%) and the CVP (1.67%). In the federal election, a total of 20 votes were cast, and the voter turnout was 54.1%.

== Economy ==
As of 2010, Oulens-sur-Lucens had an unemployment rate of 5.4%. As of 2008, there were 5 people employed in the primary economic sector and about 2 businesses involved in this sector. 1 person was employed in the secondary sector and there was 1 business in this sector. No one was employed in the tertiary sector. There were 23 residents of the municipality who were employed in some capacity, of which females made up 39.1% of the workforce.

In 2008 the total number of full-time equivalent jobs was 5. The number of jobs in the primary sector was 4, all of which were in agriculture. The number of jobs in the secondary sector was 1, in manufacturing.

In 2000, there were 4 workers who commuted into the municipality and 10 workers who commuted away. The municipality is a net exporter of workers, with about 2.5 workers leaving the municipality for every one entering. Of the working population, 0% used public transportation to get to work, and 47.8% used a private car.

== Religion ==
From the 2000 census, 6 or 11.5% were Roman Catholic, while 41 or 78.8% belonged to the Swiss Reformed Church. 5 (or about 9.62% of the population) belonged to no church, are agnostic or atheist.

== Education ==
In Oulens-sur-Lucens about 14 or (26.9%) of the population have completed non-mandatory upper secondary education, and 5 or (9.6%) have completed additional higher education (either university or a Fachhochschule). Of the 5 who completed tertiary schooling, 4 were Swiss men and 1 was a Swiss woman.

In the 2009/2010 school year there was 1 student in the Oulens-sur-Lucens school district. In the Vaud cantonal school system, two years of non-obligatory pre-school are provided by the political districts. During the school year, the political district provided pre-school care for a total of 155 children of which 83 children (53.5%) received subsidized pre-school care. The canton's primary school program requires students to attend for four years. There were no students in the municipal primary school program. The obligatory lower secondary school program lasts for six years and there was 1 student in the secondary school.

As of 2000, there were 2 students in Oulens-sur-Lucens who came from another municipality, while 12 residents attended schools outside the municipality.
