= Chesalles =

Chesalles may refer to:

- Chesalles-sur-Moudon, Vaud, Switzerland
- Chesalles-sur-Oron, Vaud, Switzerland
