= Peiry =

Peiry is a surname. Notable people with the surname include:

- Lucienne Peiry (born 1961), Swiss art historian
- Michel Peiry (born 1959), Swiss serial killer

== See also ==
- Perry (surname)
- Pery (disambiguation)
