= Hennens =

Former municipality, canton of Fribourg

- Former municipality
- Hennens

- Coat of arms
- Location of Hennens
- Location within Switzerland Location within Canton of Fribourg
- Coordinates: 46.6824°N 6.8853°E
- Country: Switzerland
- Canton: Fribourg
- District: Glâne
- Municipality: Billens-Hennens

Population (1990)
  - Total: 106
- Time zone: UTC+01:00 (CET)
  - Summer (DST): UTC+02:00 (CEST)
- SFOS number: 2080
- ISO 3166 code: CH-FR
- Website

Hennens is a former municipality in the Glâne district of the canton of Fribourg, Switzerland. In 1998 it merged with Billens to form the municipality of Billens-Hennens. It lies on the border with the canton of Vaud, 3.5 kilometres (2.2 mi) from Romont.

== History ==
Hennens is first mentioned in 1403 as Henens. Hauterive Abbey levied the tithe on the whole territory of the lordship of Hennens, which was under Savoy until 1536, then part of the bailiwick of Romont until 1798 and afterwards of the district of the same name until 1848. The lordship was held by Georges de Challant in 1579, by the Ratzé family from 1583 to 1591 and by Baron François Pierre König, known as de Mohr, from 1629 to 1647; König was a general in imperial service and avoyer of Fribourg. The lordship then belonged to the Gottrau family until 1798.

Hennens has always been part of the parish of Billens, mentioned in 1228. Its chapel, dedicated to Saint Bernard, was built on the Praz-de-l'Hostoz in 1653 and restored around 1870. Agriculture (beets, maize and potatoes) and livestock farming have remained the main activities.

Hennens had 102 inhabitants in 1811, 162 in 1850, 173 in 1900, 206 in 1950 and 106 in 1990. In 1998 it merged with Billens to form Billens-Hennens.

== Bibliography ==
- A. Dellion, Dictionnaire historique et statistique des paroisses catholiques du canton de Fribourg, 1884–1902, 2, 133, 151–154
- A. Maillard, Hennens et son passé, 1996
