= Lovatens =

- Municipality
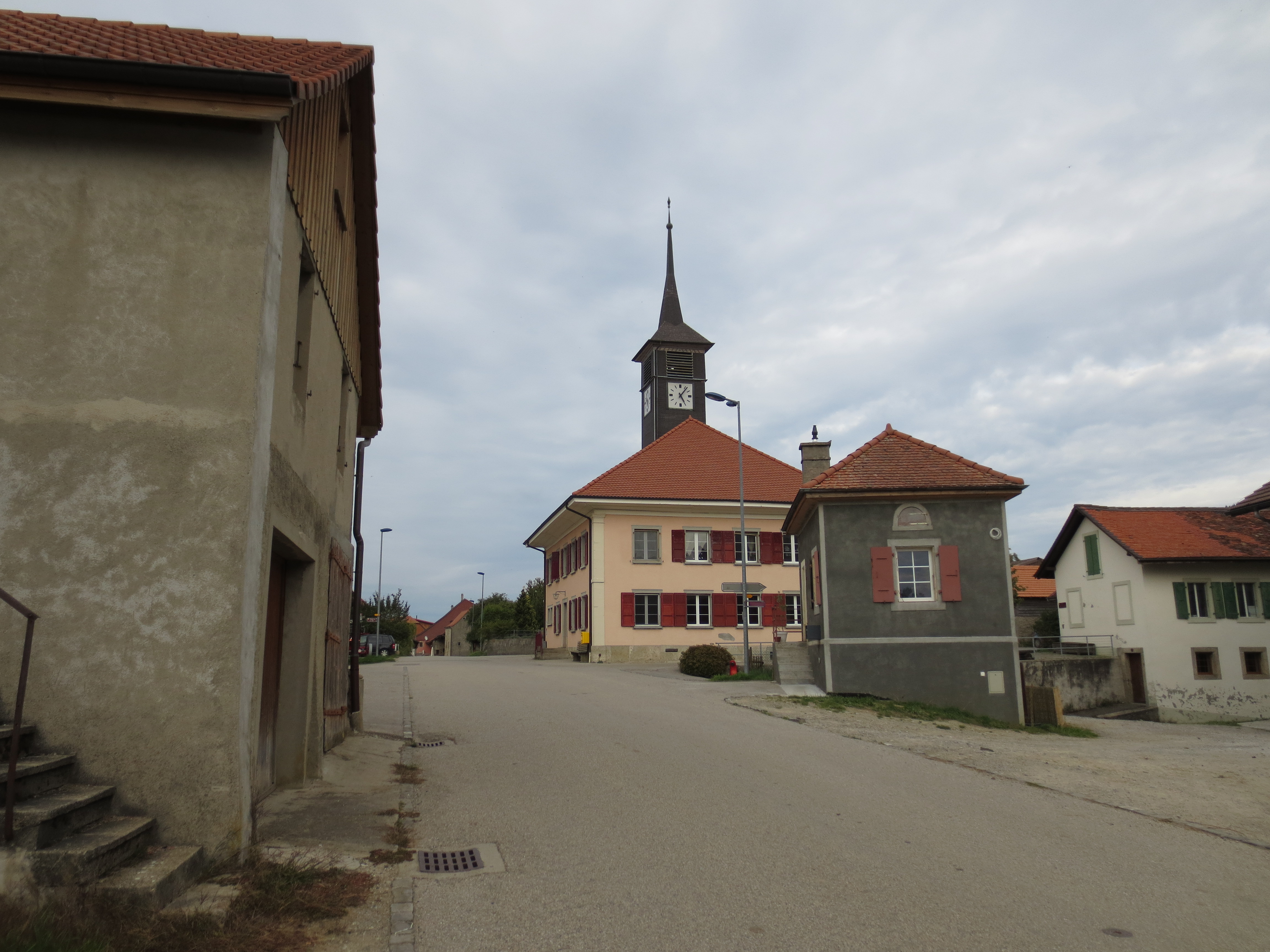

- Flag Coat of arms
- Location of Lovatens
- Location within Switzerland Location within Canton of Vaud
- Coordinates: 46°41′N 6°52′E
- Country: Switzerland
- Canton: Vaud
- District: Broye-Vully

Government
  - Mayor: Syndic

Area
  - Total: 3.47 km^{2} (1.34 sq mi)
- Elevation: 712 m (2,336 ft)

Population (2003)
  - Total: 149
  - Density: 42.9/km^{2} (111/sq mi)
- Time zone: UTC+01:00 (CET)
  - Summer (DST): UTC+02:00 (CEST)
- Postal code: 1682
- SFOS number: 5674
- ISO 3166 code: CH-VD
- Surrounded by: Billens-Hennens (FR), Brenles, Curtilles, Dompierre, Prévonloup, Sarzens
- Website: www.lovatens.ch

Lovatens (French pronunciation: [lɔvatɑ̃]) is a municipality in the district Broye-Vully in the canton of Vaud in Switzerland.

== History ==
Lovatens is first mentioned between 996 and 1017 as Lovatingis.

== Geography ==
Lovatens has an area, as of 2009, of 3.47 square kilometers (1.34 sq mi). Of this area, 2.71 km^{2} (1.05 sq mi) or 78.1% is used for agricultural purposes, while 0.62 km^{2} (0.24 sq mi) or 17.9% is forested. Of the rest of the land, 0.13 km^{2} (32 acres) or 3.7% is settled (buildings or roads).

Of the built up area, housing and buildings made up 1.4% and transportation infrastructure made up 2.3%. Out of the forested land, 16.4% of the total land area is heavily forested and 1.4% is covered with orchards or small clusters of trees. Of the agricultural land, 60.8% is used for growing crops and 17.0% is pastures.

The municipality was part of the Moudon District until it was dissolved on 31 August 2006, and Lovatens became part of the new district of Broye-Vully.

The municipality is located to the right of the Broye river. It consists of the village of Lovatens and the hamlets of Colans and Prassy.

== Coat of arms ==
The blazon of the municipal coat of arms is Per bend Argent and Gules, overall a Minerva's head Or.

== Demographics ==
Lovatens has a population (as of December 2020) of 142. As of 2008, 0.7% of the population are resident foreign nationals. Over the last 10 years (1999–2009 ) the population has changed at a rate of 0.7%. It has changed at a rate of 4.9% due to migration and at a rate of -4.9% due to births and deaths.

Most of the population (as of 2000) speaks French (140 or 92.7%), with German being second most common (7 or 4.6%) and English being third (3 or 2.0%).

Of the population in the municipality 57 or about 37.7% were born in Lovatens and lived there in 2000. There were 52 or 34.4% who were born in the same canton, while 27 or 17.9% were born somewhere else in Switzerland, and 12 or 7.9% were born outside of Switzerland.

In 2008 there were live births to Swiss citizens and were 3 deaths of Swiss citizens. Ignoring immigration and emigration, the population of Swiss citizens decreased by 3 while the foreign population remained the same. The total Swiss population change in 2008 (from all sources, including moves across municipal borders) was a decrease of 8 and the non-Swiss population decreased by 1 people. This represents a population growth rate of -6.2%.

The age distribution, as of 2009, in Lovatens is; 17 children or 11.9% of the population are between 0 and 9 years old and 18 teenagers or 12.6% are between 10 and 19. Of the adult population, 16 people or 11.2% of the population are between 20 and 29 years old. 15 people or 10.5% are between 30 and 39, 27 people or 18.9% are between 40 and 49, and 14 people or 9.8% are between 50 and 59. The senior population distribution is 16 people or 11.2% of the population are between 60 and 69 years old, 12 people or 8.4% are between 70 and 79, there are 5 people or 3.5% who are between 80 and 89, and there are 3 people or 2.1% who are 90 and older.

As of 2000, there were 69 people who were single and never married in the municipality. There were 64 married individuals, 8 widows or widowers and 10 individuals who are divorced.

As of 2000, there were 58 private households in the municipality, and an average of 2.6 persons per household. There were 17 households that consist of only one person and 6 households with five or more people. Out of a total of 59 households that answered this question, 28.8% were households made up of just one person and there was 1 adult who lived with their parents. Of the rest of the households, there are 12 married couples without children, 22 married couples with children There were 5 single parents with a child or children. There was 1 household that was made up of unrelated people and 1 household that was made up of some sort of institution or another collective housing.

In 2000 there were 26 single family homes (or 54.2% of the total) out of a total of 48 inhabited buildings. There were 3 multi-family buildings (6.3%), along with 17 multi-purpose buildings that were mostly used for housing (35.4%) and 2 other use buildings (commercial or industrial) that also had some housing (4.2%). Of the single family homes 17 were built before 1919, while 2 were built between 1990 and 2000. The most multi-family homes (3) were built before 1919 and the next most () were built between 1919 and 1945.

In 2000 there were 61 apartments in the municipality. The most common apartment size was 5 rooms of which there were 19. There were single room apartments and 34 apartments with five or more rooms. Of these apartments, a total of 58 apartments (95.1% of the total) were permanently occupied, while 2 apartments (3.3%) were seasonally occupied and 1 apartments (1.6%) were empty. As of 2009, the construction rate of new housing units was 0 new units per 1000 residents. The vacancy rate for the municipality, in 2010, was 0%.

The historical population is given in the following chart:

== Sights ==
The entire village of Lovatens is designated as part of the Inventory of Swiss Heritage Sites.

== Politics ==
In the 2007 federal election the most popular party was the SVP which received 48.05% of the vote. The next three most popular parties were the SP (18.07%), the Green Party (12.32%) and the FDP (6.57%). In the federal election, a total of 55 votes were cast, and the voter turnout was 49.1%.

== Economy ==
As of 2010, Lovatens had an unemployment rate of 2.7%. As of 2008, there were 24 people employed in the primary economic sector and about 9 businesses involved in this sector. people were employed in the secondary sector and there were businesses in this sector. 4 people were employed in the tertiary sector, with 1 business in this sector. There were 62 residents of the municipality who were employed in some capacity, of which females made up 43.5% of the workforce.

In 2008 the total number of full-time equivalent jobs was 21. The number of jobs in the primary sector was 17, all of which were in agriculture. There were no jobs in the secondary sector. The number of jobs in the tertiary sector was 4, all in the sale or repair of motor vehicles.

In 2000, there were 42 workers who commuted away from the municipality. Of the working population, 11.3% used public transportation to get to work, and 56.5% used a private car.

== Religion ==
From the 2000 census, 19 or 12.6% were Roman Catholic, while 90 or 59.6% belonged to the Swiss Reformed Church. There was 1 individual who was Islamic. 40 (or about 26.49% of the population) belonged to no church, are agnostic or atheist, and 1 individuals (or about 0.66% of the population) did not answer the question.

== Education ==
In Lovatens about 51 or (33.8%) of the population have completed non-mandatory upper secondary education, and 19 or (12.6%) have completed additional higher education (either university or a Fachhochschule). Of the 19 who completed tertiary schooling, 52.6% were Swiss men, 36.8% were Swiss women.

In the 2009/2010 school year there were a total of 17 students in the Lovatens school district. In the Vaud cantonal school system, two years of non-obligatory pre-school are provided by the political districts. During the school year, the political district provided pre-school care for a total of 155 children of which 83 children (53.5%) received subsidized pre-school care. The canton's primary school program requires students to attend for four years. There were 11 students in the municipal primary school program. The obligatory lower secondary school program lasts for six years and there were 6 students in those schools.

As of 2000, there were 39 students from Lovatens who attended schools outside the municipality.
