= Billens =

Former municipality, canton of Fribourg

- Former municipality
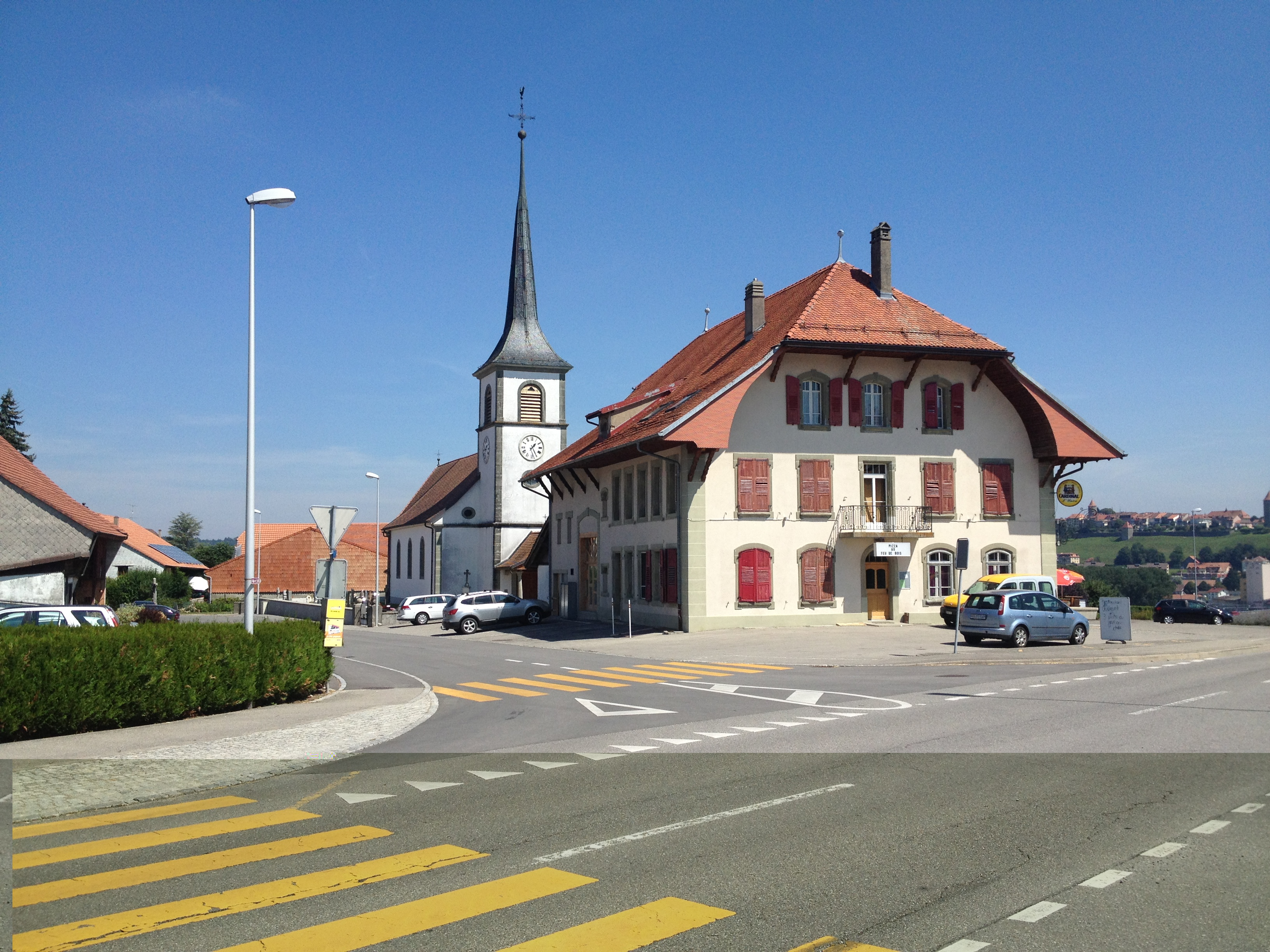
- Billens

- Coat of arms
- Location of Billens
- Location within Switzerland Location within Canton of Fribourg
- Coordinates: 46.6904°N 6.8994°E
- Country: Switzerland
- Canton: Fribourg
- District: Glâne
- Municipality: Billens-Hennens

Population (1990)
  - Total: 410
- Time zone: UTC+01:00 (CET)
  - Summer (DST): UTC+02:00 (CEST)
- SFOS number: 2063
- ISO 3166 code: CH-FR
- Website

Billens is a former municipality in the Glâne district of the canton of Fribourg, Switzerland. Since 1998 it has been part of the municipality of Billens-Hennens. It lies on the cantonal road from Romont to Lucens.

== History ==
Billens is first mentioned in 1155 as Bitlens. A fortified house (maison forte) of the lords of Billens is mentioned from the 15th century; it was destroyed after 1718. A new castle, built outside the village, was bequeathed to the State of Fribourg in 1864 to be converted into a district hospice, and in 1937 into a hospital, which provided many jobs for the whole region.

The lordship of the noble family of Billens (12th–15th centuries), vassals of the Bishop of Lausanne and later of the House of Savoy, comprised the territory of the municipality of Billens and, until 1239, the hill of Romont. Through marriage it became part of the patrimony of the County of Gruyère in 1365, and before 1402 it was incorporated into the lordship of Palézieux. In 1402 it was sold to Richard d'Illens, and the ground rents and dues were then ceded to Michel de Fer. From the d'Illens family the lordship passed through several hands from the end of the 15th century to 1648, and it then belonged to the Gottrau family until 1798. Billens was part of the bailiwick of Romont from 1536 and of the district of the same name from 1798, and from 1848 it belonged to the Glâne district.

The parish, mentioned in 1228, includes Hennens. The right of collation belonged to the Billens family and then to the lords of Billens, and it was ceded to the parish in 1826. The church of Saint-Maurice, enlarged in 1659, was rebuilt from 1827 to 1831. There were mills and sawmills in the 19th century. Billens has become a suburb of Romont while keeping its rural character.

Billens had 157 inhabitants in 1811, 174 in 1850, 214 in 1880, 264 in 1900, 424 in 1941, 399 in 1950, 399 in 1980 and 410 in 1990. Since 1998 it has been part of Billens-Hennens.

== Bibliography ==
- A. Dellion, Dictionnaire historique et statistique des paroisses catholiques du canton de Fribourg, 1884–1902, 2, 133–157
- P. de Zurich, "Histoire de la seigneurie de Billens", in Revue d'histoire suisse, 2, 1922, 145–182
- B. de Vevey, Châteaux et maisons fortes du canton de Fribourg, 1978, 40–46
