= Curtilles =

- Municipality
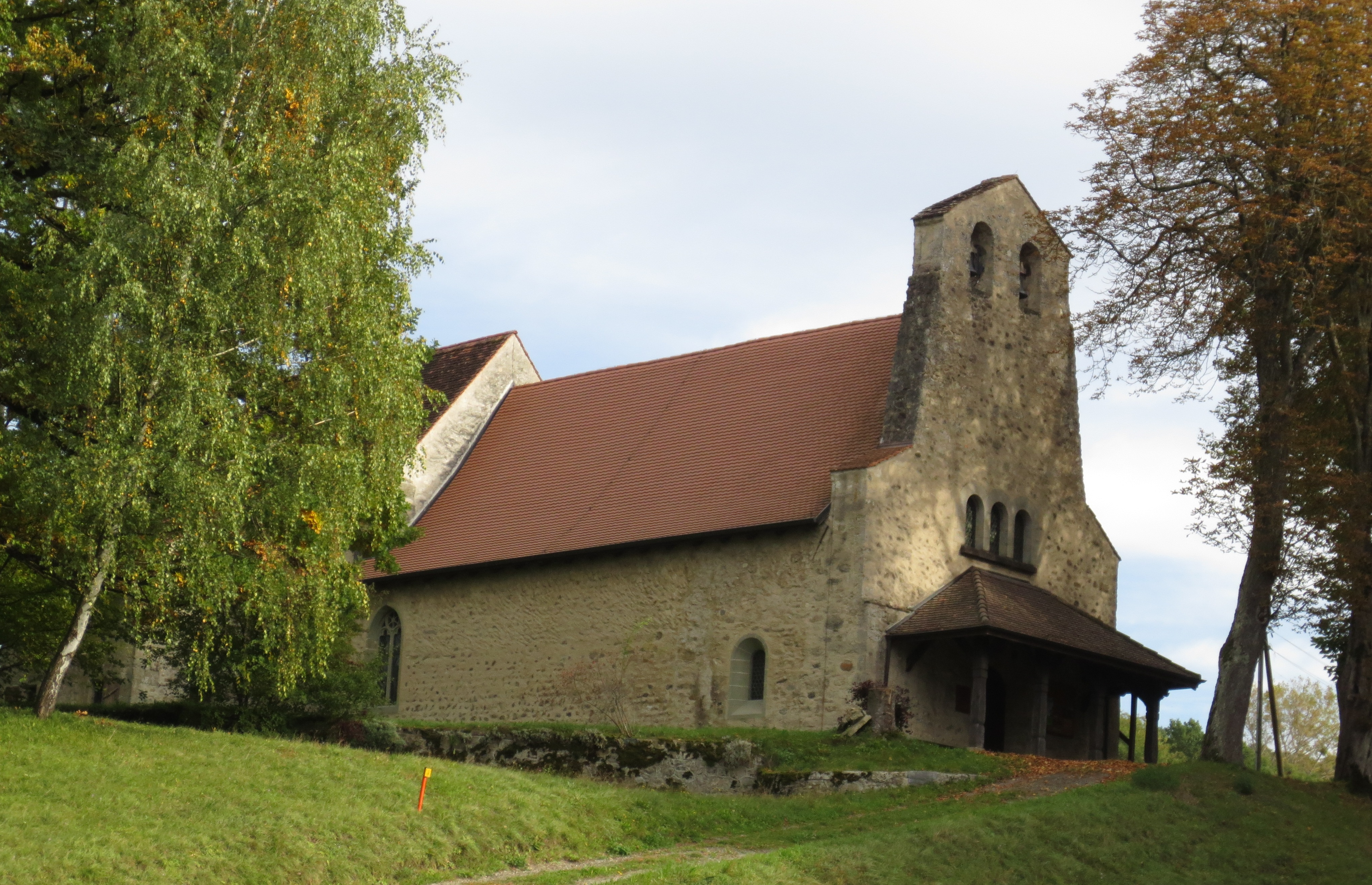

- Flag Coat of arms
- Location of Curtilles
- Location within Switzerland Location within Canton of Vaud
- Coordinates: 46°42′N 6°51′E
- Country: Switzerland
- Canton: Vaud
- District: Broye-Vully

Government
  - Mayor: Syndic

Area
  - Total: 4.95 km^{2} (1.91 sq mi)
- Elevation: 516 m (1,693 ft)

Population (2003)
  - Total: 282
  - Density: 57.0/km^{2} (148/sq mi)
- Time zone: UTC+01:00 (CET)
  - Summer (DST): UTC+02:00 (CEST)
- Postal code: 1521
- SFOS number: 5669
- ISO 3166 code: CH-VD
- Surrounded by: Chesalles-sur-Moudon, Dompierre, Lovatens, Lucens, Moudon, Sarzens, Seigneux
- Website: www.curtilles.ch

Curtilles (French pronunciation: [kyʁtij]) is a municipality in the district Broye-Vully in the canton of Vaud in Switzerland.

== History ==
Curtilles is first mentioned around 852-875 as Curtilia.

== Geography ==
Aerial view (1964)

Curtilles has an area, as of 2009, of 4.95 square kilometers (1.91 sq mi). Of this area, 3.86 km^{2} (1.49 sq mi) or 78.0% is used for agricultural purposes, while 0.77 km^{2} (0.30 sq mi) or 15.6% is forested. Of the rest of the land, 0.31 km^{2} (0.12 sq mi) or 6.3% is settled (buildings or roads), 0.03 km^{2} (7.4 acres) or 0.6% is either rivers or lakes and 0.01 km^{2} (2.5 acres) or 0.2% is unproductive land.

Of the built up area, housing and buildings made up 2.4% and transportation infrastructure made up 3.8%. Out of the forested land, 13.7% of the total land area is heavily forested and 1.8% is covered with orchards or small clusters of trees. Of the agricultural land, 57.8% is used for growing crops and 18.0% is pastures, while 2.2% is used for orchards or vine crops. All the water in the municipality is flowing water.

The municipality was part of the Moudon District until it was dissolved on 31 August 2006, and Curtilles became part of the new district of Broye-Vully.

The municipality is located in the Moudon, am rechten Ufer der Broye district, Die Gem. umfasst das Dorf und vier Weiler.. It consists of the village of Curtilles and the hamlets of Bez. Moudon, am rechten Ufer der Broye. Die Gem. umfasst das Dorf und vier Weiler..

== Coat of arms ==
The blazon of the municipal coat of arms is Azure, three Rakes two and one Argent handled Or.

== Demographics ==
Curtilles has a population (as of December 2020) of 300. As of 2008, 8.1% of the population are resident foreign nationals. Over the last 10 years (1999–2009) the population has changed at a rate of 1.7%. It has changed at a rate of 2.7% due to migration and at a rate of 0% due to births and deaths.

Most of the population (as of 2000) speaks French (261 or 94.2%), with German being second most common (12 or 4.3%) and Portuguese being third (2 or 0.7%). There is 1 person who speaks Italian.

Of the population in the municipality 97 or about 35.0% were born in Curtilles and lived there in 2000. There were 108 or 39.0% who were born in the same canton, while 36 or 13.0% were born somewhere else in Switzerland, and 29 or 10.5% were born outside of Switzerland.

In 2008 there were 7 live births to Swiss citizens and were 4 deaths of Swiss citizens. Ignoring immigration and emigration, the population of Swiss citizens increased by 3 while the foreign population remained the same. There was 1 non-Swiss man and 1 non-Swiss woman who immigrated from another country to Switzerland. The total Swiss population change in 2008 (from all sources, including moves across municipal borders) was an increase of 10 and the non-Swiss population increased by 8 people. This represents a population growth rate of 6.2%.

The age distribution, as of 2009, in Curtilles is; 38 children or 12.5% of the population are between 0 and 9 years old and 45 teenagers or 14.8% are between 10 and 19. Of the adult population, 26 people or 8.5% of the population are between 20 and 29 years old. 40 people or 13.1% are between 30 and 39, 42 people or 13.8% are between 40 and 49, and 44 people or 14.4% are between 50 and 59. The senior population distribution is 33 people or 10.8% of the population are between 60 and 69 years old, 18 people or 5.9% are between 70 and 79, there are 17 people or 5.6% who are between 80 and 89, and there are 2 people or 0.7% who are 90 and older.

As of 2000, there were 102 people who were single and never married in the municipality. There were 148 married individuals, 18 widows or widowers and 9 individuals who are divorced.

As of 2000, there were 110 private households in the municipality, and an average of 2.4 persons per household. There were 33 households that consist of only one person and 9 households with five or more people. Out of a total of 117 households that answered this question, 28.2% were households made up of just one person. Of the rest of the households, there are 39 married couples without children, 31 married couples with children There were 6 single parents with a child or children. There was 1 household that was made up of unrelated people and 7 households that were made up of some sort of institution or another collective housing.

In 2000 there were 48 single family homes (or 53.3% of the total) out of a total of 90 inhabited buildings. There were 14 multi-family buildings (15.6%), along with 26 multi-purpose buildings that were mostly used for housing (28.9%) and 2 other use buildings (commercial or industrial) that also had some housing (2.2%). Of the single family homes 19 were built before 1919, while 4 were built between 1990 and 2000. The most multi-family homes (10) were built before 1919 and the next most (2) were built between 1981 and 1990.

In 2000 there were 122 apartments in the municipality. The most common apartment size was 3 rooms of which there were 33. There were 3 single room apartments and 50 apartments with five or more rooms. Of these apartments, a total of 106 apartments (86.9% of the total) were permanently occupied, while 12 apartments (9.8%) were seasonally occupied and 4 apartments (3.3%) were empty. As of 2009, the construction rate of new housing units was 3.3 new units per 1000 residents. The vacancy rate for the municipality, in 2010, was 0.75%.

The historical population is given in the following chart:

== Heritage sites of national significance ==
Curtilles Castle is listed as a Swiss heritage site of national significance.

== Politics ==
In the 2007 federal election the most popular party was the SVP which received 28.19% of the vote. The next three most popular parties were the FDP (22.79%), the SP (17.81%) and the Green Party (15.66%). In the federal election, a total of 95 votes were cast, and the voter turnout was 47.3%.

== Economy ==
As of 2010, Curtilles had an unemployment rate of 3.5%. As of 2008, there were 36 people employed in the primary economic sector and about 13 businesses involved in this sector. 11 people were employed in the secondary sector and there were 4 businesses in this sector. 14 people were employed in the tertiary sector, with 5 businesses in this sector. There were 124 residents of the municipality who were employed in some capacity, of which females made up 37.1% of the workforce.

In 2008 the total number of full-time equivalent jobs was 44. The number of jobs in the primary sector was 23, all of which were in agriculture. The number of jobs in the secondary sector was 11, all of which were in construction. The number of jobs in the tertiary sector was 10. In the tertiary sector; 2 or 20.0% were in wholesale or retail sales or the repair of motor vehicles, 4 or 40.0% were in a hotel or restaurant, 2 or 20.0% were the insurance or financial industry, 1 was a technical professional or scientist.

In 2000, there were 10 workers who commuted into the municipality and 79 workers who commuted away. The municipality is a net exporter of workers, with about 7.9 workers leaving the municipality for every one entering. Of the working population, 8.9% used public transportation to get to work, and 54% used a private car.

== Religion ==
From the 2000 census, 42 or 15.2% were Roman Catholic, while 189 or 68.2% belonged to the Swiss Reformed Church. Of the rest of the population, and there were 10 individuals (or about 3.61% of the population) who belonged to another Christian church. There was 1 individual who was Jewish, and 2 (or about 0.72% of the population) who were Islamic. There were 2 individuals who were Buddhist. 30 (or about 10.83% of the population) belonged to no church, are agnostic or atheist, and 1 individuals (or about 0.36% of the population) did not answer the question.

== Education ==
In Curtilles about 93 or (33.6%) of the population have completed non-mandatory upper secondary education, and 33 or (11.9%) have completed additional higher education (either university or a Fachhochschule). Of the 33 who completed tertiary schooling, 66.7% were Swiss men, 21.2% were Swiss women.

In the 2009/2010 school year there were a total of 44 students in the Curtilles school district. In the Vaud cantonal school system, two years of non-obligatory pre-school are provided by the political districts. During the school year, the political district provided pre-school care for a total of 155 children of which 83 children (53.5%) received subsidized pre-school care. The canton's primary school program requires students to attend for four years. There were 22 students in the municipal primary school program. The obligatory lower secondary school program lasts for six years and there were 20 students in those schools. There were also 2 students who were home schooled or attended another non-traditional school.

As of 2000, there were 50 students from Curtilles who attended schools outside the municipality.
