= Sarzens =

- Former municipality
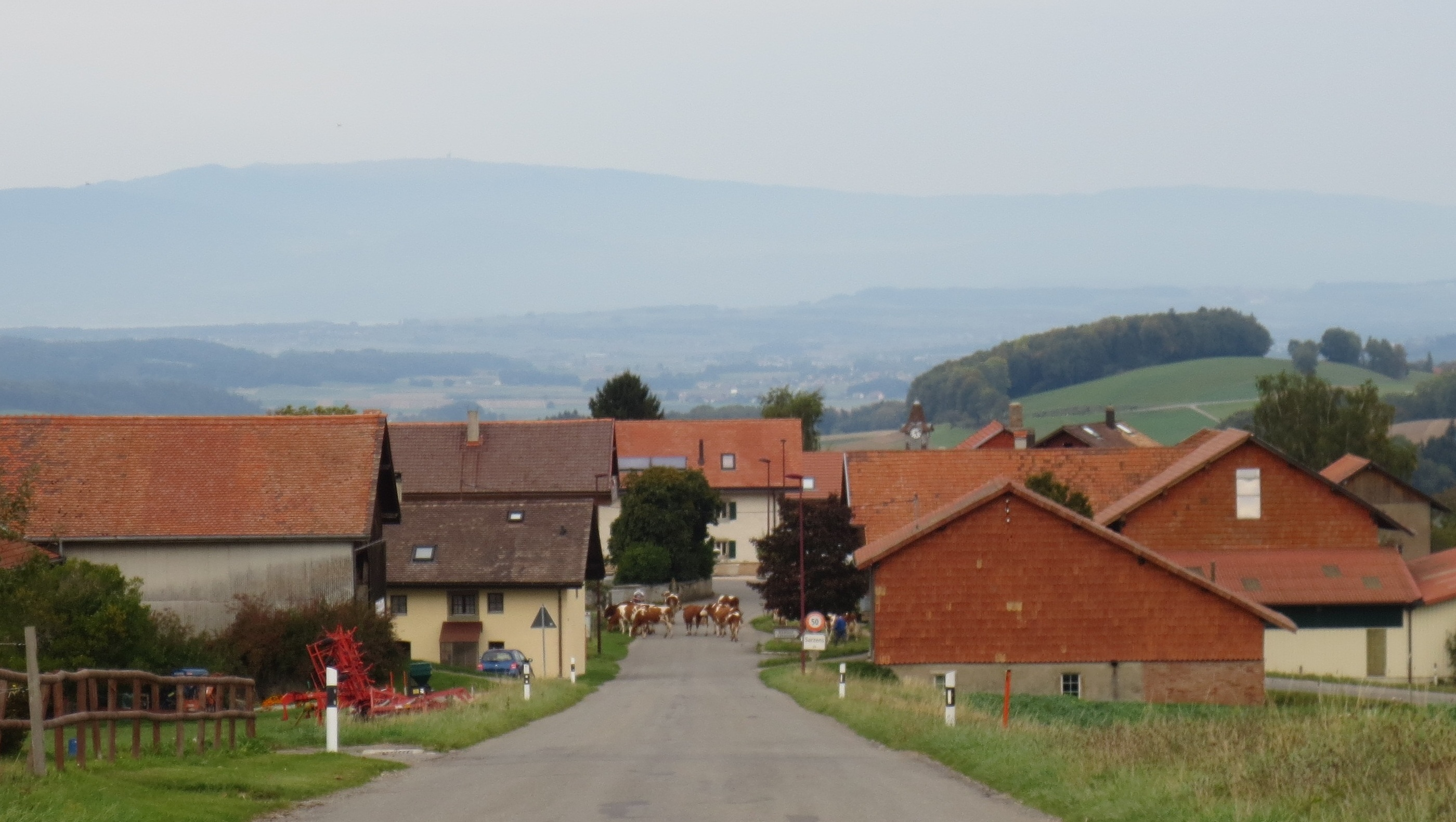

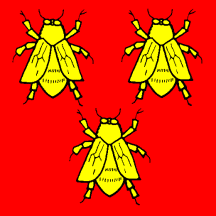
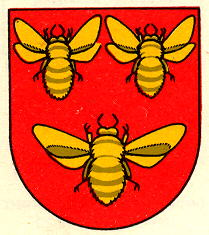
- Flag Coat of arms
- Location of Sarzens
- Location within Switzerland Location within Canton of Vaud
- Coordinates: 46°41′N 6°51′E
- Country: Switzerland
- Canton: Vaud
- District: Broye-Vully

Government
  - Mayor: Syndic

Area
  - Total: 1.45 km^{2} (0.56 sq mi)
- Elevation: 719 m (2,359 ft)

Population (2015)
  - Total: 50
  - Density: 34/km^{2} (89/sq mi)
- Time zone: UTC+01:00 (CET)
  - Summer (DST): UTC+02:00 (CEST)
- Postal code: 1683
- SFOS number: 5686
- ISO 3166 code: CH-VD
- Surrounded by: Brenles, Chesalles-sur-Moudon, Curtilles, Lovatens
- Website: www.lucens.ch

Sarzens is a former municipality in the district Broye-Vully in the canton of Vaud in Switzerland. In 2017 the former municipalities of Sarzens, Brenles, Chesalles-sur-Moudon, Cremin, Forel-sur-Lucens merged into the municipality of Lucens.

== History ==
Sarzens is first mentioned around 996-1017 as villa sarningis. In 1261 it was mentioned as Sarsens.

== Geography ==
Sarzens had an area, as of 2009, of 1.4 square kilometers (0.54 mi^{2}). Of this area, 1.1 km^{2} (0.42 mi^{2}) or 76.4% is used for agricultural purposes, while 0.22 km^{2} (0.085 mi^{2}) or 15.3% is forested. Of the rest of the land, 0.13 km^{2} (32 acres) or 9.0% is settled (buildings or roads).

Of the built up area, housing and buildings made up 3.5% and transportation infrastructure made up 4.9%. Out of the forested land, all of the forested land area is covered with heavy forests. Of the agricultural land, 61.8% is used for growing crops and 13.2% is pastures, while 1.4% is used for orchards or vine crops.

The former municipality was part of the Moudon District until it was dissolved on 31 August 2006, and Sarzens became part of the new district of Broye-Vully.

The former municipality is located in the heights above the Broye valley, between Moudon and Lucens.

== Coat of arms ==
The blazon of the municipal coat of arms is Gules, three Bees Or two and one.

== Demographics ==
Sarzens had a population (as of 2015) of 80. As of 2008, 11.8% of the population are resident foreign nationals. Over the last 10 years (1999–2009) the population has changed at a rate of 26.6%. It has changed at a rate of 32.8% due to migration and at a rate of 6.3% due to births and deaths.

Most of the population (as of 2000) speaks French (57 or 95.0%), with Portuguese being second most common (2 or 3.3%) and German being third (1 or 1.7%).

Of the population in the municipality 21 or about 35.0% were born in Sarzens and lived there in 2000. There were 27 or 45.0% who were born in the same canton, while 7 or 11.7% were born somewhere else in Switzerland, and 5 or 8.3% were born outside of Switzerland.

In 2008 there were no live births to Swiss citizens. Ignoring immigration and emigration, the population of Swiss citizens remained the same while the foreign population remained the same. The total Swiss population change in 2008 (from all sources, including moves across municipal borders) was an increase of 5 and the non-Swiss population increased by 1 people. This represents a population growth rate of 8.6%.

The age distribution, as of 2009, in Sarzens is; 12 children or 14.8% of the population are between 0 and 9 years old and 14 teenagers or 17.3% are between 10 and 19. Of the adult population, 3 people or 3.7% of the population are between 20 and 29 years old. 11 people or 13.6% are between 30 and 39, 17 people or 21.0% are between 40 and 49, and 9 people or 11.1% are between 50 and 59. The senior population distribution is 5 people or 6.2% of the population are between 60 and 69 years old, 9 people or 11.1% are between 70 and 79, there is 1 person who is 80 and 89.

As of 2000, there were 22 people who were single and never married in the municipality. There were 32 married individuals, 3 widows or widowers and 3 individuals who are divorced.

As of 2000, there were 27 private households in the municipality, and an average of 2.2 persons per household. There were 9 households that consist of only one person and 1 households with five or more people. Out of a total of 27 households that answered this question, 33.3% were households made up of just one person. Of the rest of the households, there are 9 married couples without children, 7 married couples with children There were 2 single parents with a child or children.

In 2000 there were 15 single family homes (or 62.5% of the total) out of a total of 24 inhabited buildings. There were 2 multi-family buildings (8.3%), along with 5 multi-purpose buildings that were mostly used for housing (20.8%) and 2 other use buildings (commercial or industrial) that also had some housing (8.3%). Of the single family homes 10 were built before 1919, while 3 were built between 1990 and 2000. The greatest number of multi-family homes (1) were built before 1919 and again between 1981 and 1990

In 2000 there were 30 apartments in the municipality. The most common apartment size was 3 rooms of which there were 9. There were single room apartments and 11 apartments with five or more rooms. Of these apartments, a total of 26 apartments (86.7% of the total) were permanently occupied, while 3 apartments (10.0%) were seasonally occupied and one apartment was empty. As of 2009, the construction rate of new housing units was 0 new units per 1000 residents. The vacancy rate for the municipality, in 2010, was 0%.

The historical population is given in the following chart:

== Politics ==
In the 2007 federal election the most popular party was the SVP which received 56.82% of the vote. The next three most popular parties were the Green Party (18.18%), the SP (13.26%) and the Sol. Party (4.55%). In the federal election, a total of 30 votes were cast, and the voter turnout was 65.2%.

== Economy ==
As of 2010, Sarzens had an unemployment rate of 4.9%. As of 2008, there were 16 people employed in the primary economic sector and about 5 businesses involved in this sector. No one was employed in the secondary sector. 8 people were employed in the tertiary sector, with 2 businesses in this sector. There were 31 residents of the municipality who were employed in some capacity, of which females made up 41.9% of the workforce.

In 2008 the total number of full-time equivalent jobs was 18. The number of jobs in the primary sector was 12, all of which were in agriculture. There were no jobs in the secondary sector. The number of jobs in the tertiary sector was 6. In the tertiary sector; 4 or 66.7% were in the movement and storage of goods.

In 2000, there were 19 workers who commuted away from the municipality. Of the working population, 0% used public transportation to get to work, and 64.5% used a private car.

== Religion ==
From the 2000 census, 9 or 15.0% were Roman Catholic, while 40 or 66.7% belonged to the Swiss Reformed Church. Of the rest of the population, there were 13 individuals (or about 21.67% of the population) who belonged to another Christian church. There was 1 person who was Buddhist. 3 (or about 5.00% of the population) belonged to no church, are agnostic or atheist.

== Education ==
In Sarzens about 25 or (41.7%) of the population have completed non-mandatory upper secondary education, and 10 or (16.7%) have completed additional higher education (either university or a Fachhochschule). Of the 10 who completed tertiary schooling, 50.0% were Swiss men, 30.0% were Swiss women.

In the 2009/2010 school year there were a total of 10 students in the Sarzens school district. In the Vaud cantonal school system, two years of non-obligatory pre-school are provided by the political districts. During the school year, the political district provided pre-school care for a total of 155 children of which 83 children (53.5%) received subsidized pre-school care. The canton's primary school program requires students to attend for four years. There were 4 students in the municipal primary school program. The obligatory lower secondary school program lasts for six years and there were 6 students in those schools.

As of 2000, there were 12 students from Sarzens who attended schools outside the municipality.
