= Billens-Hennens =

- Municipality
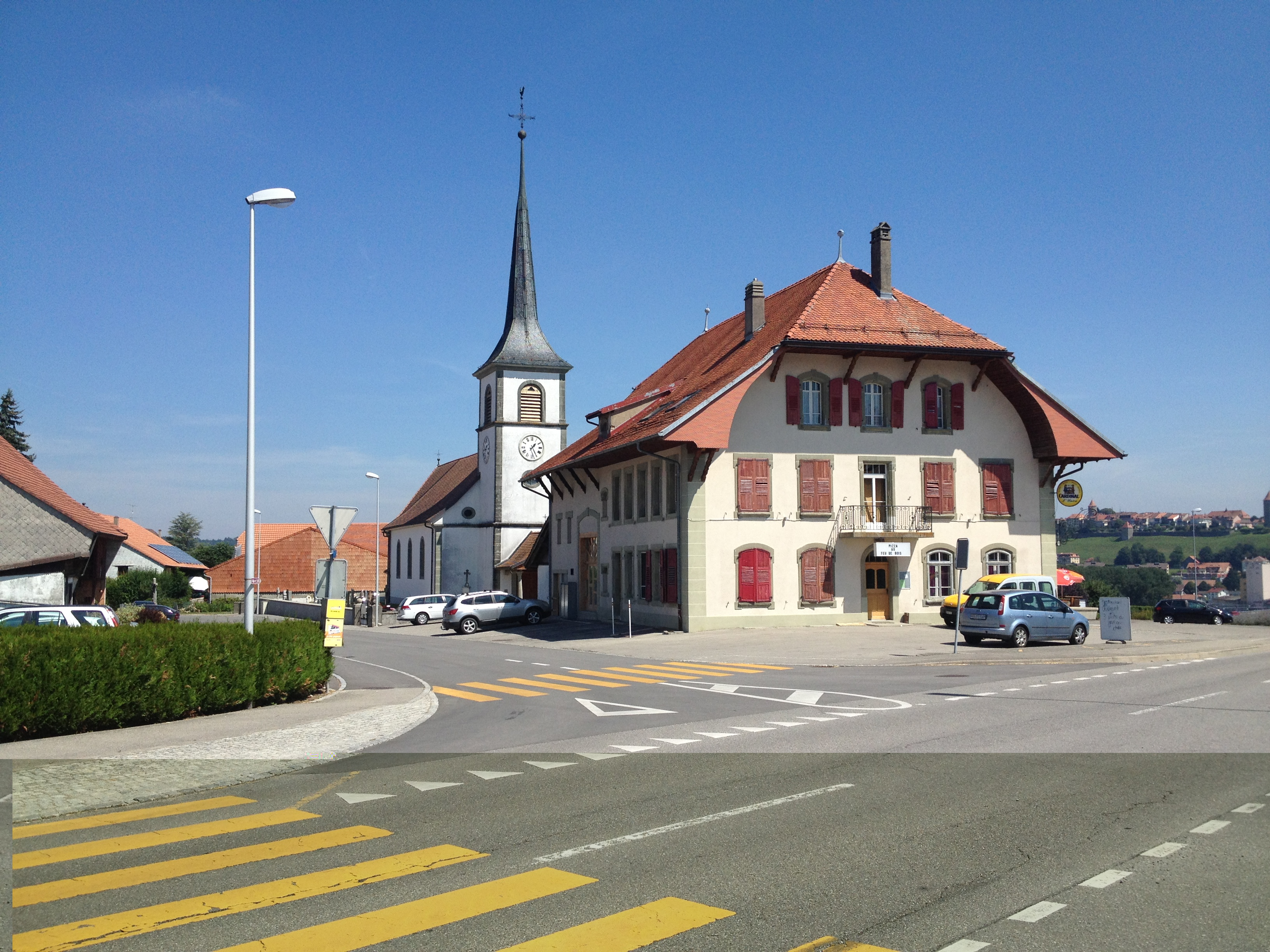
- Billens

- Flag Coat of arms
- Location of Billens-Hennens
- Location within Switzerland Location within Canton of Fribourg
- Coordinates: 46°41′N 6°54′E
- Country: Switzerland
- Canton: Fribourg
- District: Glâne

Government
  - Mayor: Syndic

Area
  - Total: 4.89 km^{2} (1.89 sq mi)
- Elevation: 738 m (2,421 ft)

Population (December 2020)
  - Total: 791
  - Density: 162/km^{2} (419/sq mi)
- Time zone: UTC+01:00 (CET)
  - Summer (DST): UTC+02:00 (CEST)
- Postal code: 1681
- SFOS number: 2063
- ISO 3166 code: CH-FR
- Surrounded by: Brenles (VD), Lovatens (VD), Prévonloup (VD), Romont, Siviriez
- Website: www.billens-hennens.ch

Billens-Hennens is a municipality in the district of Glâne in the canton of Fribourg in Switzerland. It was formed from the union on January 1, 1998, of the municipalities of Billens (Arpitan: Belens, locally Belin [bəˈlɛ̃]) and Hennens (Arpitan: Henens, locally Enin [ɛˈnɛ̃] or Innin).

== Geography ==
Aerial view (1964)

Billens-Hennens has an area, as of 2009, of 4.9 square kilometers (1.9 mi^{2}). Of this area, 3.94 km^{2} (1.52 mi^{2}) or 80.9% is used for agricultural purposes, while 0.64 km^{2} (0.25 mi^{2}) or 13.1% is forested. Of the rest of the land, 0.32 km^{2} (0.12 mi^{2}) or 6.6% is settled (buildings or roads).

Of the built up area, housing and buildings made up 4.5% and transportation infrastructure made up 1.6%. Out of the forested land, all of the forested land area is covered with heavy forest. Of the agricultural land, 51.5% is used for growing crops and 29.0% is pastures.

== Coat of arms ==
The blazon of the municipal coat of arms is Gules on a Bend Sable cotized Or three Mullets of Five pointing to base sinister.

== Demographics ==
Billens-Hennens has a population (as of December 2020) of 791. As of 2008, 8.5% of the population are resident foreign nationals. Over the last 10 years (2000–2010) the population has changed at a rate of 28.4%. Migration accounted for 16.9%, while births and deaths accounted for -0.6%.

Most of the population (as of 2000) speaks French (599 or 96.5%) as their first language, German is the second most common (15 or 2.4%) and Spanish is the third (3 or 0.5%). and 1 person who speaks Romansh.

As of 2008, the population was 48.4% male and 51.6% female. The population was made up of 313 Swiss men (45.0% of the population) and 24 (3.4%) non-Swiss men. There were 337 Swiss women (48.4%) and 22 (3.2%) non-Swiss women. Of the population in the municipality, 197 or about 31.7% were born in Billens-Hennens and lived there in 2000. There were 245 or 39.5% who were born in the same canton, while 86 or 13.8% were born somewhere else in Switzerland, and 42 or 6.8% were born outside of Switzerland.

The age distribution, as of 2000, in Billens-Hennens is; 77 children or 12.4% of the population are between 0 and 9 years old and 78 teenagers or 12.6% are between 10 and 19. Of the adult population, 62 people or 10.0% of the population are between 20 and 29 years old. 89 people or 14.3% are between 30 and 39, 83 people or 13.4% are between 40 and 49, and 56 people or 9.0% are between 50 and 59. The senior population distribution is 49 people or 7.9% of the population are between 60 and 69 years old, 56 people or 9.0% are between 70 and 79, there are 58 people or 9.3% who are between 80 and 89, and there are 13 people or 2.1% who are 90 and older.

As of 2000, there were 263 people who were single and never married in the municipality. There were 267 married individuals, 69 widows or widowers and 22 individuals who are divorced.

As of 2000, there were 195 private households in the municipality, and an average of 2.8 persons per household. There were 40 households that consist of only one person and 25 households with five or more people. In 2000, a total of 187 apartments (89.0% of the total) were permanently occupied, while 12 apartments (5.7%) were seasonally occupied and 11 apartments (5.2%) were empty. As of 2009, the construction rate of new housing units was 10.6 new units per 1000 residents. The vacancy rate for the municipality, in 2010, was 1.19%.

The historical population is given in the following chart:

== Politics ==
In the 2011 federal election the most popular party was the SVP which received 30.1% of the vote. The next three most popular parties were the CVP (23.9%), the SP (23.3%) and the FDP (8.5%).

The SVP received about the same percentage of the vote as they did in the 2007 Federal election (29.7% in 2007 vs 30.1% in 2011). The CVP moved from third in 2007 (with 21.6%) to second in 2011, the SPS moved from second in 2007 (with 24.5%) to third and the FDP lost popularity (17.7% in 2007). A total of 208 votes were cast in this election, of which 3 or 1.4% were invalid.

== Economy ==
As of 2010, Billens-Hennens had an unemployment rate of 3.1%. As of 2008, there were 34 people employed in the primary economic sector and about 14 businesses involved in this sector. 11 people were employed in the secondary sector and there were 3 businesses in this sector. 97 people were employed in the tertiary sector, with 17 businesses in this sector. There were 266 residents of the municipality who were employed in some capacity, of which females made up 40.6% of the workforce.

In 2008 the total number of full-time equivalent jobs was 113. The number of jobs in the primary sector was 28, all of which were in agriculture. The number of jobs in the secondary sector was 10 of which 5 were in manufacturing and 5 were in construction. The number of jobs in the tertiary sector was 75. In the tertiary sector; 10 or 13.3% were in wholesale or retail sales or the repair of motor vehicles, 4 or 5.3% were in the movement and storage of goods, 3 or 4.0% were in a hotel or restaurant, 5 or 6.7% were in the information industry, 2 or 2.7% were technical professionals or scientists, 4 or 5.3% were in education and 47 or 62.7% were in health care.

In 2000, there were 313 workers who commuted into the municipality and 168 workers who commuted away. The municipality is a net importer of workers, with about 1.9 workers entering the municipality for every one leaving. Of the working population, 6.4% used public transportation to get to work, and 66.9% used a private car.

== Religion ==
From the 2000 census, 502 or 80.8% were Roman Catholic, while 43 or 6.9% belonged to the Swiss Reformed Church. There were 7 (or about 1.13% of the population) who were Islamic. 33 (or about 5.31% of the population) belonged to no church, are agnostic or atheist, and 36 individuals (or about 5.80% of the population) did not answer the question.

== Education ==
In Billens-Hennens about 160 or (25.8%) of the population have completed non-mandatory upper secondary education, and 54 or (8.7%) have completed additional higher education (either university or a Fachhochschule). Of the 54 who completed tertiary schooling, 55.6% were Swiss men, 27.8% were Swiss women, 11.1% were non-Swiss men.

The Canton of Fribourg school system provides one year of non-obligatory Kindergarten, followed by six years of Primary school. This is followed by three years of obligatory lower Secondary school where the students are separated according to ability and aptitude. Following the lower Secondary students may attend a three or four year optional upper Secondary school. The upper Secondary school is divided into gymnasium (university preparatory) and vocational programs. After they finish the upper Secondary program, students may choose to attend a Tertiary school or continue their apprenticeship.

During the 2010–11 school year, there were a total of 51 students attending 3 classes in Billens-Hennens. A total of 143 students from the municipality attended any school, either in the municipality or outside of it. There were no kindergarten classes in the municipality, but 13 students attended kindergarten in a neighboring municipality. The municipality had 3 primary classes and 51 students. During the same year, there were no lower secondary classes in the municipality, but 36 students attended lower secondary school in a neighboring municipality. There were no upper Secondary classes or vocational classes, but there were 12 upper Secondary students and 27 upper Secondary vocational students who attended classes in another municipality. The municipality had no non-university Tertiary classes, but there was one non-university Tertiary student and 3 specialized Tertiary students who attended classes in another municipality.

As of 2000, there were 4 students in Billens-Hennens who came from another municipality, while 51 residents attended schools outside the municipality.
