= Prévonloup =

- Municipality
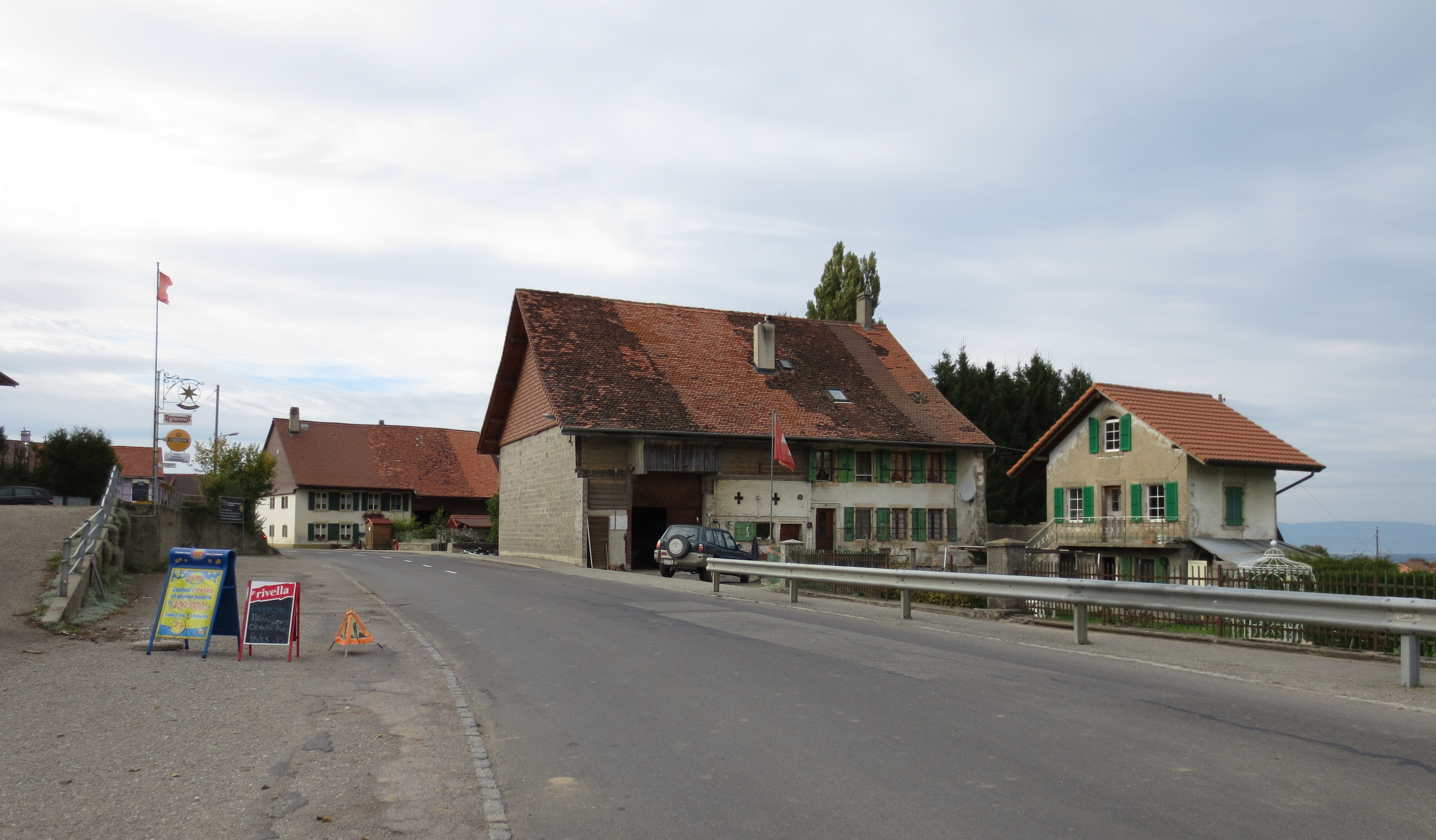

- Flag Coat of arms
- Location of Prévonloup
- Location within Switzerland Location within Canton of Vaud
- Coordinates: 46°42′N 6°53′E
- Country: Switzerland
- Canton: Vaud
- District: Broye-Vully

Government
  - Mayor: Syndic

Area
  - Total: 1.84 km^{2} (0.71 sq mi)
- Elevation: 746 m (2,448 ft)

Population (2003)
  - Total: 122
  - Density: 66.3/km^{2} (172/sq mi)
- Time zone: UTC+01:00 (CET)
  - Summer (DST): UTC+02:00 (CEST)
- Postal code: 1682
- SFOS number: 5683
- ISO 3166 code: CH-VD
- Surrounded by: Billens-Hennens (FR), Dompierre, Lovatens, Romont (FR)
- Website: www.prevonloup.ch

Prévonloup (French pronunciation: [pʁevɔ̃lu]) is a municipality in the district of Broye-Vully in the canton of Vaud in Switzerland.

== History ==
Prévonloup is first mentioned in 1336 as Provalour. In 1340 it was mentioned as Provonlou and in 1440 as Prévondloup.

== Geography ==
Prévonloup has an area, as of 2009, of 1.84 square kilometers (0.71 sq mi). Of this area, 1.46 km^{2} (0.56 sq mi) or 79.3% is used for agricultural purposes, while 0.22 km^{2} (0.085 sq mi) or 12.0% is forested. Of the rest of the land, 0.14 km^{2} (35 acres) or 7.6% is settled (buildings or roads).

Of the built up area, housing and buildings made up 4.3% and transportation infrastructure made up 2.2%. Power and water infrastructure as well as other special developed areas made up 1.1% of the area Out of the forested land, 10.9% of the total land area is heavily forested and 1.1% is covered with orchards or small clusters of trees. Of the agricultural land, 72.3% is used for growing crops and 6.0% is pastures, while 1.1% is used for orchards or vine crops.

The municipality was part of the Moudon District until it was dissolved on 31 August 2006, and Prévonloup became part of the new district of Broye-Vully.

The municipality is located on the right bank of the Broye between Lucens and Romont (in the Canton of Fribourg).

== Coat of arms ==
The blazon of the municipal coat of arms is Per bend Argent and Gules, overall two pyxes counterchanged.

== Demographics ==
Prévonloup has a population (as of December 2020) of 202. As of 2008, 7.9% of the population are resident foreign nationals. Over the last 10 years (1999–2009) the population has changed at a rate of 11.8%. It has changed at a rate of 8.7% due to migration and at a rate of 3.9% due to births and deaths.

Most of the population (as of 2000) speaks French (104 or 91.2%), with German being second most common (9 or 7.9%) and Albanian being third (1 or 0.9%).

Of the population in the municipality 41 or about 36.0% were born in Prévonloup and lived there in 2000. There were 37 or 32.5% who were born in the same canton, while 30 or 26.3% were born somewhere else in Switzerland, and 6 or 5.3% were born outside of Switzerland.

In 2008 there were 2 live births to Swiss citizens and were 3 deaths of Swiss citizens. Ignoring immigration and emigration, the population of Swiss citizens decreased by 1 while the foreign population remained the same. There was 1 non-Swiss man who immigrated from another country to Switzerland. The total Swiss population change in 2008 (from all sources, including moves across municipal borders) was an increase of 6 and the non-Swiss population decreased by 1 people. This represents a population growth rate of 3.7%.

The age distribution, as of 2009, in Prévonloup is; 17 children or 12.0% of the population are between 0 and 9 years old and 22 teenagers or 15.5% are between 10 and 19. Of the adult population, 17 people or 12.0% of the population are between 20 and 29 years old. 17 people or 12.0% are between 30 and 39, 13 people or 9.2% are between 40 and 49, and 17 people or 12.0% are between 50 and 59. The senior population distribution is 17 people or 12.0% of the population are between 60 and 69 years old, 13 people or 9.2% are between 70 and 79, there are 9 people or 6.3% who are between 80 and 89.

As of 2000, there were 27 people who were single and never married in the municipality. There were 76 married individuals, 7 widows or widowers and 4 individuals who are divorced.

As of 2000, there were 51 private households in the municipality, and an average of 2.2 persons per household. There were 11 households that consist of only one person and 2 households with five or more people. Out of a total of 51 households that answered this question, 21.6% were households made up of just one person and there were 2 adults who lived with their parents. Of the rest of the households, there are 27 married couples without children, 9 married couples with children There were 2 single parents with a child or children.

In 2000 there were 27 single family homes (or 58.7% of the total) out of a total of 46 inhabited buildings. There were 2 multi-family buildings (4.3%), along with 14 multi-purpose buildings that were mostly used for housing (30.4%) and 3 other use buildings (commercial or industrial) that also had some housing (6.5%). Of the single family homes 15 were built before 1919, while 1 was built between 1990 and 2000.

In 2000 there were 56 apartments in the municipality. The most common apartment size was 5 rooms of which there were 19. There were 1 single room apartments and 31 apartments with five or more rooms. Of these apartments, a total of 51 apartments (91.1% of the total) were permanently occupied, while 2 apartments (3.6%) were seasonally occupied and 3 apartments (5.4%) were empty. As of 2009, the construction rate of new housing units was 21.1 new units per 1000 residents. The vacancy rate for the municipality, in 2010, was 0%.

The historical population is given in the following chart:

== Politics ==
In the 2007 federal election the most popular party was the SVP which received 36.14% of the vote. The next three most popular parties were the FDP (28.5%), the SP (12.56%) and the PdA Party (7.64%). In the federal election, a total of 44 votes were cast, and the voter turnout was 46.3%.

== Economy ==
As of 2010, Prévonloup had an unemployment rate of 3.8%. As of 2008, there were 14 people employed in the primary economic sector and about 5 businesses involved in this sector. 8 people were employed in the secondary sector and there were 3 businesses in this sector. 15 people were employed in the tertiary sector, with 6 businesses in this sector. There were 48 residents of the municipality who were employed in some capacity, of which females made up 37.5% of the workforce.

In 2008 the total number of full-time equivalent jobs was 26. The number of jobs in the primary sector was 9, all of which were in agriculture. The number of jobs in the secondary sector was 7, all of which were in manufacturing. The number of jobs in the tertiary sector was 10. In the tertiary sector; 1 was in the sale or repair of motor vehicles, 2 or 20.0% were in the movement and storage of goods, 4 or 40.0% were in a hotel or restaurant.

In 2000, there were 27 workers who commuted away from the municipality. Of the working population, 8.3% used public transportation to get to work, and 54.2% used a private car.

== Religion ==
From the 2000 census, 22 or 19.3% were Roman Catholic, while 70 or 61.4% belonged to the Swiss Reformed Church. Of the rest of the population, there was 1 member of an Orthodox church, and there were 8 individuals (or about 7.02% of the population) who belonged to another Christian church. There was 1 individual who was Islamic. 12 (or about 10.53% of the population) belonged to no church, are agnostic or atheist.

== Education ==
In Prévonloup about 41 or (36.0%) of the population have completed non-mandatory upper secondary education, and 4 or (3.5%) have completed additional higher education (either university or a Fachhochschule). Of the 4 who completed tertiary schooling, 50.0% were Swiss men, 50.0% were Swiss women.

In the 2009/2010 school year there were a total of 24 students in the Prévonloup school district. In the Vaud cantonal school system, two years of non-obligatory pre-school are provided by the political districts. During the school year, the political district provided pre-school care for a total of 155 children of which 83 children (53.5%) received subsidized pre-school care. The canton's primary school program requires students to attend for four years. There were 16 students in the municipal primary school program. The obligatory lower secondary school program lasts for six years and there were 8 students in those schools.

As of 2000, there were 15 students from Prévonloup who attended schools outside the municipality.
