= Curtilles Castle =

Castle in Curtilles, Switzerland

- Château de Curtilles
- Curtilles in Switzerland
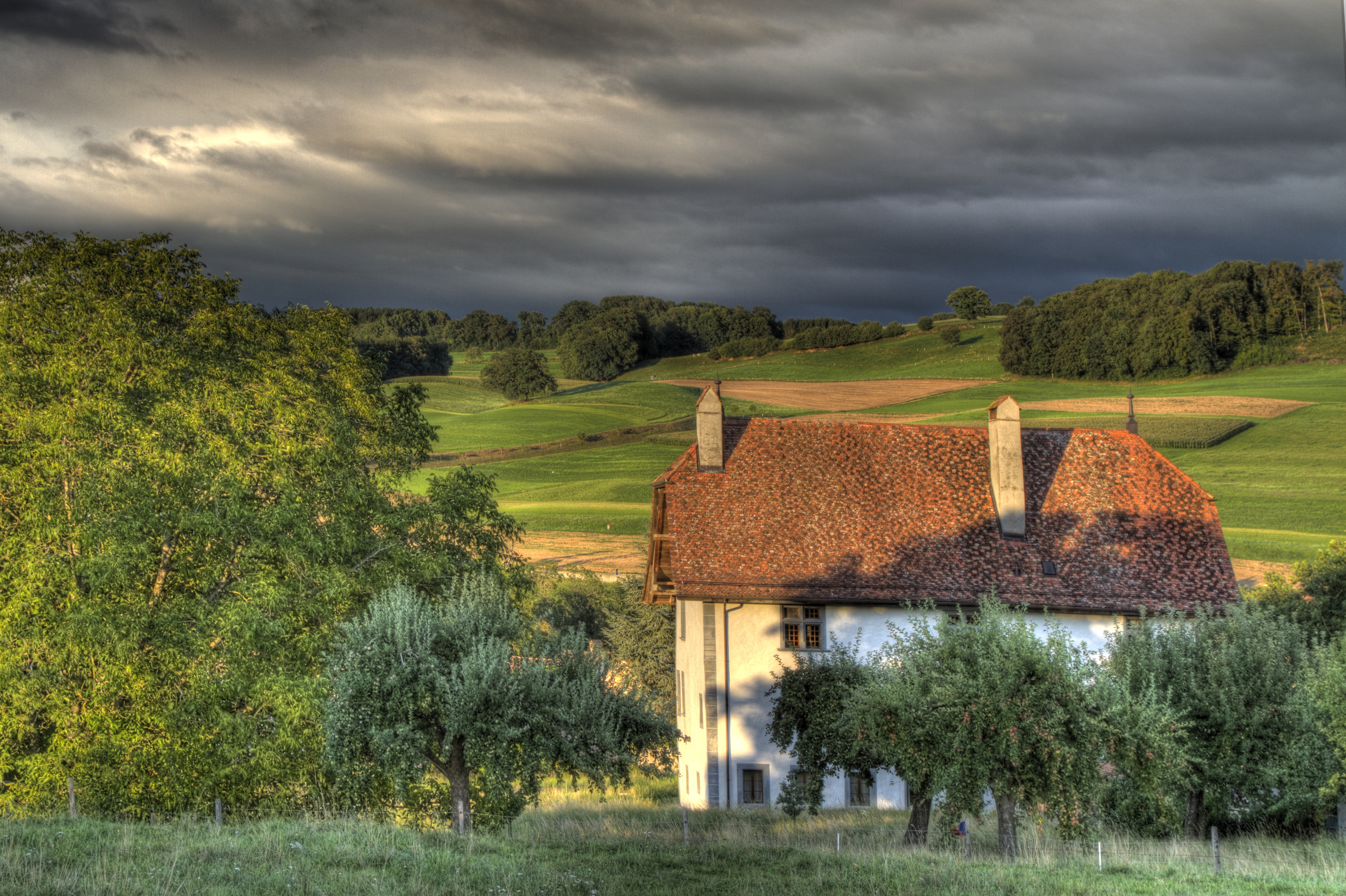
- Vue extérieure du château de Curtilles

Location
- Coordinates: 46°41′54″N 6°50′54″E

Site history
- Built: 1584
- Built by: François de Villarzel

Swiss Cultural Property of National Significance

Curtilles Castle is a castle in the municipality of Curtilles of the Canton of Vaud in Switzerland. It is a Swiss heritage site of national significance.

== See also ==
- List of castles in Switzerland
- Château
