= Brenles =

- Former municipality
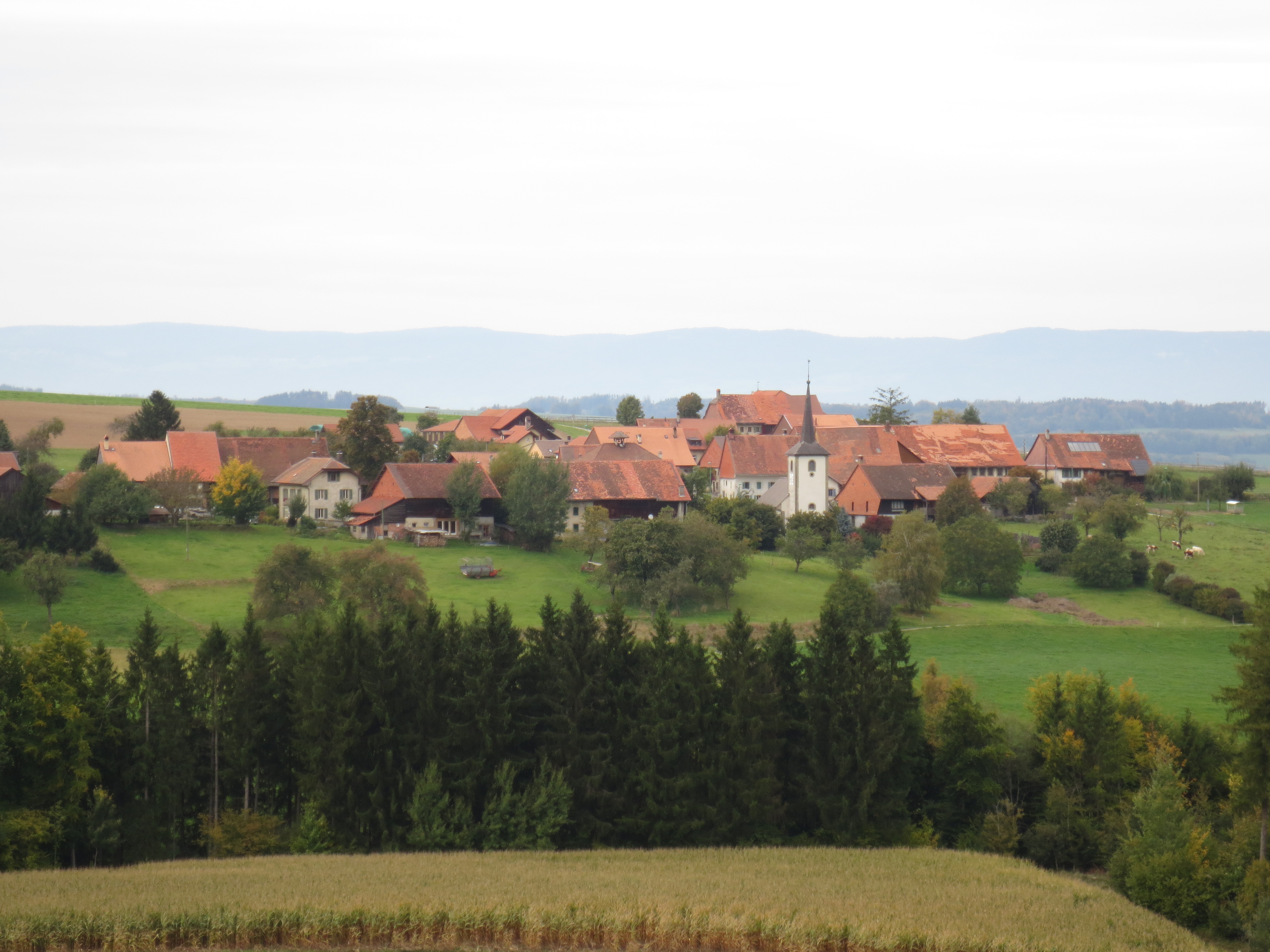

- Flag Coat of arms
- Location of Brenles
- Location within Switzerland Location within Canton of Vaud
- Coordinates: 46°40′N 6°51′E
- Country: Switzerland
- Canton: Vaud
- District: Broye-Vully

Government
  - Mayor: Syndic

Area
  - Total: 3.83 km^{2} (1.48 sq mi)
- Elevation: 765 m (2,510 ft)

Population (2003)
  - Total: 165
  - Density: 43.1/km^{2} (112/sq mi)
- Time zone: UTC+01:00 (CET)
  - Summer (DST): UTC+02:00 (CEST)
- Postal code: 1683
- SFOS number: 5662
- ISO 3166 code: CH-VD
- Surrounded by: Billens-Hennens (FR), Chavannes-sur-Moudon, Chesalles-sur-Moudon, Esmonts (FR), Lovatens, Sarzens, Siviriez (FR), Vuarmarens (FR)
- Website: lucens.ch

Brenles is a former municipality in the district Broye-Vully in the canton of Vaud in Switzerland. In 2017 the former municipalities of Brenles, Chesalles-sur-Moudon, Cremin, Forel-sur-Lucens and Sarzens merged into the municipality of Lucens.

== History ==
Brenles is first mentioned in 1247 as Brenles.

== Geography ==
Brenles had an area, as of 2009, of 3.83 square kilometers (1.48 sq mi). Of this area, 2.48 km^{2} (0.96 sq mi) or 64.8% is used for agricultural purposes, while 1.16 km^{2} (0.45 sq mi) or 30.3% is forested. Of the rest of the land, 0.15 km^{2} (37 acres) or 3.9% is settled (buildings or roads) and 0.02 km^{2} (4.9 acres) or 0.5% is unproductive land.

Of the built up area, housing and buildings made up 1.0% and transportation infrastructure made up 2.9%. Out of the forested land, 27.9% of the total land area is heavily forested and 2.3% is covered with orchards or small clusters of trees. Of the agricultural land, 43.3% is used for growing crops and 20.6% is pastures.

The former municipality was part of the Moudon District until it was dissolved on 31 August 2006, and Brenles became part of the new district of Broye-Vully. The municipality is located on the border with the Canton of Fribourg.

== Coat of arms ==
The blazon of the municipal coat of arms is Vert, a key Argent bendy.

== Demographics ==
Brenles had a population (as of 2015) of 144. As of 2008, 4.2% of the population are resident foreign nationals. Over the last 10 years (1999–2009 ) the population has changed at a rate of 4.5%. It has changed at a rate of 0% due to migration and at a rate of 3.8% due to births and deaths.

Most of the population (as of 2000) speaks French (149 or 91.4%), with German being second most common (10 or 6.1%) and Italian being third (2 or 1.2%).

Of the population in the municipality 68 or about 41.7% were born in Brenles and lived there in 2000. There were 42 or 25.8% who were born in the same canton, while 39 or 23.9% were born somewhere else in Switzerland, and 10 or 6.1% were born outside of Switzerland.

In 2008 there was 1 live birth to Swiss citizens. Ignoring immigration and emigration, the population of Swiss citizens increased by 1 while the foreign population remained the same. There was 1 non-Swiss woman who immigrated from another country to Switzerland. The total Swiss population change in 2008 (from all sources, including moves across municipal borders) was a decrease of 2 and the non-Swiss population increased by 2 people. This represents a population growth rate of 0.0%.

The age distribution, as of 2009, in Brenles is; 19 children or 11.6% of the population are between 0 and 9 years old and 29 teenagers or 17.7% are between 10 and 19. Of the adult population, 20 people or 12.2% of the population are between 20 and 29 years old. 12 people or 7.3% are between 30 and 39, 35 people or 21.3% are between 40 and 49, and 18 people or 11.0% are between 50 and 59. The senior population distribution is 14 people or 8.5% of the population are between 60 and 69 years old, 9 people or 5.5% are between 70 and 79, there are 8 people or 4.9% who are 80 and 89.

As of 2000, there were 70 people who were single and never married in the municipality. There were 84 married individuals, 5 widows or widowers and 4 individuals who are divorced.

As of 2000, there were 53 private households in the municipality, and an average of 3.0 persons per household. There were 9 households that consist of only one person and 9 households with five or more people. Out of a total of 55 households that answered this question, 16.4% were households made up of just one person and there was 1 adult who lived with their parents. Of the rest of the households, there are 15 married couples without children, 26 married couples with children There were 2 single parents with a child or children.

In 2000 there were 26 single family homes (or 49.1% of the total) out of a total of 53 inhabited buildings. There were 2 multi-family buildings (3.8%), along with 22 multi-purpose buildings that were mostly used for housing (41.5%) and 3 other use buildings (commercial or industrial) that also had some housing (5.7%). Of the single family homes 14 were built before 1919, while 2 were built between 1990 and 2000. The greatest number of multi-family homes (1) were built before 1919 and again between 1981 and 1990.

In 2000 there were 59 apartments in the municipality. The most common apartment size was 4 rooms of which there were 17. There were 2 single room apartments and 31 apartments with five or more rooms. Of these apartments, a total of 51 apartments (86.4% of the total) were permanently occupied, while 4 apartments (6.8%) were seasonally occupied and 4 apartments (6.8%) were empty. As of 2009, the construction rate of new housing units was 0 new units per 1000 residents. The vacancy rate for the municipality, in 2010, was 0%.

The historical population is given in the following chart:

== Politics ==
In the 2007 federal election the most popular party was the Green Party which received 35.03% of the vote. The next three most popular parties were the SVP (28.58%), the FDP (13.99%) and the SP (13.83%). In the federal election, a total of 70 votes were cast, and the voter turnout was 57.4%.

== Economy ==
As of 2010, Brenles had an unemployment rate of 1.4%. As of 2008, there were 23 people employed in the primary economic sector and about 8 businesses involved in this sector. 15 people were employed in the secondary sector and there were 3 businesses in this sector. 15 people were employed in the tertiary sector, with 4 businesses in this sector. There were 77 residents of the municipality who were employed in some capacity, of which females made up 45.5% of the workforce.

In 2008 the total number of full-time equivalent jobs was 42. The number of jobs in the primary sector was 17, all of which were in agriculture. The number of jobs in the secondary sector was 14, all of which were in manufacturing. The number of jobs in the tertiary sector was 11. In the tertiary sector; 1 was in the movement and storage of goods, 1 was a technical professional or scientist, 1 was in education.

In 2000, there were 6 workers who commuted into the municipality and 50 workers who commuted away. The municipality is a net exporter of workers, with about 8.3 workers leaving the municipality for every one entering. Of the working population, 7.8% used public transportation to get to work, and 58.4% used a private car.

== Religion ==
From the 2000 census, 29 or 17.8% were Roman Catholic, while 95 or 58.3% belonged to the Swiss Reformed Church. Of the rest of the population, there were 2 members of an Orthodox church (or about 1.23% of the population), and there were 5 individuals (or about 3.07% of the population) who belonged to another Christian church. 27 (or about 16.56% of the population) belonged to no church, are agnostic or atheist, and 5 individuals (or about 3.07% of the population) did not answer the question.

== Education ==
In Brenles about 48 or (29.4%) of the population have completed non-mandatory upper secondary education, and 30 or (18.4%) have completed additional higher education (either university or a Fachhochschule). Of the 30 who completed tertiary schooling, 53.3% were Swiss men, 43.3% were Swiss women.

In the 2009/2010 school year there were a total of 32 students in the Brenles school district. In the Vaud cantonal school system, two years of non-obligatory pre-school are provided by the political districts. During the school year, the political district provided pre-school care for a total of 155 children of which 83 children (53.5%) received subsidized pre-school care. The canton's primary school program requires students to attend for four years. There were 17 students in the municipal primary school program. The obligatory lower secondary school program lasts for six years and there were 14 students in those schools. There were also 1 students who were home schooled or attended another non-traditional school.

As of 2000, there were 9 students in Brenles who came from another municipality, while 28 residents attended schools outside the municipality.
