= Romont Glass Museum =

Museum of stained glass in Romont, Switzerland

Vitromusée Romont
- Location within Switzerland
- Former name: Musée suisse du vitrail
- Established: 1981
- Location: Romont, Switzerland
- Coordinates: 46°41′41″N 6°55′07″E
- Director: Francine Giese
- Website: www.vitromusee.ch

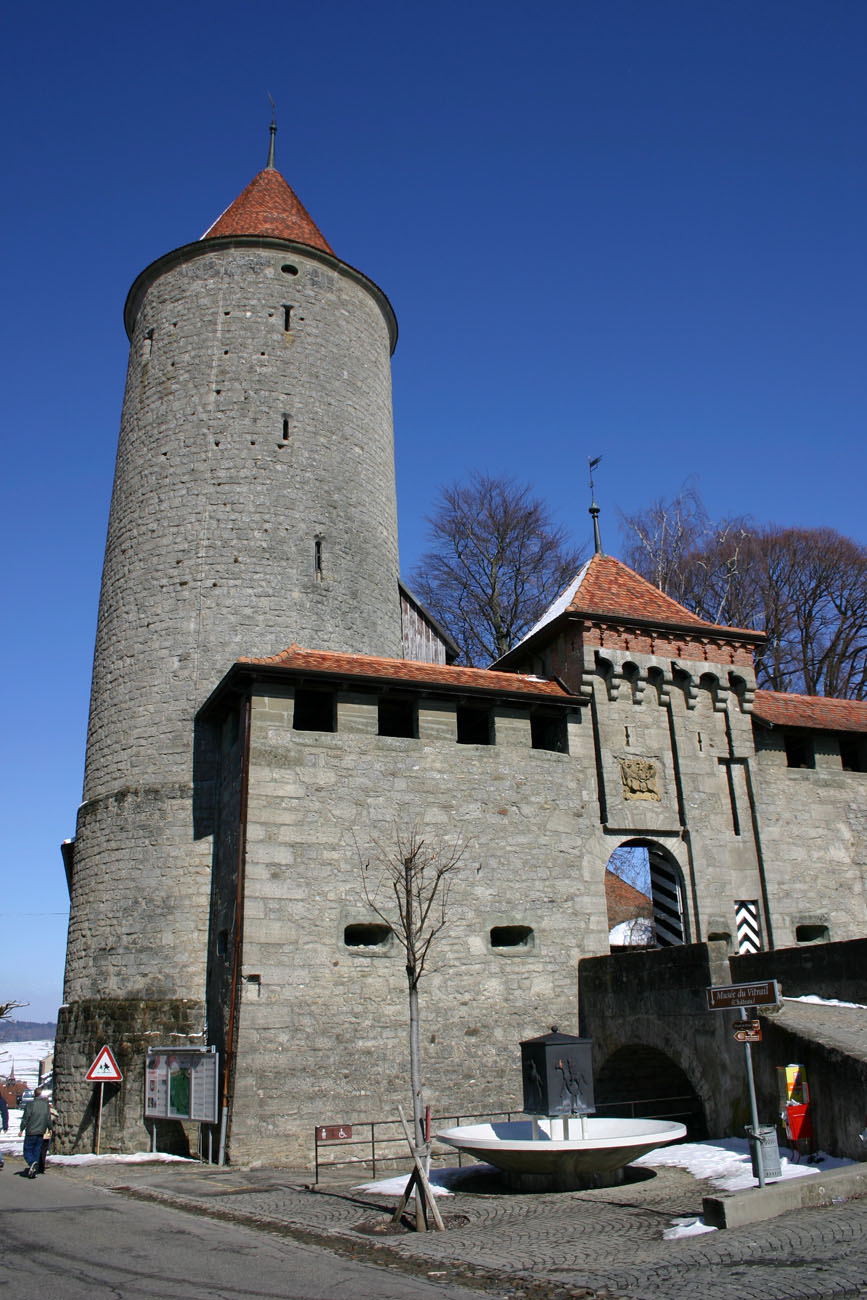
Romont Castle

The Romont Glass Museum (Vitromusée Romont), formerly the Swiss Museum of Stained Glass, was founded in 1981 and is located in the Château de Romont in the canton of Fribourg, Switzerland. The museum stands on a hilltop in the upper Glâne Valley, in the town of Romont, whose name derives from the French for “round hill”.

== History ==
Until 2006, annual attendance fluctuated between 15,000 and 18,000. In October 2006, the museum reopened following renovations and an extension at the Château de Romont. At that time, it adopted the name Vitromusée and was listed as a Swiss cultural asset of national importance, as was the castle housing it.

The museum is housed in the Château de Romont, a medieval fortress originally developed as a strategic military base by Peter II of Savoy. Large sections of the medieval fortifications, including the Tour à Boyer, remain intact. The Château stands at the highest point in the town and includes a courtyard and well-preserved defensive structures. The collection includes stained glass works dating from the medieval period to the present, as well as glass art objects such as paintings, furniture, and jewellery.

From July to November 2007, the museum welcomed 25,000 visitors during its exhibition “Chagall - Le vitrail. The Color of Love.” In 2014, it exhibited Marc Chagall's Bouquet de Chagall from June to November.

== Structure ==
=== Vitrofestival ===
Vitrofestival is a biennial glass art event organized at the Vitromusée since 2007. In 2015, it attracted almost 5,000 spectators.

=== Vitrocentre ===
Vitrocentre, formerly the "Centre suisse de recherche sur le vitrail" (Swiss Center for Stained Glass Research), was founded in 1988.

== See also ==
- List of museums in Switzerland
- Peter II of Savoy
