= Romont =

Romont FR
- Municipality
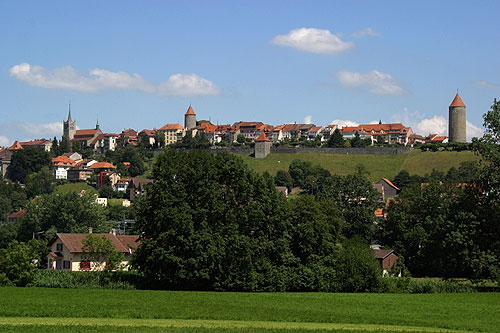

- Flag Coat of arms
- Location of Romont FR
- Location within Switzerland Location within Canton of Fribourg
- Coordinates: 46°42′N 6°55′E
- Country: Switzerland
- Canton: Fribourg
- District: Glâne

Government
  - Mayor: Syndic

Area
  - Total: 10.90 km^{2} (4.21 sq mi)
- Elevation: 780 m (2,560 ft)

Population (December 2020)
  - Total: 5,417
  - Density: 497.0/km^{2} (1,287/sq mi)
- Time zone: UTC+01:00 (CET)
  - Summer (DST): UTC+02:00 (CEST)
- Postal code: 1680
- SFOS number: 2096
- ISO 3166 code: CH-FR
- Surrounded by: Billens-Hennens, Dompierre (VD), La Folliaz, Mézières, Prévonloup (VD), Sédeilles (VD), Siviriez, Villars-Bramard (VD), Villaz-Saint-Pierre
- Website: www.romont.ch

Romont (/ˈroʊmɒnt/; French: [ʁɔmɔ̃]; Arpitan: Remont, locally Remon [ʀəˈmɔ̃]) is a municipality and capital of the district of Glâne in the canton of Fribourg in Switzerland.

== History ==
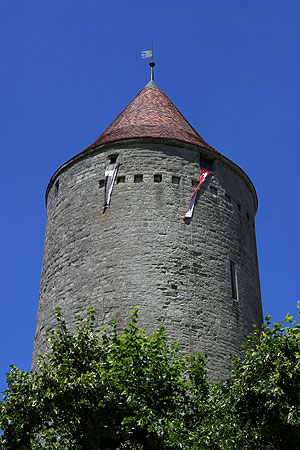
The Boyer tower or Petit Donjon was built around 1250-1260

Romont is first mentioned in 1177 as in Rotundo Monte. In 1244 it was mentioned as Romont. The municipality was formerly known by its German name Remund, however, that name is no longer used.

The oldest trace of human settlement in Romont is five Hallstatt era tumuli in the village of Bossens. The ruins of several other prehistoric settlements have been discovered including the foundation of a Roman era building at Bochanat.

The alleged founding of Romont in 921 by the Burgundian King Rudolph II is likely a legend. A document from 1177 from the Abbey of Hauterive mentions the Romont as a wooded hill. In 1239 Anselme (or Nantelme) sold the rights to Romont hill to Peter II of Savoy. At that time, Romont was part of the territory of the Bishop of Lausanne. In 1240 Peter II sent a castellan to Romont to build a castle and found a village. A few years later, the Peace of Evian in 1244, confirmed the Savoy rights to Romont. The main castle (Grand Donjon), with a typical Savoy square floor plan, was completed before 1260. The original castle partially collapsed in 1579 and was rebuilt by Fribourg in 1591. Another castle with a round tower, formerly known as the Petit Donjon, but now known as Boyer-tower was built around 1250–1260, most likely by Peter II. The town's ring wall had three gate towers which faced toward Billens, Mézières, and Fribourg. The walls were demolished in 1842–1854. Between 1843 and 1865, five fires destroyed the gothic center of town, which was replaced with more modern buildings.

Romont was one of the most important cities in the Vaud region. At the end of the 13th century, its population numbered more than 1,000 and before the Burgundian Wars (1474) it housed nearly 1,500 residents. It was the center of the bailiwick and an important link between Fribourg and the Savoy possessions in the Lake Geneva. Presumably around 1285–1293, but certainly no later than 1328, it was granted town rights modeled after the rights of Moudon.

During the Burgundian Wars, Bern and Fribourg looted and burned the city twice. Romont remained loyal to its Savoy rulers until the 1536 Bernese conquest of Vaud. During the conquest by the Protestant Bernese troops, Romont was able to ally with Catholic Fribourg and retain the traditional faith.

It was capital of the bailiwick of Romont until 1798, and until 1803 the capital of the same district. During the Stecklikrieg in 1802, Romont continued to support the Helvetic Republic. Between 1803 and 1848 it was the capital of the Romont prefecture, then it became the capital of the district of Glâne.

== Geography ==
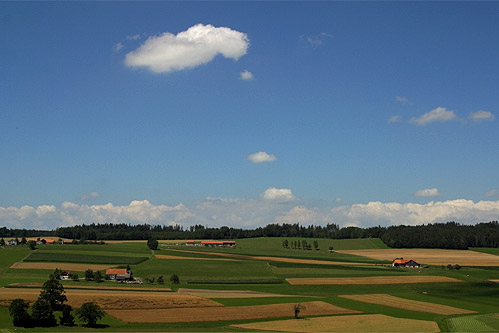
Farmland around Romont

Aerial view from 200 m by Walter Mittelholzer (1926)

Romont has an area, as of 2009, of 10.9 square kilometers (4.2 mi^{2}). Of this area, 7.32 km^{2} (2.83 mi^{2}) or 67.2% is used for agricultural purposes, while 1.48 km^{2} (0.57 mi^{2}) or 13.6% is forested. Of the rest of the land, 2.07 km^{2} (0.80 mi^{2}) or 19.0% is settled (buildings or roads), 0.03 km^{2} (7.4 acres) or 0.3% is either rivers or lakes.

Of the built up area, industrial buildings made up 4.4% of the total area while housing and buildings made up 6.0% and transportation infrastructure made up 6.1%. Power and water infrastructure, as well as other special developed areas, made up 1.6% of the area Out of the forested land, 12.2% of the total land area is heavily forested and 1.4% is covered with orchards or small clusters of trees. Of the agricultural land, 37.9% is used for growing crops and 28.2% is pastures, while 1.1% is used for orchards or vine crops. All the water in the municipality is flowing water.

The town is the capital of the Glâne district. It is located at the intersection of the roads to Fribourg, Lausanne and Bulle and is on the border with the Canton of Vaud.

== Coat of arms ==
The blazon of the municipal coat of arms is Gules, a Castle Argent masoned and with portcullis Sable embattled with a Tower dexter higher than sinister, and in chief an escutcheon Gules a Cross Argent.

== Demographics ==
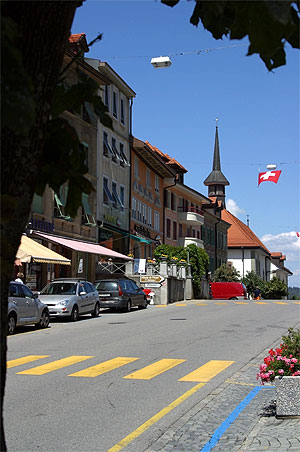
Main street through Romont

Romont has a population (as of December 2020) of 5,417. As of 2008, 33.5% of the population are resident foreign nationals. Over the last 10 years (2000–2010) the population has changed at a rate of 13.7%. Migration accounted for 8.2%, while births and deaths accounted for 3.4%.

Most of the population (as of 2000) speaks French (3,322 or 83.8%) as their first language, Portuguese is the second most common (245 or 6.2%) and German is the third (93 or 2.3%). There are 27 people who speak Italian.

As of 2008, the population was 49.7% male and 50.3% female. The population was made up of 1,342 Swiss men (30.0% of the population) and 879 (19.7%) non-Swiss men. There were 1,466 Swiss women (32.8%) and 780 (17.5%) non-Swiss women. Of the population in the municipality, 1,210 or about 30.5% were born in Romont and lived there in 2000. There were 1,112 or 28.1% who were born in the same canton, while 439 or 11.1% were born somewhere else in Switzerland, and 1,027 or 25.9% were born outside of Switzerland.

As of 2000, minors (0–19 years old) make up 25.2% of the population, while adults (20–64 years old) make up 61.3% and seniors (over 64 years old) make up 13.5%.

As of 2000, there were 1,697 people who were single and never married in the municipality. There were 1,842 married individuals, 249 widows or widowers and 176 individuals who are divorced.

As of 2000, there were 1,667 private households in the municipality, and an average of 2.3 persons per household. There were 609 households that consist of only one person and 140 households with five or more people. In 2000, a total of 1,627 apartments (83.5% of the total) were permanently occupied, while 120 apartments (6.2%) were seasonally occupied and 202 apartments (10.4%) were empty. As of 2009, the construction rate of new housing units was 4.6 new units per 1000 residents. The vacancy rate for the municipality, in 2010, was 0.66%.

Historical population

Year	Pop.	±% p.a.
1278 (Note: 230 Hearths)	920	—
1364 (Note: 330 Hearths)	1,320	+0.42%
1417 (Note: 400 Hearths)	1,600	+0.36%
1850	1,527	−0.01%
1860	1,718	+1.19%
1870	2,005	+1.56%
1880	1,958	−0.24%

Year	Pop.	±% p.a.
1888	1,972	+0.09%
1900	2,210	+0.95%
1910	2,418	+0.90%
1920	2,437	+0.08%
1930	2,379	−0.24%
1941	2,590	+0.78%
1950	2,931	+1.38%

Year	Pop.	±% p.a.
1960	3,007	+0.26%
1970	3,371	+1.15%
1980	3,576	+0.59%
1990	4,098	+1.37%
2000	3,964	−0.33%
2010	4,588	+1.47%

== Heritage sites of national significance ==
The Trappist Abbaye de la Fille-Dieu, Romont Castle, the Vitromusée/Musée suisse du vitrail et des arts du verre, the collegiate church of Notre-Dame de l’Assomption, and the town's fortifications are listed as Swiss heritage sites of national significance. The entire village of Romont is part of the Inventory of Swiss Heritage Sites.

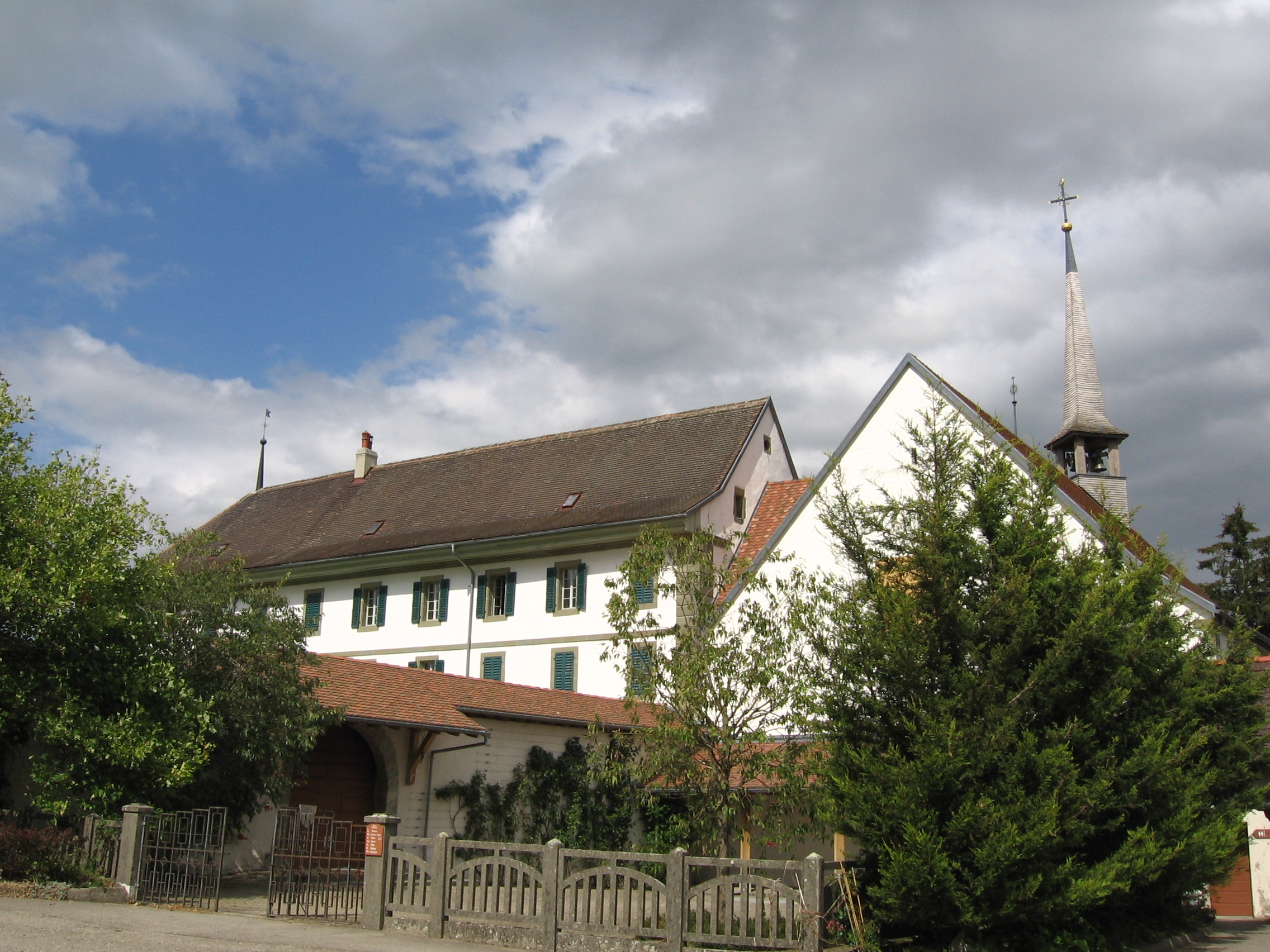
Cistercian Abbey Church of Notre-Dame de la Fille-Dieu

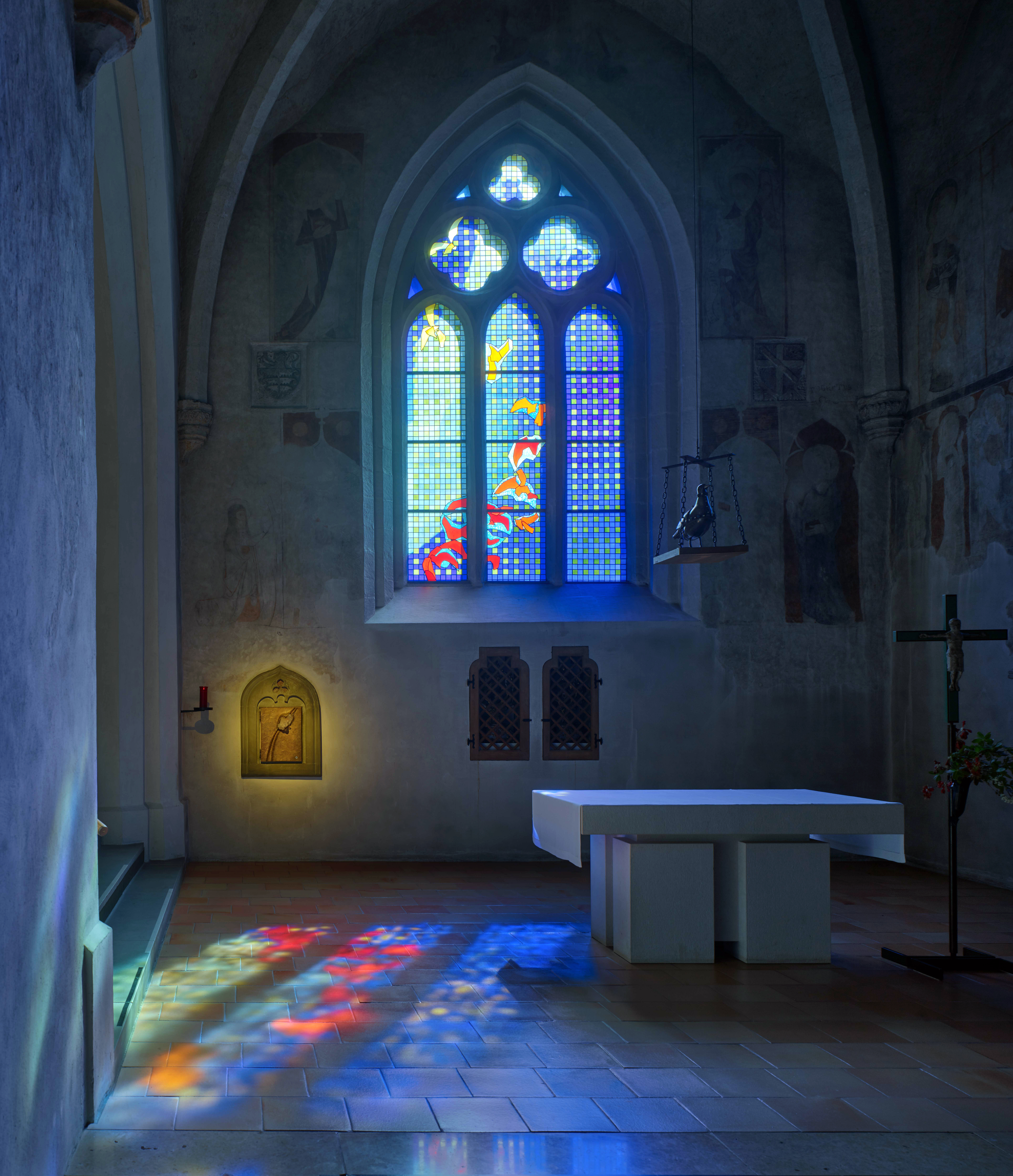
Interior of the restored abbey church of Notre Dame de la Fille-Dieu

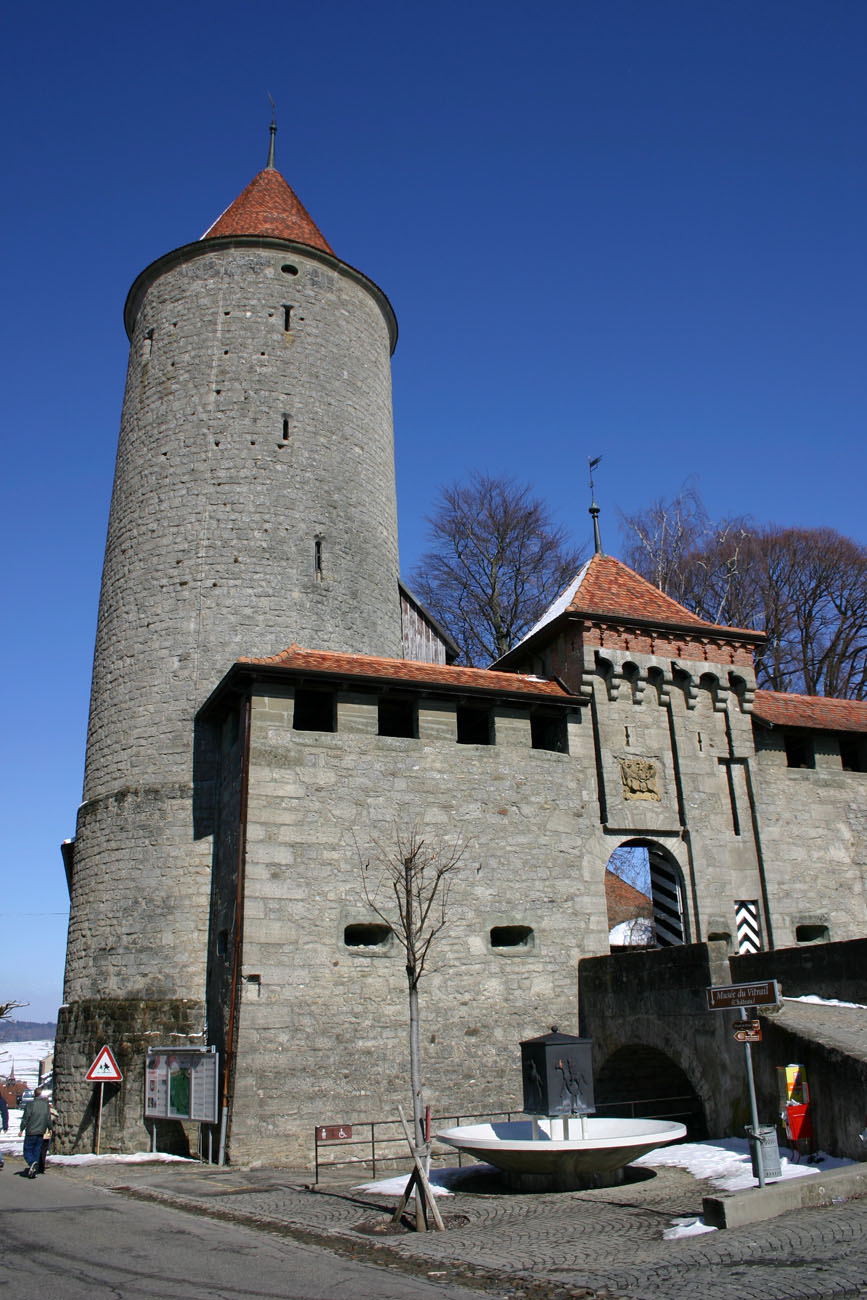
The castle

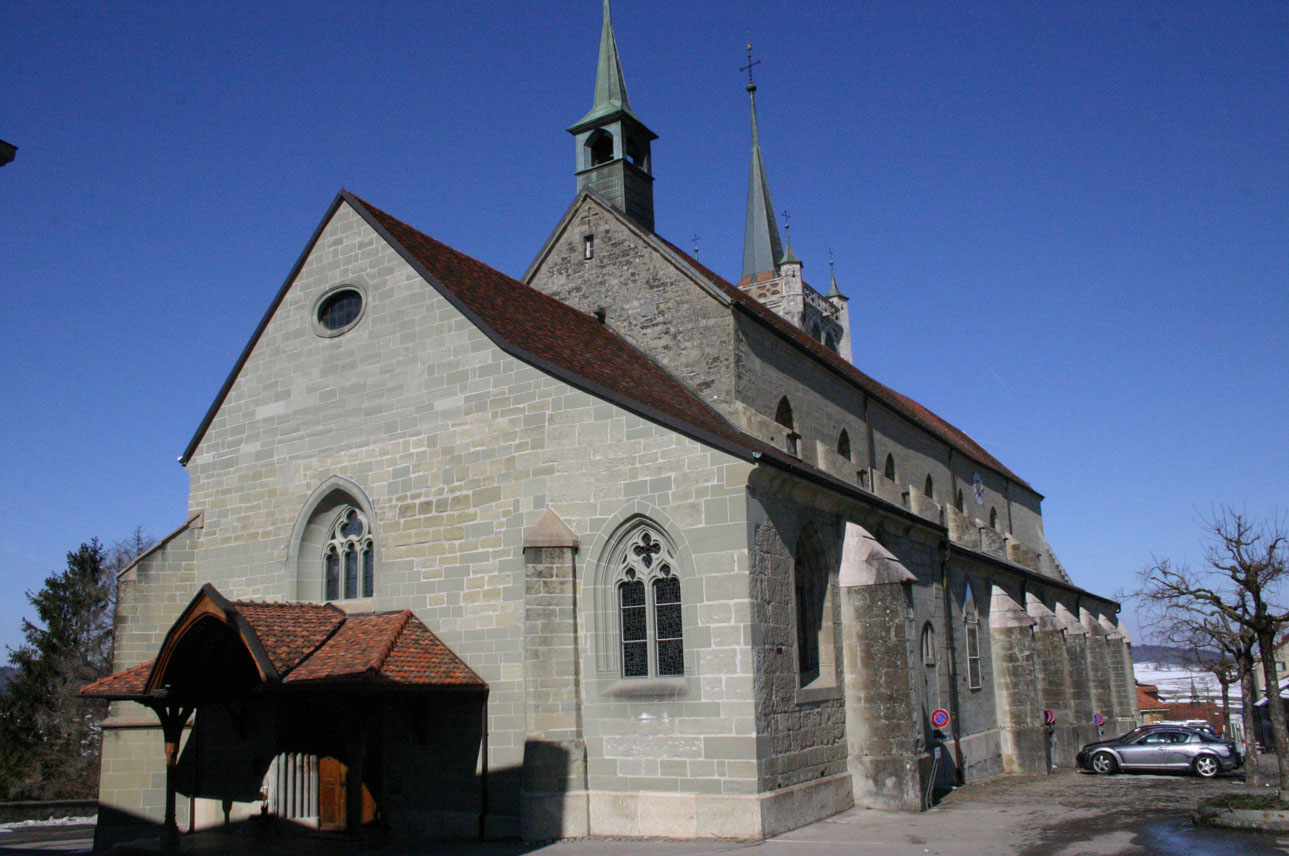
Collegiate church of Notre-Dame de l’Assomption

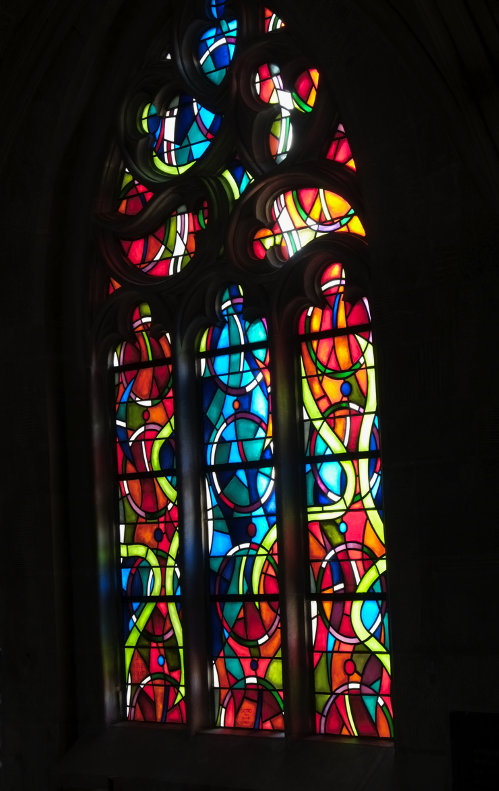
Stained-glass window in the Collegiate church by Sergio de Castro, 1980

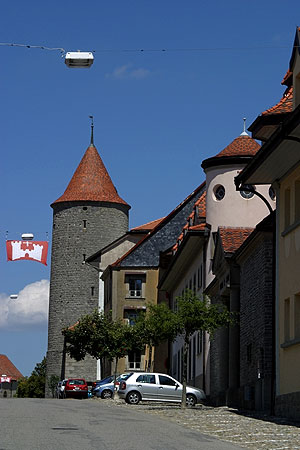
Town fortifications

== Twin town ==
Romont is twinned with the town of

- Mondolfo, Italy.

== Politics ==
In the 2011 federal election the most popular party was the CVP which received 27.4% of the vote. The next three most popular parties were the SP (26.5%), the SVP (20.4%) and the FDP (9.7%).

The CVP received about the same percentage of the vote as they did in the 2007 Federal election (25.7% in 2007 vs 27.4% in 2011). The SPS retained about the same popularity (22.9% in 2007), the SVP retained about the same popularity (21.6% in 2007) and the FDP lost popularity (20.7% in 2007). A total of 1,118 votes were cast in this election, of which 24 or 2.1% were invalid.

== Economy ==
As of 2010, Romont had an unemployment rate of 5.7%. As of 2008, there were 100 people employed in the primary economic sector and about 34 businesses involved in this sector. 1,109 people were employed in the secondary sector and there were 60 businesses in this sector. 1,714 people were employed in the tertiary sector, with 230 businesses in this sector.

There were 1,983 residents of the municipality who were employed in some capacity, of which females made up 43.0% of the workforce. In 2008 the total number of full-time equivalent jobs was 2,460. The number of jobs in the primary sector was 76, of which 68 were in agriculture and 8 were in forestry or lumber production. The number of jobs in the secondary sector was 1,059 of which 666 or (62.9%) were in manufacturing and 360 (34.0%) were in construction. The number of jobs in the tertiary sector was 1,325. In the tertiary sector; 526 or 39.7% were in wholesale or retail sales or the repair of motor vehicles, 72 or 5.4% were in the movement and storage of goods, 97 or 7.3% were in a hotel or restaurant, 3 or 0.2% were in the information industry, 56 or 4.2% were the insurance or financial industry, 81 or 6.1% were technical professionals or scientists, 162 or 12.2% were in education and 120 or 9.1% were in health care.

In 2000, there were 1,686 workers who commuted into the municipality and 924 workers who commuted away. The municipality is a net importer of workers, with about 1.8 workers entering the municipality for every one leaving. Of the working population, 13.1% used public transportation to get to work, and 60.6% used a private car.

== Religion ==
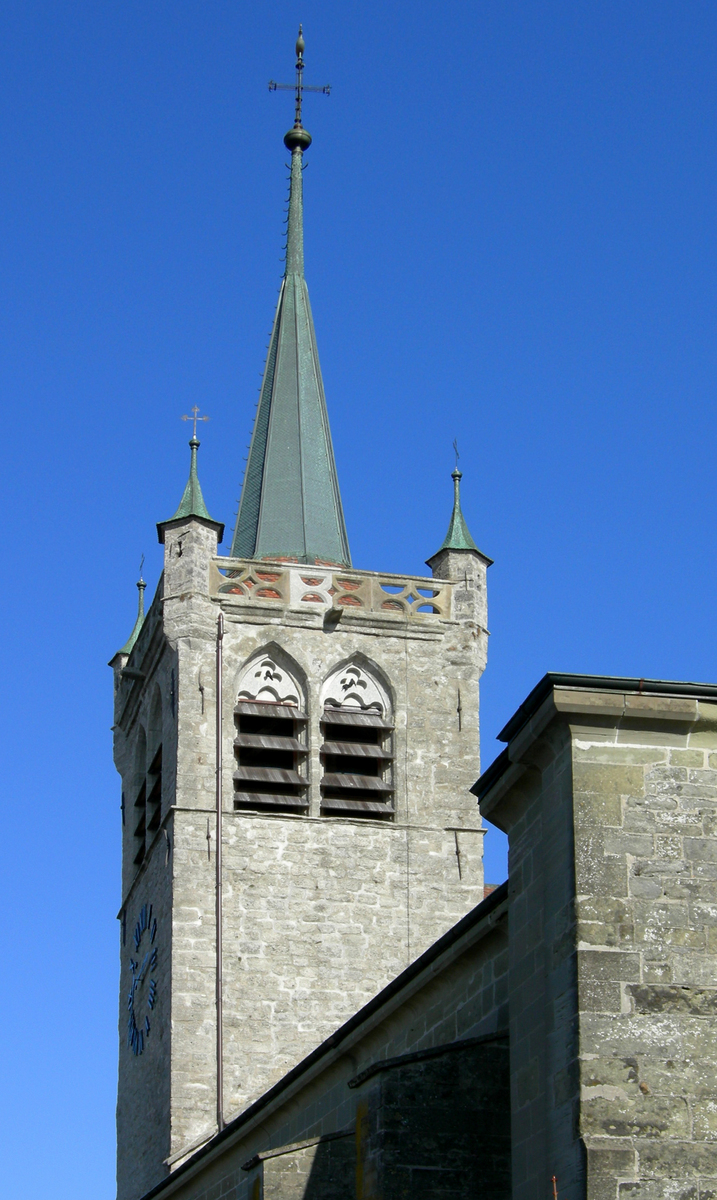
Church tower in Romont

From the 2000 census, 2,843 or 71.7% were Roman Catholic, while 254 or 6.4% belonged to the Swiss Reformed Church. Of the rest of the population, there were 120 members of an Orthodox church (or about 3.03% of the population), there were 5 individuals (or about 0.13% of the population) who belonged to the Christian Catholic Church, and there were 77 individuals (or about 1.94% of the population) who belonged to another Christian church. There were 253 (or about 6.38% of the population) who were Islamic. 175 (or about 4.41% of the population) belonged to no church, are agnostic or atheist, and 273 individuals (or about 6.89% of the population) did not answer the question.

== Weather ==
Romont has an average of 131.5 days of rain or snow per year and on average receives 1,256 mm (49.4 in) of precipitation. The wettest month is June during which time Romont receives an average of 129 mm (5.1 in) of rain or snow. During this month there is precipitation for an average of 11.7 days. The month with the most days of precipitation is May, with an average of 14.2, but with only 123 mm (4.8 in) of rain or snow. The driest month of the year is February with an average of 81 mm (3.2 in) of precipitation over 10.6 days.

== Education ==
In Romont about 1,081 or (27.3%) of the population have completed non-mandatory upper secondary education, and 356 or (9.0%) have completed additional higher education (either university or a Fachhochschule). Of the 356 who completed tertiary schooling, 60.4% were Swiss men, 24.4% were Swiss women, 7.3% were non-Swiss men and 7.9% were non-Swiss women.

The Canton of Fribourg school system provides one year of non-obligatory Kindergarten, followed by six years of Primary school. This is followed by three years of obligatory lower Secondary school where the students are separated according to ability and aptitude. Following the lower Secondary students may attend a three or four year optional upper Secondary school. The upper Secondary school is divided into gymnasium (university preparatory) and vocational programs. After they finish the upper Secondary program, students may choose to attend a Tertiary school or continue their apprenticeship.

During the 2010–11 school year, there were a total of 1,569 students attending 86 classes in Romont. A total of 895 students from the municipality attended any school, either in the municipality or outside of it. There were 8 kindergarten classes with a total of 153 students in the municipality. The municipality had 15 primary classes and 316 students. During the same year, there were 42 lower secondary classes with a total of 917 students. There were 3 upper Secondary classes, with 66 upper Secondary students. The municipality had 18 special Tertiary classes, with 117 specialized Tertiary students.

As of 2000, there were 759 students in Romont who came from another municipality, while 149 residents attended schools outside the municipality.

== Transportation ==
The municipality has a railway station, Romont FR, on the Lausanne–Bern and Bulle–Romont lines. It has regular service to Geneva Airport, Lucerne, Bern, Bulle, Allaman, and Fribourg/Freiburg.

== Notable people ==
- A. F. P. Hulsewé (1910 – 1993 in Romont) a Dutch Sinologist, scholar, educator, and author; lived in Romont from 1975
- Pierrette Micheloud (1915 in Romont – 2007) a Swiss writer and painter
- Pierre Hemmer (1950–2013) an internet pioneer, his father was citizen of Romont in 1923
- Michel Peiry (1959 in Romont) known as the Sadist of Romont, a Swiss serial killer of 11 hitchhikers between 1981 and 1987
