= Chesalles-sur-Moudon =

- Former municipality
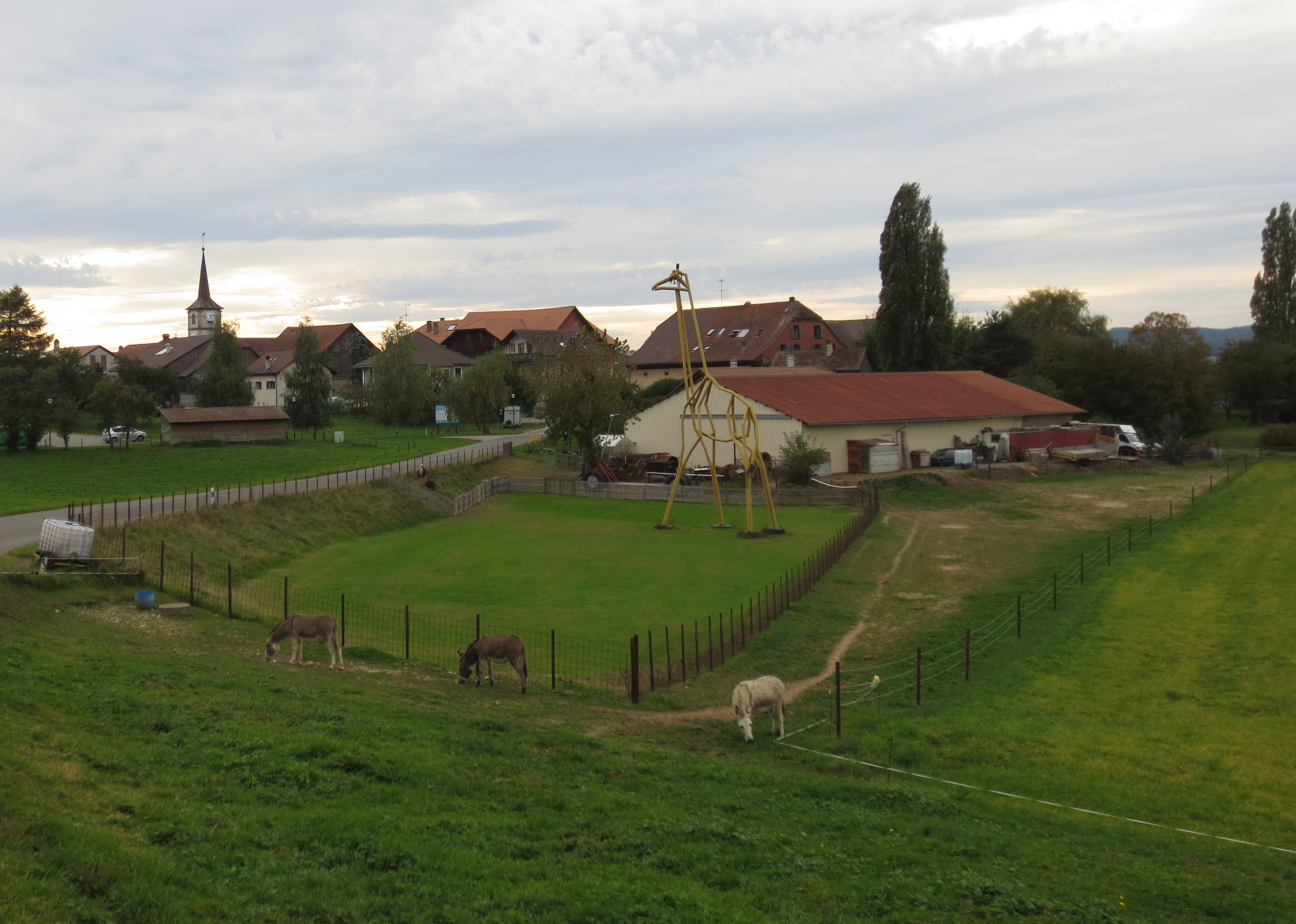

- Flag Coat of arms
- Location of Chesalles-sur-Moudon
- Location within Switzerland Location within Canton of Vaud
- Coordinates: 46°41′N 6°50′E
- Country: Switzerland
- Canton: Vaud
- District: Broye-Vully

Government
  - Mayor: Syndic

Area
  - Total: 1.67 km^{2} (0.64 sq mi)
- Elevation: 702 m (2,303 ft)

Population (2003)
  - Total: 161
  - Density: 96.4/km^{2} (250/sq mi)
- Time zone: UTC+01:00 (CET)
  - Summer (DST): UTC+02:00 (CEST)
- Postal code: 1683
- SFOS number: 5666
- ISO 3166 code: CH-VD
- Surrounded by: Brenles, Chavannes-sur-Moudon, Curtilles, Moudon, Sarzens
- Website: Profile (in French), SFSO statistics

Chesalles-sur-Moudon is a former municipality in the district Broye-Vully in the canton of Vaud in Switzerland. In 2017 the former municipalities of Chesalles-sur-Moudon, Brenles, Cremin, Forel-sur-Lucens and Sarzens merged into the municipality of Lucens.

== History ==
Chesalles-sur-Moudon is first mentioned in 1273 as Chesales.

== Geography ==
Aerial view (1964)

Chesalles-sur-Moudon had an area, as of 2009, of 1.67 square kilometers (0.64 sq mi). Of this area, 1.3 km^{2} (0.50 sq mi) or 77.8% is used for agricultural purposes, while 0.19 km^{2} (0.073 sq mi) or 11.4% is forested. Of the rest of the land, 0.17 km^{2} (0.066 sq mi) or 10.2% is settled (buildings or roads).

Of the built up area, housing and buildings made up 6.0% and transportation infrastructure made up 3.6%. Out of the forested land, all of the forested land area is covered with heavy forests. Of the agricultural land, 58.1% is used for growing crops and 17.4% is pastures, while 2.4% is used for orchards or vine crops.

The former municipality was part of the Moudon District until it was dissolved on 31 August 2006, and Chesalles-sur-Moudon became part of the new district of Broye-Vully.

== Coat of arms ==
The blazon of the municipal coat of arms is Per bend Gules and Argent, overall behind a Lion passant guardant holding a Scimitar a rising Sun all of Or which is also seen in the Lion and Sun

== Demographics ==
Corcelles-sur-Chavornay had a population (as of 2015) of 353. As of 2008, 4.5% of the population are resident foreign nationals. Over the last 10 years (1999–2009 ) the population has changed at a rate of -7.2%. It has changed at a rate of -9% due to migration and at a rate of 1.2% due to births and deaths.

Most of the population (as of 2000) speaks French (149 or 93.7%), with German being second most common (3 or 1.9%) and Dutch being third (2 or 1.3%). There is 1 person who speaks Romansh.

Of the population in the municipality 58 or about 36.5% were born in Chesalles-sur-Moudon and lived there in 2000. There were 61 or 38.4% who were born in the same canton, while 17 or 10.7% were born somewhere else in Switzerland, and 18 or 11.3% were born outside of Switzerland.

In 2008 there were 2 live births to Swiss citizens and . Ignoring immigration and emigration, the population of Swiss citizens increased by 2 while the foreign population remained the same. There was 1 Swiss man who emigrated from Switzerland and 1 Swiss woman who immigrated back to Switzerland. The total Swiss population change in 2008 (from all sources, including moves across municipal borders) was an increase of 4 and the non-Swiss population decreased by 2 people. This represents a population growth rate of 1.3%.

The age distribution, as of 2009, in Chesalles-sur-Moudon is; 8 children or 5.2% of the population are between 0 and 9 years old and 26 teenagers or 16.8% are between 10 and 19. Of the adult population, 22 people or 14.2% of the population are between 20 and 29 years old. 16 people or 10.3% are between 30 and 39, 28 people or 18.1% are between 40 and 49, and 22 people or 14.2% are between 50 and 59. The senior population distribution is 14 people or 9.0% of the population are between 60 and 69 years old, 10 people or 6.5% are between 70 and 79, there are 8 people or 5.2% who are between 80 and 89, and there is 1 person who is 90 and older.

As of 2000, there were 75 people who were single and never married in the municipality. There were 80 married individuals, 1 widows or widowers and 3 individuals who are divorced.

As of 2000, there were 54 private households in the municipality, and an average of 2.9 persons per household. There were 12 households that consist of only one person and 10 households with five or more people. Out of a total of 55 households that answered this question, 21.8% were households made up of just one person. Of the rest of the households, there are 14 married couples without children, 26 married couples with children There were 2 single parents with a child or children.

In 2000 there were 19 single-family homes (or 48.7% of the total) out of a total of 39 inhabited buildings. There were 8 multi-family buildings (20.5%), along with 10 multi-purpose buildings that were mostly used for housing (25.6%) and 2 other use buildings (commercial or industrial) that also had some housing (5.1%). Of the single-family homes 3 were built before 1919, while 8 were built between 1990 and 2000. The greatest number of single-family homes (8) were built between 1991 and 1995. The most multi-family homes (3) were built before 1919 and the next most (2) were built between 1961 and 1970.

In 2000 there were 60 apartments in the municipality. The most common apartment size was 4 rooms of which there were 18. There were 1 single-room apartment and 26 apartments with five or more rooms. Of these apartments, a total of 53 apartments (88.3% of the total) were permanently occupied, while 5 apartments (8.3%) were seasonally occupied and 2 apartments (3.3%) were empty. As of 2009, the construction rate of new housing units was 6.5 new units per 1000 residents. The vacancy rate for the municipality, in 2010, was 0%.

The historical population is given in the following chart:

== Politics ==
In the 2007 federal election the most popular party was the SVP which received 39.45% of the vote. The next three most popular parties were the SP (19.2%), the Green Party (12.24%) and the Other (9.7%). In the federal election, a total of 53 votes were cast, and the voter turnout was 47.3%.

== Economy ==
As of 2010, Chesalles-sur-Moudon had an unemployment rate of 2.4%. As of 2008, there were 23 people employed in the primary economic sector and about 8 businesses involved in this sector. 1 person was employed in the secondary sector and there was 1 business in this sector. 2 people were employed in the tertiary sector, with 1 business in this sector. There were 71 residents of the municipality who were employed in some capacity, of which females made up 39.4% of the workforce.

In 2008 the total number of full-time equivalent jobs was 16. The number of jobs in the primary sector was 14, all of which were in agriculture. The number of jobs in the secondary sector was 1, in construction. The number of jobs in the tertiary sector was 1, in education.

In 2000, there were 3 workers who commuted into the municipality and 49 workers who commuted away. The municipality is a net exporter of workers, with about 16.3 workers leaving the municipality for every one entering. Of the working population, 8.5% used public transportation to get to work, and 63.4% used a private car.

== Religion ==
From the 2000 census, 17 or 10.7% were Roman Catholic, while 116 or 73.0% belonged to the Swiss Reformed Church. Of the rest of the population, there was 1 member of an Orthodox church who belonged. 18 (or about 11.32% of the population) belonged to no church, are agnostic or atheist, and 7 individuals (or about 4.40% of the population) did not answer the question.

== Education ==
In Chesalles-sur-Moudon about 49 or (30.8%) of the population have completed non-mandatory upper secondary education, and 22 or (13.8%) have completed additional higher education (either university or a Fachhochschule). Of the 22 who completed tertiary schooling, 54.5% were Swiss men, 27.3% were Swiss women.

In the 2009/2010 school year there were a total of 23 students in the Chesalles-sur-Moudon school district. In the Vaud cantonal school system, two years of non-obligatory pre-school are provided by the political districts. During the school year, the political district provided pre-school care for a total of 155 children of which 83 children (53.5%) received subsidized pre-school care. The canton's primary school program requires students to attend for four years. There were 8 students in the municipal primary school program. The obligatory lower secondary school program lasts for six years and there were 15 students in those schools.

As of 2000, there were 8 students in Chesalles-sur-Moudon who came from another municipality, while 35 residents attended schools outside the municipality.
