= Michel Peiry =

Swiss serial killer

- Born: 28 February 1959 (age 67); Romont, Switzerland
- Other name: "The Sadist of Romont"
- Conviction: Murder
- Penalty: Life imprisonment

Details
- Victims: 5–11
- Span of crimes: 1981–1987
- Country: Switzerland, France, United States, Yugoslavia, Italy
- States: Annecy, Camargue, Valais, Rijeka, Ticino, Neuchâtel, Como, Florida
- Date apprehended: 1 May 1987

Michel Peiry (born 28 February 1959), known as The Sadist of Romont, is a Swiss serial killer who killed at least 5 people between 1981 and 1987.

Described as the worst serial killer known in Switzerland since the Second World War, 11 murders were attributed to him, all of them carried out in the same way: he would take young teenage hitchhikers, tie them up, violate or sexually abuse them, then finally kill them and burn the corpses afterwards. These crimes upset all of Switzerland for many months and even after that, in 2004, more than 15 years after the events, Peiry returned to the debate when the people had to decide on a popular initiative concerning the treatment of violent offenders in the country.

== Murders ==
The first crime attributed to Michel Peiry dates back to 1 September 1981, when the then 22-year-old travelled to the United States. There he met a young Canadian named Sylvestre, who soon disappeared without a trace. Peiry initially confessed to the murder, then retracted his claim, and finally reacknowledged it. Subsequently, he would go back and forth between confessions and retractions for all his other crimes.

On 4 February 1984, Peiry murdered a young man named Frédéric in the Annecy region of France. In June 1985, he murdered his only female victim, a woman named Anne-Laure (or possibly Anne-Fleur, as Peiry could not exactly remember her name) in Saintes-Maries-de-la-Mer, Camargue. On 7 May 1986, Peiry killed his first Swiss victim, a young man named Cédric, whose decomposing corpse was found in Albinen, an isolated region of Valais.

In July 1986, Michel Peiry made trips to several European countries, including Yugoslavia. He admitted to the murder of a man named Silvio in the region in Rijeka (present-day Croatia), before retracting his confession. In the night between 14 and 15 August 1986, in the canton of Ticino, he came across the young hitchhiker Fabio V., killing him in his usual method. In November of the same year, Peiry attacked a man named Yves Ath in Neuchâtel, who miraculously survived, despite suffering sexual abuse and almost dying.

Another victim, the young Vincent, was found burned in March 1987. There were apparent similarities with the Pierre Chanal modus operandi, but this was never proven conclusively. Peiry was suspected in the so-called Mourmelon disappearance case, especially since between 1980 and 1987, Peiry frequented the military zones of northern France and the Valdahon camp in Doubs near the Swiss border. Due to a lack of evidence, this lead was abandoned in 1990.

A month later, on 16 April 1987, a young Frenchman became his ninth victim, in the Como region of Italy. Peiry confessed to his murder but then retracted the confession. Finally, on 24 April 1987, he attacked his last victim, a young man named Thomas, who survived.

Michel Peiry was arrested on 1 May 1987 while doing his military service in the canton of Bern, and was subsequently sentenced to life imprisonment by the court.

Peiry was arrested a few days after the disappearance of 19-year-old Patrick Gache, a conscript of the 4th Regiment of Dragoons Mourmelon. No investigation or evidence could be established. In July 1988, Pierre Chanal was arrested in Dijon during the flagrant rape of a Hungarian tourist. He worked as a sergeant at the Valdahon military camp in Franche-Comté between 1965 and 1977 for the 30th Regiment of Dragoons, regularly taking part in tank manoeuvres around the camp. Between 1999 and 2000, a survey of the gendarmes in Besançon established that two soldiers had disappeared between 1975 and 1977 in Valdahon. However, no connection could be made to either Peiry or Chanal.

In 2002 and again in 2009, Peiry made several parole requests, without any success.

== Modus operandi ==
Peiry corresponds perfectly to the typical portrait of an organized psychopath. Despite having an unhappy childhood and a violent father, he managed to lead a normal life, and was appreciated by everybody in his social life and work. However, behind the "mask of normality", he was tortured, first by his repressed homosexuality, then by violent fantasies, which he acquired early. By his own admission, he discovered his sexuality through a review of bondage: in his mind, sexuality and violence became inseparable. In France, he is often compared with Pierre Chanal, as there were similarities.

== See also ==
- List of serial killers by number of victims

== Bibliography ==
- Janick Pont: Michel Peiry: Sexual impulses obscure to crime, Montreux, S. Udrisard Publisher, ISBN 2-88384-001-6

== Radio broadcast ==
- "The case of the Sadist of Romont", 23 February 2016 in L'Heure du crime, hosted by Jacques Pradel on RTL
