= Municipalities of the canton of Fribourg =

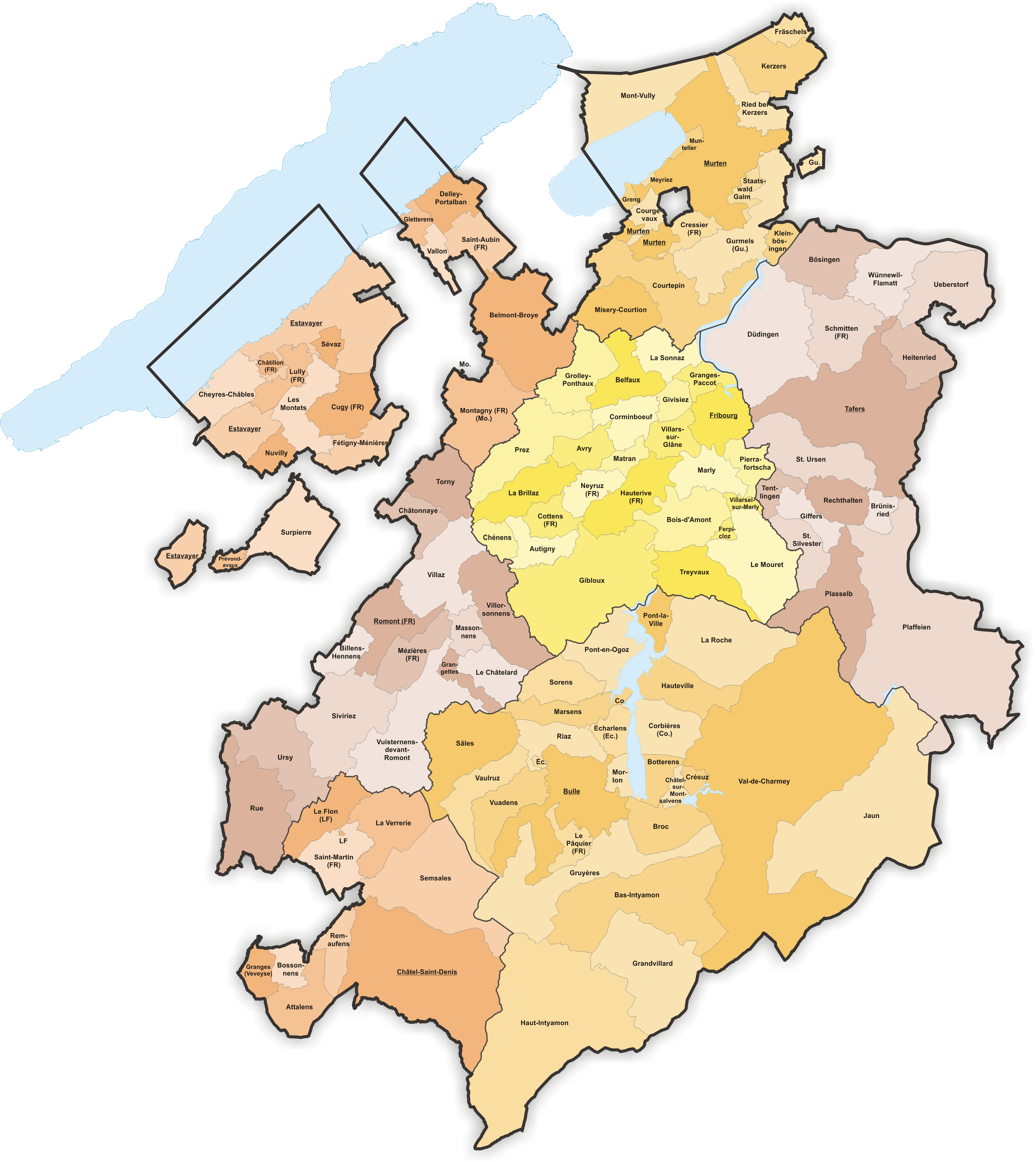
Municipalities in the canton of Fribourg

There are 119 municipalities in the canton of Fribourg, Switzerland (as of January 2026).

== List ==
- Attalens
- Autigny
- Avry
- Bas-Intyamon
- Belfaux
- Belmont-Broye
- Billens-Hennens
- Bois-d'Amont
- Bösingen
- Bossonnens
- Botterens
- Broc
- Brünisried
- Bulle
- Châtel-Saint-Denis
- Châtel-sur-Montsalvens
- Châtillon (FR)
- Châtonnaye
- Chénens
- Cheyres-Châbles
- Corbières
- Corminboeuf
- Cottens (FR)
- Courgevaux
- Courlevon
- Courtepin
- Cressier (FR)
- Crésuz
- Cugy (FR)
- Delley-Portalban
- Düdingen
- Echarlens
- Estavayer
- Ferpicloz
- Fétigny-Ménières
- Fräschels
- Fribourg
- Gibloux (FR)
- Giffers
- Givisiez
- Gletterens
- Grandvillard
- Granges (Veveyse)
- Granges-Paccot
- Grangettes
- Greng
- Grolley-Ponthaux
- Gruyères
- Gurmels
- Haut-Intyamon
- Hauterive (FR)
- Hauteville
- Heitenried
- Jaun
- Kerzers
- Kleinbösingen
- La Brillaz
- La Roche
- La Sonnaz
- La Verrerie
- Le Châtelard
- Le Flon
- Le Mouret
- Le Pâquier (FR)
- Les Montets
- Lully (FR)
- Marly
- Marsens
- Massonnens
- Matran
- Meyriez
- Mézières (FR)
- Misery-Courtion
- Mont-Vully
- Montagny (FR)
- Morlon
- Muntelier
- Murten
- Neyruz (FR)
- Nuvilly
- Pierrafortscha
- Plaffeien
- Plasselb
- Pont-en-Ogoz
- Pont-la-Ville
- Prévondavaux
- Prez
- Rechthalten
- Remaufens
- Riaz
- Ried bei Kerzers
- Romont (FR)
- Rue
- Saint-Aubin (FR)
- Saint-Martin (FR)
- Sâles
- Schmitten (FR)
- Semsales
- Sévaz
- Siviriez
- Sorens
- St. Silvester
- St. Ursen
- Surpierre
- Tafers
- Tentlingen
- Torny
- Treyvaux
- Ueberstorf
- Ursy
- Val-de-Charmey
- Vallon
- Vaulruz
- Villars-sur-Glâne
- Villarsel-sur-Marly
- Villaz
- Villorsonnens
- Vuadens
- Vuisternens-devant-Romont
- Wünnewil-Flamatt

== Mergers ==
As of 1 January 1994
the municipalities Léchelles and Chandon merged under the name of Léchelles.

As of 1 January 2000
the municipalities Grolley and Corsalettes merged under the name of Grolley.
the municipalities Gurmels and Kleingurmels merged under the name of Gurmels.
the municipalities Montagny-la-Ville and Montagny-les-Monts merged under the name of Montagny (FR).

As of 1 January 2001
the municipalities Maules, Romanens, Rueyres-Treyfayes and Sâles merged under the name of Sâles.
the municipalities Bionnens, Mossel, Ursy and Vauderens merged under the name of Ursy.
the municipalities Gillarens, Promasens and Rue merged under the name of Rue.
the municipalities Lentigny FR, Lovens and Onnens FR merged under the name of La Brillaz.
the municipalities Chavannes-sous-Orsonnens, Orsonnens, Villargiroud and Villarsiviriaux merged under the name of Villorsonnens.
the municipalities Marsens and Vuippens merged under the name of Marsens.
the municipalities Ecuvillens and Posieux merged under the name of Hauterive (FR).

As of 1 January 2002
the municipalities Albeuve, Lessoc, Montbovon and Neirivue merged under the name of Haut-Intyamon.

As of 1 January 2003
the municipalities Avry-devant-Pont, Le Bry and Gumefens merged under the name of Pont-en-Ogoz.
the municipalities Gurmels, Guschelmuth, Liebistorf and Wallenbuch merged under the name of Gurmels.
the municipalities Les Ecasseys, Estévenens, La Joux (FR), Lieffrens, La Magne, Sommentier, Villariaz and Vuisternens-devant-Romont merged under the name of Vuisternens-devant-Romont.
the municipalities Courtaman and Courtepin merged under the name of Courtepin.
the municipalities Estavayer-le-Gibloux, Rueyres-Saint-Laurent, Villarlod and Villarsel-le-Gibloux merged under the name of Le Glèbe.
the municipalities Bonnefontaine, Essert, Montévraz, Oberried FR, Praroman and Zénauva merged under the name of Le Mouret.

As of 1 January 2004
the municipalities Bouloz, Pont (Veveyse) and Porsel merged under the name of Le Flon.
the municipalities Mannens-Grandsivaz and Montagny (FR) merged under the name of Montagny (FR).
the municipalities Besencens, Fiaugères and Saint-Martin (FR) merged under the name of Saint-Martin (FR).
the municipalities La Corbaz, Cormagens and Lossy-Formangueires merged under the name of La Sonnaz.
the municipalities Berlens and Mézières (FR) merged under the name of Mézières (FR).
the municipalities Middes and Torny-le-Grand merged under the name of Torny.
the municipalities Aumont, Frasses, Granges-de-Vesin and Montet (Broye) merged under the name of Les Montets.
the municipalities Enney, Estavannens and Villars-sous-Mont merged under the name of Bas-Intyamon.
the municipalities Chavannes-les-Forts, Prez-vers-Siviriez, Siviriez and Villaraboud merged under the name of Siviriez.
the municipalities La Neirigue and Vuisternens-devant-Romont merged under the name of Vuisternens-devant-Romont.
the municipalities Le Crêt, Grattavache and Progens merged under the name of La Verrerie.

As of 1 January 2005
the municipalities Delley and Portalban merged under the name of Delley-Portalban.
the municipalities Chapelle (Broye) and Cheiry merged under the name of Cheiry.
the municipalities Cordast and Gurmels merged under the name of Gurmels.
the municipalities Cugy FR and Vesin merged under the name of Cugy FR.
the municipalities Praratoud and Surpierre merged under the name of Surpierre.
the municipalities Lussy FR and Villarimboud merged under the name of La Folliaz.

As of 1 January 2006
the municipalities Botterens and Villarbeney merged under the name of Botterens.
the municipalities Bulle and La Tour-de-Trême merged under the name of Bulle.
the municipalities Autavaux, Forel (FR) and Montbrelloz merged under the name of Vernay.
the municipalities Esmonts and Vuarmarens merged under the name of Vuarmarens.
the municipalities Bollion, Lully (FR) and Seiry merged under the name of Lully (FR).
the municipalities Agriswil and Ried bei Kerzers merged under the name of Ried bei Kerzers.

As of 1 January 2011
the municipalities Corbières and Villarvolard merged under the name of Corbières.

As of 1 January 2012
the municipalities Estavayer-le-Lac and Font merged under the name of Estavayer-le-Lac.
the municipalities Ursy and Vuarmarens merged under the name of Ursy.

As of 1 January 2013
the municipalities Büchslen and Murten merged under the name of Murten.

As of 1 January 2014
the municipalities Cerniat and Charmey merged under the name of Val-de-Charmey.

As of 1 January 2016
the municipalities Domdidier, Dompierre, Léchelles and Russy merged under the name of Belmont-Broye.
the municipalities Autafond and Belfaux merged under the name of Belfaux.
the municipalities Corpataux-Magnedens, Farvagny, Le Glèbe, Rossens and Vuisternens-en-Ogoz merged under the name of Gibloux.
the municipalities Bas-Vully and Haut-Vully merged under the name of Mont-Vully.

As of 1 January 2017
the municipalities Bussy, Estavayer-le-Lac, Morens, Murist, Rueyres-les-Prés, Vuissens and Vernay merged under the name of Estavayer.
the municipalities Châbles and Cheyres merged under the name of Cheyres-Châbles.
the municipalities Surpierre and Villeneuve merged under the name of Surpierre.
the municipalities Chésopelloz and Corminboeuf merged under the name of Corminboeuf.
the municipalities Barberêche, Courtepin, Villarepos and Wallenried merged under the name of Courtepin.
the municipalities Oberschrot, Plaffeien and Zumholz merged under the name of Plaffeien.

As of 1 January 2020
the municipalities La Folliaz and Villaz-Saint-Pierre merged under the name of Villaz
the municipalities Corserey, Noréaz and Prez-vers-Noréaz merged under the name of Prez

As of 1 January 2021
the municipalities Alterswil, St. Antoni and Tafers merged under the name of Tafers
the municipalities Arconciel, Ependes and Senèdes merged under the name of Bois-d'Amont
the municipalities Cheiry and Surpierre merged under the name of Surpierre

As of 1 January 2022
the municipalities Galmiz, Gempenach and Murten merged under the name of Murten
the municipalities Clavaleyres (BE) and Murten merged under the name of Murten

As of 1 January 2025
the municipalities Auboranges, Chapelle, Écublens and Rue merged under the name of Rue
the municipalities Montet and Ursy merged under the name of Ursy
the municipalities Grolley and Ponthaux merged under the name of Grolley-Ponthaux

As of 1 January 2026
the municipalities Gurmels and Ulmiz merged under the name of Gurmels
the municipalities Fétigny and Ménières merged under the name of Fétigny-Ménières
