= La Neirigue =

Former municipality, canton of Fribourg

- Former municipality
- Coat of arms
- Location of La Neirigue
- Location within Switzerland Location within Canton of Fribourg
- Coordinates: 46.683339°N 6.950003°E
- Country: Switzerland
- Canton: Fribourg
- District: Glâne
- Municipality: Vuisternens-devant-Romont

Population (2000)
  - Total: 50
- Time zone: UTC+01:00 (CET)
  - Summer (DST): UTC+02:00 (CEST)
- SFOS number: 2092
- ISO 3166 code: CH-FR
- Website

La Neirigue is a village and former municipality in the Glâne district of the canton of Fribourg, Switzerland. Since 2004 it has been part of the municipality of Vuisternens-devant-Romont. It lies at the bottom of the valley of the Neirigue, a tributary of the Glâne.

== History ==
La Neirigue is first mentioned in 930 as Nigra aqua. In that year the abbey of Saint-Maurice d'Agaune ceded land at La Neirigue to Turimbert. From the 12th century La Neirigue was part of the lordship of Grangettes, which was attached to the bailiwick of Romont (1536–1798) and then to the district of the same name (1798–1848). The village was devastated by the plague in 1611.

In church matters La Neirigue left the parish of Vuisternens-devant-Romont in 1956 and joined that of Berlens. A chapel dedicated to Saint Garin, founded in 1651 and rebuilt in 1735, is a place of regional pilgrimage.

A former gravel pit was turned into a pond in 1983. There is a joinery. Fodder crops are grown and livestock is raised; there were five farms in 2000. La Neirigue had 79 inhabitants in 1811, 100 in 1850, 88 in 1900, 87 in 1950 and 50 in 2000. In 2004 it became part of the municipality of Vuisternens-devant-Romont.

== Bibliography ==
- A. Dellion, Dictionnaire historique et statistique des paroisses catholiques du canton de Fribourg, 1884–1902, 12, 257–258
- La Liberté, 4 January 1986; 15 September 1988
