= Le Saulgy =

Former municipality, canton of Fribourg

- Former municipality
- Location of Le Saulgy
- Location within Switzerland Location within Canton of Fribourg
- Coordinates: 46.650006°N 6.850005°E
- Country: Switzerland
- Canton: Fribourg
- District: Glâne
- Municipality: Siviriez

Population (1970)
  - Total: 58
- Time zone: UTC+01:00 (CET)
  - Summer (DST): UTC+02:00 (CEST)
- SFOS number: 2098
- ISO 3166 code: CH-FR
- Website

Le Saulgy is a former municipality in the Glâne district of the canton of Fribourg, Switzerland. Since 1978 it has been part of the municipality of Siviriez, together with Villaranon. It lies on the high plateau between the upper valleys of the Broye and the Glâne.

== History ==
Le Saulgy was formerly a small noble fief, acquired in 1536 by the government of Fribourg. In church matters, it has always belonged to the parish of Siviriez. It was part of the bailiwick of Romont and then, from 1798 to 1848, of the district of Romont. At the beginning of the 21st century Le Saulgy was still agricultural.

Le Saulgy had 57 inhabitants in 1811, 69 in 1850, 73 in 1900, 73 in 1950 and 58 in 1970. In 1978 it became part of the municipality of Siviriez.
