= Glane =

Glane or Glâne may refer to:

- Glâne District, a district in the canton of Fribourg, Switzerland
- Glâne (river), a river in Switzerland that crosses part of the Canton of Fribourg
- Glane, Overijssel, a populated area in the municipality of Losser, Overijssel, Netherlands
- a district of Bad Iburg, in the district of Osnabrück, in Lower Saxony, Germany
- a river in Oradour-sur-Glane (commune), Haute-Vienne, France
- Glane (Ems), a river of North Rhine-Westphalia, Germany

== See also ==
- Glan (disambiguation)
