= Prez-vers-Siviriez =

Former municipality, canton of Fribourg

- Former municipality
- Coat of arms
- Location of Prez-vers-Siviriez
- Location within Switzerland Location within Canton of Fribourg
- Coordinates: 46.63334°N 6.866667°E
- Country: Switzerland
- Canton: Fribourg
- District: Glâne
- Municipality: Siviriez

Population (2000)
  - Total: 271
- Time zone: UTC+01:00 (CET)
  - Summer (DST): UTC+02:00 (CEST)
- ISO 3166 code: CH-FR
- Website

Prez-vers-Siviriez is a former municipality in the Glâne district of the canton of Fribourg, Switzerland. In 2004 it merged, together with Chavannes-les-Forts and Villaraboud, into the municipality of Siviriez. It is the village furthest up the valley of the Glâne, with scattered settlement in two hamlets, Prez and Les Chaussets.

== History ==
Prez-vers-Siviriez is first mentioned in 1145 as de Praels, and in 1227 as Preez. Remains of a Bronze Age settlement have been found at La Montaneire.

The de Prez family, recorded from the 13th century, died out in the 17th century. The history of Prez is linked to that of the lordship of Rue, to which it belonged from the 12th century. It was attached to the bailiwick of Rue (1536–1798) and then to the prefecture of Rue (1798–1848). The chapel of the Holy Cross (Sainte-Croix), built in 1770, belongs to the parish of Siviriez.

Lying at the far end of a formerly marshy valley, Prez remained apart from industrial development despite the construction of the Lausanne–Bern railway in 1862. The economy centers on agriculture and forestry (16 farms in 2000), and there is an electromechanical workshop. Since 1985 the village has been turning into a residential municipality; in 2000 nearly two thirds of the working population commuted, mainly to Romont.

Prez-vers-Siviriez had 219 inhabitants in 1811, 319 in 1850, 351 in 1900, 336 in 1950, 187 in 1980 and 271 in 2000. In 2004 it became part of the municipality of Siviriez.

== Bibliography ==
- G. Bourquenoud, "Prez-vers-Siviriez, un village sur la voie du progrès", in Fribourg illustré, 1985, no. 18, 35–39
- D. Baudais et al., Prez-vers-Siviriez "La Montaneire", 2003
