= Estévenens =

Former municipality, canton of Fribourg

- Former municipality
- Location of Estévenens
- Location within Switzerland Location within Canton of Fribourg
- Coordinates: 46.66667°N 6.949997°E
- Country: Switzerland
- Canton: Fribourg
- District: Glâne
- Municipality: Vuisternens-devant-Romont

Population (2000)
  - Total: 123
- Time zone: UTC+01:00 (CET)
  - Summer (DST): UTC+02:00 (CEST)
- SFOS number: 2075
- ISO 3166 code: CH-FR
- Website

Estévenens is a former municipality in the Glâne district of the canton of Fribourg, Switzerland. Since 2003 it has been part of the municipality of Vuisternens-devant-Romont. It lies on the right bank of the Neirigue.

== History ==
Estévenens is first mentioned in 1403 as Estevenes. A large Gallo-Roman settlement, at the place called Côte à Maillan, was first mentioned in 1886. Estévenens belonged to the counts of Gruyère. It passed to Count Philip I of Savoy in 1274, to Boniface de Châtillon in 1341, then to Aymon de Corbières, and in 1363 to François de Combremont. The lordship, a fief of the House of Savoy, later belonged to the Dompierre family and then to the Bussy family. In 1536 Estévenens became a subject territory of Fribourg, and until 1848 it belonged to the bailiwick, and later the district, of Romont.

In church matters Estévenens has always belonged to the parish of Vuisternens-devant-Romont. The municipality issued statutes in 1807 and 1841. After the municipal council (the executive) resigned, the municipality was placed under the supervision of the canton in 2000. In 2002 it voted to merge with seven neighboring municipalities, and since 2003 it has been part of Vuisternens-devant-Romont.

Estévenens has remained agricultural, with livestock farming and dairy production. It had 199 inhabitants in 1811, 188 in 1850, 235 in 1870, 192 in 1900, 186 in 1950, 116 in 1980 and 123 in 2000.

== Bibliography ==
- A. Dellion, Dictionnaire historique et statistique des paroisses catholiques du canton de Fribourg, 1884–1902, 12, 256
