= Sommentier =

Former municipality, canton of Fribourg

- Former municipality
- Coat of arms
- Location of Sommentier
- Location within Switzerland Location within Canton of Fribourg
- Coordinates: 46.633337°N 6.916671°E
- Country: Switzerland
- Canton: Fribourg
- District: Glâne
- Municipality: Vuisternens-devant-Romont

Population (2000)
  - Total: 234
- Time zone: UTC+01:00 (CET)
  - Summer (DST): UTC+02:00 (CEST)
- ISO 3166 code: CH-FR
- Website

Sommentier is a village and former municipality in the Glâne district of the canton of Fribourg, Switzerland. Since 2003 it has been part of the municipality of Vuisternens-devant-Romont.

== History ==
Sommentier is first mentioned in 1247 as Somentier. In 1262 Rodolphe d'Ecublens sold estates at Sommentier to Peter II of Savoy. In the 13th century the Cistercians of Hautcrêt and Hauterive owned property there. After it came under the rule of Fribourg in 1536, the village belonged to the bailiwick of Romont, and then to the districts of Rue (1798–1803), Romont (1803–1848) and Glâne (from 1848).

In church matters Sommentier belonged to the parish of Vuisternens-devant-Romont until 1934, and then formed a parish with Lieffrens. The chapel of Saint Anne was built in 1918–1920 and the parish church in 1933–1934. Sommentier has kept its rural character, with livestock farming and fodder crops.

Sommentier had 177 inhabitants in 1811, 212 in 1850, 274 in 1900, 276 in 1950 and 234 in 2000. In 2003 it became part of the municipality of Vuisternens-devant-Romont.

== Bibliography ==
- La Liberté, 4 August 1983
- La Gruyère, 26 July 1988

=== Archives ===
- Archives de l'État de Fribourg, Fribourg (card index)
