= Villariaz =

Former municipality, canton of Fribourg

- Former municipality
- Coat of arms
- Location of Villariaz
- Location within Switzerland Location within Canton of Fribourg
- Coordinates: 46.66667°N 6.933336°E
- Country: Switzerland
- Canton: Fribourg
- District: Glâne
- Municipality: Vuisternens-devant-Romont

Population (2000)
  - Total: 357
- Time zone: UTC+01:00 (CET)
  - Summer (DST): UTC+02:00 (CEST)
- ISO 3166 code: CH-FR
- Website

Villariaz is a village and former municipality in the Glâne district of the canton of Fribourg, Switzerland, at the western foot of the Gibloux. Since 2003 it has been part of the municipality of Vuisternens-devant-Romont.

== History ==
Villariaz is first mentioned in 1148 as Vilar Roart. In that year Guido d'Ependes gave his allod of Villariaz to the monastery of Hauterive. The lordship of Villariaz belonged to noble families of the Pays de Vaud and of Burgundy, and then to patrician families of Fribourg. The lords or co-lords of Villariaz came from the Norma, Vuisternens, Palézieux, Nicod, Fallerand, Praroman, Empsis, Challant, Ratzé, König, Gottrau and Reynaud families.

Under the suzerainty of the House of Savoy, and from 1536 of Fribourg, Villariaz came under the bailiwick of Romont, and from 1798 to 1848 under the district of the same name. The village has always been part of the parish of Vuisternens-devant-Romont. Long agricultural, with fodder crops and livestock farming, the village is taking on a residential character.

Villariaz had 142 inhabitants in 1811, 201 in 1850, 240 in 1900, 238 in 1950 and 357 in 2000. In 2003 it became part of the municipality of Vuisternens-devant-Romont.

== Bibliography ==
- L. Genoud, "Villariaz et les de Vuicherens", in Revue de la Suisse catholique, 8, 1876–1877, 486–527
- Fribourg illustré, 10, 1979, 5–11
- E. Crettaz-Stürzel, "Wegkreuze", in Patrimoine fribourgeois, 1993, no. 2, 42–43
