= Joux (disambiguation) =

Joux is a commune in France.

Joux or de Joux may also refer to:

- Joux Valley, Switzerland
- Joux Lake, Switzerland
- JOUX-DTV 3kW, a channel of the Niigata Television Network 21
- La Joux, a frazione of La Thuile, Aosta Valley, Italy
- La Joux, Fribourg, a former municipality in the canton of Fribourg, Switzerland
- Antoine Joux (born 1967), French cryptographer
- Ferris de Joux (1935–2009), designer, engineer and constructor of sports cars
