= Villaranon =

Former municipality, canton of Fribourg

- Former municipality
- Location of Villaranon
- Location within Switzerland Location within Canton of Fribourg
- Coordinates: 46.666671°N 6.883328°E
- Country: Switzerland
- Canton: Fribourg
- District: Glâne
- Municipality: Siviriez

Population (1970)
  - Total: 56
- Time zone: UTC+01:00 (CET)
  - Summer (DST): UTC+02:00 (CEST)
- ISO 3166 code: CH-FR
- Website

Villaranon is a former municipality in the Glâne district of the canton of Fribourg, Switzerland. Since 1978 it has been part of the municipality of Siviriez, together with Le Saulgy.

== History ==
Unidentified Roman remains were reported in the 19th century. Villaranon formed a lordship that belonged to the de Dompierre family and then to a branch of the House of Estavayer, which took the name of Villaranon (1437–1472). Pierre de Bonvillars, styled lord of Villaranon in 1481, sold his lordship in 1483 to Jean, Pierre and André Maillard. The Bonvillars family held it again from 1505 to 1545; Villaranon then belonged in turn to the Chesaul, Progin and Brünisholz families before it was sold to Fribourg in 1728.

Villaranon was part of the bailiwick of Romont from 1536 and then of the district of the same name (1798–1848). It has always belonged to the parish of Siviriez (Siviriez-Villaraboud since 2007). Fodder and cereal crops are grown, and livestock is raised.

Villaranon had 82 inhabitants in 1811, 96 in 1850, 148 in 1888, 108 in 1900, 122 in 1950 and 56 in 1970. In 1978 it became part of the municipality of Siviriez.

== Bibliography ==
- A. Dellion, Dictionnaire historique et statistique des paroisses catholiques du canton de Fribourg, 11, 143–144
- J.-P. Anderegg, Une histoire du paysage fribourgeois, 2002, 268–273
