= Glan =

The word Glan meaning derives from Celtic (Noric) glanos meaning "bright, clear", cf. Glanis, Glanum, Glen and English "clean".

- Glan (Nahe), a river in Germany
- Glan, Sarangani, a municipality in Sarangani, Philippines
- Glan (Gurk), a river in Carinthia, Austria, tributary of the Gurk
- Glan (Nahe), a river in Rhineland-Palatinate, Germany, tributary of the Nahe
- Glan Cattle, a traditional cattle breed from the same area
- Glan (lake), a lake in Sweden near Norrköping
- Pentti Glan (1946–2017), Finnish-Canadian rock drummer

== See also ==
- Glan Valley Railway, Rhineland-Palatinate, Germany
- Glane (disambiguation)
- Sankt Veit an der Glan
