= La Magne =

Former municipality, canton of Fribourg

- Former municipality
- Coat of arms
- Location of La Magne
- Location within Switzerland Location within Canton of Fribourg
- Coordinates: 46.633341°N 6.933334°E
- Country: Switzerland
- Canton: Fribourg
- District: Glâne
- Municipality: Vuisternens-devant-Romont

Population (2000)
  - Total: 48
- Time zone: UTC+01:00 (CET)
  - Summer (DST): UTC+02:00 (CEST)
- ISO 3166 code: CH-FR
- Website

La Magne is a former municipality in the Glâne district of the canton of Fribourg, Switzerland. Since 2003 it has been part of the municipality of Vuisternens-devant-Romont. It is made up of scattered farms away from the road from Romont to Bulle.

== History ==
La Magne is first mentioned in 1364 as Alamania. It belonged to the bailiwick (1536–1798) and then the district (1798–1848) of Romont. In church matters the municipality has always belonged to the parish of Vuisternens-devant-Romont. It has an oratory of Notre-Dame-des-Petits-Marais.

La Magne has kept its agricultural character, with seven farms in 2000, mainly devoted to livestock farming and milk production. It has a dairy society, founded in 1946, and a cheese dairy. La Magne had 65 inhabitants in 1811, 78 in 1850, 80 in 1900, 69 in 1950, 34 in 1980 and 48 in 2000. In 2003 it became part of the municipality of Vuisternens-devant-Romont.

== Bibliography ==
- H. Jaccard, Essai de toponymie, 1906, 249 (reprinted 1985)
