= Mézières Castle =

Castle in Mézières, Switzerland

- Mézières
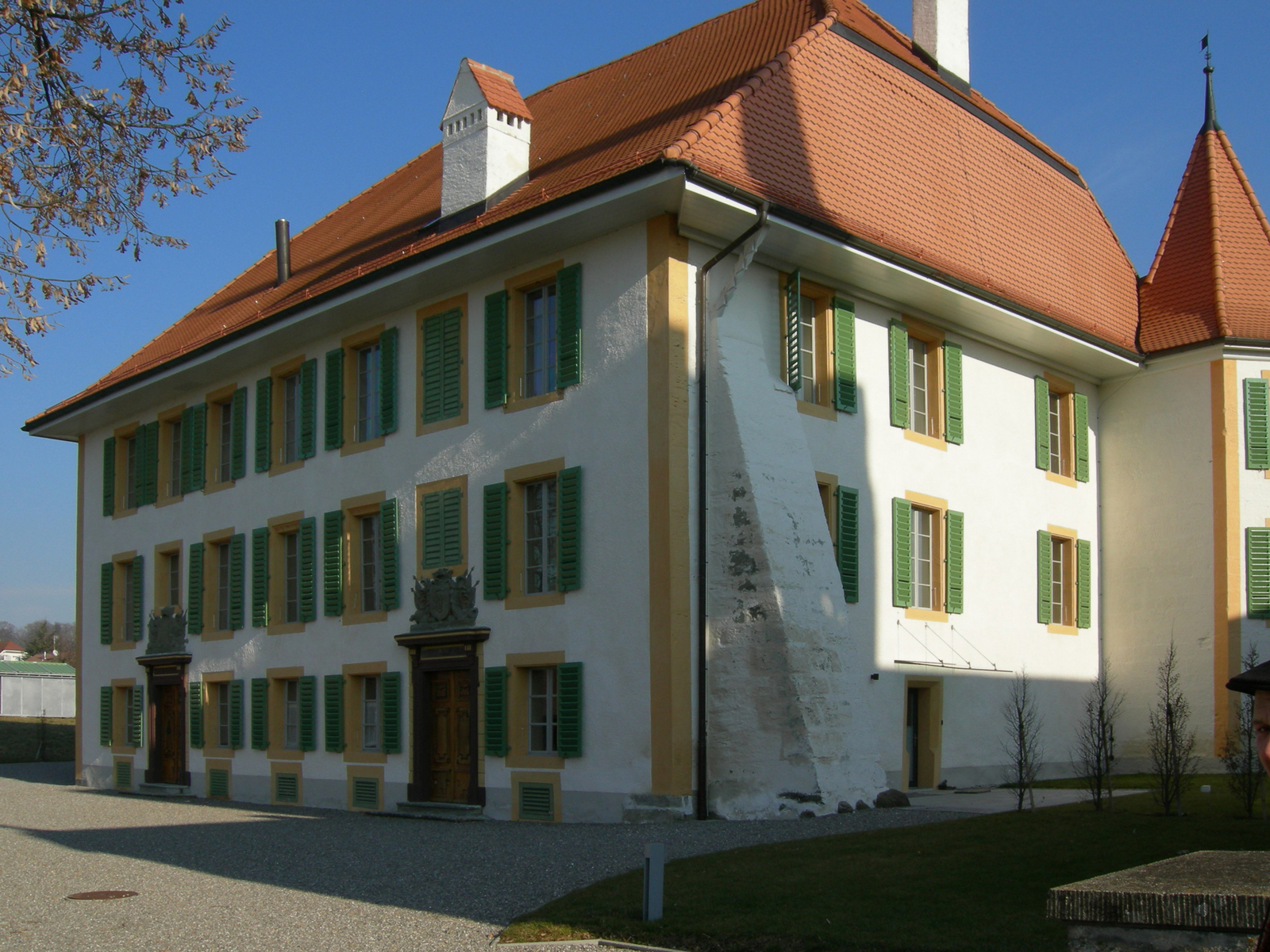
- Mézières Castle

Site information
- Code: CH-FR

Location
- Coordinates: 46°40′46″N 6°55′36″E

Mézières Castle is a castle in the municipality of Mézières of the Canton of Fribourg in Switzerland. It is a Swiss heritage site of national significance.

== See also ==
- List of castles in Switzerland
- Château
