= Villaraboud =

Former municipality, canton of Fribourg

- Former municipality
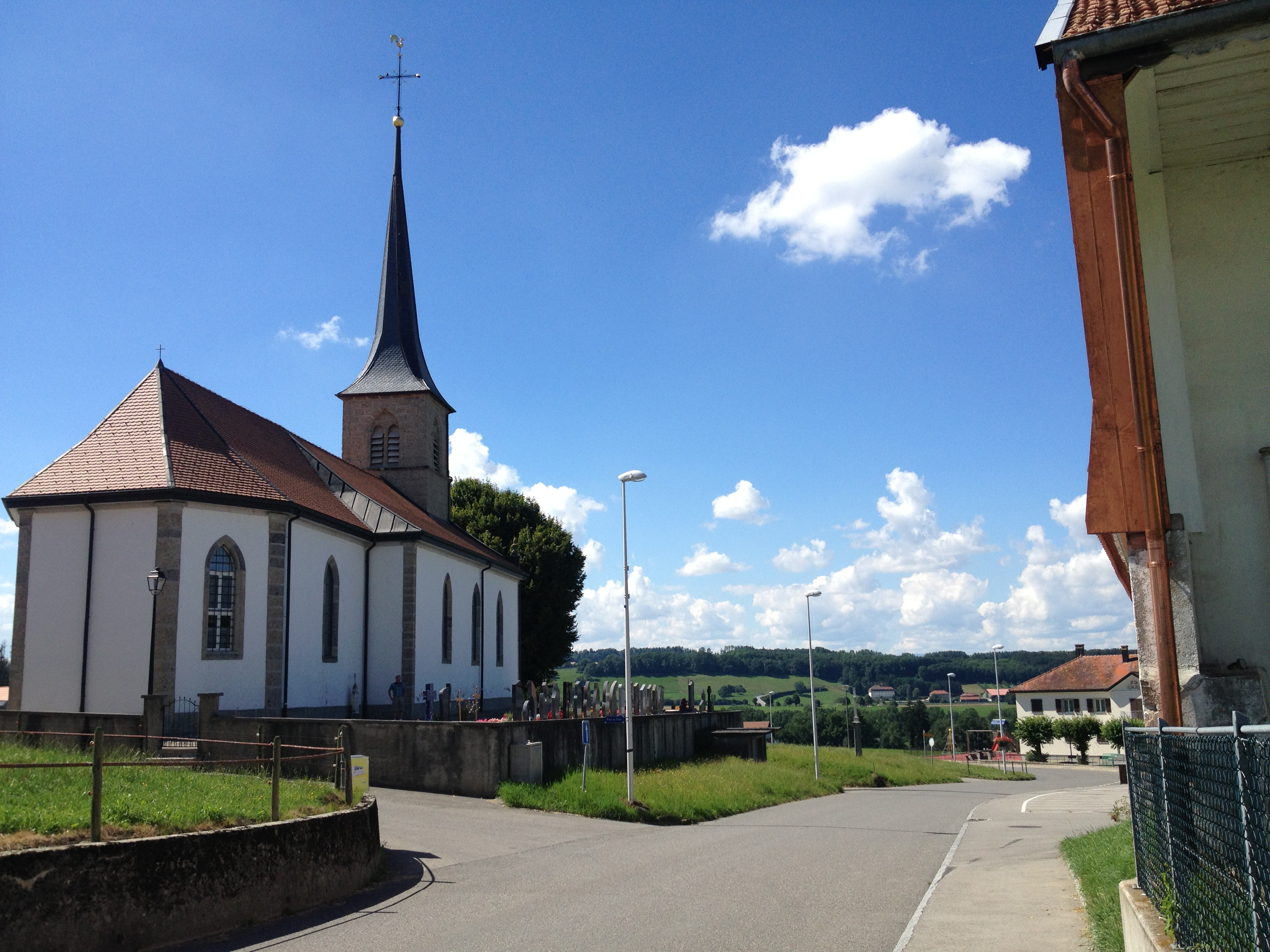

- Coat of arms
- Location of Villaraboud
- Location within Switzerland Location within Canton of Fribourg
- Coordinates: 46.666667°N 6.916663°E
- Country: Switzerland
- Canton: Fribourg
- District: Glâne
- Municipality: Siviriez

Population (2000)
  - Total: 265
- Time zone: UTC+01:00 (CET)
  - Summer (DST): UTC+02:00 (CEST)
- ISO 3166 code: CH-FR
- Website

Villaraboud is a former municipality in the Glâne district of the canton of Fribourg, Switzerland, between the Glâne and the Neirigue. Since 2004 it has been part of the municipality of Siviriez.

== History ==
Villaraboud is first mentioned in 1228 as Vilar Rabot. In 1262 Rodolphe, lord of Écublens, sold everything he owned in the village to Peter II of Savoy. From 1262 to 1536 the village belonged to various families who were vassals of the House of Savoy, among them the Challant in the 15th century and the Villarzel. Villaraboud was part of the Fribourg bailiwick of Romont from 1536 to 1798, of the district of Romont from 1798 to 1848, and of the Glâne district from 1848.

Villaraboud has been a parish since at least 1228. The advowson (droit de collation) belonged first to the Benedictine priory of Burier (near Vevey) and from 1536 to Fribourg. The present church of Saint-Laurent, built in 1868, replaced a sanctuary first mentioned in 1416. In 1804 the chapel of Notre-Dame du Bois, a popular place of pilgrimage, was built on the site of an 18th-century oratory that had served as a sanctuaire à répit (a shrine for the revival of stillborn children). A school was built in the first half of the 19th century on the site of the old presbytery.

Villaraboud had 7 hearths in 1453, and 247 inhabitants in 1850, 306 in 1900, 323 in 1950 and 265 in 2000. In 2000, 66% of the working population worked outside the municipality, which had remained agricultural. In 2004 Villaraboud became part of the municipality of Siviriez.

== Bibliography ==
- A. Dellion, Dictionnaire historique et statistique des paroisses catholiques du canton de Fribourg, 1884–1902, 12, 26–32
- R. Pally, Chronique Villaraboud spécial 700ème, 1991
