= Les Ecasseys =

Former municipality, canton of Fribourg

- Former municipality
- Location of Les Ecasseys
- Location within Switzerland Location within Canton of Fribourg
- Coordinates: 46.616668°N 6.916662°E
- Country: Switzerland
- Canton: Fribourg
- District: Glâne
- Municipality: Vuisternens-devant-Romont

Population (2000)
  - Total: 50
- Time zone: UTC+01:00 (CET)
  - Summer (DST): UTC+02:00 (CEST)
- ISO 3166 code: CH-FR
- Website

Les Ecasseys is a village and former municipality in the canton of Fribourg, Switzerland. It belonged to the Glâne district from 1848, and since 2003 it has been part of the municipality of Vuisternens-devant-Romont.

== History ==
Les Ecasseys is first mentioned in 1427 as es Escace. In the Middle Ages the village belonged to the lordship of Rue. It was then incorporated into the bailiwick of Rue (1536–1798) and into the district of the same name (1798–1848). The large estate called Fort Lambert or Lamberg, which covered two-thirds of the municipal territory and was owned by the Lamberger family at the beginning of the 17th century, was bequeathed around 1780 by the Vonderweid family to the church of Notre-Dame in Fribourg to pay for the church's repair.

Les Ecasseys belonged to the parish of Vuisternens-devant-Romont. It was partly separated from that parish in 1665 and attached to the parish of Le Crêt in 1845–1847.

Peat was extracted in the 19th and early 20th centuries; its main customer was the glassworks of Semsales. The farm of Le Lacran, one of the last two farms in the canton with the right to make Gruyère cheese outside a dairy society or an alpine chalet, stopped making it in 1989. The village's economy is based on milk production.

Les Ecasseys had 75 inhabitants in 1811, 86 in 1850, 92 in 1880, 77 in 1900, 77 in 1950, 40 in 1990 and 50 in 2000. In 2003 it became part of the municipality of Vuisternens-devant-Romont.

== Bibliography ==
- La Gruyère, 6 June 1989; 1 July 1989
