= Lieffrens =

Former municipality, canton of Fribourg

- Former municipality
- Location of Lieffrens
- Location within Switzerland Location within Canton of Fribourg
- Coordinates: 46.633341°N 6.899994°E
- Country: Switzerland
- Canton: Fribourg
- District: Glâne
- Municipality: Vuisternens-devant-Romont

Population (2000)
  - Total: 59
- Time zone: UTC+01:00 (CET)
  - Summer (DST): UTC+02:00 (CEST)
- ISO 3166 code: CH-FR
- Website

Lieffrens is a village and former municipality in the canton of Fribourg, Switzerland. It belonged to the Glâne district from 1848, and since 2003 it has been part of the municipality of Vuisternens-devant-Romont. It is made up of isolated farms in the upper Glâne area (Haute-Glâne), away from the transport routes.

== History ==
Lieffrens is first mentioned in 1147 as Leifres, and in the 12th century as Lenfrens. In the Middle Ages it was part of the lordship of Rue. It was then incorporated into the bailiwick of Rue (1536–1798), and into the districts of Romont (1798–1803), Rue (1803–1830) and again Romont (1831–1848). A family of Lieffrens is recorded in the 14th and 15th centuries.

A document of 1247 mentions a church at Lieffrens, which may have been the seat of the parish before the parish was moved to Vuisternens-devant-Romont at an unknown date. Since 1934 Lieffrens has formed a parish with Sommentier. The oratory of Notre-Dame du Rosaire was restored in 1993.

The village has kept its rural character, with crop farming, livestock farming and milk production. Lieffrens had 58 inhabitants in 1811, 90 in 1850, 116 in 1900, 95 in 1950 and 59 in 2000. In 2003 it became part of the municipality of Vuisternens-devant-Romont.

== Bibliography ==
- A. Dellion, Dictionnaire historique et statistique des paroisses catholiques du canton de Fribourg, 1884–1902, 12, 240, 256
