= La Joux, Fribourg =

Former municipality, canton of Fribourg

La Joux
- Former municipality
- Church of La Joux

- Coat of arms
- Location of La Joux
- Location within Switzerland Location within Canton of Fribourg
- Coordinates: 46.633341°N 6.933334°E
- Country: Switzerland
- Canton: Fribourg
- District: Glâne
- Municipality: Vuisternens-devant-Romont

Population (2000)
  - Total: 354
- Time zone: UTC+01:00 (CET)
  - Summer (DST): UTC+02:00 (CEST)
- ISO 3166 code: CH-FR
- Website

La Joux is a village and former municipality in the Glâne district of the canton of Fribourg, Switzerland. Since 2003 it has been part of the municipality of Vuisternens-devant-Romont. It lies near the road from Romont to Bulle.

== History ==
La Joux is first mentioned in 1301 as Jour. From 1536 to 1798 it belonged to the bailiwick of Rue, and then to the district of the same name until 1848.

La Joux belonged to the parish of Vuisternens-devant-Romont. In 1720 it was given a chaplaincy, thanks to gifts from Jean Pittet and his wife. The chapel of Saint John the Baptist, built in 1729, was enlarged at the end of the 18th century; the chaplains were responsible for teaching. La Joux became a parish in 1886, and a new church was built between 1902 and 1905.

The village has kept its rural character, with livestock farming and fodder crops, although in 2000 commuters made up almost half of the working population. La Joux had 338 inhabitants in 1811, 421 in 1850, 458 in 1900, 391 in 1950 and 354 in 2000. In 2003 it became part of the municipality of Vuisternens-devant-Romont.

== Bibliography ==
- A. Dellion, Dictionnaire historique et statistique des paroisses catholiques du canton de Fribourg, 1884–1902, 7–8, 150–165
- La Liberté, 28 April 1976
- Centenaire de la Paroisse de La Joux, 1886–1986, 1986
