= Le Châtelard, Fribourg =

Le Châtelard
- Municipality
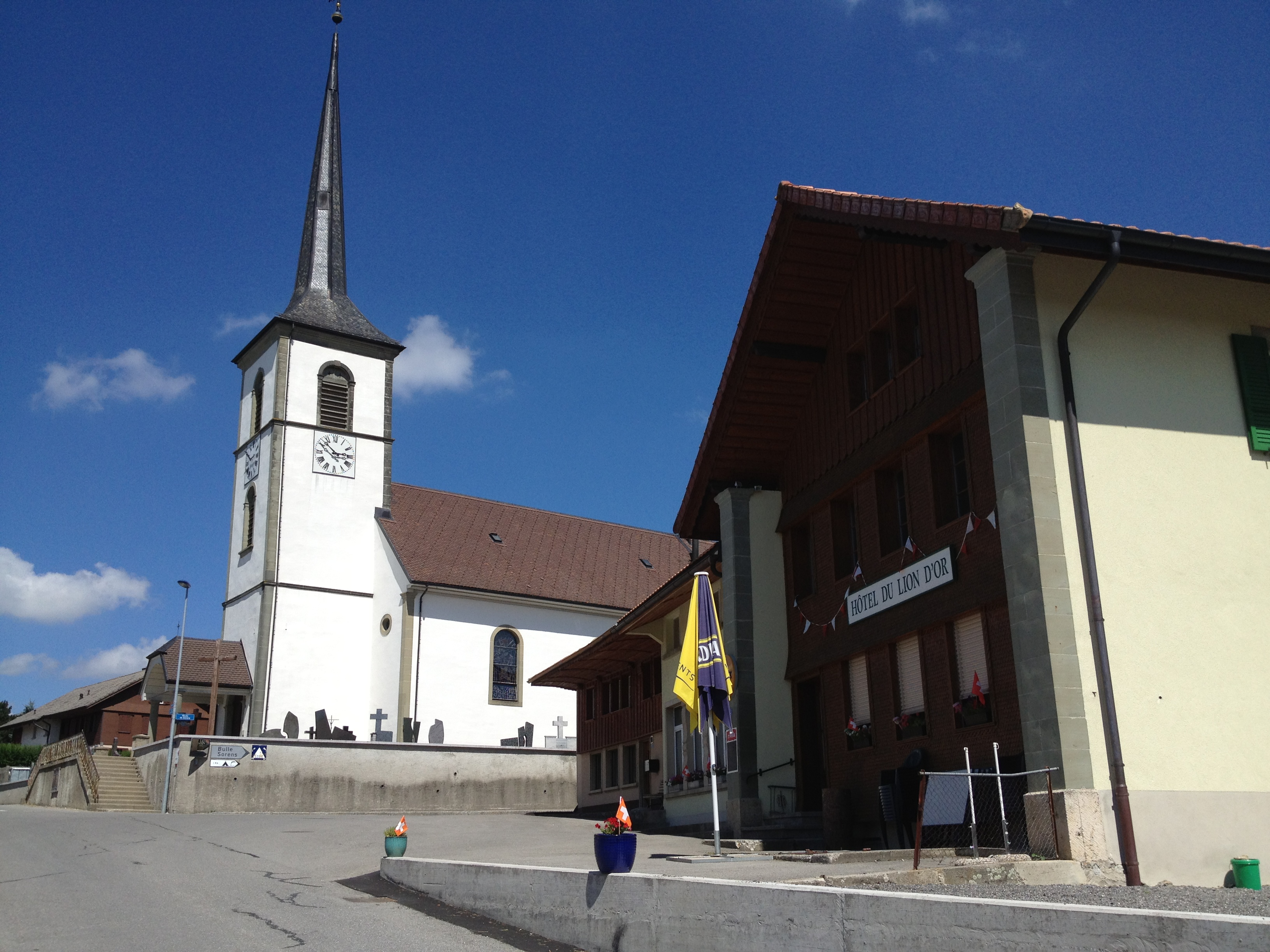

- Flag Coat of arms
- Location of Le Châtelard
- Location within Switzerland Location within Canton of Fribourg
- Coordinates: 46°41′N 6°59′E
- Country: Switzerland
- Canton: Fribourg
- District: Glâne

Government
  - Mayor: Syndic

Area
  - Total: 7.48 km^{2} (2.89 sq mi)
- Elevation: 903 m (2,963 ft)

Population (December 2020)
  - Total: 349
  - Density: 46.7/km^{2} (121/sq mi)
- Time zone: UTC+01:00 (CET)
  - Summer (DST): UTC+02:00 (CEST)
- Postal code: 1689
- SFOS number: 2067
- ISO 3166 code: CH-FR
- Surrounded by: Grangettes, Marsens, Massonnens, Sorens, Villorsonnens
- Website: www.le-chatelard.ch

Le Châtelard (French: [lə ʃɑtlaʁ]; Arpitan: Châthelâr, locally Tsathèlâ [tsaθeˈlɑ]) is a municipality in the district of Glâne in the canton of Fribourg in Switzerland.

== Geography ==
Le Châtelard has an area, as of 2009, of 7.5 square kilometers (2.9 mi^{2}). Of this area, 5.24 km^{2} (2.02 mi^{2}) or 69.8% is used for agricultural purposes, while 2 km^{2} (0.77 mi^{2}) or 26.6% is forested. Of the rest of the land, 0.24 km^{2} (0.093 mi^{2}) or 3.2% is settled (buildings or roads).

Of the built up area, housing and buildings made up 1.3% and transportation infrastructure made up 1.5%. Out of the forested land, 25.4% of the total land area is heavily forested and 1.2% is covered with orchards or small clusters of trees. Of the agricultural land, 14.4% is used for growing crops and 55.0% is pastures.

The municipality is located on the south-west flank of the Gibloux. It consists of the village of Le Châtelard and the hamlets of Le Planet and Planafaye.

== Coat of arms ==
The blazon of the municipal coat of arms is Chequy of Nine Or and Azure.

== Demographics ==
Le Châtelard has a population (as of December 2020) of 349. As of 2008, 0.9% of the population are resident foreign nationals. Over the last 10 years (2000–2010) the population has changed at a rate of 1.4%. Migration accounted for 0.9%, while births and deaths accounted for 1.2%.

Most of the population (as of 2000) speaks French (325 or 97.9%) as their first language, Portuguese is the second most common (4 or 1.2%) and German is the third (2 or 0.6%).

As of 2008, the population was 50.1% male and 49.9% female. The population was made up of 171 Swiss men (49.6% of the population) and 2 (0.6%) non-Swiss men. There were 170 Swiss women (49.3%) and 2 (0.6%) non-Swiss women. Of the population in the municipality, 195 or about 58.7% were born in Le Châtelard and lived there in 2000. There were 97 or 29.2% who were born in the same canton, while 25 or 7.5% were born somewhere else in Switzerland, and 11 or 3.3% were born outside of Switzerland.

The age distribution, as of 2000, in Le Châtelard is; 48 children or 14.5% of the population are between 0 and 9 years old and 40 teenagers or 12.0% are between 10 and 19. Of the adult population, 32 people or 9.6% of the population are between 20 and 29 years old. 64 people or 19.3% are between 30 and 39, 40 people or 12.0% are between 40 and 49, and 34 people or 10.2% are between 50 and 59. The senior population distribution is 34 people or 10.2% of the population are between 60 and 69 years old, 28 people or 8.4% are between 70 and 79, there are 11 people or 3.3% who are between 80 and 89, and there is 1 person who is 90 and older.

As of 2000, there were 153 people who were single and never married in the municipality. There were 148 married individuals, 21 widows or widowers and 10 individuals who are divorced.

As of 2000, there were 117 private households in the municipality, and an average of 2.8 persons per household. There were 31 households that consist of only one person and 21 households with five or more people. In 2000, a total of 113 apartments (88.3% of the total) were permanently occupied, while 11 apartments (8.6%) were seasonally occupied and 4 apartments (3.1%) were empty. As of 2009, the construction rate of new housing units was 5.7 new units per 1000 residents. The vacancy rate for the municipality, in 2010, was 0.69%.

The historical population is given in the following chart:

== Politics ==
In the 2011 federal election the most popular party was the SVP which received 35.1% of the vote. The next three most popular parties were the FDP (21.4%), the CVP (19.7%) and the SP (11.8%).

The SVP received about the same percentage of the vote as they did in the 2007 Federal election (33.7% in 2007 vs 35.1% in 2011). The FDP moved from third in 2007 (with 21.9%) to second in 2011, the CVP moved from second in 2007 (with 31.1%) to third and the SPS retained about the same popularity (7.7% in 2007). A total of 132 votes were cast in this election.

== Economy ==
As of 2010, Le Châtelard had an unemployment rate of 1.5%. As of 2008, there were 74 people employed in the primary economic sector and about 30 businesses involved in this sector. 11 people were employed in the secondary sector and there were 3 businesses in this sector. 30 people were employed in the tertiary sector, with 10 businesses in this sector. There were 155 residents of the municipality who were employed in some capacity, of which females made up 35.5% of the workforce.

In 2008 the total number of full-time equivalent jobs was 92. The number of jobs in the primary sector was 58, of which 52 were in agriculture and 5 were in forestry or lumber production. The number of jobs in the secondary sector was 9, all of which were in manufacturing. The number of jobs in the tertiary sector was 25. In the tertiary sector; 7 or 28.0% were in wholesale or retail sales or the repair of motor vehicles, 13 or 52.0% were in the movement and storage of goods, 2 or 8.0% were in a hotel or restaurant, 1 was in education.

In 2000, there were 7 workers who commuted into the municipality and 81 workers who commuted away. The municipality is a net exporter of workers, with about 11.6 workers leaving the municipality for every one entering. Of the working population, 5.8% used public transportation to get to work, and 50.3% used a private car.

== Religion ==
From the 2000 census, 308 or 92.8% were Roman Catholic, while 6 or 1.8% belonged to the Swiss Reformed Church. Of the rest of the population, there were 4 individuals (or about 1.20% of the population) who belonged to another Christian church. There were 4 (or about 1.20% of the population) who were Islamic. There were 1 individual who belonged to another church. 6 (or about 1.81% of the population) belonged to no church, are agnostic or atheist, and 5 individuals (or about 1.51% of the population) did not answer the question.

== Education ==
In Le Châtelard about 78 or (23.5%) of the population have completed non-mandatory upper secondary education, and 18 or (5.4%) have completed additional higher education (either university or a Fachhochschule). Of the 18 who completed tertiary schooling, 72.2% were Swiss men, 27.8% were Swiss women.

The Canton of Fribourg school system provides one year of non-obligatory Kindergarten, followed by six years of Primary school. This is followed by three years of obligatory lower Secondary school where the students are separated according to ability and aptitude. Following the lower Secondary students may attend a three or four year optional upper Secondary school. The upper Secondary school is divided into gymnasium (university preparatory) and vocational programs. After they finish the upper Secondary program, students may choose to attend a Tertiary school or continue their apprenticeship.

During the 2010-11 school year, there were a total of 35 students attending 2 classes in Le Châtelard. A total of 75 students from the municipality attended any school, either in the municipality or outside of it. There were no kindergarten classes in the municipality, but 6 students attended kindergarten in a neighboring municipality. The municipality had 2 primary classes and 35 students. During the same year, there were no lower secondary classes in the municipality, but 20 students attended lower secondary school in a neighboring municipality. There were no upper Secondary classes or vocational classes, but there were 7 upper Secondary students and 14 upper Secondary vocational students who attended classes in another municipality. The municipality had no non-university Tertiary classes, but there was one specialized Tertiary student who attended classes in another municipality.

As of 2000, there were 17 students in Le Châtelard who came from another municipality, while 27 residents attended schools outside the municipality.
