= Chavannes-les-Forts =

Former municipality, canton of Fribourg

- Former municipality
- Coat of arms
- Location of Chavannes-les-Forts
- Location within Switzerland Location within Canton of Fribourg
- Coordinates: 46.650001°N 6.899998°E
- Country: Switzerland
- Canton: Fribourg
- District: Glâne
- Municipality: Siviriez

Population (2000)
  - Total: 349
- Time zone: UTC+01:00 (CET)
  - Summer (DST): UTC+02:00 (CEST)
- ISO 3166 code: CH-FR
- Website

Chavannes-les-Forts is a former municipality in the Glâne district of the canton of Fribourg, Switzerland. Since 2004 it has been part of the municipality of Siviriez. It lies on the cantonal road from Romont to Lausanne and includes the hamlet of La Pierraz.

== History ==
Chavannes-les-Forts is recorded in 1247 as Chavanes. In 1262 the lords of Écublens sold it to Peter of Savoy. From 1536 to 1848 it belonged to the bailiwick, and later the district, of Romont. A chapel, a filial church of the parish of Siviriez, is mentioned in 1246; the present chapel, dedicated to Saint Nicholas, dates from 1733.

In 2000 the primary sector (livestock farming and milk production) provided a little under a third of the jobs in Chavannes-les-Forts, and more than half of the working inhabitants worked outside the municipality. Chavannes-les-Forts had 232 inhabitants in 1811, 314 in 1850, 428 in 1900, 312 in 1950, 274 in 1960, 354 in 1990 and 349 in 2000. In 2004 it became part of the municipality of Siviriez.

== Bibliography ==
- A. Dellion, Dictionnaire historique et statistique des paroisses catholiques du canton de Fribourg, 1884–1902, 11, 144–148
- G. Bourquenoud, "Villages de chez nous: Chavannes-les-Forts", in Fribourg illustré, 9, 1990, 39–44
