= Massonnens =

- Municipality
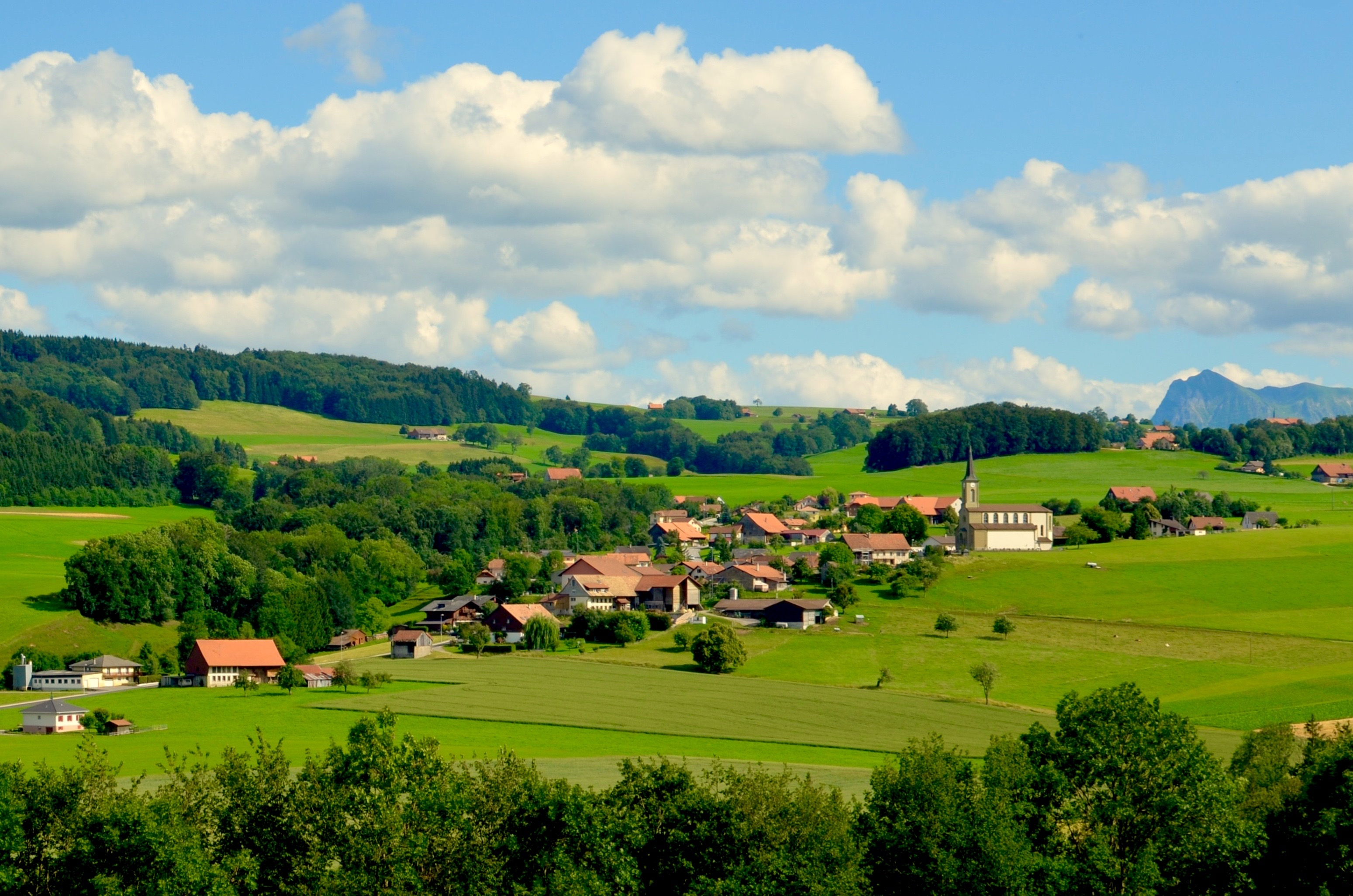

- Coat of arms
- Location of Massonnens
- Location within Switzerland Location within Canton of Fribourg
- Coordinates: 46°42′N 6°58′E
- Country: Switzerland
- Canton: Fribourg
- District: Glâne

Government
  - Mayor: Syndic

Area
  - Total: 4.3 km^{2} (1.7 sq mi)
- Elevation: 733 m (2,405 ft)

Population (December 2020)
  - Total: 548
  - Density: 130/km^{2} (330/sq mi)
- Time zone: UTC+01:00 (CET)
  - Summer (DST): UTC+02:00 (CEST)
- Postal code: 1692
- SFOS number: 2086
- ISO 3166 code: CH-FR
- Surrounded by: Grangettes, Le Châtelard, Mézières, Villaz-Saint-Pierre, Villorsonnens, Vuisternens-devant-Romont
- Website: www.massonnens.ch

Massonnens (French: [masɔnɑ̃s]; Arpitan: Massonens, locally Machenin pronounced [maʃuˈnɛ̃] or [maʃəˈnɛ̃]) is a municipality in the district of Glâne in the canton of Fribourg in Switzerland.

== History ==
Massonnens is first mentioned around 929-30 as Mansaningis or Massaningis.

== Geography ==
Massonnens has an area, as of 2009, of 4.3 square kilometers (1.7 mi^{2}). Of this area, 3.1 km^{2} (1.2 mi^{2}) or 72.9% is used for agricultural purposes, while 0.88 km^{2} (0.34 mi^{2}) or 20.7% is forested. Of the rest of the land, 0.26 km^{2} (0.10 mi^{2}) or 6.1% is settled (buildings or roads).

Of the built up area, housing and buildings made up 3.8% and transportation infrastructure made up 1.4%. Out of the forested land, 19.1% of the total land area is heavily forested and 1.6% is covered with orchards or small clusters of trees. Of the agricultural land, 35.5% is used for growing crops and 36.7% is pastures.

The municipality is located on a terrace above the right bank of the Neirigue. It consists of the village of Massonnens and the hamlet of Ferlens.

== Coat of arms ==
The blazon of the municipal coat of arms is Per fess, Gules, a Bend Or cottised Argent and of the second a Cross bottony of the first.

== Demographics ==
Massonnens has a population (as of December 2020) of 548. As of 2008, 4.7% of the population are resident foreign nationals. From 2000 to 2010, the population changed at a rate of 4.1%. Migration accounted for -2.4%, while births and deaths accounted for 3.4%.

Most of the population (as of 2000) speaks French (391 or 97.0%) as their first language, German is the second most common (7 or 1.7%) and Portuguese is the third (2 or 0.5%).

As of 2008, the population was 50.9% male and 49.1% female. The population was made up of 210 Swiss men (49.1% of the population) and 8 (1.9%) non-Swiss men. There were 205 Swiss women (47.9%) and 5 (1.2%) non-Swiss women. Of the population in the municipality, 218 or about 54.1% were born in Massonnens and lived there in 2000. There were 137 (34.0%) who were born in the same canton, while 25 (6.2%) were born somewhere else in Switzerland, and 17 (4.2%) were born outside of Switzerland.

The age distribution, as of 2000, in Massonnens is; 54 children (13.4% of the population) are between 0 and 9 years old and 85 teenagers (21.1%) are between 10 and 19. Of the adult population, 34 people (8.4% of the population) are between 20 and 29 years old. 65 people (16.1%) are between 30 and 39, 68 people or 16.9% are between 40 and 49, and 35 people (8.7%) are between 50 and 59. The senior population distribution is 28 people or 6.9% of the population are between 60 and 69 years old, 20 people (5.0%) are between 70 and 79, and 14 people (3.5%) who are between 80 and 89.

As of 2000, there were 196 people who were single and never married in the municipality. There were 184 married individuals, 16 widows or widowers and 7 individuals who are divorced.

As of 2000, there were 128 private households in the municipality, and an average of 3.1 persons per household. There were 24 households that consist of only one person and 31 households with five or more people. In 2000, a total of 127 apartments (90.7% of the total) were permanently occupied, while 8 apartments (5.7%) were seasonally occupied and 5 apartments (3.6%) were empty. As of 2009, the construction rate of new housing units was 11.6 new units per 1000 residents.

The historical population is given in the following chart:

== Heritage sites of national significance ==
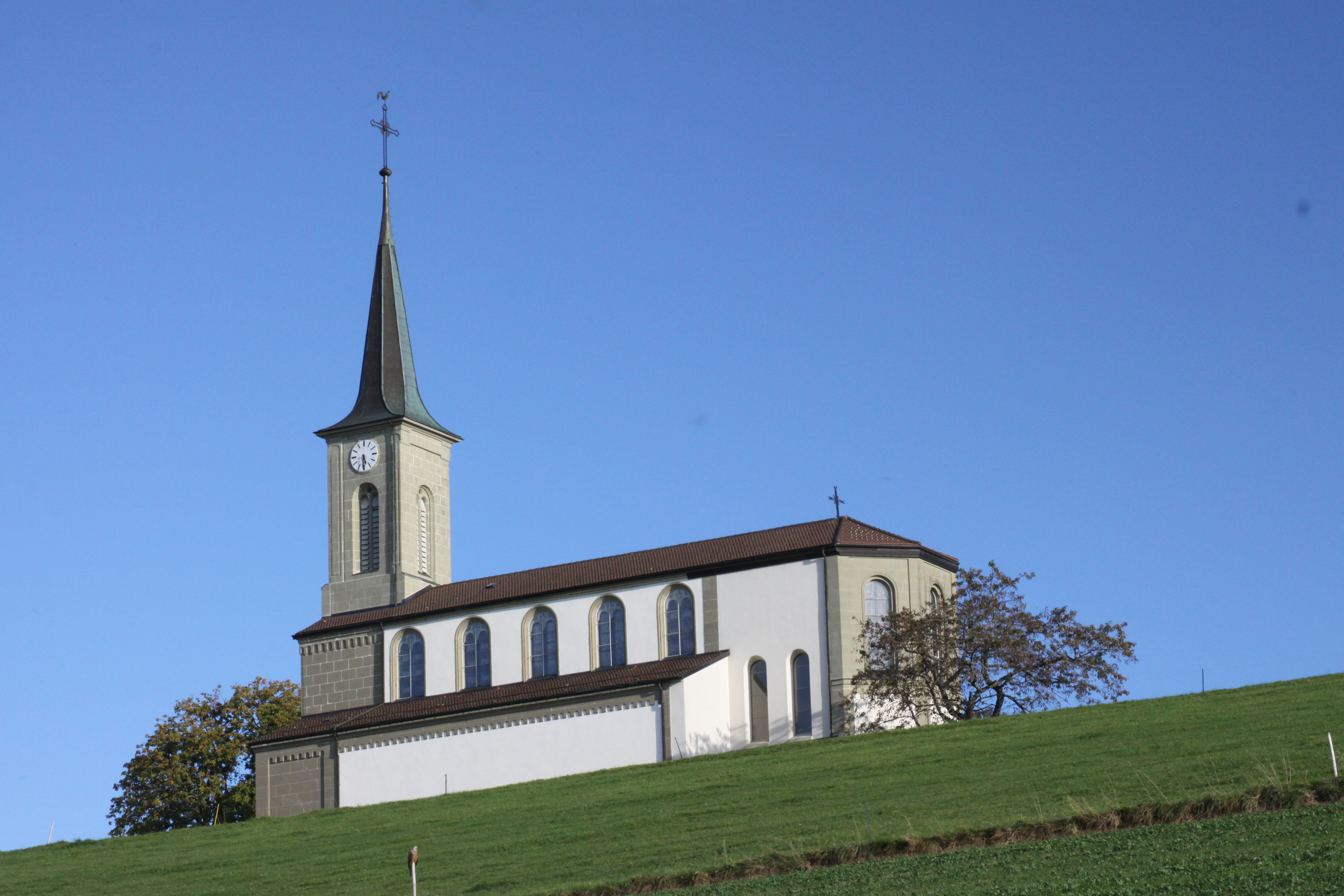
Saint-Maurice Church

The Saint-Maurice Church is listed as a Swiss heritage site of national significance.

== Politics ==
In the 2011 federal election the most popular party was the SVP which received 33.3% of the vote. The next three most popular parties were the SP (18.4%), the CVP (15.6%) and the FDP (14.0%).

The SVP received about the same percentage of the vote as they did in the 2007 Federal election (30.3% in 2007 vs 33.3% in 2011). The SPS moved from fourth in 2007 (with 14.9%) to second in 2011, the CVP retained about the same popularity (20.2% in 2007) and the FDP moved from second in 2007 (with 21.3%) to fourth. A total of 183 votes were cast in this election, of which 2 or 1.1% were invalid.

== Economy ==
As of 2010, Massonnens had an unemployment rate of 3%. As of 2008, there were 47 people employed in the primary economic sector and about 21 businesses involved in this sector. 19 people were employed in the secondary sector and there were 5 businesses in this sector. 25 people were employed in the tertiary sector, with 9 businesses in this sector. There were 185 residents of the municipality who were employed in some capacity, of which females made up 36.2% of the workforce.

In 2008 the total number of full-time equivalent jobs was 65. The number of jobs in the primary sector was 34, all of which were in agriculture. The number of jobs in the secondary sector was 15 of which 3 or (20.0%) were in manufacturing, 2 or (13.3%) were in mining and 10 (66.7%) were in construction. The number of jobs in the tertiary sector was 16. In the tertiary sector; 8 or 50.0% were in wholesale or retail sales or the repair of motor vehicles, 2 or 12.5% were in the movement and storage of goods, 3 or 18.8% were in a hotel or restaurant, 1 was a technical professional or scientist, 2 or 12.5% were in education.

In 2000, there were 11 workers who commuted into the municipality and 119 workers who commuted away. The municipality is a net exporter of workers, with about 10.8 workers leaving the municipality for every one entering. Of the working population, 3.2% used public transportation to get to work, and 62.2% used a private car.

== Religion ==
From the 2000 census, 355 or 88.1% were Roman Catholic, while 6 or 1.5% belonged to the Swiss Reformed Church. Of the rest of the population, there were 7 individuals (or about 1.74% of the population) who belonged to another Christian church. 28 (or about 6.95% of the population) belonged to no church, are agnostic or atheist, and 7 individuals (or about 1.74% of the population) did not answer the question.

== Education ==
In Massonnens about 125 or (31.0%) of the population have completed non-mandatory upper secondary education, and 23 or (5.7%) have completed additional higher education (either university or a Fachhochschule). Of the 23 who completed tertiary schooling, 73.9% were Swiss men, 17.4% were Swiss women.

The Canton of Fribourg school system provides one year of non-obligatory Kindergarten, followed by six years of Primary school. This is followed by three years of obligatory lower Secondary school where the students are separated according to ability and aptitude. Following the lower Secondary students may attend a three or four year optional upper Secondary school. The upper Secondary school is divided into gymnasium (university preparatory) and vocational programs. After they finish the upper Secondary program, students may choose to attend a Tertiary school or continue their apprenticeship.

During the 2010-11 school year, there were a total of 32 students attending 2 classes in Massonnens. A total of 74 students from the municipality attended any school, either in the municipality or outside of it. There was one kindergarten class with a total of 17 students in the municipality. The municipality had one primary class and 15 students. During the same year, there were no lower secondary classes in the municipality, but 15 students attended lower secondary school in a neighboring municipality. There were no upper Secondary classes or vocational classes, but there were 8 upper Secondary students and 15 upper Secondary vocational students who attended classes in another municipality. The municipality had no non-university Tertiary classes, but there were 3 non-university Tertiary students and 2 specialized Tertiary students who attended classes in another municipality.

As of 2000, there were 2 students in Massonnens who came from another municipality, while 52 residents attended schools outside the municipality.
