= Siviriez =

- Municipality
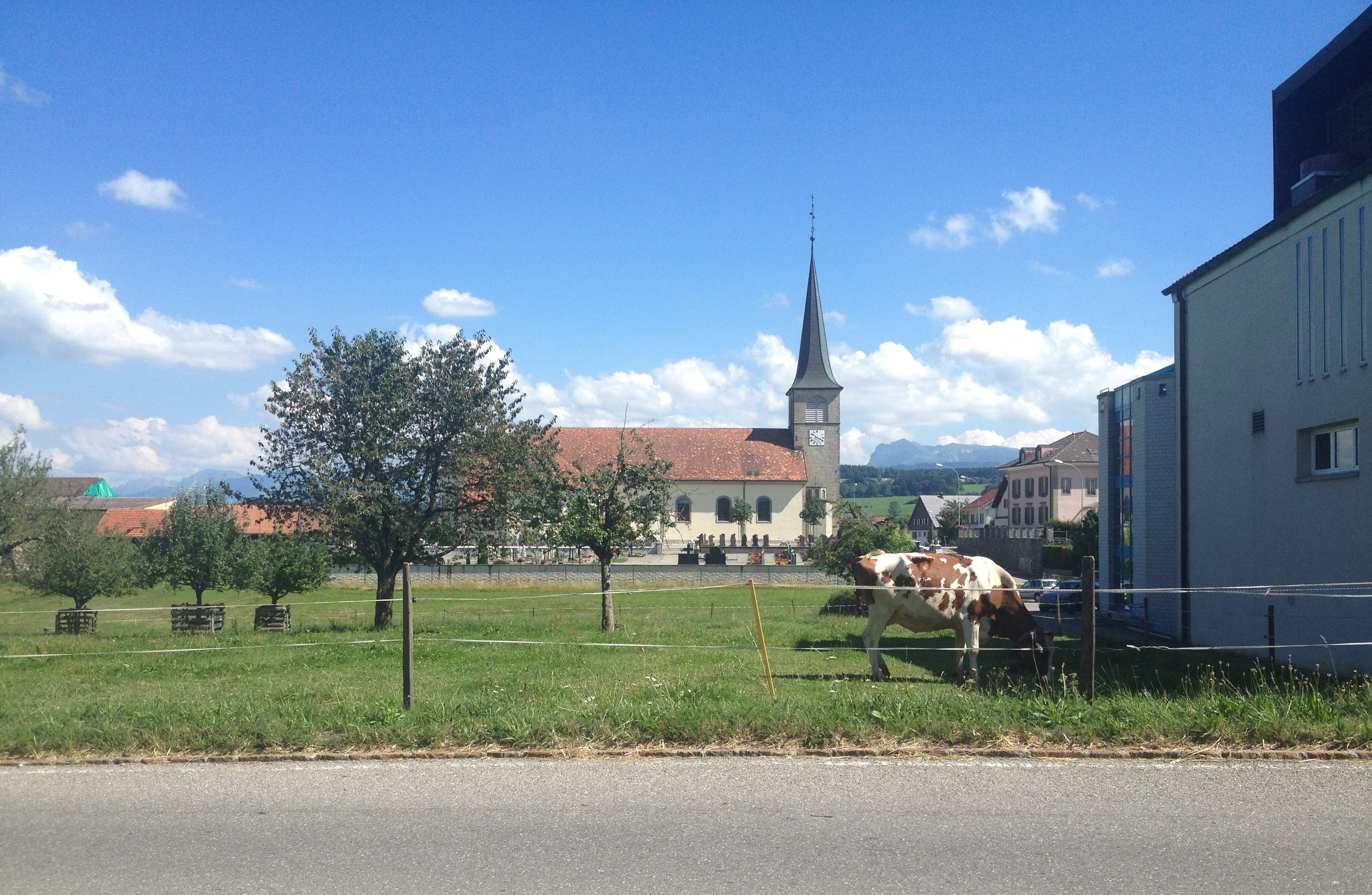

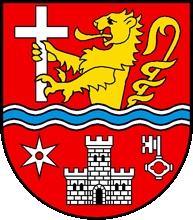
- Coat of arms
- Location of Siviriez
- Location within Switzerland Location within Canton of Fribourg
- Coordinates: 46°39′30″N 6°52′39″E
- Country: Switzerland
- Canton: Fribourg
- District: Glâne

Government
  - Mayor: Syndic

Area
  - Total: 20.27 km^{2} (7.83 sq mi)
- Elevation: 777 m (2,549 ft)

Population (December 2020)
  - Total: 2,346
  - Density: 115.7/km^{2} (299.8/sq mi)
- Time zone: UTC+01:00 (CET)
  - Summer (DST): UTC+02:00 (CEST)
- Postal code: 1678
- SFOS number: 2099
- ISO 3166 code: CH-FR
- Surrounded by: Billens-Hennens, Brenles (VD), Esmonts, Le Flon, Mézières, Romont, Ursy, Vuisternens-devant-Romont
- Website: www.siviriez.ch

Siviriez (French: [sivʁije]; Arpitan: Severié, locally Chuvri [ʃəvəˈʁi]) is a municipality in the district of Glâne in the canton of Fribourg in Switzerland.

== History ==
Siviriez is first mentioned in 1147 as Sivrie.

== Geography ==
Aerial view (1964)

Siviriez has an area, as of 2009, of 20.3 square kilometers (7.8 mi^{2}). Of this area, 15.1 km^{2} (5.8 mi^{2}) or 74.5% is used for agricultural purposes, while 3.48 km^{2} (1.34 mi^{2}) or 17.2% is forested. Of the rest of the land, 1.62 km^{2} (0.63 mi^{2}) or 8.0% is settled (buildings or roads), 0.04 km^{2} (9.9 acres) or 0.2% is either rivers or lakes and 0.05 km^{2} (12 acres) or 0.2% is unproductive land.

Of the built up area, housing and buildings made up 4.9% and transportation infrastructure made up 2.9%. Out of the forested land, 15.6% of the total land area is heavily forested and 1.6% is covered with orchards or small clusters of trees. Of the agricultural land, 29.4% is used for growing crops and 44.2% is pastures. All the water in the municipality is flowing water.

On 1 January 1978 the former municipalities of Villaranon and Le Saulgy merged into the municipality of Siviriez. In 2004 the former municipalities of Prez-vers-Siviriez, Villaraboud and Chavannes-les-Forts also merged into Siviriez.

== Coat of arms ==
The blazon of the municipal coat of arms is Gules, a Barrulet wavy Azure abased, overall a Semi Lion rampant Or issuant from coupeaux Argent and in chief two Mullets of the third pierced.

== Demographics ==
Siviriez has a population (as of December 2020) of 2,346. As of 2008, 9.3% of the population are resident foreign nationals. Over the last 10 years (2000–2010) the population has changed at a rate of 14.3%. Migration accounted for 13.5%, while births and deaths accounted for 1.6%.

Most of the population (as of 2000) speaks French (902 or 93.5%) as their first language, Portuguese is the second most common (26 or 2.7%) and German is the third (17 or 1.8%). There are 2 people who speak Italian.

As of 2008, the population was 50.4% male and 49.6% female. The population was made up of 931 Swiss men (45.0% of the population) and 111 (5.4%) non-Swiss men. There were 936 Swiss women (45.3%) and 90 (4.4%) non-Swiss women. Of the population in the municipality, 389 or about 40.3% were born in Siviriez and lived there in 2000. There were 322 or 33.4% who were born in the same canton, while 108 or 11.2% were born somewhere else in Switzerland, and 102 or 10.6% were born outside of Switzerland.

As of 2000, children and teenagers (0–19 years old) make up 30.7% of the population, while adults (20–64 years old) make up 55.2% and seniors (over 64 years old) make up 14.1%.

As of 2000, there were 426 people who were single and never married in the municipality. There were 453 married individuals, 56 widows or widowers and 30 individuals who are divorced.

As of 2000, there were 634 private households in the municipality, and an average of 2.8 persons per household. There were 74 households that consist of only one person and 37 households with five or more people. In 2000, a total of 320 apartments (92.0% of the total) were permanently occupied, while 18 apartments (5.2%) were seasonally occupied and 10 apartments (2.9%) were empty. As of 2009, the construction rate of new housing units was 9.7 new units per 1000 residents. The vacancy rate for the municipality, in 2010, was 0.26%.

The historical population is given in the following chart:

== Sights ==
The entire village of Chavannes-les-Forts is designated as part of the Inventory of Swiss Heritage Sites.

== Politics ==
In the 2011 federal election the most popular party was the CVP which received 26.1% of the vote. The next three most popular parties were the SVP (25.0%), the SP (23.7%) and the FDP (10.4%).

The CVP received about the same percentage of the vote as they did in the 2007 Federal election (28.1% in 2007 vs 26.1% in 2011). The SVP retained about the same popularity (26.6% in 2007), the SPS retained about the same popularity (19.2% in 2007) and the FDP lost popularity (18.8% in 2007). A total of 647 votes were cast in this election, of which 6 or 0.9% were invalid.

== Economy ==
As of 2010, Siviriez had an unemployment rate of 2%. As of 2008, there were 203 people employed in the primary economic sector and about 73 businesses involved in this sector. 148 people were employed in the secondary sector and there were 29 businesses in this sector. 229 people were employed in the tertiary sector, with 44 businesses in this sector. There were 440 residents of the municipality who were employed in some capacity, of which females made up 39.3% of the workforce.

In 2008 the total number of full-time equivalent jobs was 448. The number of jobs in the primary sector was 144, of which 142 were in agriculture and 2 were in forestry or lumber production. The number of jobs in the secondary sector was 139 of which 59 or (42.4%) were in manufacturing and 79 (56.8%) were in construction. The number of jobs in the tertiary sector was 165. In the tertiary sector; 50 or 30.3% were in wholesale or retail sales or the repair of motor vehicles, 4 or 2.4% were in the movement and storage of goods, 11 or 6.7% were in a hotel or restaurant, 3 or 1.8% were the insurance or financial industry, 11 or 6.7% were technical professionals or scientists, 17 or 10.3% were in education and 60 or 36.4% were in health care.

In 2000, there were 129 workers who commuted into the municipality and 280 workers who commuted away. The municipality is a net exporter of workers, with about 2.2 workers leaving the municipality for every one entering. Of the working population, 6% used public transportation to get to work, and 64.1% used a private car.

== Religion ==
From the 2000 census, 827 or 85.7% were Roman Catholic, while 30 or 3.1% belonged to the Swiss Reformed Church. Of the rest of the population, 3 individuals (or about 0.31% of the population) were members of an Orthodox church, and 24 (or about 2.49% of the population) belonged to another Christian church. There were 16 (or about 1.66% of the population) who were Islamic. There was 1 individual who belonged to another church. 30 (or about 3.11% of the population) belonged to no church, were agnostic or atheist, and 46 individuals (or about 4.77% of the population) did not answer the question.

== Education ==
In Siviriez about 258 or (26.7%) of the population have completed non-mandatory upper secondary education, and 79 or (8.2%) have completed additional higher education (either university or a Fachhochschule). Of the 79 who completed tertiary schooling, 75.9% were Swiss men, 17.7% were Swiss women.

The Canton of Fribourg school system provides one year of non-obligatory Kindergarten, followed by six years of Primary school. This is followed by three years of obligatory lower Secondary school where the students are separated according to ability and aptitude. Following the lower Secondary students may attend a three or four year optional upper Secondary school. The upper Secondary school is divided into gymnasium (university preparatory) and vocational programs. After they finish the upper Secondary program, students may choose to attend a Tertiary school or continue their apprenticeship.

During the 2010–11 school year, there were a total of 221 students attending 15 classes in Siviriez. A total of 427 students from the municipality attended any school, either in the municipality or outside of it. There were 4 kindergarten classes with a total of 48 students in the municipality. The municipality had 10 primary classes and 165 students. During the same year, there was one lower secondary class with a total of 8 students. There were no upper Secondary classes or vocational classes, but there were 34 upper Secondary students and 84 upper Secondary vocational students who attended classes in another municipality. The municipality had no non-university Tertiary classes, but there were 6 non-university Tertiary students and 3 specialized Tertiary students who attended classes in another municipality.

As of 2000, there were 2 students in Siviriez who came from another municipality, while 67 residents attended schools outside the municipality.
