= Grangettes =

- Municipality
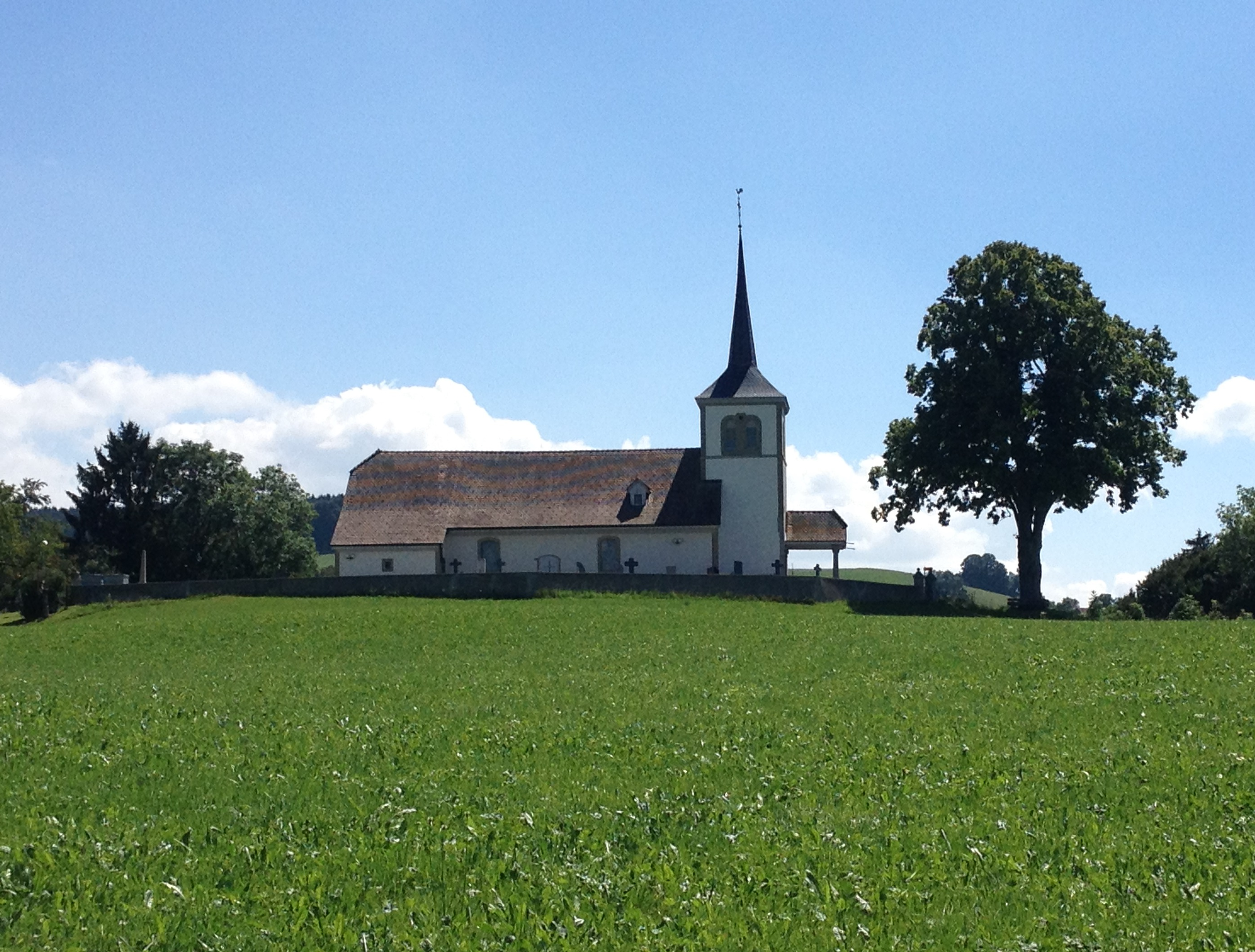

- Coat of arms
- Location of Grangettes
- Location within Switzerland Location within Canton of Fribourg
- Coordinates: 46°41′N 6°58′E
- Country: Switzerland
- Canton: Fribourg
- District: Glâne

Government
  - Mayor: Syndic

Area
  - Total: 3.3 km^{2} (1.3 sq mi)
- Elevation: 783 m (2,569 ft)

Population (December 2020)
  - Total: 218
  - Density: 66/km^{2} (170/sq mi)
- Time zone: UTC+01:00 (CET)
  - Summer (DST): UTC+02:00 (CEST)
- Postal code: 1686
- SFOS number: 2079
- ISO 3166 code: CH-FR
- Surrounded by: Le Châtelard, Marsens, Massonnens, Sâles, Vuisternens-devant-Romont
- Website: www.grangettes-pres-romont.ch

Grangettes (Arpitan: Grangètes [ɡʁɑ̃ˈdzətɛ]) is a municipality in the district of Glâne in the canton of Fribourg in Switzerland.

== History ==
Grangettes is first mentioned around 1147-54 as de Grangetes.

== Geography ==
Grangettes has an area, as of 2009, of 3.3 square kilometers (1.3 mi^{2}). Of this area, 2.31 km^{2} (0.89 mi^{2}) or 69.8% is used for agricultural purposes, while 0.88 km^{2} (0.34 mi^{2}) or 26.6% is forested. Of the rest of the land, 0.17 km^{2} (0.066 mi^{2}) or 5.1% is settled (buildings or roads).

Of the built up area, housing and buildings made up 2.7% and transportation infrastructure made up 1.5%. Out of the forested land, 24.2% of the total land area is heavily forested and 2.4% is covered with orchards or small clusters of trees. Of the agricultural land, 23.3% is used for growing crops and 37.8% is pastures and 8.5% is used for alpine pastures.

The municipality is located on the south-west flank of Mont Gibloux and on the right bank of the Neirigue.

== Coat of arms ==
The blazon of the municipal coat of arms is Azure, between two Mullets Argent on a Bend of the same three Barns Gules.

== Demographics ==
Grangettes has a population (as of December 2020) of 218. As of 2008, 6.8% of the population are resident foreign nationals. Over the last 10 years (2000–2010) the population has changed at a rate of -5.9%. Migration accounted for -1.8%, while births and deaths accounted for -1.2%.

Most of the population (as of 2000) speaks French (153 or 97.5%) as their first language, Spanish is the second most common (3 or 1.9%) and German is the third (1 or 0.6%).

As of 2008, the population was 49.7% male and 50.3% female. The population was made up of 70 Swiss men (44.6% of the population) and 8 (5.1%) non-Swiss men. There were 71 Swiss women (45.2%) and 8 (5.1%) non-Swiss women. Of the population in the municipality, 71 or about 45.2% were born in Grangettes and lived there in 2000. There were 59 or 37.6% who were born in the same canton, while 22 or 14.0% were born somewhere else in Switzerland, and 5 or 3.2% were born outside of Switzerland.

The age distribution, as of 2000, in Grangettes is; 20 children or 12.7% of the population are between 0 and 9 years old and 28 teenagers or 17.8% are between 10 and 19. Of the adult population, 14 people or 8.9% of the population are between 20 and 29 years old. 18 people or 11.5% are between 30 and 39, 35 people or 22.3% are between 40 and 49, and 13 people or 8.3% are between 50 and 59. The senior population distribution is 10 people or 6.4% of the population are between 60 and 69 years old, 12 people or 7.6% are between 70 and 79, and 7 people or 4.5% who are between 80 and 89.

As of 2000, there were 71 people who were single and never married in the municipality. There were 71 married individuals, 8 widows or widowers and 7 individuals who were divorced.

As of 2000, there were 55 private households in the municipality, and an average of 2.9 persons per household. There were 13 households that consist of only one person and 5 households with five or more people. In 2000, a total of 55 apartments (94.8% of the total) were permanently occupied and 3 apartments (5.2%) were empty. As of 2009, the construction rate of new housing units was 6.3 new units per 1,000 residents. The vacancy rate for the municipality, in 2010, was 4.35%.

The historical population is given in the following chart:

== Politics ==
In the 2011 federal election the most popular party was the SVP which received 39.9% of the vote. The next three most popular parties were the SP (23.2%), the FDP (14.3%) and the CVP (9.7%).

The SVP received about the same percentage of the vote as they did in the 2007 Federal election (42.4% in 2007 vs 39.9% in 2011). The SPS moved from fourth in 2007 (with 7.5%) to second in 2011, the FDP retained about the same popularity (15.6% in 2007) and the CVP moved from second in 2007 (with 26.5%) to fourth. A total of 56 votes were cast in this election.

== Economy ==
As of 2010, Grangettes had an unemployment rate of 2.8%. As of 2008, there were 25 people employed in the primary economic sector and about 11 businesses involved in this sector. 4 people were employed in the secondary sector and there were 2 businesses in this sector. 4 people were employed in the tertiary sector, with 2 businesses in this sector. There were 81 residents of the municipality who were employed in some capacity, of which females made up 46.9% of the workforce.

In 2008 the total number of full-time equivalent jobs was 26. The number of jobs in the primary sector was 18, all of which were in agriculture. The number of jobs in the secondary sector was 4, all of which were in manufacturing. The number of jobs in the tertiary sector was 4, of which 3 were in wholesale or retail sales or the repair of motor vehicles and 1 was in education.

In 2000, there were 4 workers who commuted into the municipality and 51 workers who commuted away. The municipality is a net exporter of workers, with about 12.8 workers leaving the municipality for every one entering. Of the working population, 7.4% used public transportation to get to work, and 58% used a private car.

== Religion ==
From the 2000 census, 139 or 88.5% were Roman Catholic, while 11 or 7.0% belonged to the Swiss Reformed Church. 5 (or about 3.18% of the population) belonged to no church, are agnostic or atheist, and 2 individuals (or about 1.27% of the population) did not answer the question.

== Education ==
In Grangettes about 48 or (30.6%) of the population have completed non-mandatory upper secondary education, and 11 or (7.0%) have completed additional higher education (either university or a Fachhochschule). Of the 11 who completed tertiary schooling, 81.8% were Swiss men, 18.2% were Swiss women.

The Canton of Fribourg school system provides one year of non-obligatory Kindergarten, followed by six years of Primary school. This is followed by three years of obligatory lower Secondary school where the students are separated according to ability and aptitude. Following the lower Secondary students may attend a three or four year optional upper Secondary school. The upper Secondary school is divided into gymnasium (university preparatory) and vocational programs. After they finish the upper Secondary program, students may choose to attend a Tertiary school or continue their apprenticeship.

During the 2010-11 school year, there were a total of 14 students attending one class in Grangettes. A total of 35 students from the municipality attended any school, either in the municipality or outside of it. There were no kindergarten classes in the municipality, but 3 students attended kindergarten in a neighboring municipality. The municipality had one primary class and 14 students. During the same year, there were no lower secondary classes in the municipality, but 9 students attended lower secondary school in a neighboring municipality. There were no upper Secondary classes or vocational classes, but there were 2 upper Secondary students and 4 upper Secondary vocational students who attended classes in another municipality. The municipality had no non-university Tertiary classes. who attended classes in another municipality.

As of 2000, there were 14 students in Grangettes who came from another municipality, while 27 residents attended schools outside the municipality.
