= Mézières, Fribourg =

Mézières
- Municipality
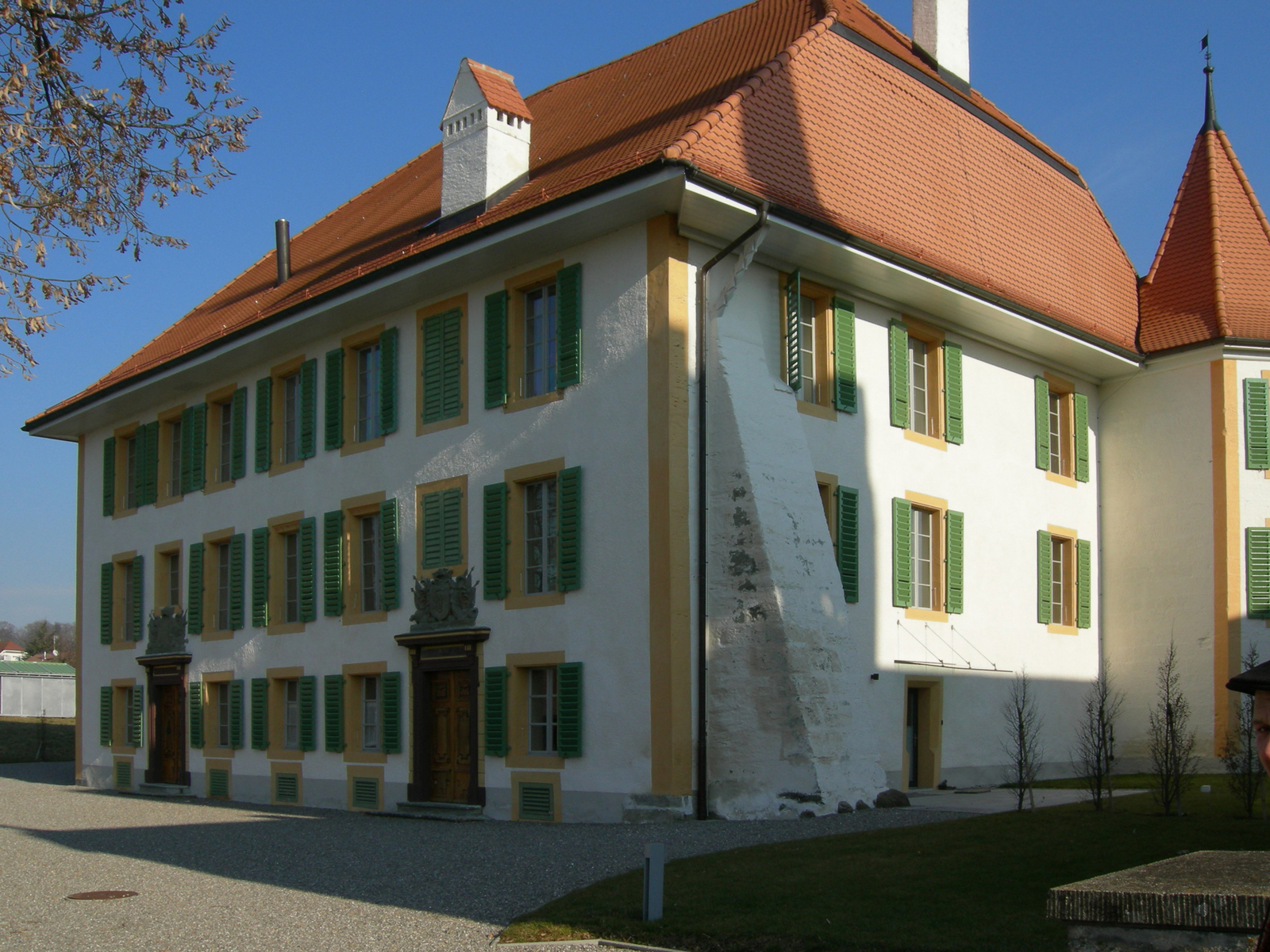
- Mézières castle

- Coat of arms
- Location of Mézières
- Location within Switzerland Location within Canton of Fribourg
- Coordinates: 46°41′N 6°56′E
- Country: Switzerland
- Canton: Fribourg
- District: Glâne

Government
  - Mayor: Syndic

Area
  - Total: 9.19 km^{2} (3.55 sq mi)
- Elevation: 760 m (2,490 ft)

Population (December 2020)
  - Total: 1,062
  - Density: 116/km^{2} (299/sq mi)
- Time zone: UTC+01:00 (CET)
  - Summer (DST): UTC+02:00 (CEST)
- Postal code: 1684
- SFOS number: 2087
- ISO 3166 code: CH-FR
- Surrounded by: Massonnens, Romont, Siviriez, Villaz-Saint-Pierre, Vuisternens-devant-Romont
- Website: https://www.mezieres-fr.ch SFSO statistics

Mézières (French pronunciation: [mezjɛʁ]; Arpitan: Mèsiéres, locally Méjîre [meˈʒiʁ(ə)]) is a municipality in the district of Glâne in the canton of Fribourg in Switzerland.

== History ==
Mézières is first mentioned in 1179 as de Maseriis.

On 1 January 2004 the former municipality of Berlens merged into the municipality of Mézières.

== Geography ==
Mézières has an area, as of 2009, of 8.9 square kilometers (3.4 mi^{2}). Of this area, 7.1 km^{2} (2.7 mi^{2}) or 79.5% is used for agricultural purposes, while 1.23 km^{2} (0.47 mi^{2}) or 13.8% is forested. Of the rest of the land, 0.61 km^{2} (0.24 mi^{2}) or 6.8% is settled (buildings or roads), 0.01 km^{2} (2.5 acres) or 0.1% is either rivers or lakes.

Of the built up area, housing and buildings made up 4.4% and transportation infrastructure made up 2.1%. Out of the forested land, 12.4% of the total land area is heavily forested and 1.3% is covered with orchards or small clusters of trees. Of the agricultural land, 41.7% is used for growing crops and 36.7% is pastures, while 1.1% is used for orchards or vine crops. All the water in the municipality is flowing water.

The municipality is located on the Romont-Bulle road.

== Coat of arms ==
The blazon of the municipal coat of arms is Per pale, Argent three bars gemmel Gules and Gules a Grape slipped Or.

== Demographics ==
Mézières has a population (as of December 2020) of 1,062. As of 2008, 7.9% of the population are resident foreign nationals. Over the last 10 years (2000–2010) the population has changed at a rate of 7.8%. Migration accounted for 8.3%, while births and deaths accounted for 0.5%.

Most of the population (as of 2000) speaks French (635 or 94.2%) as their first language, Portuguese is the second most common (16 or 2.4%) and German is the third (11 or 1.6%). There are 2 people who speak Italian.

As of 2008, the population was 50.4% male and 49.6% female. The population was made up of 452 Swiss men (46.1% of the population) and 42 (4.3%) non-Swiss men. There were 449 Swiss women (45.8%) and 37 (3.8%) non-Swiss women. Of the population in the municipality, 271 or about 40.2% were born in Mézières and lived there in 2000. There were 259 or 38.4% who were born in the same canton, while 85 or 12.6% were born somewhere else in Switzerland, and 46 or 6.8% were born outside of Switzerland.

The age distribution, as of 2000, in Mézières is; 153 children or 16.8% of the population are between 0 and 9 years old and 127 teenagers or 13.9% are between 10 and 19. Of the adult population, 108 people or 11.9% of the population are between 20 and 29 years old. 138 people or 15.1% are between 30 and 39, 133 people or 14.6% are between 40 and 49, and 96 people or 10.5% are between 50 and 59. The senior population distribution is 78 people or 8.6% of the population are between 60 and 69 years old, 44 people or 4.8% are between 70 and 79, there are 32 people or 3.5% who are between 80 and 89, and there are 2 people or 0.2% who are 90 and older.

As of 2000, there were 294 people who were single and never married in the municipality. There were 337 married individuals, 26 widows or widowers and 17 individuals who are divorced.

As of 2000, there were 309 private households in the municipality, and an average of 2.9 persons per household. There were 44 households that consist of only one person and 30 households with five or more people. In 2000, a total of 231 apartments (96.7% of the total) were permanently occupied, while 2 apartments (0.8%) were seasonally occupied and 6 apartments (2.5%) were empty. As of 2009, the construction rate of new housing units was 7 new units per 1000 residents. The vacancy rate for the municipality, in 2010, was 1.11%.

The historical population is given in the following chart:

== Heritage sites of national significance ==
The Castle and Saint-Pierre-au-Liens Church are listed as Swiss heritage site of national significance. The entire village of Mézières is part of the Inventory of Swiss Heritage Sites.

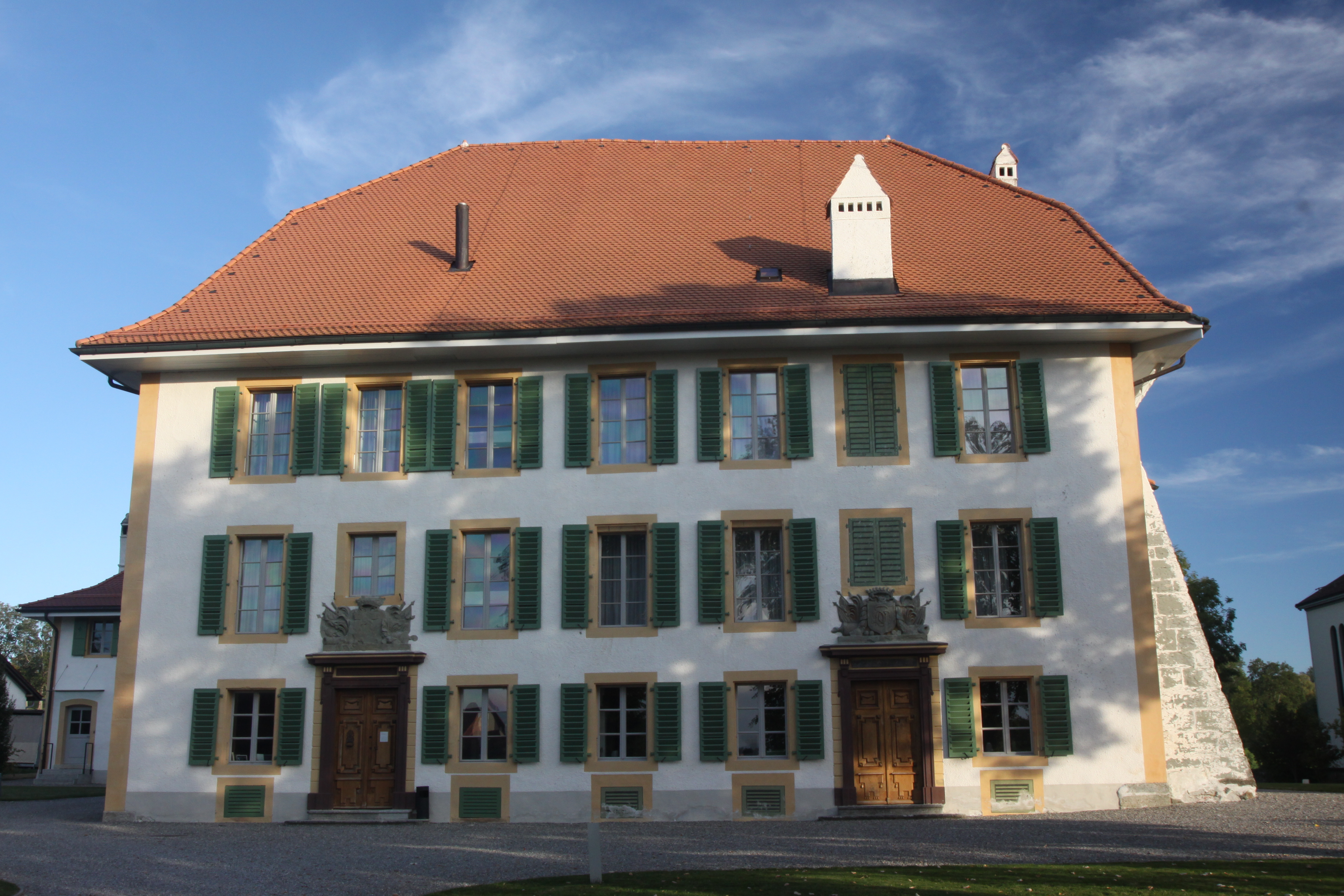
Mézières Castle

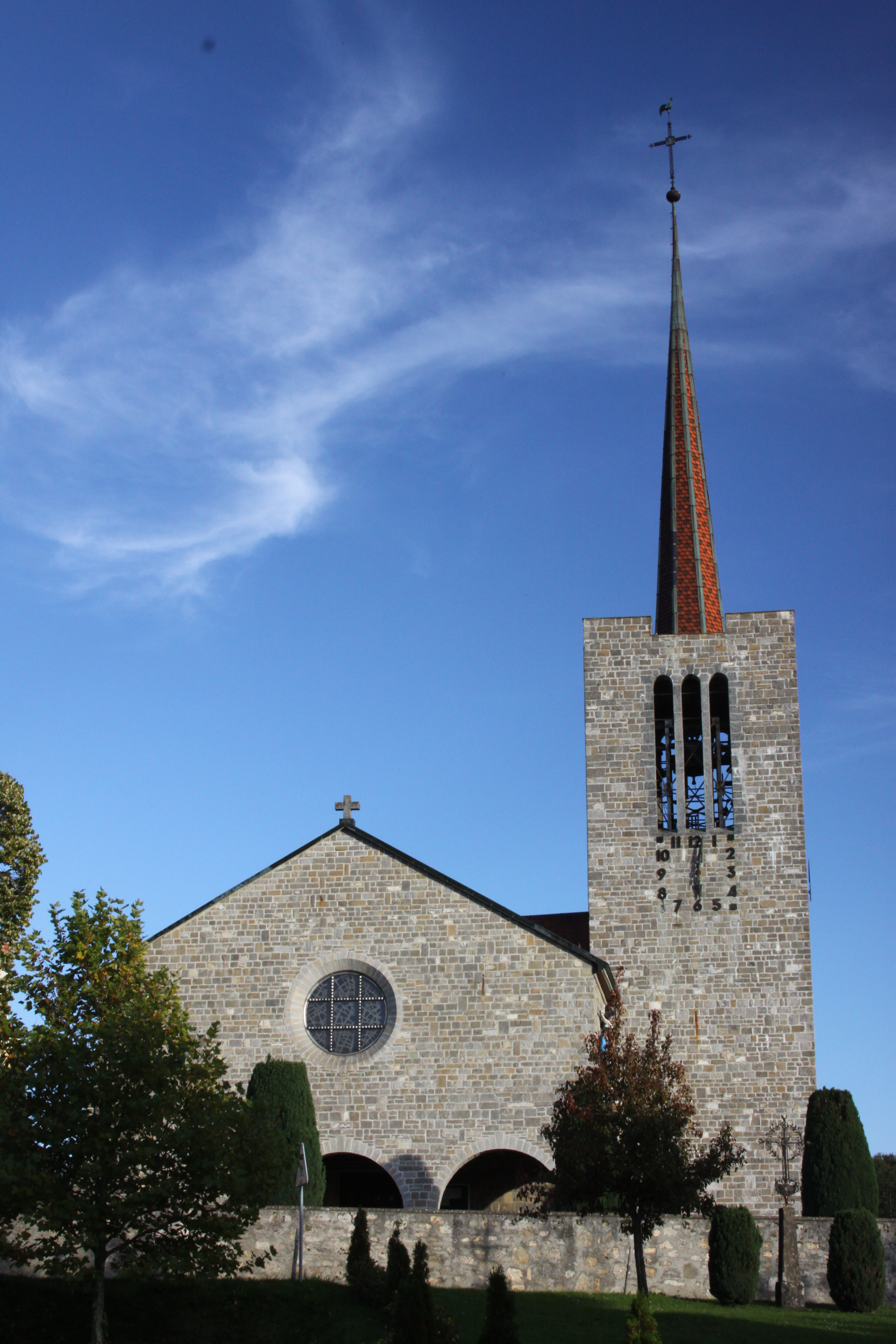
Saint-Pierre-au-Liens Church

== Politics ==
In the 2011 federal election the most popular party was the SVP which received 30.7% of the vote. The next three most popular parties were the SP (21.5%), the CVP (21.0%) and the FDP (11.3%).

The SVP received about the same percentage of the vote as they did in the 2007 Federal election (27.9% in 2007 vs 30.7% in 2011). The SPS moved from third in 2007 (with 21.7%) to second in 2011, the CVP moved from second in 2007 (with 25.4%) to third and the FDP retained about the same popularity (15.6% in 2007). A total of 335 votes were cast in this election, of which 1 or 0.3% was invalid.

== Economy ==
As of 2010, Mézières had an unemployment rate of 2.5%. As of 2008, there were 84 people employed in the primary economic sector and about 32 businesses involved in this sector. 41 people were employed in the secondary sector and there were 8 businesses in this sector. 72 people were employed in the tertiary sector, with 17 businesses in this sector. There were 309 residents of the municipality who were employed in some capacity, of which females made up 43.0% of the workforce.

In 2008 the total number of full-time equivalent jobs was 161. The number of jobs in the primary sector was 60, all of which were in agriculture. The number of jobs in the secondary sector was 39 of which 11 or (28.2%) were in manufacturing and 28 (71.8%) were in construction. The number of jobs in the tertiary sector was 62. In the tertiary sector; 36 or 58.1% were in wholesale or retail sales or the repair of motor vehicles, 2 or 3.2% were in the movement and storage of goods, 8 or 12.9% were in a hotel or restaurant, 3 or 4.8% were the insurance or financial industry, 3 or 4.8% were technical professionals or scientists, 6 or 9.7% were in education.

In 2000, there were 42 workers who commuted into the municipality and 219 workers who commuted away. The municipality is a net exporter of workers, with about 5.2 workers leaving the municipality for every one entering. Of the working population, 7.1% used public transportation to get to work, and 68.5% used a private car.

== Religion ==
From the 2000 census, 600 or 89.0% were Roman Catholic, while 28 or 4.2% belonged to the Swiss Reformed Church. Of the rest of the population, there was 1 member of an Orthodox church, and there were 14 individuals (or about 2.08% of the population) who belonged to another Christian church. There were 8 (or about 1.19% of the population) who were Islamic. 22 (or about 3.26% of the population) belonged to no church, are agnostic or atheist, and 8 individuals (or about 1.19% of the population) did not answer the question.

== Education ==
In Mézières about 202 or (30.0%) of the population have completed non-mandatory upper secondary education, and 40 or (5.9%) have completed additional higher education (either university or a Fachhochschule). Of the 40 who completed tertiary schooling, 67.5% were Swiss men, 25.0% were Swiss women.

The Canton of Fribourg school system provides one year of non-obligatory Kindergarten, followed by six years of Primary school. This is followed by three years of obligatory lower Secondary school where the students are separated according to ability and aptitude. Following the lower Secondary students may attend a three or four year optional upper Secondary school. The upper Secondary school is divided into gymnasium (university preparatory) and vocational programs. After they finish the upper Secondary program, students may choose to attend a Tertiary school or continue their apprenticeship.

During the 2010-11 school year, there were a total of 98 students attending 5 classes in Mézières. A total of 229 students from the municipality attended any school, either in the municipality or outside of it. There was one kindergarten class with a total of 21 students in the municipality. The municipality had 4 primary classes and 77 students. During the same year, there were no lower secondary classes in the municipality, but 56 students attended lower secondary school in a neighboring municipality. There were no upper Secondary classes or vocational classes, but there were 22 upper Secondary students and 45 upper Secondary vocational students who attended classes in another municipality. The municipality had no non-university Tertiary classes, but there were 3 non-university Tertiary students and 5 specialized Tertiary students who attended classes in another municipality.

As of 2000, there was one student in Mézières who came from another municipality, while 52 residents attended schools outside the municipality.
