= Berlens =

Village and former municipality in the canton of Fribourg, Switzerland

Coordinates: 46°41′38″N 6°57′13″E

Berlens (French: [bɛʁlɑ̃s]; Arpitan: Bèrlens [bɛʁˈlɛ̃]) is a village and former municipality in the district of Glâne in the canton of Fribourg, Switzerland.

It was first recorded in 1157 as Berlens, but has also been known as Berlingen (in German).

The municipality had 96 inhabitants in 1811, which increased to 131 in 1850 and 205 in 1880. It then went up and down to 171 in 1900, 178 in 1950 and 125 in 1980. It finally rose to 237 in 2000.

In 2004 the municipality was incorporated into the larger, neighboring municipality Mézières.
