= Glâne District =

Coordinates: 46°40′N 6°55′E

- District
- Coat of arms
- Country: Switzerland
- Canton: Fribourg
- Capital: Romont

Area
  - Total: 168.8 km^{2} (65.2 sq mi)

Population (31 December 2020)
  - Total: 24,957
  - Density: 147.8/km^{2} (382.9/sq mi)
- Time zone: UTC+1 (CET)
  - Summer (DST): UTC+2 (CEST)
- Municipalities: 14
- Website: Glâne

Glâne District (German: Glânebezirk; French: District de la Glâne; Arpitan: District de la Gllânna [diʃˈtʁi də la ˈjɑ̃na]) is one of seven districts in the Canton of Fribourg in Switzerland. It has a population of 24,957 (as of 31 December 2020).

== Municipalities ==
It consists of the following municipalities:

Coat of Arms	Municipality	Population (31 December 2020)	Area in km^{2}
	Billens-Hennens	791	4.89
	Châtonnaye	858	6.36
	Grangettes	218	3.36
	Le Châtelard	349	7.48
	Massonnens	548	4.24
	Mézières	1,062	9.19
	Romont	5,417	10.90
	Rue	1,537	20.04
	Siviriez	2,346	20.27
	Torny	988	10.20
	Ursy	3,299	17.13
	Villaz	2,310	15.44
	Villorsonnens	1,483	15.50
	Vuisternens-devant-Romont	2,338	24.09
	Total	24,957	168.8

== Mergers and name changes ==
- On 1 March 1969 the municipality of Ecublens (FR) along with the former municipality of Eschiens and Villangeaux merged into the municipality of Ecublens (FR).
- On 1 January 1973 the municipality of Villarimboud and Macconnens merged into the municipality of Villarimboud.
- On 1 January 1978 the former municipalities of Villaranon and Le Saulgy merged into Siviriez.
- On 1 January 1978 the former municipality of Fuyens merged into Villaz-Saint-Pierre.
- On 1 January 1981 the municipality of Romont (FR) and Les Glânes merged into the municipality of Romont (FR).
- On 1 January 1991 the municipality of Vuarmarens and Morlens merged into the municipality of Vuarmarens.
- On 1 January 1993 the former municipality of Blessens merged into Rue.
- On 1 January 1998 the former municipalities of Billens and Hennens merged to form the new municipality of Billens-Hennens.
- On 1 January 2001 the former municipalities of Villarsiviriaux, Villargiroud, Chavannes-sous-Orsonnens and Orsonnens merged to form the new municipality of Villorsonnens. The former municipalities of Vauderens, Bionnens and Mossel merged into Ursy. The former municipalities of Gillarens and Promasens merged into Rue.
- On 1 January 2003 the municipality of Vuisternens-devant-Romont along with the former municipalities of Sommentier, Villariaz, Estévenens, La Joux (FR), La Magne, Les Ecasseys and Lieffrens merged into the municipality of Vuisternens-devant-Romont.
- On 1 January 2004 the former municipalities of Torny-le-Grand and Middes merged to form the new municipality of Torny. The former municipality of Berlens merged into Mézières (FR). The former municipalities of Villaraboud, Chavannes-les-Forts and Prez-vers-Siviriez merged into Siviriez. The former municipality of La Neirigue merged into Vuisternens-devant-Romont.
- On 1 January 2005 the former municipalities of Lussy (FR) and Villarimboud merged to form the new municipality of La Folliaz.
- On 1 January 2006 the former municipality of Esmonts merged into Vuarmarens.
- On 1 January 2012 the former municipality of Vuarmarens merged into the municipality of Ursy.
- On 1 January 2020 the former municipalities of La Folliaz and Villaz-Saint-Pierre merged to form the new municipality of Villaz.
- On 1 January 2025 the former municipalities Auboranges, Chapelle and Écublens merged into the municipality of Rue.
- On 1 January 2025 the former municipality of Montet merged into the municipality of Ursy.

== Coat of arms ==
The blazon of the district coat of arms is Gules, a Castle Argent with dexter Tower higher than the sinister one.

== Demographics ==
Glâne has a population (as of December 2020) of 24,957. Most of the population (as of 2000) speaks French (16,347 or 92.0%) as their first language, German is the second most common (436 or 2.5%) and Portuguese is the third (421 or 2.4%). There are 66 people who speak Italian and 2 people who speak Romansh.

As of 2008, the population was 50.1% male and 49.9% female. The population was made up of 8,640 Swiss men (42.5% of the population) and 1,542 (7.6%) non-Swiss men. There were 8,739 Swiss women (43.0%) and 1,421 (7.0%) non-Swiss women.

Of the population in the district, 6,481 or about 36.5% were born in Glâne and lived there in 2000. There were 5,869 or 33.0% who were born in the same canton, while 2,830 or 15.9% were born somewhere else in Switzerland, and 2,105 or 11.8% were born outside of Switzerland.

The age distribution, as of 2000, in Glâne is; 2,536 children or 14.3% of the population are between 0 and 9 years old and 2,535 teenagers or 14.3% are between 10 and 19. Of the adult population, 2,150 people or 12.1% of the population are between 20 and 29 years old. 2,874 people or 16.2% are between 30 and 39, 2,605 people or 14.7% are between 40 and 49, and 1,965 people or 11.1% are between 50 and 59. The senior population distribution is 1,346 people or 7.6% of the population are between 60 and 69 years old, 1,101 people or 6.2% are between 70 and 79, there are 574 people or 3.2% who are between 80 and 89, and there are 88 people or 0.5% who are 90 and older.

As of 2000, there were 7,928 people who were single and never married in the district. There were 8,260 married individuals, 957 widows or widowers and 629 individuals who are divorced.

There were 1,719 households that consist of only one person and 776 households with five or more people.

The historical population is given in the following chart:

== Politics ==
In the 2011 federal election the most popular party was the SVP which received 26.6% of the vote. The next three most popular parties were the CVP (24.3%), the SP (22.3%) and the FDP (10.9%).

The SVP received about the same percentage of the vote as they did in the 2007 Federal election (27.3% in 2007 vs 26.6% in 2011). The CVP retained about the same popularity (26.3% in 2007), the SPS retained about the same popularity (20.2% in 2007) and the FDP retained about the same popularity (15.8% in 2007). A total of 6,412 votes were cast in this election, of which 77 or 1.2% were invalid.

== Religion ==
From the 2000 census, 14,027 or 78.9% were Roman Catholic, while 1,356 or 7.6% belonged to the Swiss Reformed Church. Of the rest of the population, there were 149 members of an Orthodox church (or about 0.84% of the population), there were 8 individuals (or about 0.05% of the population) who belonged to the Christian Catholic Church, and there were 368 individuals (or about 2.07% of the population) who belonged to another Christian church. There were 4 individuals (or about 0.02% of the population) who were Jewish, and 405 (or about 2.28% of the population) who were Islamic. There were 10 individuals who were Buddhist and 9 individuals who belonged to another church. 1,016 (or about 5.72% of the population) belonged to no church, are agnostic or atheist, and 587 individuals (or about 3.30% of the population) did not answer the question.

== Education ==
In Glâne about 5,311 or (29.9%) of the population have completed non-mandatory upper secondary education, and 1,485 or (8.4%) have completed additional higher education (either university or a Fachhochschule). Of the 1,485 who completed tertiary schooling, 66.3% were Swiss men, 24.9% were Swiss women, 4.2% were non-Swiss men and 4.5% were non-Swiss women.

The Canton of Fribourg school system provides one year of non-obligatory Kindergarten, followed by six years of Primary school. This is followed by three years of obligatory lower Secondary school where the students are separated according to ability and aptitude. Following the lower Secondary students may attend a three or four year optional upper Secondary school. The upper Secondary school is divided into gymnasium (university preparatory) and vocational programs. After they finish the upper Secondary program, students may choose to attend a Tertiary school or continue their apprenticeship.

During the 2010–11 school year, there were a total of 3,139 students attending 173 classes in Glâne. A total of 4,046 students from the district attended any school, either in the district or outside of it. There were 25 kindergarten classes with a total of 454 students in the district. The district had 84 primary classes and 1,577 students. During the same year, there were 43 lower secondary classes with a total of 925 students. There were 3 upper Secondary classes, with 66 upper Secondary students. The district had 18 special Tertiary classes, with 117 specialized Tertiary students.
