= Glâne (river) =

River in Switzerland

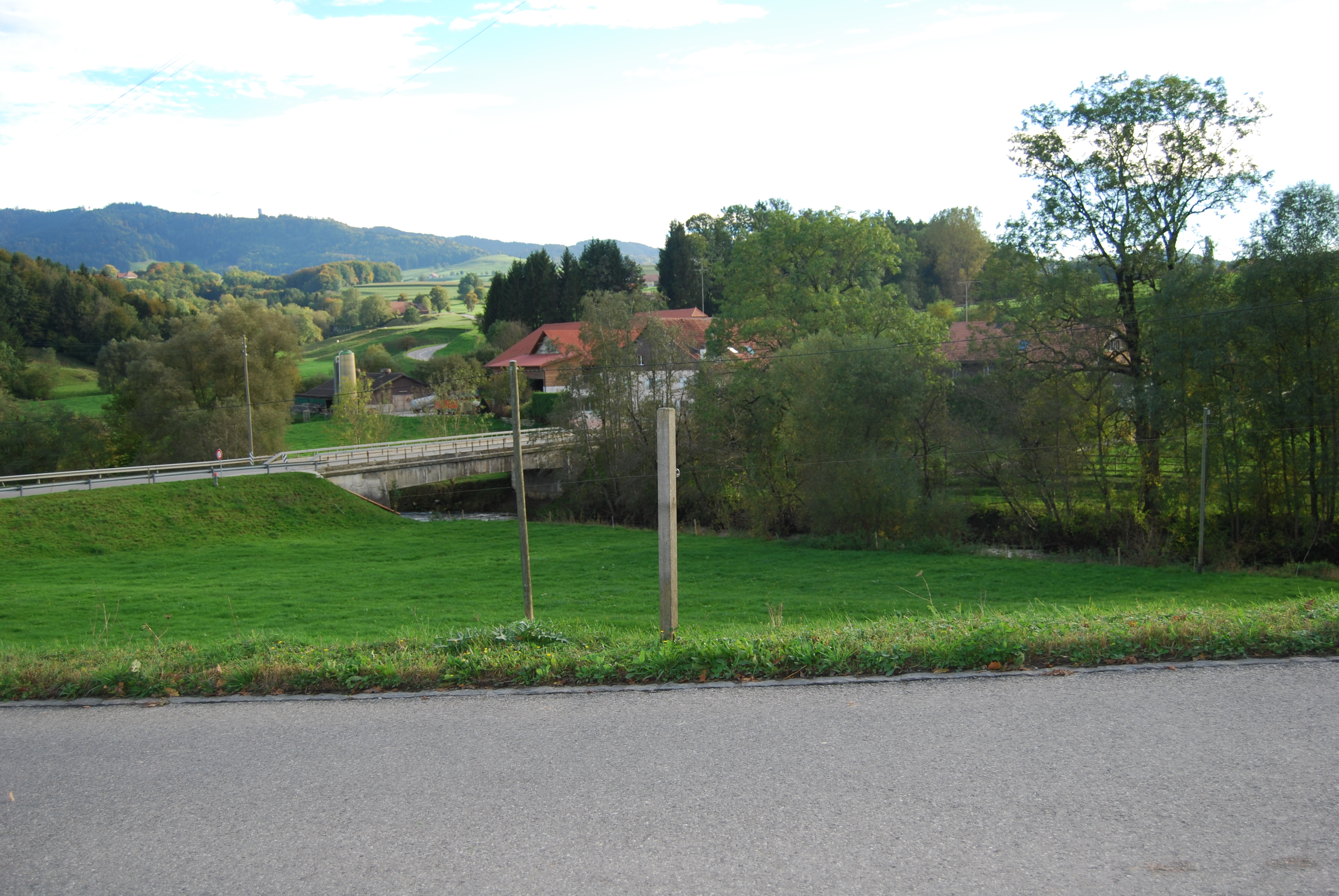
- Bridge over the Glâne at Moulin, municipality Autigny, canton of Fribourg, Switzerland

Location
- Country: Switzerland

Physical characteristics
- Source
  - location: Rio de l'enfer
  - coordinates: 46°37′09″N 6°53′04″E
  - elevation: 840 m (2,760 ft)
- Mouth
  - location: Sarine
  - coordinates: 46°47′09″N 7°07′47″E
  - elevation: 560 m (1,840 ft)
- Length: 36.9 km (22.9 mi)
- Basin size: 193 km^{2} (75 sq mi)

Basin features
- Progression: Sarine→ Aare→ Rhine→ North Sea

Glâne (French: [ɡlɑn]; Arpitan: (la) Gllânna [la ˈjɑ̃na]) is a river in Switzerland that crosses part of the Canton of Fribourg. It is a tributary of the Sarine and a sub-tributary of the Rhine river. The Neirigue and the Glèbe are its two largest tributaries.

The river gave its name to the surrounding Glâne district of the canton.

The Glâne has its source in the town of Siviriez, then heads northeast becoming the border between the municipalities of Mézières, Romont, Villaz-Saint-Pierre, Villorsonnens and La Folliaz. It then continues east and northeast through the Sarine district where it borders the municipalities of Chénens, Autigny, Farvagny, Cottens, Neyruz and Matran, finally joining the Sarine River on the border between Villars-sur-Glâne and Hauterive.

The river has powered several mills and sawmills throughout history. In addition, during the nineteenth century public baths were built north of Romont.

== See also ==
- List of rivers of Switzerland
