= Bailiwick of Romont =

Former Fribourg bailiwick and district

Bailiwick of Romont Bailliage de Romont
- Bailiwick of Fribourg
- 1536–1798
- Territory of the bailiwick
- Capital: Romont
- History
  - Established: 1536
  - Disestablished: 1798

The Bailiwick of Romont (French: bailliage de Romont) was a bailiwick of the canton of Fribourg from 1536 to 1798, whose bailiff resided in Romont Castle. It was formed in 1536, when Fribourg turned the Savoyard castellany of Romont (1240–1536) into a bailiwick. The castellany, about 130 square kilometers (50 sq mi) in area, comprised roughly the territory of the present-day Glâne district; in 1439 it was raised to the County of Romont. From 1798 to 1848 Romont was a district, and in 1848 it was combined with the district of Rue to form the Glâne district.

== History ==
=== Savoyard castellany and county ===
The castellany of Romont covered about 130 square kilometers and comprised roughly the territory of the present-day Glâne district, without the Basse-Glâne (Lower Glâne), which was under the jurisdiction of the castellan of Rue. Peter II of Savoy founded the new town of Romont in the valley of the Glâne to provide an alternative to the corridors of the Broye and the Sarine on the route linking Lake Geneva with Fribourg. The expansionist aims of the House of Savoy toward the northeast made the region a bridgehead against its Habsburg, Bernese and Fribourg rivals. From 1285 to 1359 the castellany was part of the appanage of the lords of Savoy-Vaud; in 1359 Catherine, Lady of Vaud, sold the Pays de Vaud to Count Amadeus VI of Savoy.

In his will of 1439, Duke Amadeus VIII raised the castle, the town, the castellany, the mandement (district) and the jurisdiction of Romont to a county in favor of his half-brother Humbert the Bastard. In 1460 Duke Louis transferred the county and the title of count to his son Jacques. At the end of the Burgundian Wars, Jacques of Romont, who had sided with Charles the Bold, lost his appanage, which Duchess Yolande of Savoy bought back from Bern in 1478. Jacques's daughter, Françoise Louise (c. 1485–1511), asserted her rights on her father's death in 1486, and an arbitral award by Margaret of Austria granted her compensation of 30,000 florins. Although Emmanuel Philibert formally renounced the county in favor of Fribourg in 1578, the dukes of Savoy, and later the kings of Sardinia and of Italy, kept the title of Count of Romont among their titles until 1946.

The castellan, a revocable and salaried officer, was responsible for high justice, the defense of the town, the representation of Romont in the Estates of Vaud, taxation, and the accounts, which he presented every year to the Chamber of Accounts. On taking office he swore to the community of the inhabitants of Romont to respect its franchises, which were copied from those of Moudon. The castellany remained Savoyard until the conquest of the Pays de Vaud by Bern and Fribourg in 1536. It then placed itself in the hands of Catholic Fribourg in order to keep its faith.

The population of the castellany exceeded 4,000 before the great mortality of the second half of the 14th century. Apart from the town of Romont, which grew strongly between its foundation (about 1,150 inhabitants according to the extents of 1278) and the middle of the 14th century (at least 1,650 inhabitants according to the land registers of 1364 and 1404), the twenty or so neighboring villages had no more than 500 hearths. The modest local nobility, such as the Billens, Dompierre and Illens families, paid homage to the count (later the duke) of Savoy and supported him in the region. Men liable to the taille were numerous until the end of the 15th century. The effect of mercenary service and emigration on the population remains unknown.

The main resources were livestock farming, agriculture (Romont is said to have been a regional center of the oat trade from the 13th century) and forestry. The agricultural and technical development of the region owed much to the Cistercians of Hauterive: mills, threshing mills and fulling mills were numerous along the Glaney, the Glâne and the Neirigue, without leading to the development of a real industry. In the 16th century the castellany fell back on a rural economy and local crafts.

=== Fribourg bailiwick and district ===
In 1536 Fribourg turned the castellany into a bailiwick. The bailiff, always a Fribourg patrician, resided in Romont Castle. In 1798 the bailiwick was one of those that wanted the creation of a canton of Sarine and Broye. From 1798 to 1848 the district of Romont was administered by a prefect. During the Helvetic Republic (1798–1803), the bailiwick of Romont, enlarged by that of Farvagny, formed the district of Romont, which had just under 7,000 inhabitants in 1798. The district was receptive to the Bourla-papey movement and supported the abolition of feudal rights. During the federalist insurrection in the autumn of 1802, the district was politically divided: Farvagny favored the federalists, while the south of the district and the town of Romont remained loyal to the Helvetic Republic.

During the Restoration, the district tried to oppose the restoration of the patriciate. The Regeneration (1830–1845) brought the Fribourg patriciate closer to the local notables, such as the Moret, Badoud, Wuilleret and Musy families. The savings bank of Romont (Caisse d'épargne) was founded in 1830, when it was decided to modernize the roads, in particular the road linking Romont with Fribourg and Rue. The economy, however, remained based on agriculture and livestock farming. Fribourg's defeat in the Sonderbund War in 1847 led to a reorganization of the administrative divisions and, in 1848, to the creation of the Glâne district, which combined the districts of Romont and Rue.

== Bibliography ==
- M.-J. de Savoie, La maison de Savoie, 3 vols., 1956–1962
- Histoire du canton de Fribourg, 2 vols., 1981
- A. Paravicini Bagliani (ed.), Les pays romands au Moyen Age, 1997
- B. Andenmatten, La maison de Savoie et la noblesse vaudoise (XIIIe–XIVe s.), 2005
