= Vuisternens-devant-Romont =

- Municipality
- Flag Coat of arms
- Location of Vuisternens-devant-Romont
- Location within Switzerland Location within Canton of Fribourg
- Coordinates: 46°39′N 6°56′E
- Country: Switzerland
- Canton: Fribourg
- District: Glâne

Government
  - Mayor: Syndic

Area
  - Total: 24.09 km^{2} (9.30 sq mi)
- Elevation: 791 m (2,595 ft)

Population (December 2020)
  - Total: 2,338
  - Density: 97.05/km^{2} (251.4/sq mi)
- Time zone: UTC+01:00 (CET)
  - Summer (DST): UTC+02:00 (CEST)
- Postal code: 1687
- SFOS number: 2113
- ISO 3166 code: CH-FR
- Surrounded by: Grangettes, La Verrerie, Le Flon, Massonnens, Mézières, Sâles, Siviriez
- Website: https://www.vuisternens-devant-romont.ch SFSO statistics

Vuisternens-devant-Romont (French pronunciation: [vistɛʁnɑ̃s dəvɑ̃ ʁɔmɔ̃]; Arpitan: Vouéthèrnens-devant-Remont, locally Vouèthèrnin-dèvan-Remon [vɛθɛʁˈnɛ̃ deˈvɛ̃ ʁəˈmɔ̃]) is a municipality in the district of Glâne in the canton of Fribourg in Switzerland.

== Geography ==
Aerial view (1964)

Vuisternens-devant-Romont has an area, as of 2009, of 24.1 square kilometers (9.3 mi^{2}). Of this area, 18.88 km^{2} (7.29 mi^{2}) or 78.5% is used for agricultural purposes, while 3.63 km^{2} (1.40 mi^{2}) or 15.1% is forested. Of the rest of the land, 1.47 km^{2} (0.57 mi^{2}) or 6.1% is settled (buildings or roads), 0.05 km^{2} (12 acres) or 0.2% is either rivers or lakes and 0.06 km^{2} (15 acres) or 0.2% is unproductive land.

Of the built up area, housing and buildings made up 3.3% and transportation infrastructure made up 2.3%. Out of the forested land, 12.8% of the total land area is heavily forested and 2.2% is covered with orchards or small clusters of trees. Of the agricultural land, 28.3% is used for growing crops and 49.6% is pastures. All the water in the municipality is flowing water.

== Coat of arms ==
The blazon of the former municipal coat of arms is Argent, a Bend Gules.

== Demographics ==
Vuisternens-devant-Romont has a population (as of December 2020) of 2,338. As of 2008, 4.3% of the population are resident foreign nationals. Over the last 10 years (2000–2010) the population has changed at a rate of 8.2%. Migration accounted for 2.4%, while births and deaths accounted for 4.6%.

Most of the population (as of 2000) speaks French (507 or 94.4%) as their first language, Portuguese is the second most common (15 or 2.8%) and German is the third (11 or 2.0%).

As of 2008, the population was 49.3% male and 50.7% female. The population was made up of 913 Swiss men (46.8% of the population) and 49 (2.5%) non-Swiss men. There were 934 Swiss women (47.8%) and 56 (2.9%) non-Swiss women. Of the population in the municipality, 176 or about 32.8% were born in Vuisternens-devant-Romont and lived there in 2000. There were 225 or 41.9% who were born in the same canton, while 70 or 13.0% were born somewhere else in Switzerland, and 48 or 8.9% were born outside of Switzerland.

As of 2000, children and teenagers (0–19 years old) make up 29.8% of the population, while adults (20–64 years old) make up 56.3% and seniors (over 64 years old) make up 13.9%.

As of 2000, there were 253 people who were single and never married in the municipality. There were 241 married individuals, 32 widows or widowers and 11 individuals who are divorced.

As of 2000, there were 614 private households in the municipality, and an average of 2.9 persons per household. There were 49 households that consist of only one person and 18 households with five or more people. In 2000, a total of 185 apartments (86.4% of the total) were permanently occupied, while 21 apartments (9.8%) were seasonally occupied and 8 apartments (3.7%) were empty. As of 2009, the construction rate of new housing units was 6.7 new units per 1000 residents.

The historical population is given in the following chart:

== Heritage sites of national significance ==
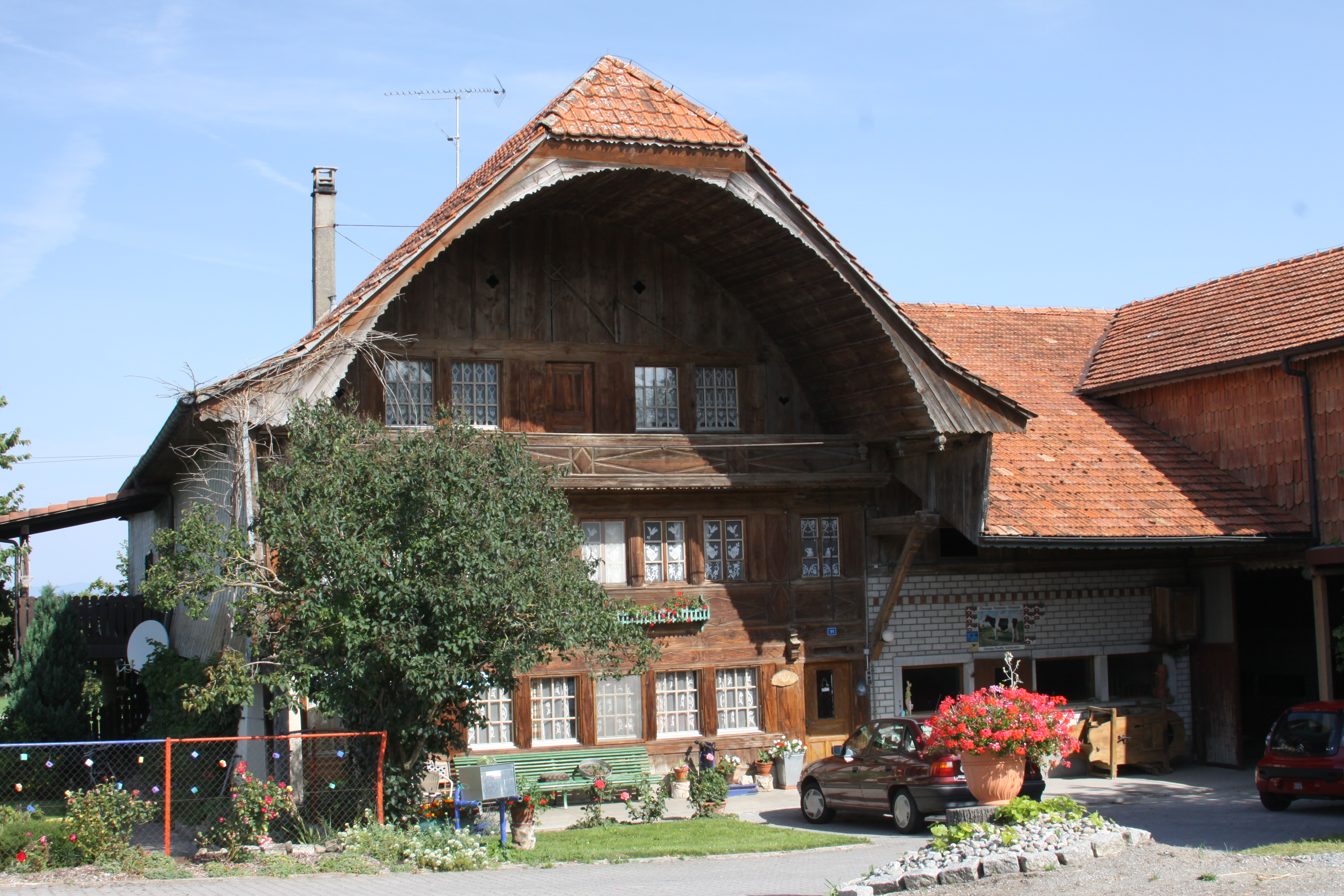
Farm House

The Farm House at Route De Villariaz 11 is listed as a Swiss heritage site of national significance.

== Politics ==
In the 2011 federal election the most popular party was the SVP which received 34.9% of the vote. The next three most popular parties were the CVP (23.5%), the SP (16.1%) and the FDP (12.8%).

The SVP gained an additional 5.1% of the vote from the 2007 Federal election (29.8% in 2007 vs 34.9% in 2011). The CVP retained about the same popularity (28.4% in 2007), the SPS retained about the same popularity (16.5% in 2007) and the FDP retained about the same popularity (15.5% in 2007). A total of 637 votes were cast in this election, of which 4 or 0.6% were invalid.

== Economy ==
As of 2010, Vuisternens-devant-Romont had an unemployment rate of 1.5%. As of 2008, there were 218 people employed in the primary economic sector and about 95 businesses involved in this sector. 122 people were employed in the secondary sector and there were 25 businesses in this sector. 187 people were employed in the tertiary sector, with 30 businesses in this sector. There were 277 residents of the municipality who were employed in some capacity, of which females made up 44.8% of the workforce.

In 2008 the total number of full-time equivalent jobs was 411. The number of jobs in the primary sector was 165, all of which were in agriculture. The number of jobs in the secondary sector was 109 of which 59 or (54.1%) were in manufacturing and 51 (46.8%) were in construction. The number of jobs in the tertiary sector was 137. In the tertiary sector; 13 or 9.5% were in wholesale or retail sales or the repair of motor vehicles, 36 or 26.3% were in the movement and storage of goods, 13 or 9.5% were in a hotel or restaurant, 4 or 2.9% were the insurance or financial industry, 3 or 2.2% were technical professionals or scientists, 13 or 9.5% were in education and 41 or 29.9% were in health care.

In 2000, there were 54 workers who commuted into the municipality and 201 workers who commuted away. The municipality is a net exporter of workers, with about 3.7 workers leaving the municipality for every one entering. Of the working population, 5.8% used public transportation to get to work, and 64.5% used a private car.

== Religion ==
From the 2000 census, 480 or 89.4% were Roman Catholic, while 8 or 1.5% belonged to the Swiss Reformed Church. Of the rest of the population, there were 20 individuals (or about 3.72% of the population) who belonged to another Christian church. There were 4 (or about 0.74% of the population) who were Islamic. 16 (or about 2.98% of the population) belonged to no church, are agnostic or atheist, and 19 individuals (or about 3.54% of the population) did not answer the question.

== Education ==
In Vuisternens-devant-Romont about 164 or (30.5%) of the population have completed non-mandatory upper secondary education, and 39 or (7.3%) have completed additional higher education (either university or a Fachhochschule). Of the 39 who completed tertiary schooling, 48.7% were Swiss men, 28.2% were Swiss women, 12.8% were non-Swiss men.

The Canton of Fribourg school system provides one year of non-obligatory Kindergarten, followed by six years of Primary school. This is followed by three years of obligatory lower Secondary school where the students are separated according to ability and aptitude. Following the lower Secondary students may attend a three or four year optional upper Secondary school. The upper Secondary school is divided into gymnasium (university preparatory) and vocational programs. After they finish the upper Secondary program, students may choose to attend a Tertiary school or continue their apprenticeship.

During the 2010-11 school year, there were a total of 204 students attending 11 classes in Vuisternens-devant-Romont. A total of 401 students from the municipality attended any school, either in the municipality or outside of it. There were 2 kindergarten classes with a total of 25 students in the municipality. The municipality had 9 primary classes and 179 students. During the same year, there were no lower secondary classes in the municipality, but 85 students attended lower secondary school in a neighboring municipality. There were no upper Secondary classes or vocational classes, but there were 28 upper Secondary students and 72 upper Secondary vocational students who attended classes in another municipality. The municipality had no non-university Tertiary classes, but there were 3 non-university Tertiary students and 8 specialized Tertiary students who attended classes in another municipality.

As of 2000, there were 44 students in Vuisternens-devant-Romont who came from another municipality, while 50 residents attended schools outside the municipality.
