= Macconnens =

Former municipality, canton of Fribourg

- Former municipality
- Location of Macconnens
- Location within Switzerland Location within Canton of Fribourg
- Coordinates: 46°44′22.7″N 6°58′28.1″E
- Country: Switzerland
- Canton: Fribourg
- District: Glâne
- Municipality: Villaz

Population (1970)
  - Total: 71
- Time zone: UTC+01:00 (CET)
  - Summer (DST): UTC+02:00 (CEST)
- ISO 3166 code: CH-FR
- Website

Macconnens is a former municipality in the Glâne district of the canton of Fribourg, Switzerland, northeast of Romont on the left bank of the Glâne. In 1973 it merged with Villarimboud, and from 2005 it was part of the municipality of La Folliaz. In 2020 La Folliaz merged with Villaz-Saint-Pierre to form the municipality of Villaz.

== History ==
Macconnens is first mentioned in 1320 as Masconens. It was a small lordship under the House of Savoy. From the 14th century until about 1540 it was a fief of the de Billens family; it was then divided between Benoît du Moulin and the Lyon family of Pontarlier. In 1590 Macconnens became the property of the Brayer family of Romont, and in 1673 that of the d'Amman family, who sold it to the State of Fribourg in 1840.

Under the Ancien Régime, Macconnens belonged to the bailiwick of Romont (1536–1798); it then passed to the district of the same name (1798–1848) and in 1848 to the Glâne district. In church matters, the village separated from the parish of Torny-Pittet in 1845 and joined the newly founded parish of Villarimboud.

An old mill is mentioned in 1335. There is a molasse quarry. The village has remained mainly agricultural, with livestock farming and dairy production.

Macconnens had 61 inhabitants in 1811, 92 in 1850, 97 in 1900, 90 in 1950 and 71 in 1970. In 1973 it merged with Villarimboud.

== Bibliography ==
- A. d'Amman, "La seigneurie de Macconnens", in Annales fribourgeoises, 10, 1922, 105–111, 187–192, 229–237; 11, 1923, 36–37
- L. Page, Villarimboud et Macconnens, 1966 (State Archives of Fribourg)
