= Diesbach =

Diesbach may refer to:

- Anna de Diesbach (1844–1920), a French rose breeder
- De Diesbach Castle, a castle in the Swiss canton of Fribourg
- Diesbach de Belleroche, a French family granted the Honneurs de la Cour in 1773
- Diesbach (Glarus), a village in the Swiss canton of Glarus
- Diesbach (patrician family), a patrician family originally from the Swiss city of Bern
- Johann Jacob Diesbach, an 18th-century German dye maker, best known for creating the dye Prussian blue

== See also ==
- Diessbach bei Büren, a municipality in the Swiss canton of Bern
