= Villargiroud =

Former municipality, canton of Fribourg

- Former municipality
- Location of Villargiroud
- Location within Switzerland Location within Canton of Fribourg
- Coordinates: 46.700005°N 6.999996°E
- Country: Switzerland
- Canton: Fribourg
- District: Glâne
- Municipality: Villorsonnens

Population (2000)
  - Total: 377
- Time zone: UTC+01:00 (CET)
  - Summer (DST): UTC+02:00 (CEST)
- ISO 3166 code: CH-FR
- Website

Villargiroud is a former municipality in the Glâne district of the canton of Fribourg, Switzerland, on the western slope of the Gibloux. In 2001 it merged with Chavannes-sous-Orsonnens, Orsonnens and Villarsiviriaux to form the municipality of Villorsonnens.

== History ==
Villargiroud is first mentioned in 1259 as Villargirot, and in 1305 as Villargiroz. A Roman settlement (possibly an annex of a villa) was found in the forest of La Joux after Cyclone Lothar in 1999. Burgundian graves and a decorated belt-buckle plate were found in 1887.

In 1259 four brothers of Villargirot declared that they held twenty-four poses (a unit of land area) of fields as a hereditary fief from the abbey of Humilimont. The small lordship of Villargiroud was attached at times to that of Orsonnens and at times to the barony of Pont. In the 14th century it was owned by the lords of Pont; in the 15th century by the Estavayer, Rovéréa, Champion, Arsent and Challant families; in the 16th century by the Diesbach, the Techtermann, Marguerite de La Palud (the widow of Antoine de Gruyère), the Challant and the Alex (1579); and in the 17th and 18th centuries by the Wild family.

Villargiroud came under the overlordship of Fribourg in 1535 and from then on belonged to the bailiwick of Pont-Farvagny. In 1798 it was attached to the district of Romont, and from 1803 to 1848 to that of Farvagny. It has always belonged to the parish of Orsonnens.

Villargiroud, an agricultural village (livestock farming and fodder crops), has been taking on a residential character. It had 100 inhabitants in 1811, 144 in 1850, 239 in 1900, 264 in 1950 and 377 in 2000. In 2001 it became part of the municipality of Villorsonnens.

== Bibliography ==
- L. Grangier, "Les sépultures burgondes de Villargiroud", in Nouvelles étrennes fribourgeoises, 11, 1883, 55
- A. Dellion, Dictionnaire historique et statistique des paroisses catholiques du canton de Fribourg, 1884–1902, 9, 61–62
- R. Chassot, Les prêtres d'Orsonnens, 1908
