= Villaz, Switzerland =

Villaz
- Municipality
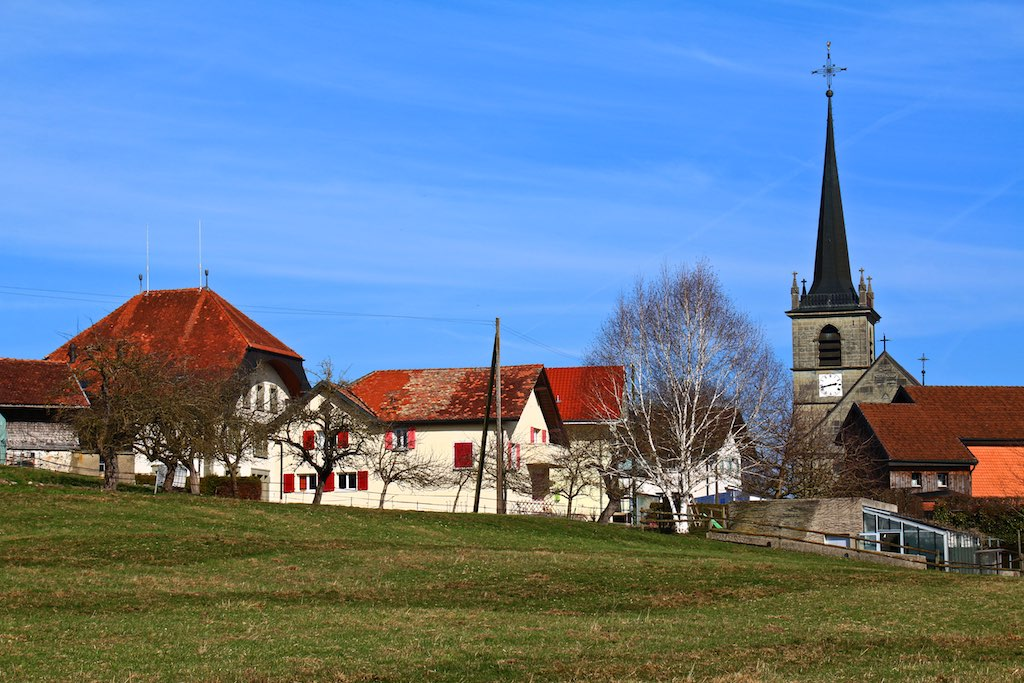
- Neyruz village, part of Villaz St Pierre

- Coat of arms
- Location of Villaz
- Location within Switzerland Location within Canton of Fribourg
- Coordinates: 46°43′N 6°57′E
- Country: Switzerland
- Canton: Fribourg
- District: Glâne

Government
  - Mayor: Syndic

Area
  - Total: 15.43 km^{2} (5.96 sq mi)

Population (December 2020)
  - Total: 2,310
  - Density: 150/km^{2} (388/sq mi)
- Time zone: UTC+01:00 (CET)
  - Summer (DST): UTC+02:00 (CEST)
- Postal code: 1690, 1691
- SFOS number: 2117
- ISO 3166 code: CH-FR
- Surrounded by: Châtonnaye, Massonnens, Mézières, Romont, Sédeilles (in Vaud), Villorsonnens
- Website: https://www.communevillaz.ch/

Villaz (Arpitan: Vela or Velâ [ˈvəla]) is a municipality in the district of Glâne in the canton of Fribourg in Switzerland. On 1 January 2020 the former municipalities of Villaz-Saint-Pierre and La Folliaz merged to form the new municipality of Villaz.

== History ==
=== Villaz ===
Villaz-Saint-Pierre is first mentioned in 1177 as Villa.

=== Villarimboud ===
Villarimboud is first mentioned in 1142 as Vilarrimolth.

=== Lussy ===
Lussy is first mentioned in the 12th century as Lussiei.

== Geography ==
After the merger, Villaz has an area, (as of the 2004/09 survey), of 15.43 km^{2} (5.96 sq mi).

== Demographics ==
The new municipality has a population (as of December 2020) of 2,310.

== Historic Population ==
The historical population is given in the following chart: La Folliaz was formed on 1 January 2005 from the union of the former municipalities of Lussy and Villarimboud.

== Transportation ==
The municipality has a railway station, Villaz-St-Pierre, on the Lausanne–Bern line. It has regular service to Romont FR and Fribourg/Freiburg.
