= Villarsiviriaux =

Former municipality, canton of Fribourg

- Former municipality
- Location of Villarsiviriaux
- Location within Switzerland Location within Canton of Fribourg
- Coordinates: 46.700005°N 7.016666°E
- Country: Switzerland
- Canton: Fribourg
- District: Glâne
- Municipality: Villorsonnens

Population (2000)
  - Total: 189
- Time zone: UTC+01:00 (CET)
  - Summer (DST): UTC+02:00 (CEST)
- ISO 3166 code: CH-FR
- Website

Villarsiviriaux is a former municipality in the Glâne district of the canton of Fribourg, Switzerland. It is a nucleated village on the northwestern slope of the Gibloux. In 2001 it merged with Chavannes-sous-Orsonnens, Orsonnens and Villargiroud to form the municipality of Villorsonnens.

== History ==
Villarsiviriaux is first mentioned in 1162 as Vilar Soveror. Remains of a Roman settlement have been found at La Buchille.

The lords of Villarsiviriaux are recorded in the 13th century. From the Middle Ages, the abbeys of Hauterive and Humilimont and several families (Billens, Maggenberg, de Pont, d'Affry) shared rights and property in Villarsiviriaux. In 1508 the lordship belonged to Jean de Blonay. Villarsiviriaux was part of the bailiwick of Pont-Farvagny from 1488 to 1798, then of the districts of Romont (1798–1803), Farvagny (1803–1848) and Glâne (from 1848). The first municipal statutes date from 1765.

In church matters Villarsiviriaux belonged to Orsonnens; it became a parish in 1869. The chapel of Saint-Théodule, mentioned in 1483, was enlarged around 1790. Villargiroud and Villarsiviriaux marked out the boundaries of their pastures in 1581, and the boundary with Sorens was marked with boundary stones in 1626.

Villarsiviriaux is a rural village (agriculture, with fruit growing at the beginning of the 20th century) that has concentrated on livestock farming; in 2000 it had twelve farms. It had 179 inhabitants in 1850, 240 in 1900, 205 in 1950 and 189 in 2000. In 2001 it became part of the municipality of Villorsonnens.

== Bibliography ==
- A. Dellion, Dictionnaire historique et statistique des paroisses catholiques du canton de Fribourg, 1884–1902, 12, 70–80
- J.-P. Anderegg, La maison paysanne fribourgeoise, 2, 1987, 85, 450
