= Torny-le-Grand =

Former municipality, canton of Fribourg

- Former municipality
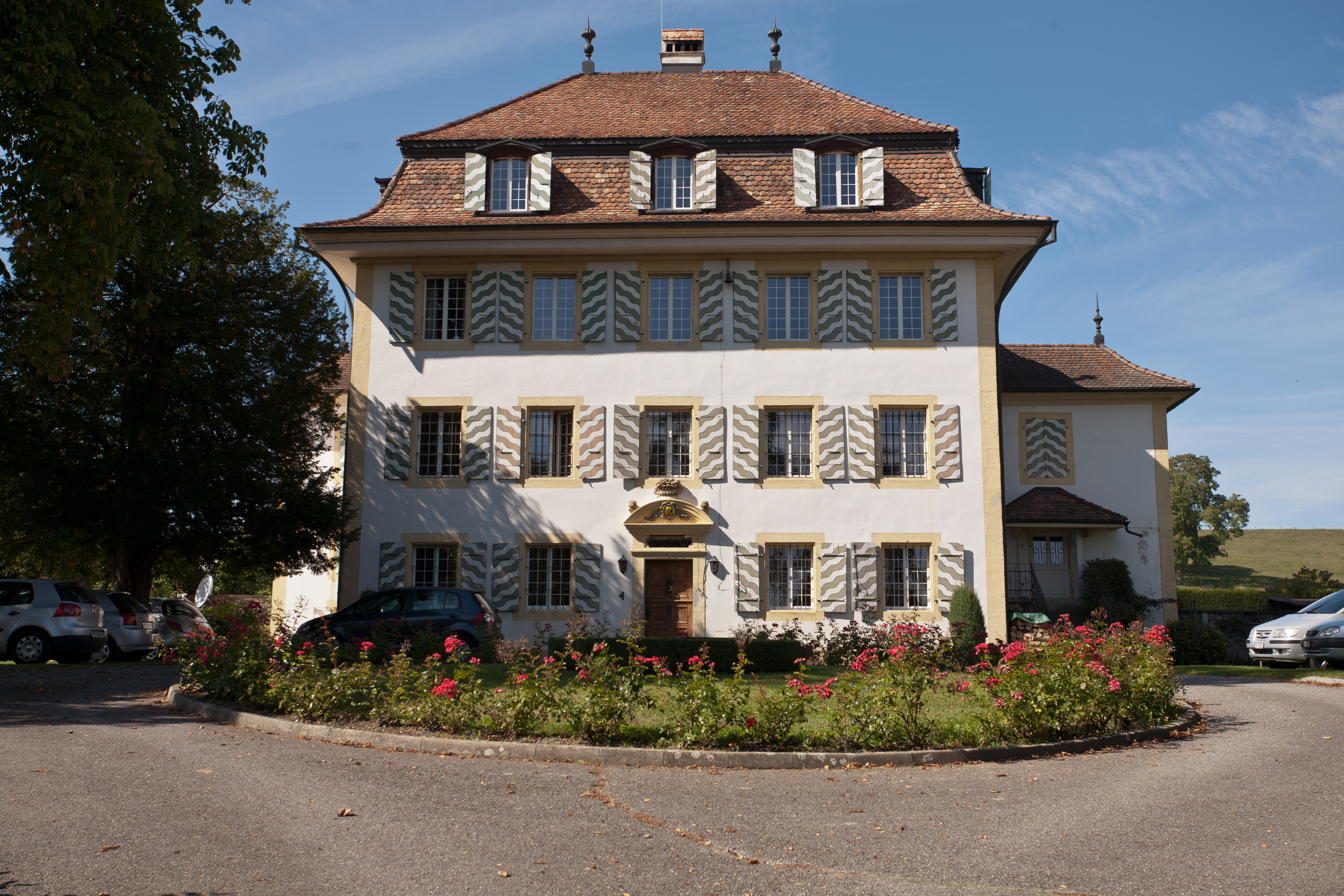
- De Diesbach Castle

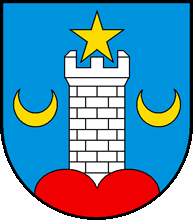
- Coat of arms
- Location of Torny-le-Grand
- Location within Switzerland Location within Canton of Fribourg
- Coordinates: 46.7707°N 6.9656°E
- Country: Switzerland
- Canton: Fribourg
- District: Glâne
- Municipality: Torny

Population (2000)
  - Total: 327
- Time zone: UTC+01:00 (CET)
  - Summer (DST): UTC+02:00 (CEST)
- SFOS number: 2101
- ISO 3166 code: CH-FR
- Website

Torny-le-Grand (former German name Grosstorny) is a former municipality in the Glâne district of the canton of Fribourg, Switzerland, in the valley of the Arbogne. In 2004 it merged with Middes to form the municipality of Torny.

== History ==
Torny-le-Grand is first mentioned in 765/766 as Taurniaco superiore. Hallstatt graves and tumuli and Roman tiles have been found there. In 766 the Abbey of Saint-Maurice received rights and properties in Torny-le-Grand; in 929 it gave up their usufruct to Turimbert, probably a count in the Kingdom of Burgundy. A Torny family is recorded from the 12th century. The lordship belonged to the House of Savoy until 1360 and then had various owners, among them the Diesbach family (1602–1798). Torny-le-Grand was attached to the bailiwick of Romont in 1536, then to the districts of Payerne in 1798, Romont in 1803 and Montagny in 1815, and to that of Dompierre from 1830 to 1848.

In church matters, Torny-le-Grand was a filial church of Torny-Pittet and became a parish in 1630. There was a chapel of Saint Nicholas from the 15th century; the parish church was consecrated in 1698 and rebuilt in 1754–1755, with the funerary monument of Prince Fridéric de Diesbach. The castle, built by the Diesbach-Torny family between 1730 and 1745, housed the Sisters of the Cross of Chavanod from 1904 to 1974; they had their novitiate there and later a girls' school.

In 1965–1966 the army installed one of its six firing positions for Bloodhound surface-to-air missiles at Torny-le-Grand; it was decommissioned in 1999. Torny-le-Grand has remained agricultural, with livestock farming and cereal and fodder crops. It had 198 inhabitants in 1811, 283 in 1850, 344 in 1900, 308 in 1950, 254 in 1970 and 327 in 2000. In 2004 it merged with Middes to form Torny.

== Bibliography ==
- Y. Longchamp, Commune Torny-le-Grand, 1988
- E. Castellari Zahir, "Un château menacé d'asphyxie", in Patrimoine fribourgeois, 1, 1992, 47–52
- Helvetia Sacra, VIII/2, 496–499, 656
- G. Brodard, "Le monument funéraire de Jean-Frideric de Diesbach à Torny-le-Grand", in Patrimoine fribourgeois, 19, 2010, 5–9
