= Lussy, Fribourg =

Former municipality, canton of Fribourg

Lussy
- Former municipality
- Coat of arms
- Location of Lussy
- Location within Switzerland Location within Canton of Fribourg
- Coordinates: 46°42′55.8″N 6°56′40.8″E
- Country: Switzerland
- Canton: Fribourg
- District: Glâne
- Municipality: Villaz

Population (2004)
  - Total: 393
- Time zone: UTC+01:00 (CET)
  - Summer (DST): UTC+02:00 (CEST)
- ISO 3166 code: CH-FR
- Website

Lussy is a former municipality in the Glâne district of the canton of Fribourg, Switzerland, northeast of Romont. Since 2020 it has been part of the municipality of Villaz; in 2005 it had merged with Villarimboud to form the municipality of La Folliaz. Lussy comprised the street village of the same name and scattered farms.

== History ==
Lussy is first mentioned in the 12th century as Lussiei. A bronze statuette of Minerva and the remains of a Gallo-Roman villa were found there, as well as about a hundred graves in an early medieval cemetery at the place called Fin de l'Illaz. Through donations and purchases in the 12th to 14th centuries, Hauterive Abbey came to own several pieces of land at Lussy and a large farming estate (a grange).

Lussy was part of the county of Romont until 1536 and was then incorporated into the bailiwick of Romont (1536–1798) and the district of the same name (1798–1848). In church matters the village has always belonged to the parish of Villaz-Saint-Pierre. The chapel of Saint John the Baptist, recorded from 1649, was restored in 1784 and enlarged in 1925.

Lussy has kept its agricultural character, with 14 farms in 2003 (milk production and maize and rapeseed growing), while also developing as a residential area. The Montagne de Lussy is a training and firing ground of the army.

Lussy had 179 inhabitants in 1811, 226 in 1850, 297 in 1900, 300 in 1950, 366 in 2000 and 393 in 2004. In 2005 it merged with Villarimboud to form La Folliaz, and since 2020 it has been part of Villaz.

== Bibliography ==
- G. Bourquenoud, "Lussy. Un village allongé sur ses terres", in Fribourg illustré, 1992/3, 13–16
