= Orsonnens =

Former municipality, canton of Fribourg

- Former municipality
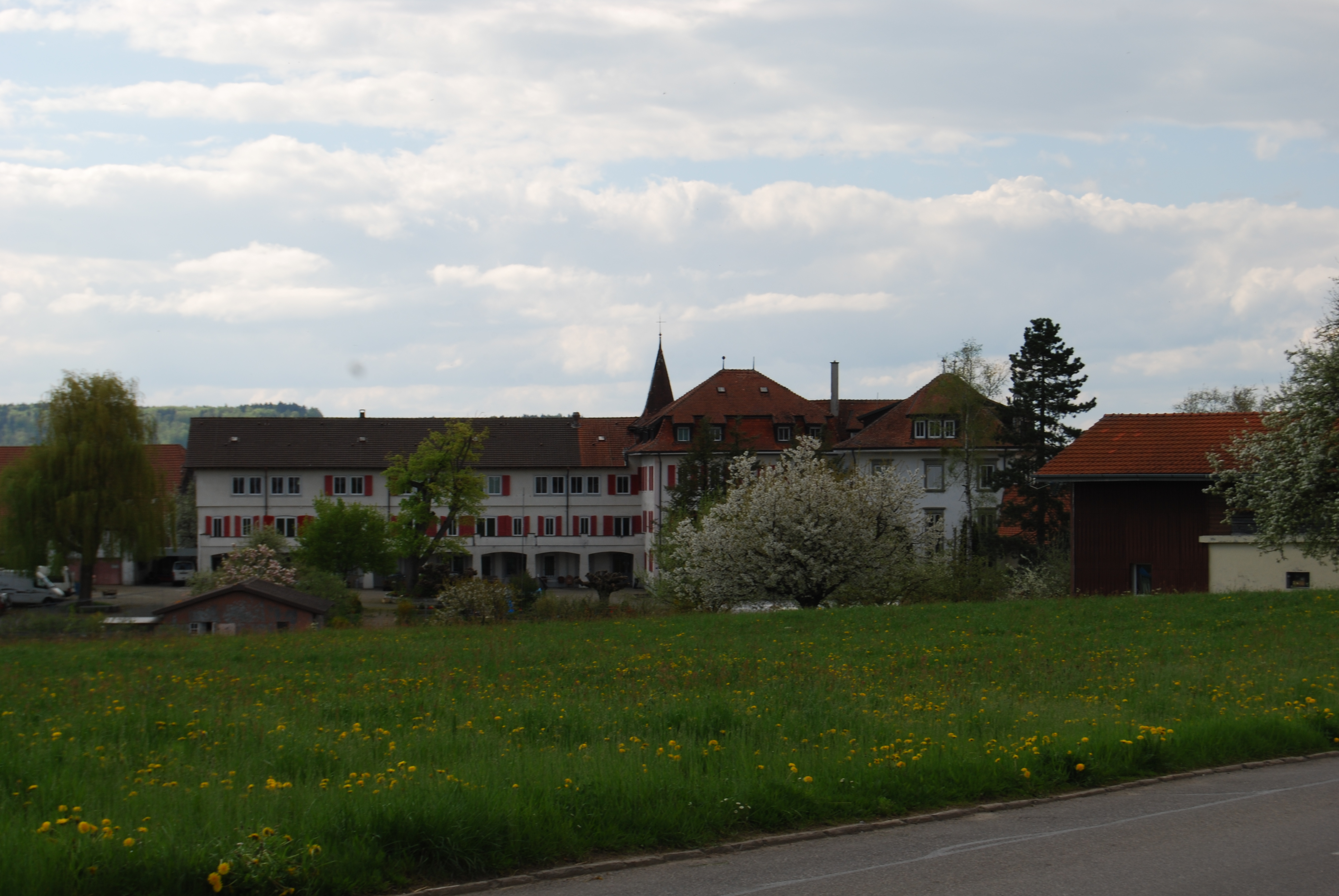

- Coat of arms
- Location of Orsonnens
- Location within Switzerland Location within Canton of Fribourg
- Coordinates: 46.716665°N 7.000004°E
- Country: Switzerland
- Canton: Fribourg
- District: Glâne
- Municipality: Villorsonnens

Population (2000)
  - Total: 302
- Time zone: UTC+01:00 (CET)
  - Summer (DST): UTC+02:00 (CEST)
- ISO 3166 code: CH-FR
- Website

Orsonnens (old German name Orsonning) is a former municipality in the Glâne district of the canton of Fribourg, Switzerland, on the slopes of the Gibloux. Since 2001, after merging with Chavannes-sous-Orsonnens, Villargiroud and Villarsiviriaux, it has been part of the municipality of Villorsonnens.

== History ==
Orsonnens is first mentioned in 1138 as Orsenens. Mounds (possibly Hallstatt tumuli) and numerous fragments of Roman tiles have been found there.

The lordship of Orsonnens, a fief of the barony of Pont-en-Ogoz, belonged to the de Pont family in the 12th and 13th centuries. The lordship then came under the House of Savoy, and in 1448, during the war between Savoy and the Habsburgs, the village was burned by the Fribourgeois. The lordship passed successively to the Billens, Alex, Mayor de Lutry (who rebuilt the upper castle, the château d'En Haut, in 1629), Montenach (who restored the lower castle in the 17th century) and Odet families; the Odet held it until 1879. In 1486 Fribourg bought Orsonnens and attached it to the new bailiwick of Farvagny. Orsonnens was later part of the district of Farvagny until 1848.

The parish of Orsonnens, mentioned in 1143, included Chavannes-sous-Orsonnens and Villargiroud; Ferlens and Massonnens separated from it in 1665, and Villarsiviriaux in 1869. The advowson (collature) belonged to the bishop of Lausanne, to the chapter, and then, from 1551 to 1925, to the collegiate church of Saint-Nicolas. The church of Saint-Pierre was rebuilt by Fernand Dumas in 1935–1936.

From 1891 to 1977 the Ursulines ran a home economics school, Sainte-Marie, in the upper castle; since 1979 the castle has housed the monastery of Notre-Dame de Fatima, of Vietnamese Cistercians. The drug rehabilitation center Le Radeau opened in 1975. In 1994 Fromagerie Moléson SA, founded in 1965, replaced the village dairies of the region; in 2006 it was supplied by more than fifty producers and made specialties with a controlled designation of origin (AOC). Agriculture consists of livestock farming and the growing of fodder crops and cereals.

Orsonnens had 231 inhabitants in 1811, 340 in 1850, 417 in 1900, 465 in 1950, 257 in 1980 and 302 in 2000. In 2001 it became part of the municipality of Villorsonnens.

== Bibliography ==
- H. de Schaller, "Orsonnens", in Nouvelles étrennes fribourgeoises, 30, 1896, 53–59
- A. Dellion, Dictionnaire historique et statistique des paroisses catholiques du canton de Fribourg, 1884–1902, 9, 56–85
- R. Chassot, Les prêtres d'Orsonnens, 1908
- L'Echo illustré, 15 September 1979
- La Liberté, 31 December 1992
- M.-Th. Torche-Julmy et al., "L'église d'Orsonnens, son décor et sa restauration", in Patrimoine fribourgeois, 15, 2003, 56–64
