= Middes =

Former municipality, canton of Fribourg

- Former municipality
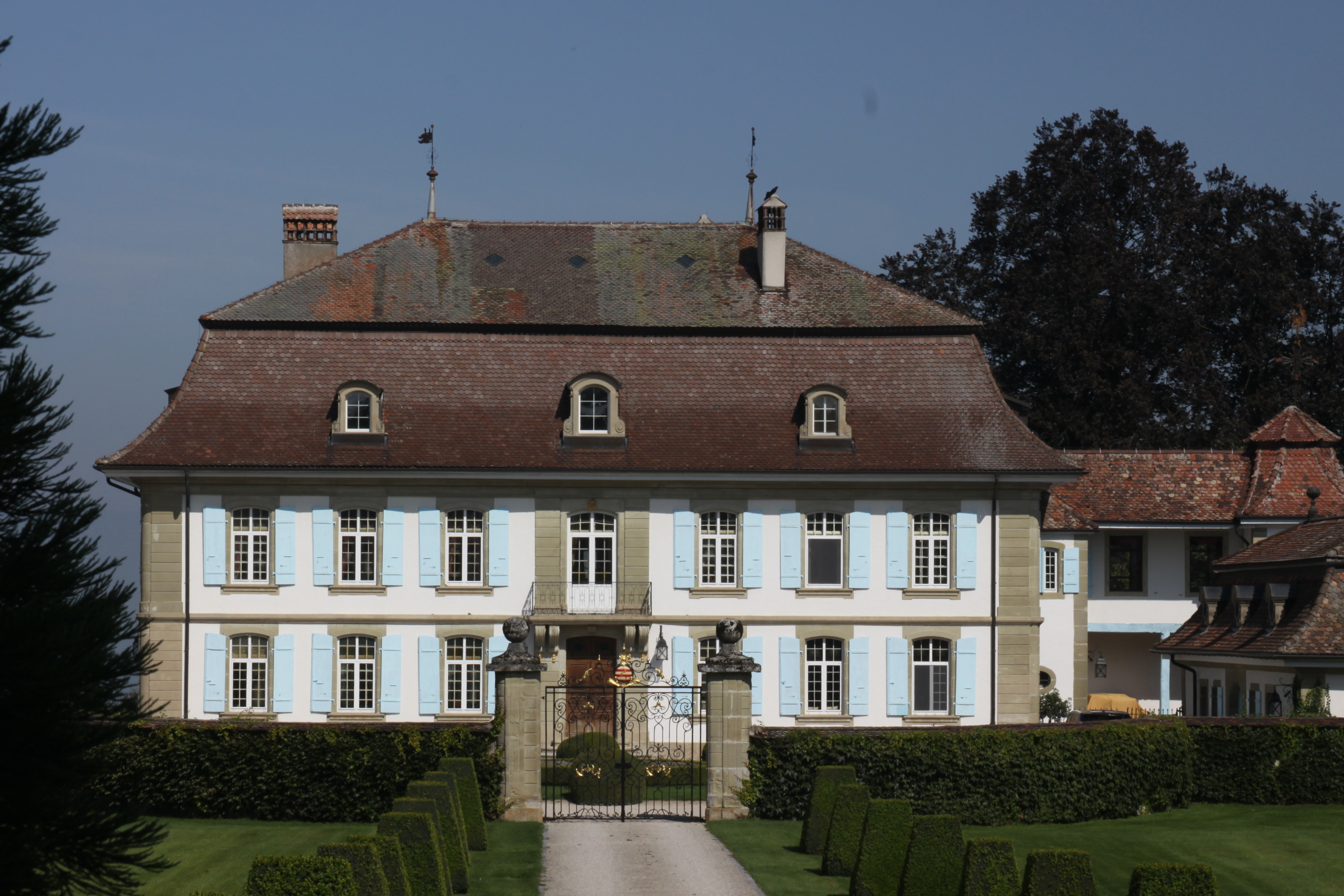
- Griset de Forel Castle

- Coat of arms
- Location of Middes
- Location within Switzerland Location within Canton of Fribourg
- Coordinates: 46.766666°N 6.950007°E
- Country: Switzerland
- Canton: Fribourg
- District: Glâne
- Municipality: Torny

Population (2000)
  - Total: 327
- Time zone: UTC+01:00 (CET)
  - Summer (DST): UTC+02:00 (CEST)
- SFOS number: 2088
- ISO 3166 code: CH-FR
- Website

Middes is a former municipality in the Glâne district of the canton of Fribourg, Switzerland. It overlooks the plain of the Broye and borders the canton of Vaud. Torny-Pittet was incorporated into Middes in 1848, and in 2004 Middes merged with Torny-le-Grand to form the municipality of Torny.

== History ==
Middes is first mentioned in 930 as Mildes. A La Tène grave and isolated finds from the Roman period have been discovered there. In the early Middle Ages Middes was among the possessions of the Abbey of Saint-Maurice. From the 13th to the 16th century the lordship belonged to the lords of Villarzel, then to the Loys, Reyff and Lanthen-Heid families and finally to the Griset de Forel, who had their castle built by Jean Paul Nader in 1748.

Middes was part of the bailiwick of Montagny from 1478 to 1798, then of the districts of Payerne (1798), Montagny (1803) and Dompierre (1831–1848). In church matters, it has always belonged to the parish of Torny-Pittet. Numerous witch trials took place in the 16th and 17th centuries.

A dairy cooperative (société de laiterie) was founded in 1888. Middes has a mechanical workshop, and agriculture and livestock farming are practiced; there were sixteen farms in 2000. Middes had 170 inhabitants in 1811, 262 in 1850, 345 in 1900, 341 in 1950, 255 in 1980 and 327 in 2000. In 2004 it merged with Torny-le-Grand to form Torny.

== Bibliography ==
- A. Dellion, Dictionnaire historique et statistique des paroisses catholiques du canton de Fribourg, 1884–1902, 11, 218–223
- H. Perrochon, "Middes et son château", in Annales fribourgeoises, 22, 1934, 66–78
