= Villarimboud =

Former municipality, canton of Fribourg

- Former municipality
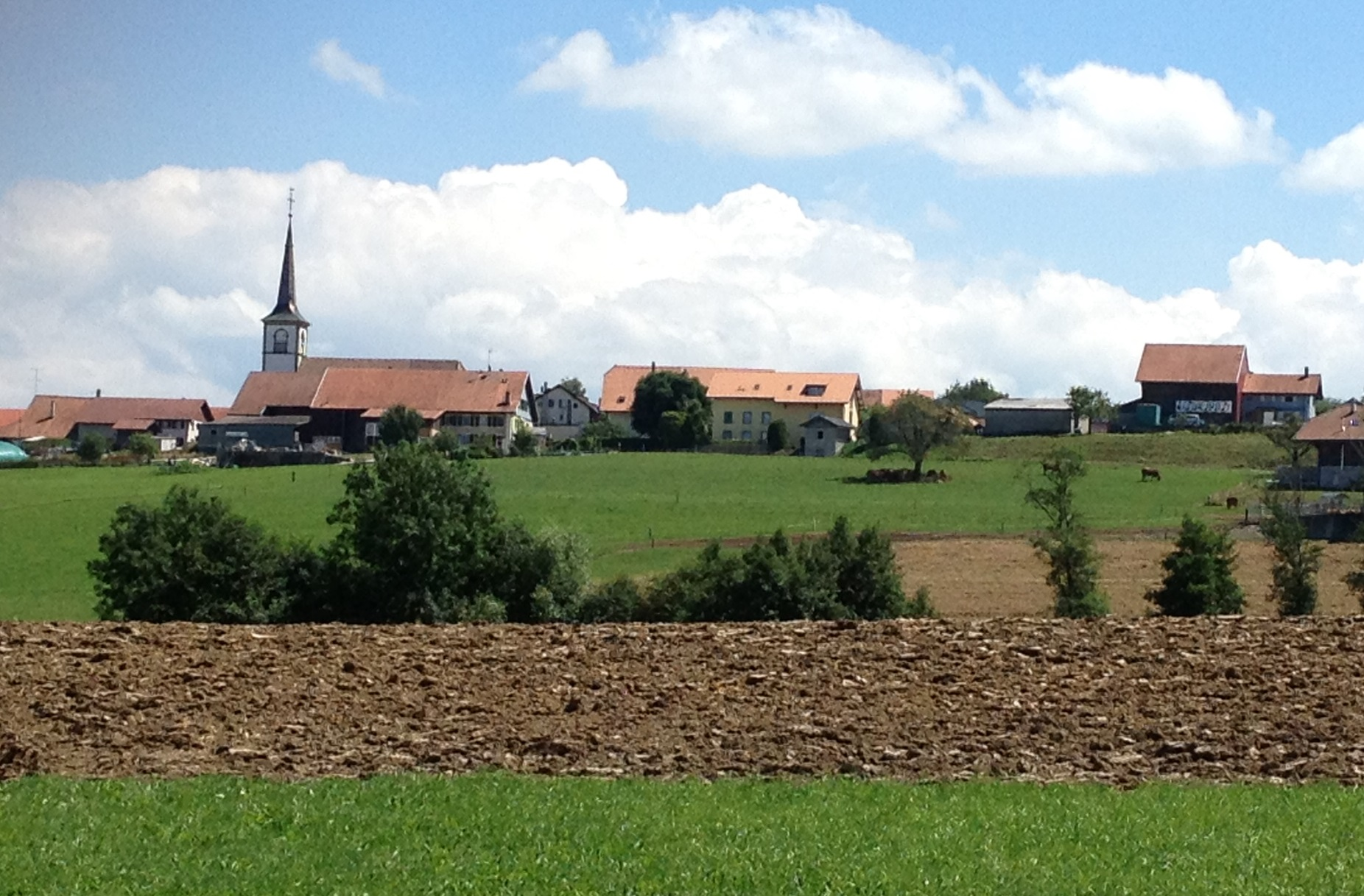

- Coat of arms
- Location of Villarimboud
- Location within Switzerland Location within Canton of Fribourg
- Coordinates: 46°44′22.2″N 6°57′45.1″E
- Country: Switzerland
- Canton: Fribourg
- District: Glâne
- Municipality: Villaz

Population (2004)
  - Total: 498
- Time zone: UTC+01:00 (CET)
  - Summer (DST): UTC+02:00 (CEST)
- ISO 3166 code: CH-FR
- Website

Villarimboud is a former municipality in the Glâne district of the canton of Fribourg, Switzerland, between the valleys of the Glâne and the Arbogne. Villarimboud absorbed Macconnens in 1973 and from 2005 to 2019 formed the municipality of La Folliaz with Lussy. When La Folliaz merged with Villaz-Saint-Pierre in 2020, Villarimboud became part of the municipality of Villaz.

== History ==
Villarimboud is first mentioned in 1142 as Vilarrimolth. Hallstatt tumuli and fragments of Roman pottery and tiles were discovered in the 19th century.

The small lordship of Villarimboud, mentioned from the 12th century, was divided among several co-lords; in 1536 these were the Goumoëns, Curtille and Musard families. The de Villarimboud family were benefactors of Hauterive Abbey, and the Premonstratensians of Humilimont owned land in Villarimboud. The village was burned by the Fribourgeois in 1448 during the war with Savoy. From 1536 it came under the bailiwick of Romont, and from 1798 to 1848 under the district of the same name.

In church matters the village tried from the 16th century to separate from Torny-Pittet, but it became a parish, together with Macconnens, only in 1844. When the chaplaincy of Villarimboud was founded in 1337, the chapel, mentioned from 1145 and dedicated to the Virgin Mary, was consecrated to Saint Theodulus. The parish church was built between 1841 and 1844. A school is mentioned in 1768.

Peat bogs were worked from 1939 to 1945. The village has kept its agricultural character, with fodder and cereal crops and livestock farming. Villarimboud had 235 inhabitants in 1811, 278 in 1850, 377 in 1900, 373 in 1950, 253 in 1970, 461 in 2000 and 498 in 2004. In 2005 it merged with Lussy to form La Folliaz, which became part of Villaz in 2020.

== Bibliography ==
- R. Chassot, L'école de Villarimboud. Notice historique présentée à la Conférence régionale des instituteurs du Nord de la Glâne à Villarimboud (février 1904), 1906
- L. Page, Villarimboud et Macconnens. Monographie villageoise, [c. 1965]

=== Archives ===
- Card index, State Archives of Fribourg (Archives de l'Etat de Fribourg)
