= Beaufort-en-Santerre =

- Commune
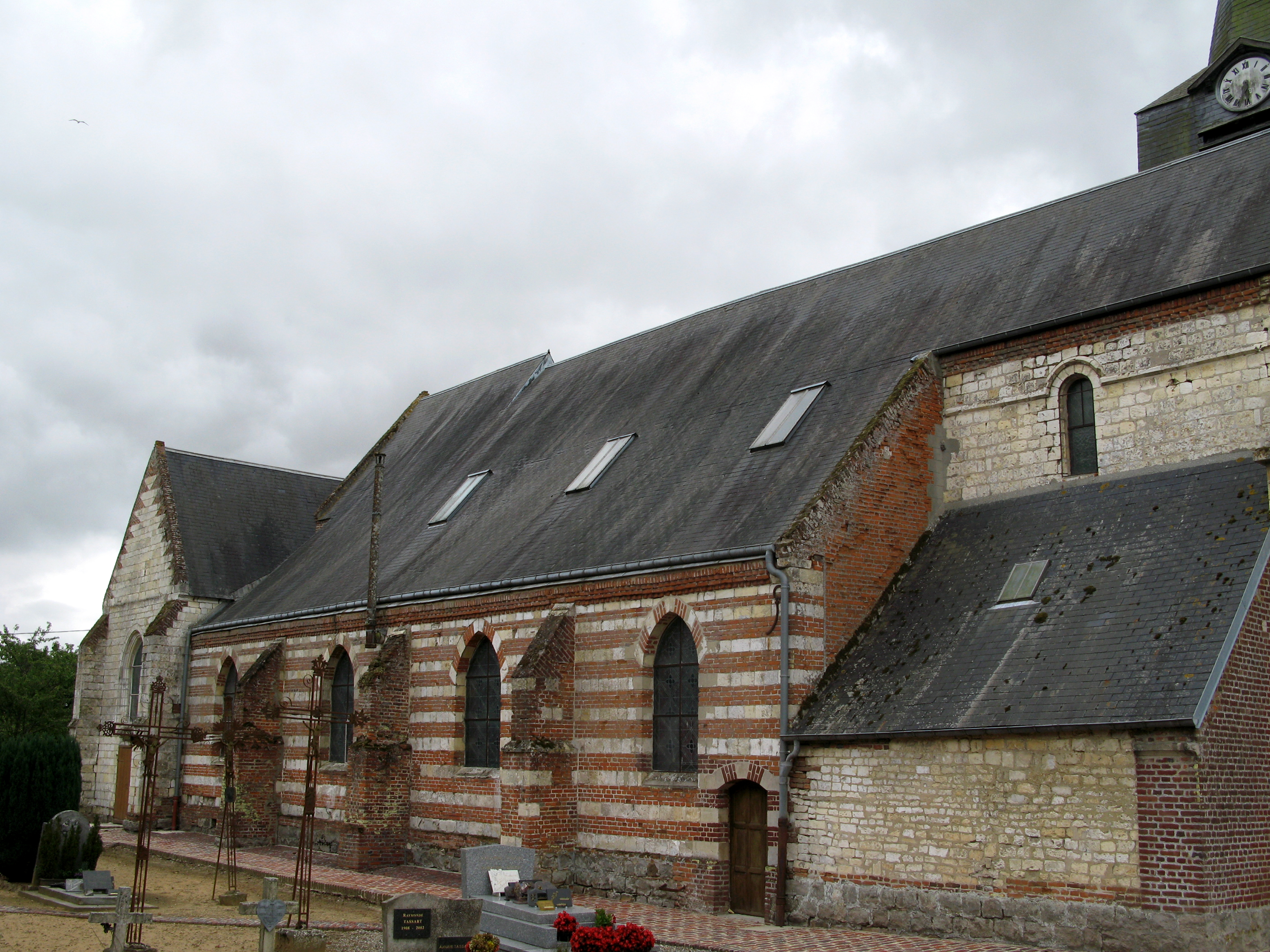
- The church in Beaufort-en-Santerre
- Location of Beaufort-en-Santerre
- Location within France Location within Hauts-de-France
- Coordinates: 49°46′34″N 2°40′09″E
- Country: France
- Region: Hauts-de-France
- Department: Somme
- Arrondissement: Péronne
- Canton: Moreuil
- Intercommunality: CC Terre de Picardie

Government
  - Mayor (2020–2026): Arnaud Coquart
- Area^{1}: 4.59 km^{2} (1.77 sq mi)
- Elevation: 90 m (300 ft)
- Highest elevation: 98 m (322 ft)
- Lowest elevation: 84 m (276 ft)
- Population (2023): 193
  - Density: 42.0/km^{2} (109/sq mi)
- Time zone: UTC+01:00 (CET)
  - Summer (DST): UTC+02:00 (CEST)
- INSEE/Postal code: 80067 /80170
- ^{1} French Land Register data, which excludes lakes, ponds, glaciers > 1 km^{2} (0.386 sq mi or 247 acres) and river estuaries.

Beaufort-en-Santerre (French pronunciation: [bofɔʁ ɑ̃ sɑ̃tɛʁ], literally Beaufort in Santerre; Picard: Bieufort-in-Santérre) is a commune in the Somme department in Hauts-de-France in northern France.

== Geography ==
The commune is situated on the junction of the D329 and D161 roads, 25 kilometres (16 mi) southeast of Amiens.

== Population ==
Historical population
Year	Pop.	±% p.a.
1968	103	—
1975	95	−1.15%
1982	116	+2.89%
1990	133	+1.72%
1999	138	+0.41%
2007	165	+2.26%
2012	192	+3.08%
2017	204	+1.22%
2023	193	−0.92%
Source: INSEE

== See also ==
- Communes of the Somme department
- Anna de Diesbach
