= Torny-Pittet =

Hamlet in the canton of Fribourg

- Hamlet
- Location within Switzerland Location within Canton of Fribourg
- Coordinates: 46°46′25″N 6°56′45″E
- Country: Switzerland
- Canton: Fribourg
- Municipality: Torny

Torny-Pittet, also called Torny-le-Petit or Torny-Inférieur, is a hamlet in the former municipality of Middes in the Glâne district of the canton of Fribourg, Switzerland. In 2004 Middes merged with Torny-le-Grand to form the municipality of Torny. Torny-Pittet was incorporated into Middes in 1848.

== History ==
Torny-Pittet was part of the lordship of Montagny. In 1248 Pierre de Vilar gave all his lands in Torny-Pittet to Peter II of Savoy, who granted them back to him as a fief. After it was burned by the Fribourgeois in 1448, Torny-Pittet was incorporated into the bailiwick of Montagny. It was attached to the district of Payerne in 1798, to that of Montagny in 1803 and to that of Dompierre from 1830 to 1848.

The bishop of Lausanne founded a church of Saint Martin at Torny-Pittet in the 9th or 10th century. It was rebuilt in 1743 and in 1813–1823, and received new stained-glass windows in 1989. The parish included Trey, Torny-le-Grand, Middes, Châtonnaye and Villarimboud, which separated from it between 1526 and 1845. The right of collation (collature) belonged to the cathedral chapter of Lausanne, to the State of Fribourg and, from 1867, to the diocese of Lausanne.

== Bibliography ==
- A. Dellion, Dictionnaire historique et statistique des paroisses catholiques du canton de Fribourg, 11, 216–223 (partly erroneous)
- La Liberté, 11/12 November 1989
- G. Pfulg, Vitraux modernes Romont (FR) et environs, 1991
