= Villarzel =

- Municipality
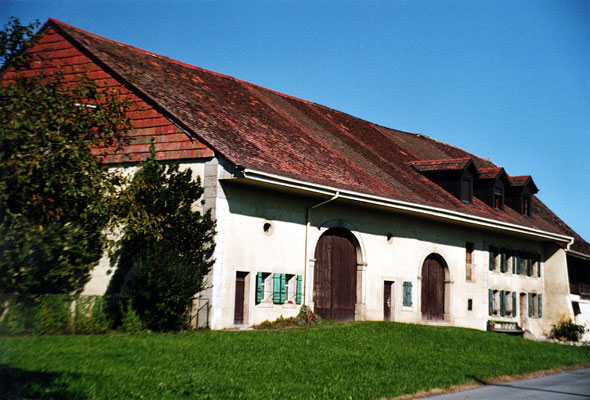
- Farm house in Sédeilles village

- Flag Coat of arms
- Location of Villarzel
- Location within Switzerland Location within Canton of Vaud
- Coordinates: 46°45′N 6°55′E
- Country: Switzerland
- Canton: Vaud
- District: Broye-Vully

Government
  - Mayor: Syndic

Area
  - Total: 4.06 km^{2} (1.57 sq mi)
- Elevation: 622 m (2,041 ft)

Population (2003)
  - Total: 177
  - Density: 43.6/km^{2} (113/sq mi)
- Time zone: UTC+01:00 (CET)
  - Summer (DST): UTC+02:00 (CEST)
- Postal code: 1555
- SFOS number: 5830
- ISO 3166 code: CH-VD
- Surrounded by: Cerniaz, Châtonnaye (FR), Henniez, Marnand, Rossens, Sédeilles, Villars-Bramard
- Website: https://www.villarzel.ch/

Villarzel is a municipality in the district of Broye-Vully in the canton of Vaud in Switzerland. On 1 July 2006, Villarzel incorporated the formerly independent municipalities of Rossens and Sédeilles.

== Geography ==
Aerial view (1963)

Villarzel has an area, as of 2009, of 7.7 square kilometers (3.0 mi^{2}). Of this area, 5.39 km^{2} (2.08 mi^{2}) or 70.4% is used for agricultural purposes, while 1.85 km^{2} (0.71 mi^{2}) or 24.2% is forested. Of the rest of the land, 0.44 km^{2} (0.17 mi^{2}) or 5.7% is settled (buildings or roads).

Of the built up area, housing and buildings made up 2.6% and transportation infrastructure made up 3.1%. Out of the forested land, all of the forested land area is covered with heavy forests. Of the agricultural land, 51.3% is used for growing crops and 17.0% is pastures, while 2.1% is used for orchards or vine crops.

The municipality was part of the Payerne District until it was dissolved on 31 August 2006, and Villarzel became part of the new district of Broye-Vully.

== Coat of arms ==
The blazon of the municipal coat of arms is Per fess Argent and Gules, overall a Tower roofed Sable, masoned and windowed Argent.

== Demographics ==
Villarzel has a population (as of December 2020) of 477. As of 2008, 6.4% of the population are resident foreign nationals. Over the last 10 years (1999–2009 ) the population has changed at a rate of 1.1%. It has changed at a rate of 2.1% due to migration and at a rate of 0% due to births and deaths.

Most of the population (as of 2000) speaks French (175 or 92.1%), with German being second most common (9 or 4.7%) and Portuguese being third (3 or 1.6%).

The age distribution, as of 2009, in Villarzel is; 33 children or 8.6% of the population are between 0 and 9 years old and 46 teenagers or 12.0% are between 10 and 19. Of the adult population, 49 people or 12.8% of the population are between 20 and 29 years old. 49 people or 12.8% are between 30 and 39, 61 people or 16.0% are between 40 and 49, and 45 people or 11.8% are between 50 and 59. The senior population distribution is 41 people or 10.7% of the population are between 60 and 69 years old, 31 people or 8.1% are between 70 and 79, there are 25 people or 6.5% who are between 80 and 89, and there are 2 people or 0.5% who are 90 and older.

As of 2000, there were 77 people who were single and never married in the municipality. There were 97 married individuals, 9 widows or widowers and 7 individuals who are divorced.

As of 2000, there were 155 private households in the municipality, and an average of 2.4 persons per household. There were 16 households that consist of only one person and 11 households with five or more people. Out of a total of 73 households that answered this question, 21.9% were households made up of just one person and there were 2 adults who lived with their parents. Of the rest of the households, there are 24 married couples without children, 25 married couples with children There were 4 single parents with a child or children. There was 1 household that was made up of unrelated people and 1 household that was made up of some sort of institution or another collective housing.

In 2000 there were 34 single family homes (or 53.1% of the total) out of a total of 64 inhabited buildings. There were 10 multi-family buildings (15.6%), along with 17 multi-purpose buildings that were mostly used for housing (26.6%) and 3 other use buildings (commercial or industrial) that also had some housing (4.7%).

In 2000, a total of 72 apartments (86.7% of the total) were permanently occupied, while 7 apartments (8.4%) were seasonally occupied and 4 apartments (4.8%) were empty. As of 2009, the construction rate of new housing units was 0 new units per 1000 residents. The vacancy rate for the municipality, in 2010, was 4.37%.

The historical population is given in the following chart:

== Sights ==
The entire village of Villarzel is designated as part of the Inventory of Swiss Heritage Sites.

== Politics ==
In the 2007 federal election the most popular party was the SVP which received 37.48% of the vote. The next three most popular parties were the FDP (20.72%), the SP (15.43%) and the Green Party (14.04%). In the federal election, a total of 142 votes were cast, and the voter turnout was 50.0%.

== Economy ==
As of 2010, Villarzel had an unemployment rate of 1.5%. As of 2008, there were 51 people employed in the primary economic sector and about 19 businesses involved in this sector. 17 people were employed in the secondary sector and there were 4 businesses in this sector. 23 people were employed in the tertiary sector, with 8 businesses in this sector. There were 86 residents of the municipality who were employed in some capacity, of which females made up 40.7% of the workforce.

In 2008 the total number of full-time equivalent jobs was 72. The number of jobs in the primary sector was 37, of which 34 were in agriculture and 4 were in forestry or lumber production. The number of jobs in the secondary sector was 16 of which 13 or (81.3%) were in manufacturing and 3 (18.8%) were in construction. The number of jobs in the tertiary sector was 19. In the tertiary sector; 11 or 57.9% were in the movement and storage of goods, 4 or 21.1% were in a hotel or restaurant, 1 was in the information industry, 1 was in education.

In 2000, there were 3 workers who commuted into the municipality and 52 workers who commuted away. The municipality is a net exporter of workers, with about 17.3 workers leaving the municipality for every one entering. Of the working population, 5.6% used public transportation to get to work, and 55.3% used a private car.

== Religion ==
From the 2000 census, 33 or 17.4% were Roman Catholic, while 127 or 66.8% belonged to the Swiss Reformed Church. Of the rest of the population, there was 1 individual who belongs to another Christian church. There was 1 individual who was Islamic. 26 (or about 13.68% of the population) belonged to no church, are agnostic or atheist, and 2 individuals (or about 1.05% of the population) did not answer the question.

== Education ==
In Villarzel about 55 or (28.9%) of the population have completed non-mandatory upper secondary education, and 24 or (12.6%) have completed additional higher education (either university or a Fachhochschule). Of the 24 who completed tertiary schooling, 54.2% were Swiss men, 37.5% were Swiss women.

In the 2009/2010 school year there were a total of 34 students in the Villarzel school district. In the Vaud cantonal school system, two years of non-obligatory pre-school are provided by the political districts. During the school year, the political district provided pre-school care for a total of 155 children of which 83 children (53.5%) received subsidized pre-school care. The canton's primary school program requires students to attend for four years. There were 12 students in the municipal primary school program. The obligatory lower secondary school program lasts for six years and there were 22 students in those schools.

As of 2000, there were 19 students in Villarzel who came from another municipality, while 36 residents attended schools outside the municipality.
