= Béat-Nicolas-Ignace d'Amman =

Swiss Catholic cleric (1701–1770)

- Apostolic Administrator of the Diocese of Lausanne
- Church: Catholic Church
- Diocese: Diocese of Lausanne
- In office: 1758–1770
- Previous posts: Canon of Saint-Nicolas (1724–1770); Secretary of the chapter (1725); Provost (1736–1770); Vicar general (1746–1758)

Personal details
- Born: 10 November 1701 Fribourg, Old Swiss Confederacy
- Died: 11 November 1770 (aged 69) Fribourg
- Buried: Saint-Nicolas Cathedral, Fribourg
- Denomination: Roman Catholic
- Parents: Charles d'Amman; Marie-Françoise Fégely
- Education: Collège Saint-Michel; University of Vienna

Béat-Nicolas-Ignace d'Amman (10 November 1701 – 11 November 1770) was a Swiss Catholic cleric who served as apostolic administrator of the Diocese of Lausanne from 1758 until his death in 1770.

== Early life and education ==
Béat-Nicolas-Ignace d'Amman was born on 10 November 1701 in Fribourg, the son of Charles d'Amman, a senator, and Marie-Françoise Fégely. He studied at the Collège Saint-Michel in Fribourg, followed by studies in philosophy and theology at the University of Vienna. He belonged to the d'Amman patrician family.

== Ecclesiastical career ==
D'Amman was elected canon of Saint-Nicolas Cathedral in 1724 and became secretary of the chapter in 1725. He was elected provost in 1736, a position he held alongside his later appointments. From 1746 to 1758, he served as vicar general. In 1758, he was appointed apostolic administrator of the Diocese of Lausanne, a role he occupied until his death.

During his tenure as apostolic administrator, d'Amman played a significant role in resolving a jurisdictional conflict between the chapter of Saint-Nicolas and Bishop Joseph-Nicolas de Montenach. The dispute centered on the chapter's right to invest parish priests in parishes under the authority of Saint-Nicolas, which the bishop contested. In 1763, d'Amman accepted new statutes for the chapter, bringing the conflict to a close.

== Death ==
Béat-Nicolas-Ignace d'Amman died on 11 November 1770 and was buried in the Saint-Nicolas Cathedral in Fribourg.
