= Rossens, Vaud =

Rossens
- Former municipality
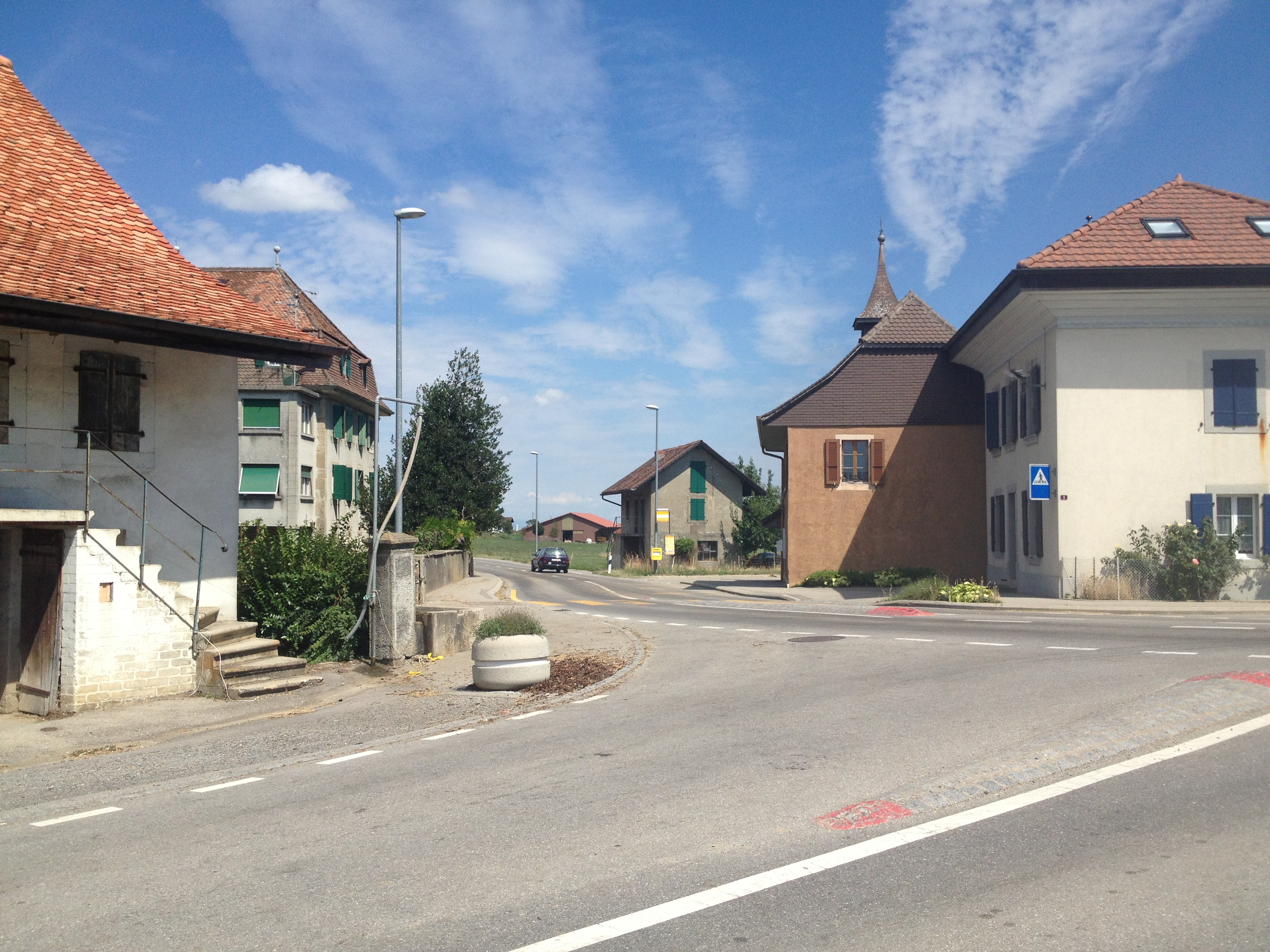

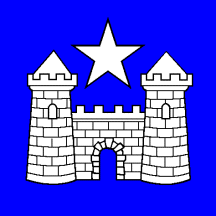
- Flag
- Location of Rossens
- Location within Switzerland Location within Canton of Vaud
- Coordinates: 46°44′N 6°56′E
- Country: Switzerland
- Canton: Vaud
- District: Broye-Vully

Area
  - Total: 1.13 km^{2} (0.44 sq mi)
- Elevation: 721 m (2,365 ft)

Population (2003)
  - Total: 46
  - Density: 41/km^{2} (110/sq mi)
- Time zone: UTC+01:00 (CET)
  - Summer (DST): UTC+02:00 (CEST)
- Postal code: 1554
- SFOS number: 5823
- ISO 3166 code: CH-VD
- Website: Profile (in French), SFSO statistics

Rossens is a village in the Broye-Vully District in the canton of Vaud in Switzerland. Formerly an independent municipality, it lost that status on 1 July 2006 when, together with Sédeilles, it was merged into Villarzel.
