= D'Amman family =

Patrician family from Fribourg

d'Amman Gaudion, Godion, Mestral, Mestraul
- Patrician
- Country: Switzerland
- Origin: Neyruz
- Founded: 14th century
- Estates: Ependes, Macconnens, Vuissens, others

The d'Amman family is a patrician family originally from Neyruz in the Canton of Fribourg. The family has been documented as bourgeois of Fribourg since 1343 under the names Gaudion, Godion, or Mestra(u)l, with the Germanized form appearing at the beginning of the 16th century.

== History ==
The family was represented in the Grand Council and gained entry to the Secret Chamber and the Small Council in the 15th century, where it remained until the end of the 18th century. Its social ascent is reflected in its matrimonial policy. Through inheritance or purchase, the family acquired lordships or co-lordships of Vuissens (1541-1566) and Démoret (1541-1596), Saint-Barthélemy and Goumoens-le-Châtel (1652/1653-1718 and 1794-1803), Ependes (with its castle, 1661-1972), and Macconnens (1673-1840). The family produced bailiffs as well as officers in the service of France.

== Notable members ==
- Nicod Mestraul is mentioned as a bourgeois of Fribourg in 1442. His son Jean Mestraul was banneret of the Bourg and chief of the Fribourg artillery at the Battle of Morat.
- Jean (died 1523), son of the preceding, took the name d'Amman, commanded the Fribourg contingent during the Italian campaign, and was wounded in the service of France at La Bicoque (1522).
- Petermann Amman, son of Jean, obtained a letter of arms from Charles V in 1541.
- Jean (1607-1682), bailli of Rue, purchased Saint-Barthélemy and Goumoens.
- Nicolas (1624-1708) acquired Macconnens, which remained in the hands of the family until the extinction of seigneurial rights.
- Béat-Nicolas-Ignace d'Amman, provost of Saint-Nicolas, and his brother François-Pierre-Joseph, a Jesuit, embraced ecclesiastical careers.
- François-Nicolas-Alois-Jean (1781-1853) was master of the Mint of Fribourg from 1808 to 1847. His brother Jean-Baptiste (1788-1865) settled around 1830 in Poland (this branch is extinct).
- François-Nicolas-Alois-Bonaventure (1800-1853), Fribourg delegate to the last Federal Diet, was expelled from Fribourg as an instigator of the Sonderbund by the radical government. After him, the family no longer produced leading politicians but counted representatives of the liberal professions.
