= La Folliaz =

- Former municipality
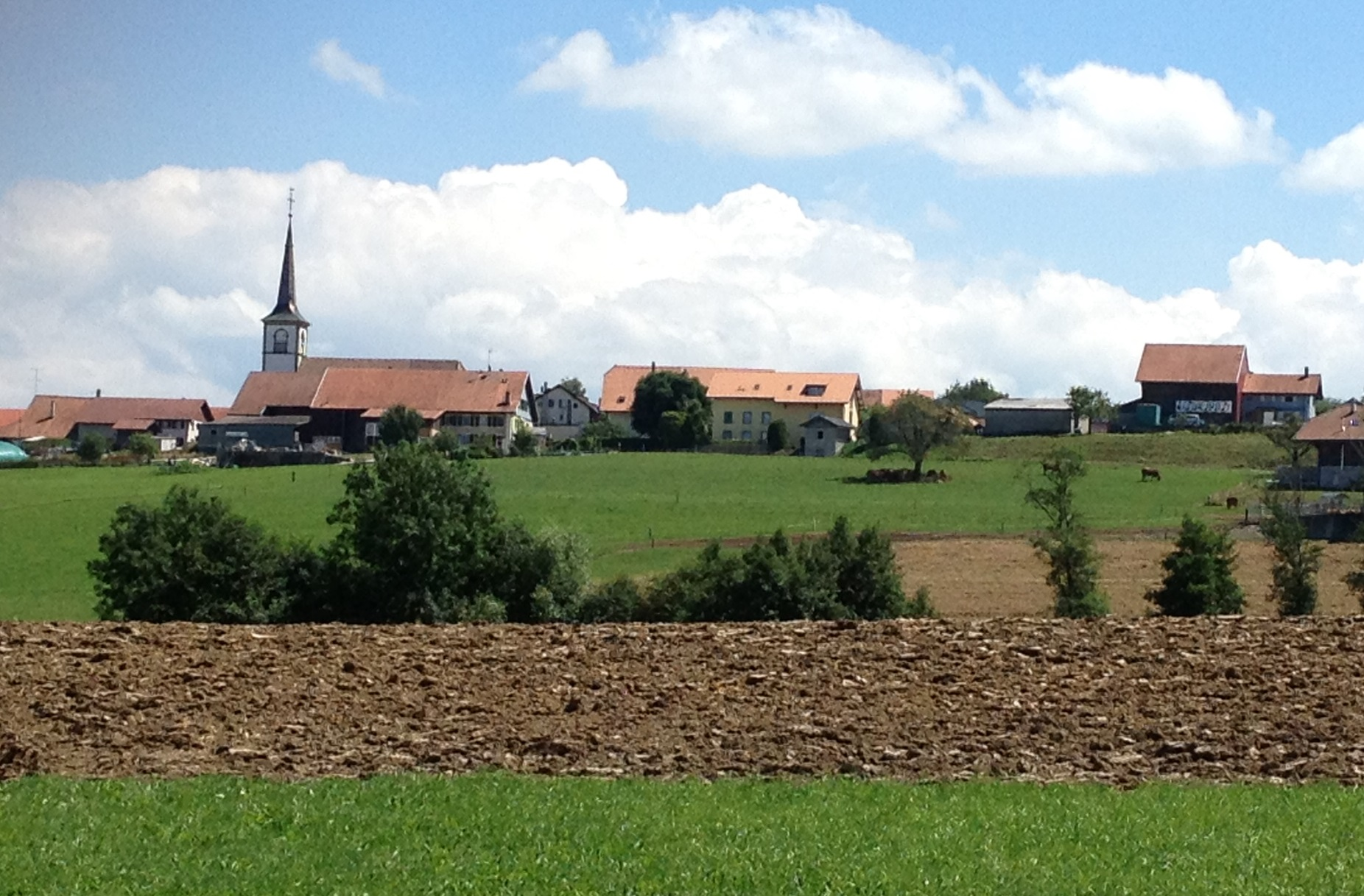
- Villarimboud

- Coat of arms
- Location of La Folliaz
- Location within Switzerland Location within Canton of Fribourg
- Coordinates: 46°44′N 6°58′E
- Country: Switzerland
- Canton: Fribourg
- District: Glâne

Government
  - Mayor: Syndic

Area
  - Total: 9.91 km^{2} (3.83 sq mi)
- Elevation: 756 m (2,480 ft)

Population (December 2020)
  - Total: 988
  - Density: 99.7/km^{2} (258/sq mi)
- Time zone: UTC+01:00 (CET)
  - Summer (DST): UTC+02:00 (CEST)
- Postal codes: 1690 Lussy; 1691 Villarimboud
- SFOS number: 2116
- ISO 3166 code: CH-FR
- Surrounded by: Châtonnaye, Chénens, La Brillaz, Romont, Sédeilles (VD), Torny, Villaz-Saint-Pierre, Villorsonnens
- Website: www.lafolliaz.ch

La Folliaz (Arpitan: La Folyê) is a former municipality in the district of Glâne in the canton of Fribourg in Switzerland. It was formed on January 1, 2005, from the union of the former municipalities of Lussy and Villarimboud. On 1 January 2020 the former municipalities La Folliaz and Villaz-Saint-Pierre merged to form the new municipality of Villaz.

== History ==
Lussy is first mentioned in the 12th century as Lussiei.

== Geography ==
La Folliaz has an area, as of 2009, of 9.9 square kilometers (3.8 mi^{2}). Of this area, 7.4 km^{2} (2.9 mi^{2}) or 75.1% is used for agricultural purposes, while 1.84 km^{2} (0.71 mi^{2}) or 18.7% is forested. Of the rest of the land, 0.63 km^{2} (0.24 mi^{2}) or 6.4% is settled (buildings or roads), 0.02 km^{2} (4.9 acres) or 0.2% is either rivers or lakes and 0.01 km^{2} (2.5 acres) or 0.1% is unproductive land.

Of the built up area, housing and buildings made up 4.1% and transportation infrastructure made up 1.8%. Out of the forested land, all of the forested land area is covered with heavy forests. Of the agricultural land, 45.5% is used for growing crops and 28.2% is pastures, while 1.3% is used for orchards or vine crops. All the water in the municipality is flowing water.

It consists of the linear village of Lussy, the village of Villarimboud and scattered farm houses.

== Demographics ==
La Folliaz has a population (as of December 2020) of 988. As of 2008, 3.5% of the population are resident foreign nationals. Over the last 10 years (2000–2010) the population has changed at a rate of 2.9%. Migration accounted for -1.3%, while births and deaths accounted for 2.4%.

Most of the population (as of 2000) speaks French (96.5%) as their first language, German is the second most common (2.2%) and English is the third (0.5%).

As of 2008, the population was 50.6% male and 49.4% female. The population was made up of 417 Swiss men (48.9% of the population) and 15 (1.8%) non-Swiss men. There were 406 Swiss women (47.6%) and 15 (1.8%) non-Swiss women.

The age distribution, as of 2000, in La Folliaz is; 123 children or 14.9% of the population are between 0 and 9 years old and 145 teenagers or 17.5% are between 10 and 19. Of the adult population, 90 people or 10.9% of the population are between 20 and 29 years old. 132 people or 16.0% are between 30 and 39, 140 people or 16.9% are between 40 and 49, and 86 people or 10.4% are between 50 and 59. The senior population distribution is 42 people or 5.1% of the population are between 60 and 69 years old, 45 people or 5.4% are between 70 and 79, there are 23 people or 2.8% who are between 80 and 89, and there is 1 person who is 90 and older.

As of 2009, the construction rate of new housing units was 3.5 new units per 1000 residents.

== Politics ==
In the 2011 federal election the most popular party was the SVP which received 25.6% of the vote. The next three most popular parties were the SP (22.9%), the CVP (21.1%) and the FDP (13.2%).

The SVP received about the same percentage of the vote as they did in the 2007 Federal election (25.4% in 2007 vs 25.6% in 2011). The SPS moved from third in 2007 (with 19.3%) to second in 2011, the CVP moved from second in 2007 (with 24.8%) to third and the FDP retained about the same popularity (16.8% in 2007). A total of 315 votes were cast in this election, of which 3 or 1.0% were invalid.

== Economy ==
As of 2010, La Folliaz had an unemployment rate of 2.3%. As of 2008, there were 109 people employed in the primary economic sector and about 35 businesses involved in this sector. 22 people were employed in the secondary sector and there were 4 businesses in this sector. 66 people were employed in the tertiary sector, with 16 businesses in this sector. There were residents of the municipality who were employed in some capacity.

In 2008 the total number of full-time equivalent jobs was 170. The number of jobs in the primary sector was 88, all of which were in agriculture. The number of jobs in the secondary sector was 21 of which 9 or (42.9%) were in manufacturing and 12 (57.1%) were in construction. The number of jobs in the tertiary sector was 61. In the tertiary sector; 10 or 16.4% were in wholesale or retail sales or the repair of motor vehicles, 2 or 3.3% were in the movement and storage of goods, 2 or 3.3% were in the information industry, 1 was the insurance or financial industry, 4 or 6.6% were technical professionals or scientists, 7 or 11.5% were in education and 1 was in health care.

Of the working population, 6.8% used public transportation to get to work, and 68.2% used a private car.

== Education ==
The Canton of Fribourg school system provides one year of non-obligatory Kindergarten, followed by six years of Primary school. This is followed by three years of obligatory lower Secondary school where the students are separated according to ability and aptitude. Following the lower Secondary students may attend a three or four year optional upper Secondary school. The upper Secondary school is divided into gymnasium (university preparatory) and vocational programs. After they finish the upper Secondary program, students may choose to attend a Tertiary school or continue their apprenticeship.

During the 2010–11 school year, there were a total of 99 students attending 5 classes in La Folliaz. A total of 166 students from the municipality attended any school, either in the municipality or outside of it. There were 2 kindergarten classes with a total of 45 students in the municipality. The municipality had 3 primary classes and 54 students. During the same year, there were no lower secondary classes in the municipality, but 36 students attended lower secondary school in a neighboring municipality. There were no upper Secondary classes or vocational classes, but there were 29 upper Secondary students and 20 upper Secondary vocational students who attended classes in another municipality. The municipality had no non-university Tertiary classes, but there were 2 specialized Tertiary students who attended classes in another municipality.
