= Petermann Amman =

16th-century Swiss magistrate

Avoyer of Fribourg
- In office 1540–1562

Burgomaster of Fribourg
- In office 1534–1537

Personal details
- Born: c. 1506 Fribourg, Old Swiss Confederacy
- Died: 8 April 1567 Fribourg
- Spouses: Isabelle Gruyère; Marguerite Alex
- Parent(s): Hans Gaudion alias Mestraul; Agnès (Anne) Musard

Petermann Amman (also Ammann; c. 1506 – 8 April 1567) was a Swiss magistrate who served as Avoyer of Fribourg on multiple occasions between 1540 and 1562. He was the first member of his family to use the name Amman exclusively.

== Biography ==
Petermann Amman was born around 1506, the son of Hans Gaudion alias Mestraul and Agnès (Anne) Musard. He married twice: first to Isabelle Gruyère, granddaughter of Guillaume, the chancellor, and second to Marguerite Alex, daughter of Antoine.

Amman served as clerk of the court before beginning his political career. He was a member of the Council of Two Hundred (1526–1529), the Council of Sixty (1530–1531), and the Small Council (1531–1540). He served as Burgomaster from 1534 to 1537, and was elected Avoyer on several occasions between 1540 and 1562. He also served as Bailiff of Planfayon during two terms: 1543–1546 and 1549–1552.

In 1541, Amman received letters of nobility from Charles V, Holy Roman Emperor. That same year, he became lord of Vuissens (which he sold in 1566) and co-lord of Démoret. He was sent twice to Henry II of France to defend the financial interests of Count Michel de Gruyère, whose bankruptcy resulted in financial losses for Amman.
