= Torny =

- Municipality
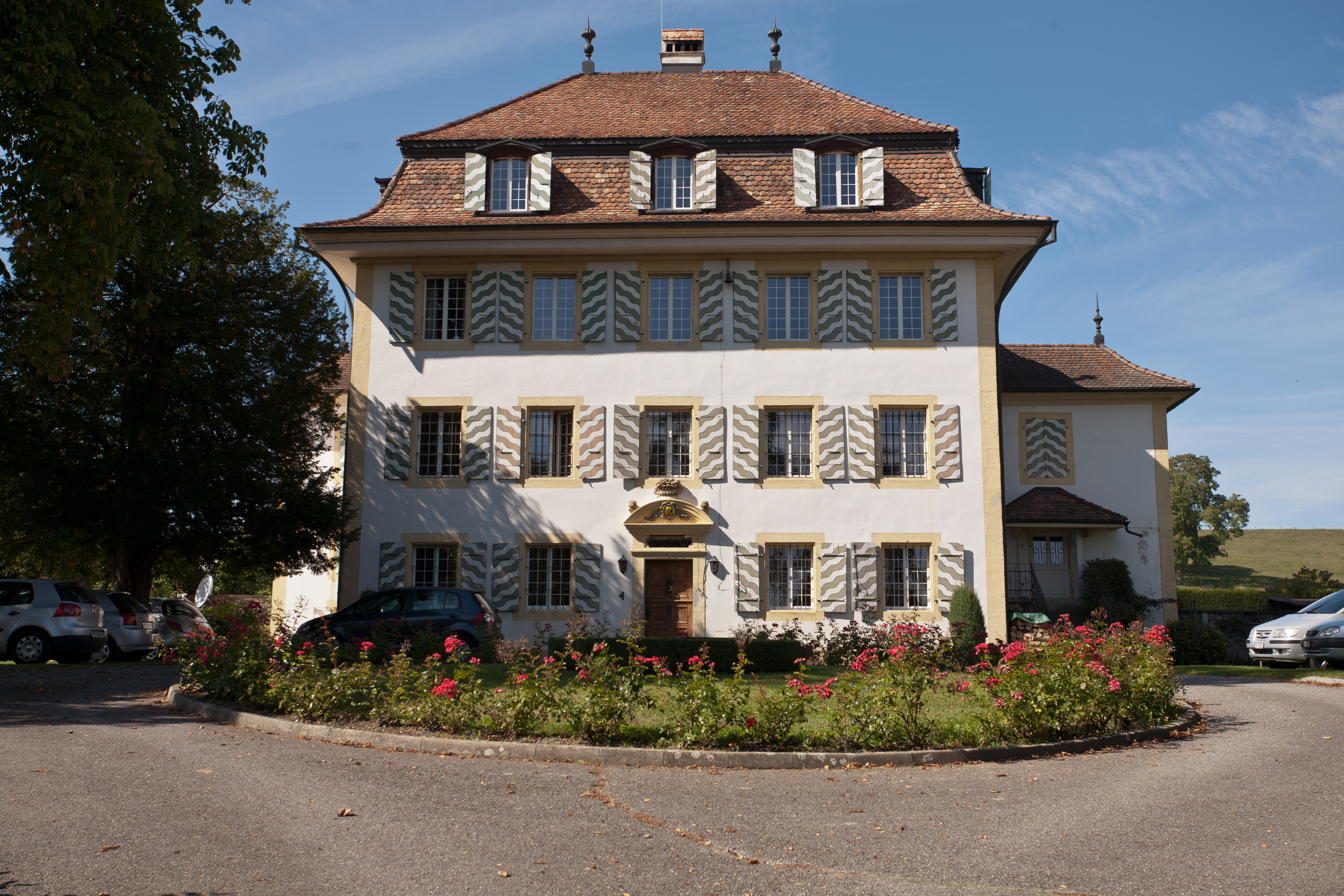
- De Diesbach Castle in Torny village

- Coat of arms
- Location of Torny
- Location within Switzerland Location within Canton of Fribourg
- Coordinates: 46°46′N 6°58′E
- Country: Switzerland
- Canton: Fribourg
- District: Glâne

Government
  - Mayor: Syndic

Area
  - Total: 10.20 km^{2} (3.94 sq mi)
- Elevation: 675 m (2,215 ft)

Population (December 2020)
  - Total: 988
  - Density: 96.9/km^{2} (251/sq mi)
- Time zone: UTC+01:00 (CET)
  - Summer (DST): UTC+02:00 (CEST)
- Postal code: 1748
- SFOS number: 2115
- ISO 3166 code: CH-FR
- Surrounded by: Châtonnaye, Corserey, La Brillaz, La Folliaz, Montagny, Payerne (VD), Trey (VD)
- Website: www.torny.ch

Torny (French: [tɔʁni]; Arpitan: Torni) is a municipality in the district of Glâne in the canton of Fribourg in Switzerland. It was created in 2004 through the merger of Middes and Torny-le-Grand.

== Geography ==
Torny has an area, as of 2009, of 10.2 square kilometers (3.9 mi^{2}). Of this area, 7.02 km^{2} (2.71 mi^{2}) or 69.0% is used for agricultural purposes, while 2.57 km^{2} (0.99 mi^{2}) or 25.2% is forested. Of the rest of the land, 0.59 km^{2} (0.23 mi^{2}) or 5.8% is settled (buildings or roads), 0.01 km^{2} (2.5 acres) or 0.1% is either rivers or lakes.

Of the built up area, housing and buildings made up 3.7% and transportation infrastructure made up 1.8%. Out of the forested land, all of the forested land area is covered with heavy forests. Of the agricultural land, 45.3% is used for growing crops and 22.6% is pastures, while 1.1% is used for orchards or vine crops. All the water in the municipality is flowing water.

== Demographics ==
Torny has a population (as of December 2020) of 988. As of 2008, 6.9% of the population are resident foreign nationals. Over the last 10 years (2000–2010) the population has changed at a rate of 12.2%. Migration accounted for 9.5%, while births and deaths accounted for 5.6%.

Most of the population (as of 2000) speaks French (93.6%) as their first language, German is the second most common (4.7%) and Italian is the third (0.5%).

As of 2008, the population was 50.1% male and 49.9% female. The population was made up of 364 Swiss men (46.9% of the population) and 25 (3.2%) non-Swiss men. There were 369 Swiss women (47.6%) and 18 (2.3%) non-Swiss women.

As of 2000, children and teenagers (0–19 years old) make up 25.7% of the population, while adults (20–64 years old) make up 60.7% and seniors (over 64 years old) make up 13.6%.

As of 2009, the construction rate of new housing units was 12.8 new units per 1000 residents. The vacancy rate for the municipality, in 2010, was 0.31%.

== Heritage sites of national significance ==
De Diesbach Castle and Griset de Forel Castle with its park are listed as Swiss heritage site of national significance. The entire hamlet of Torny-le-Petit is part of the Inventory of Swiss Heritage Sites.

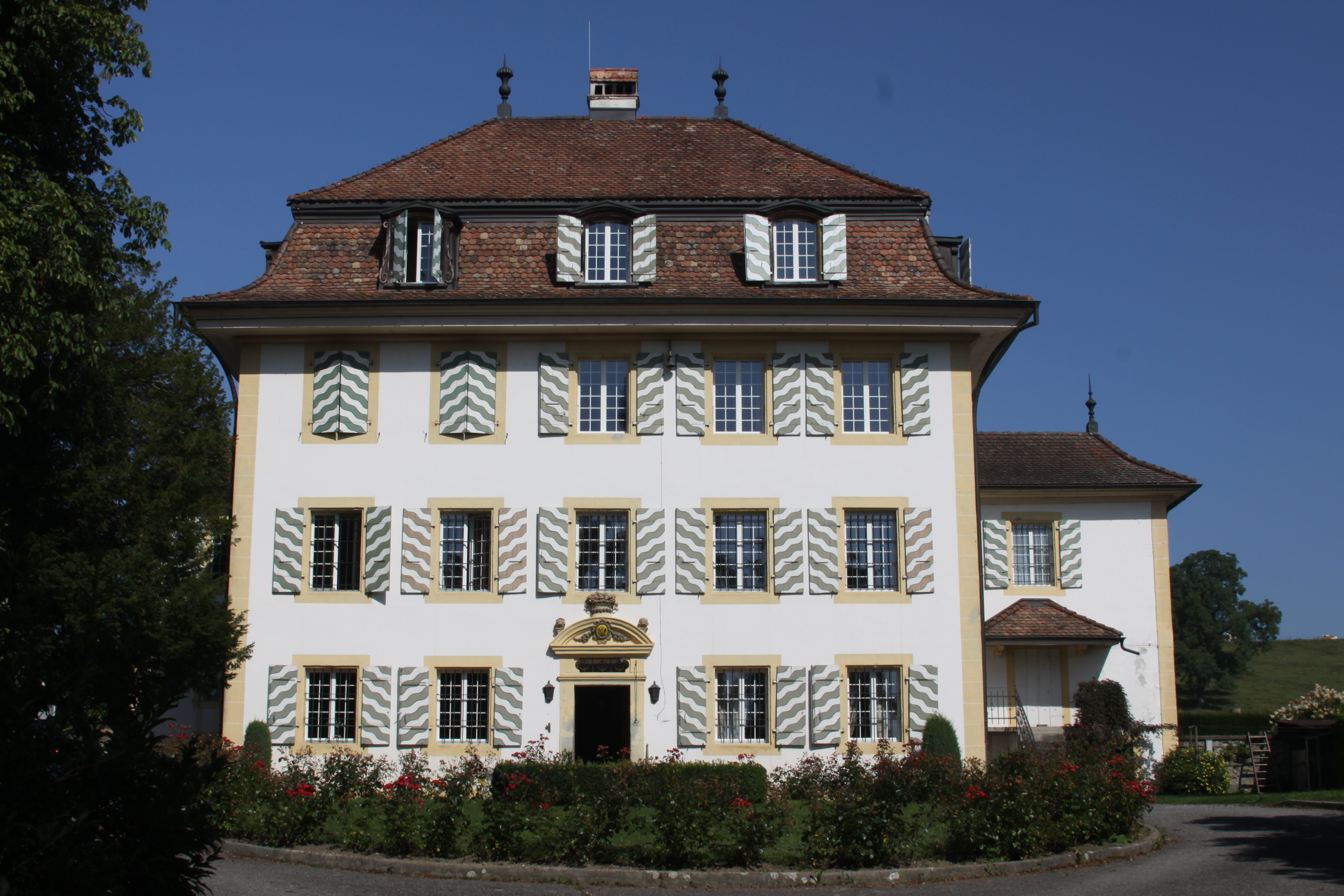
De Diesbach Castle

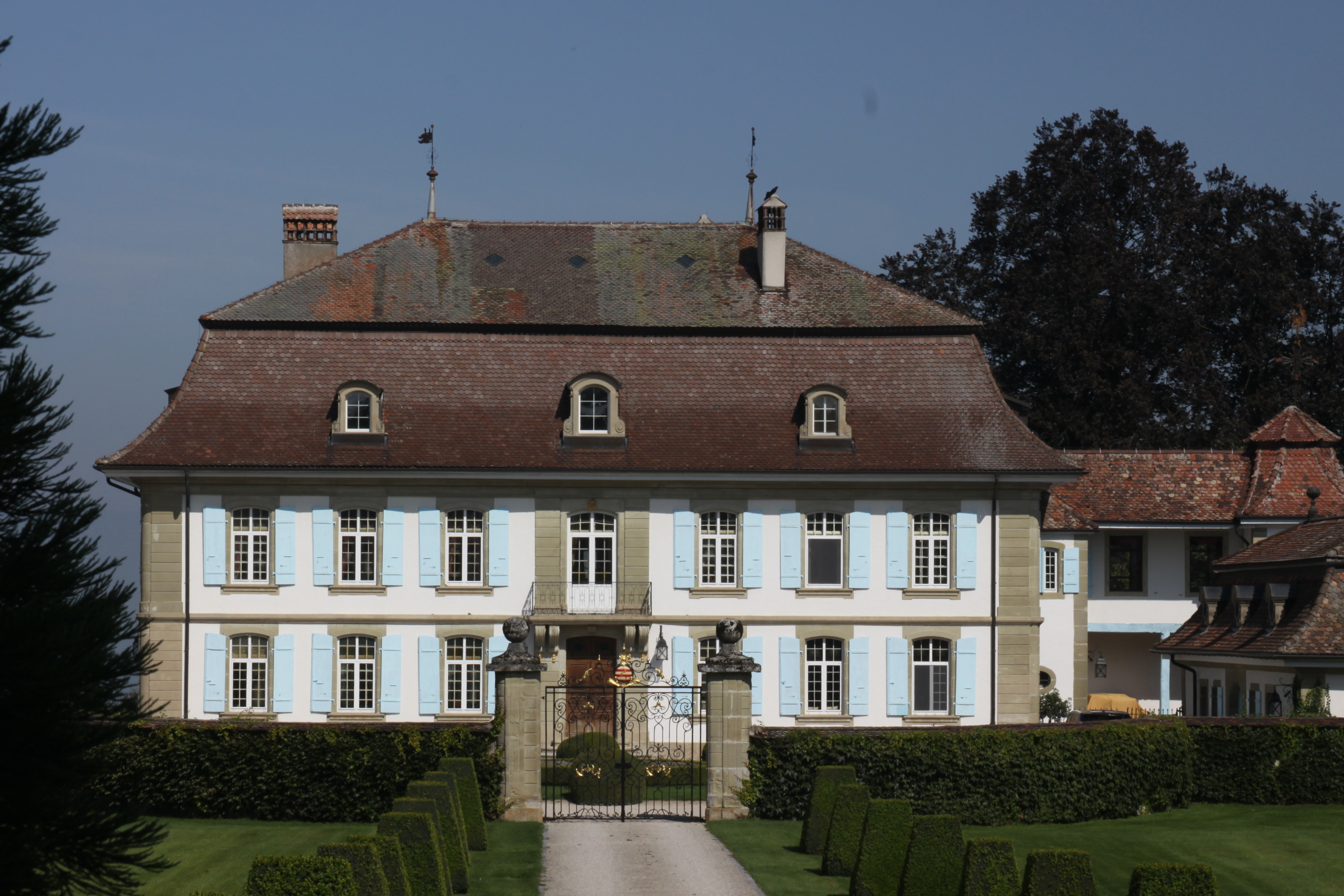
Griset de Forel Castle
with park

== Politics ==
In the 2011 federal election the most popular party was the SVP which received 25.0% of the vote. The next three most popular parties were the SP (22.2%), the CVP (21.0%) and the FDP (16.1%).

The SVP improved their position in Torny, rising to first, from second in 2007 (with 23.1%) The SPS moved from third in 2007 (with 17.5%) to second in 2011, the CVP moved from first in 2007 (with 39.3%) to third and the FDP retained about the same popularity (11.3% in 2007). A total of 308 votes were cast in this election, of which 7 or 2.3% were invalid.

== Economy ==
As of 2010, Torny had an unemployment rate of 2.8%. As of 2008, there were 73 people employed in the primary economic sector and about 22 businesses involved in this sector. 23 people were employed in the secondary sector and there were 8 businesses in this sector. 26 people were employed in the tertiary sector, with 12 businesses in this sector.

In 2008 the total number of full-time equivalent jobs was 95. The number of jobs in the primary sector was 53, all of which were in agriculture. The number of jobs in the secondary sector was 21 of which 17 or (81.0%) were in manufacturing and 4 (19.0%) were in construction. The number of jobs in the tertiary sector was 21. In the tertiary sector; 8 or 38.1% were in wholesale or retail sales or the repair of motor vehicles, 3 or 14.3% were in a hotel or restaurant, 1 was in the information industry, 1 was a technical professional or scientist, 5 or 23.8% were in education.

Of the working population, 5.5% used public transportation to get to work, and 69.5% used a private car.

== Education ==
The Canton of Fribourg school system provides one year of non-obligatory Kindergarten, followed by six years of Primary school. This is followed by three years of obligatory lower Secondary school where the students are separated according to ability and aptitude. Following the lower Secondary students may attend a three or four year optional upper Secondary school. The upper Secondary school is divided into gymnasium (university preparatory) and vocational programs. After they finish the upper Secondary program, students may choose to attend a Tertiary school or continue their apprenticeship.

During the 2010-11 school year, there were a total of 101 students attending 5 classes in Torny. A total of 113 students from the municipality attended any school, either in the municipality or outside of it. There was one kindergarten class with a total of 21 students in the municipality. The municipality had 4 primary classes and 80 students. During the same year, there were no lower secondary classes in the municipality, but 27 students attended lower secondary school in a neighboring municipality. There were no upper Secondary classes or vocational classes, but there were 3 upper Secondary students and 14 upper Secondary vocational students who attended classes in another municipality. The municipality had no non-university Tertiary classes, but there were 3 non-university Tertiary students and one specialized Tertiary student who attended classes in another municipality.
