= Musard family =

Noble family of Estavayer-le-Lac

The Musard family was a family of Estavayer-le-Lac, recorded from 1353 to 1549. Described as noble at the beginning of the 16th century, it owned the lordship of Vuissens. Musards of Vevey and La Tour-de-Peilz, whose kinship with the Musards of Estavayer is uncertain, were lords of Villarimboud.

== History ==
The Musards of Estavayer-le-Lac are recorded from 1353 to 1549. They were described as noble at the beginning of the 16th century and owned the lordship of Vuissens. Michel, co-lord of Démoret, was a councillor of Estavayer from 1525 to 1539. The last legitimate male member of the family was Jean (died 1549), a canon of Lausanne and in 1539 provost of the collegiate chapter of St. Nicholas in Fribourg. The Musards were related by marriage to the Faucigny, Corbières, Griset, La Balme, Villarzel and Vevey families.

The Musards of Vevey and La Tour-de-Peilz, whose kinship with those of Estavayer is uncertain, are recorded from the beginning of the 14th century to the end of the 16th century as lords of Villarimboud. They were related by marriage to the Duens, Berchier, Blonay, Curtilles, Challant, Mestral and Preux families.

== Bibliography ==
- J.-Ph. Grangier, Annales d'Estavayer, 1905
- A. d'Amman, "La seigneurie de Vuissens", in Annales fribourgeoises, 11, 1923, 156–168, 215–221, 277–288; 12, 1924, 28–33, 64–69

=== Archives ===
- De Vevey card index (Fichier de Vevey), State Archives of Fribourg
- De Vevey genealogy (Généalogie de Vevey), Cantonal and University Library of Fribourg
