= Villorsonnens =

- Municipality
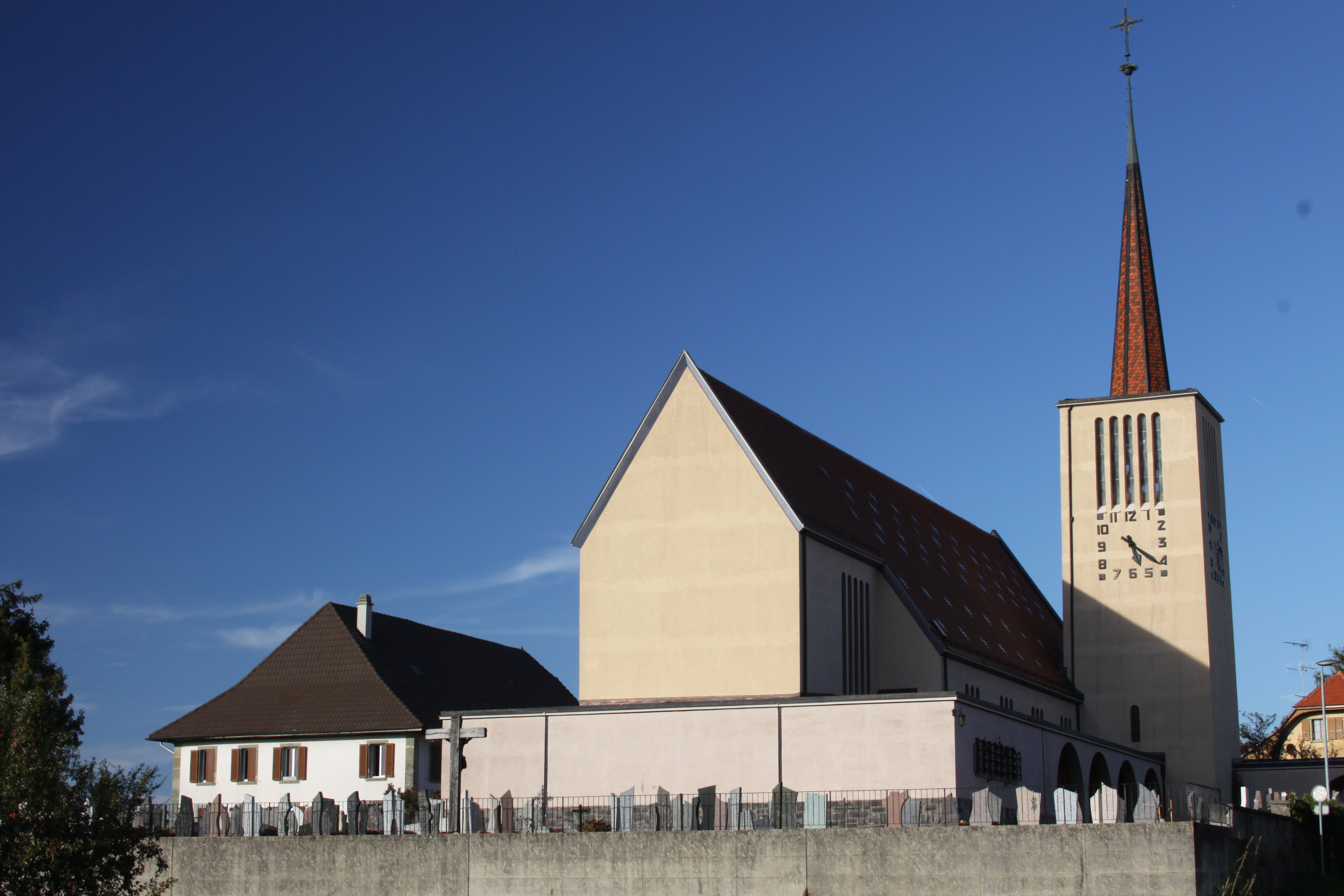
- The Church of Saint-Pierre, a Swiss heritage site of national significance

- Flag Coat of arms
- Location of Villorsonnens
- Location within Switzerland Location within Canton of Fribourg
- Coordinates: 46°43′N 7°0′E
- Country: Switzerland
- Canton: Fribourg
- District: Glâne

Government
  - Mayor: Syndic

Area
  - Total: 15.50 km^{2} (5.98 sq mi)
- Elevation: 699 m (2,293 ft)

Population (December 2020)
  - Total: 1,483
  - Density: 95.68/km^{2} (247.8/sq mi)
- Time zone: UTC+01:00 (CET)
  - Summer (DST): UTC+02:00 (CEST)
- Postal code: 1694
- SFOS number: 2114
- ISO 3166 code: CH-FR
- Surrounded by: Autigny, Chénens, La Folliaz, Le Châtelard, Le Glèbe, Massonnens, Sorens, Villaz-Saint-Pierre
- Website: www.villorsonnens.com

Villorsonnens (French: [vilɔʁsɔnɑ̃s]; Arpitan: Velorsonens, locally Velochounin) is a municipality in the district of Glâne in the canton of Fribourg in Switzerland. The municipality was created around 2001 with the merger of Chavannes-sous-Orsonnens, Orsonnens, Villargiroud and Villarsiviriaux.

== Geography ==
Villorsonnens has an area, as of 2009, of 15.5 square kilometers (6.0 mi^{2}). Of this area, 10.11 km^{2} (3.90 mi^{2}) or 65.4% is used for agricultural purposes, while 4.47 km^{2} (1.73 mi^{2}) or 28.9% is forested. Of the rest of the land, 0.87 km^{2} (0.34 mi^{2}) or 5.6% is settled (buildings or roads), 0.05 km^{2} (12 acres) or 0.3% is either rivers or lakes.

Of the built up area, housing and buildings made up 3.2% and transportation infrastructure made up 1.9%. Out of the forested land, 27.1% of the total land area is heavily forested and 1.8% is covered with orchards or small clusters of trees. Of the agricultural land, 37.6% is used for growing crops and 24.8% is pastures and 2.1% is used for alpine pastures. All the water in the municipality is flowing water.

== Coat of arms ==
The blazon of the municipal coat of arms is Per bend sinister Gules four Mullets of Five Or and Argent. The coat of arms was selected from a public contest that generated three proposals. The four stars represent the four former municipalities.

== Demographics ==
Villorsonnens has a population (as of December 2020) of 1,483. As of 2008, 7.4% of the population are resident foreign nationals. Over the last 10 years (2000–2010) the population has changed at a rate of 13.9%. Migration accounted for 10%, while births and deaths accounted for 4.9%.

Most of the population (as of 2000) speaks French (92.6%) as their first language, German is the second most common (2.7%) and Portuguese is the third (1.7%).

As of 2008, the population was 52.6% male and 47.4% female. The population was made up of 592 Swiss men (47.7% of the population) and 60 (4.8%) non-Swiss men. There were 548 Swiss women (44.2%) and 40 (3.2%) non-Swiss women. As of 2000, children and teenagers (0–19 years old) make up 30% of the population, while adults (20–64 years old) make up 58.2% and seniors (over 64 years old) make up 11.8%.

As of 2009, the construction rate of new housing units was 3.2 new units per 1000 residents. The vacancy rate for the municipality, in 2010, was 0.87%.

== Heritage sites of national significance ==
The Church of Saint-Pierre is listed as Swiss heritage site of national significance. The entire village of Orsonnens is part of the Inventory of Swiss Heritage Sites.

== Politics ==
In the 2011 federal election the most popular party was the SVP which received 35.4% of the vote. The next three most popular parties were the CVP (18.5%), the SP (18.3%) and the FDP (10.2%).

The SVP received about the same percentage of the vote as they did in the 2007 Federal election (37.5% in 2007 vs 35.4% in 2011). The CVP retained about the same popularity (19.4% in 2007), the SPS retained about the same popularity (17.7% in 2007) and the FDP lost popularity (15.5% in 2007). A total of 427 votes were cast in this election, of which 6 or 1.4% were invalid.

== Economy ==
As of 2010, Villorsonnens had an unemployment rate of 2.6%. As of 2008, there were 129 people employed in the primary economic sector and about 49 businesses involved in this sector. 88 people were employed in the secondary sector and there were 11 businesses in this sector. 60 people were employed in the tertiary sector, with 16 businesses in this sector. There were residents of the municipality who were employed in some capacity.

In 2008 the total number of full-time equivalent jobs was 208. The number of jobs in the primary sector was 96, of which 93 were in agriculture and 3 were in forestry or lumber production. The number of jobs in the secondary sector was 68 of which 55 or (80.9%) were in manufacturing and 11 (16.2%) were in construction. The number of jobs in the tertiary sector was 44. In the tertiary sector; 1 was in the sale or repair of motor vehicles, 3 or 6.8% were in the movement and storage of goods, 5 or 11.4% were in a hotel or restaurant, 1 was the insurance or financial industry, 10 or 22.7% were technical professionals or scientists, 7 or 15.9% were in education and 11 or 25.0% were in health care.

Of the working population, 7.4% used public transportation to get to work, and 66.6% used a private car.

== Education ==
The Canton of Fribourg school system provides one year of non-obligatory Kindergarten, followed by six years of Primary school. This is followed by three years of obligatory lower Secondary school where the students are separated according to ability and aptitude. Following the lower Secondary students may attend a three or four year optional upper Secondary school. The upper Secondary school is divided into gymnasium (university preparatory) and vocational programs. After they finish the upper Secondary program, students may choose to attend a Tertiary school or continue their apprenticeship.

During the 2010-11 school year, there were a total of 113 students attending 6 classes in Villorsonnens. A total of 233 students from the municipality attended any school, either in the municipality or outside of it. There was one kindergarten class with a total of 19 students in the municipality. The municipality had 5 primary classes and 94 students. During the same year, there were no lower secondary classes in the municipality, but 53 students attended lower secondary school in a neighboring municipality. There were no upper Secondary classes or vocational classes, but there were 20 upper Secondary students and 39 upper Secondary vocational students who attended classes in another municipality. The municipality had no non-university Tertiary classes, but there was one non-university Tertiary student and 6 specialized Tertiary students who attended classes in another municipality.
