= Chavannes-sous-Orsonnens =

Former municipality, canton of Fribourg

- Former municipality
- Location of Chavannes-sous-Orsonnens
- Location within Switzerland Location within Canton of Fribourg
- Coordinates: 46.733331°N 6.983331°E
- Country: Switzerland
- Canton: Fribourg
- District: Glâne
- Municipality: Villorsonnens

Population (2000)
  - Total: 245
- Time zone: UTC+01:00 (CET)
  - Summer (DST): UTC+02:00 (CEST)
- SFOS number: 2070
- ISO 3166 code: CH-FR
- Website

Chavannes-sous-Orsonnens is a former municipality in the Glâne district of the canton of Fribourg, Switzerland. Since 2001 it has been part of the municipality of Villorsonnens. It lies on the western slope of the Gibloux.

== History ==
Chavannes-sous-Orsonnens comprised several hamlets, among them Granges-la-Battiaz, with which it merged in 1866. It is first mentioned around 1209 as Chavanes. It was a small lordship of the barons of Pont-en-Ogoz. Various fiefs there, held by the Challant (co-lords of Pont-en-Ogoz), by the Reyff and by the monastery of La Fille-Dieu, passed to Fribourg from the end of the 15th century. Until 1798 Chavannes-sous-Orsonnens belonged to the bailiwick of Pont-Farvagny, from 1798 to 1803 to the district of Romont, and from 1803 to 1848 to the arrondissement and district of Farvagny.

Since at least the 14th century Chavannes-sous-Orsonnens has been part of the parish of Orsonnens. The chapel of Saint John the Baptist, dating from the 16th century, was enlarged in 1769.

In 2000 the primary sector (dairy production) provided about two thirds of the jobs. Chavannes-sous-Orsonnens had 186 inhabitants in 1811, 253 in 1850, 206 in 1860, 244 in 1900, 311 in 1941, 286 in 1950, 216 in 1980 and 245 in 2000. In 2001 it became part of the municipality of Villorsonnens.

== Bibliography ==
- A. Dellion, Dictionnaire historique et statistique des paroisses catholiques du canton de Fribourg, 1884–1902, 9, 73
