= Griset de Forel Castle =

Castle in Torny, Switzerland

- Torny
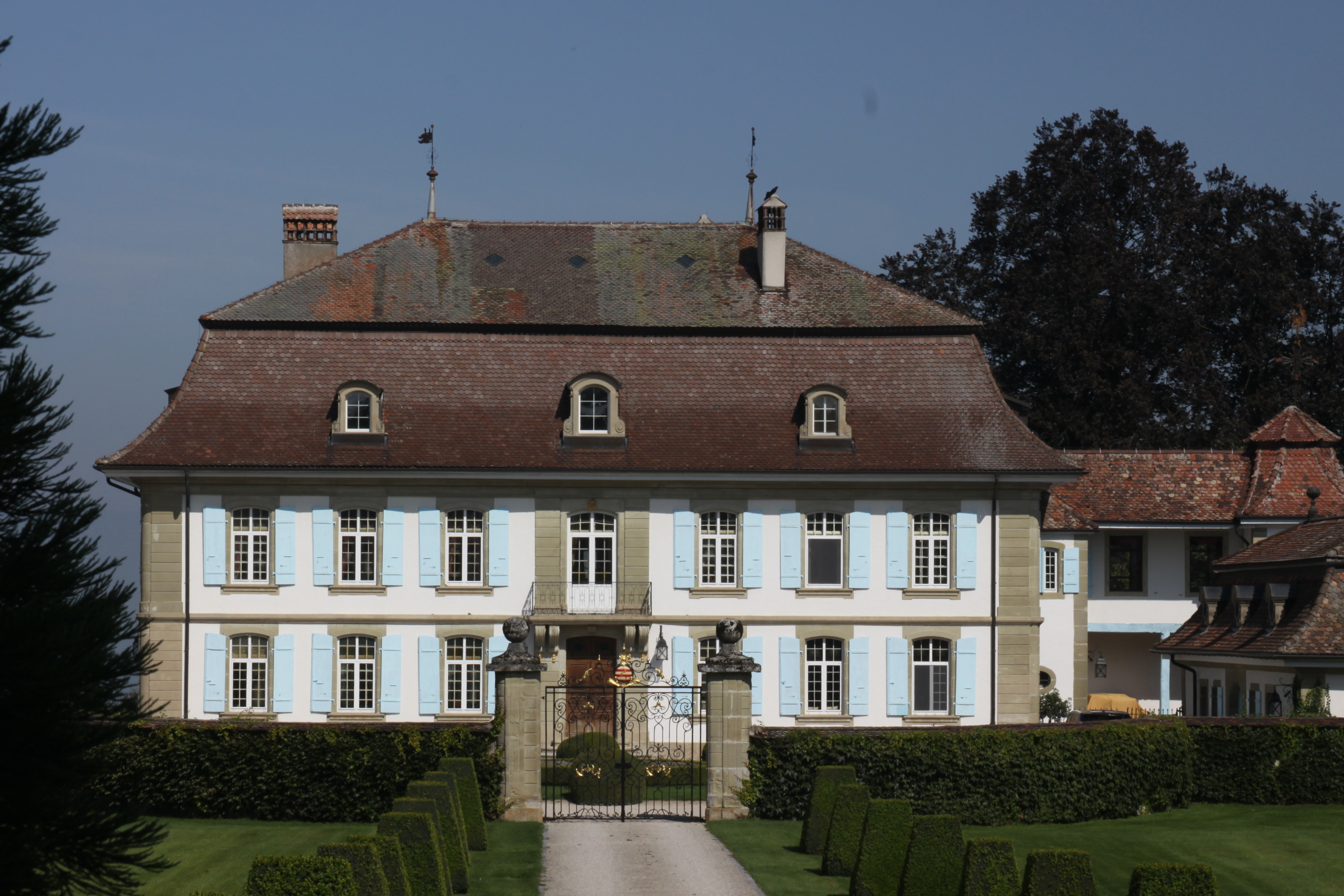
- Griset de Forel Castle

Site information
- Type: Manor house
- Code: CH-FR

Location
- Coordinates: 46°46′06″N 6°56′48″E

Griset de Forel Castle is a castle in the municipality of Torny of the Canton of Fribourg in Switzerland. It is a Swiss heritage site of national significance.

== See also ==
- List of castles in Switzerland
- Château
