= Anna de Diesbach =

Rose breeder (1844-1929)

Anne Marie Lucie Hedwige de Diesbach-Belleroche (born 15 September 1844 in Fribourg Switzerland - d. 10 November 1929 in Beaufort-en-Santerre, France) was a French rosarian.

She was the daughter of count Louis Alexandre Ladislas de Diesbach-Belleroche and of Caroline Constance de Maillardoz de Rue. Her father was chamberlain of the king of Württemberg, commander of the Order of St. Gregory the Great. Her father also was founder and vice president of the "Société Centrale d'Agriculture, d'Horticulture et d'Acclimatation" of Nice. The family also owned the "Villa Diesbach" rosarium, where the rosarian François Lacharme was in charge. Anna de Diesbach was interested in the breeding of roses and in 1859 he named a rose cultivar after her.

On 6 July 1872 Anne married Amédée Marie Ignace Anaclet Cardon de Garsignies (1846–1889) and had three daughters. She died on 10 November 1929 age 85 at her chateau in Beaufort-en-Santerre.
