= De Diesbach Castle =

Castle in Torny, Switzerland

- Torny
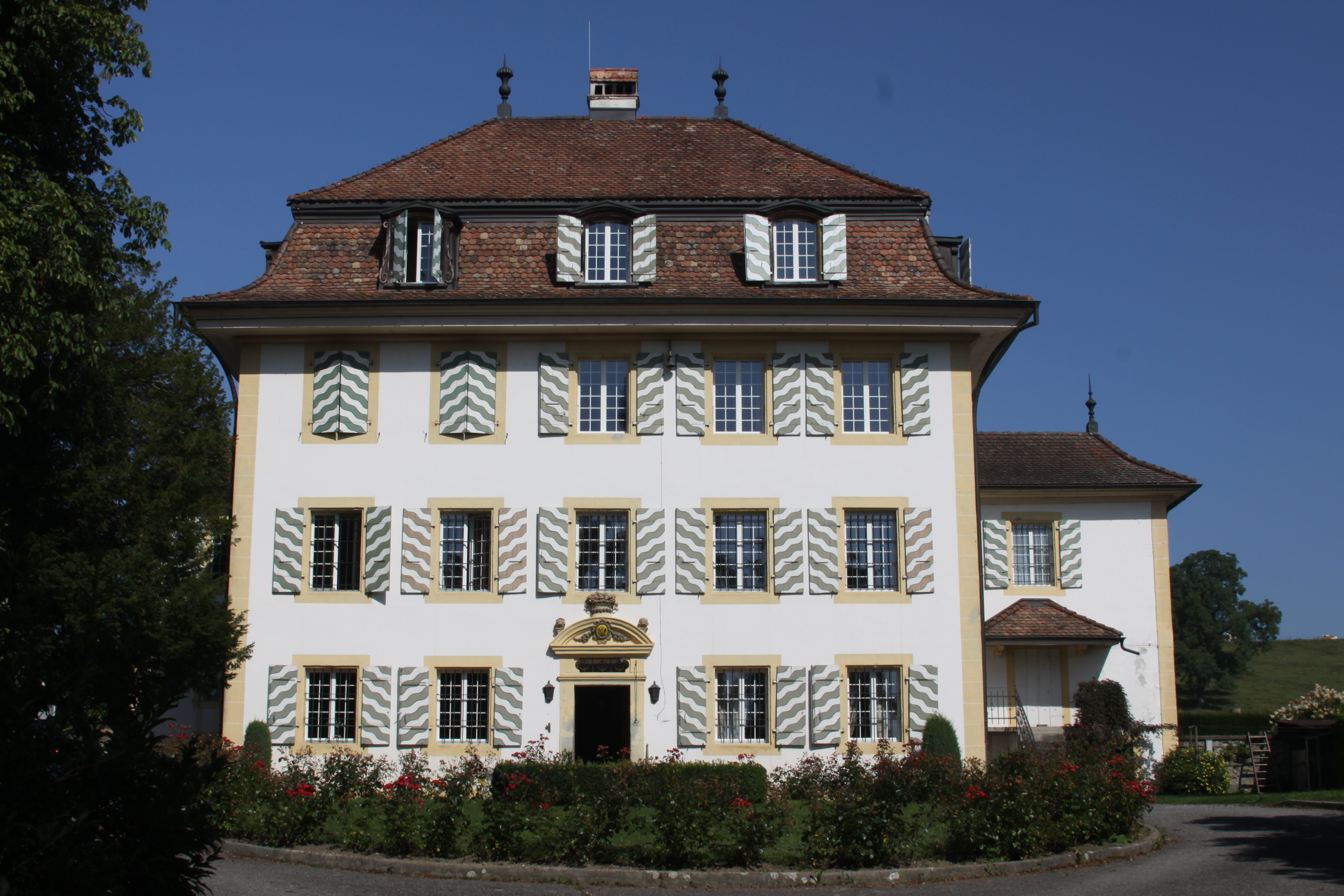
- De Diesbach Castle

Site information
- Type: Manor house
- Code: CH-FR

Location
- Location within Canton of Fribourg Location within Switzerland
- Coordinates: 46°46′20″N 6°57′57″E

De Diesbach Castle is a castle in the municipality of Torny of the Canton of Fribourg in Switzerland. It is a Swiss heritage site of national significance. Between 1730 and 1745 it was built for the de Diesbach family who owned it until 1798. Today it is owned by Archduke Rudolf of Austria (son of Archduke Carl Ludwig).

== See also ==
- List of castles in Switzerland
- Château
