= Châtonnaye =

- Municipality
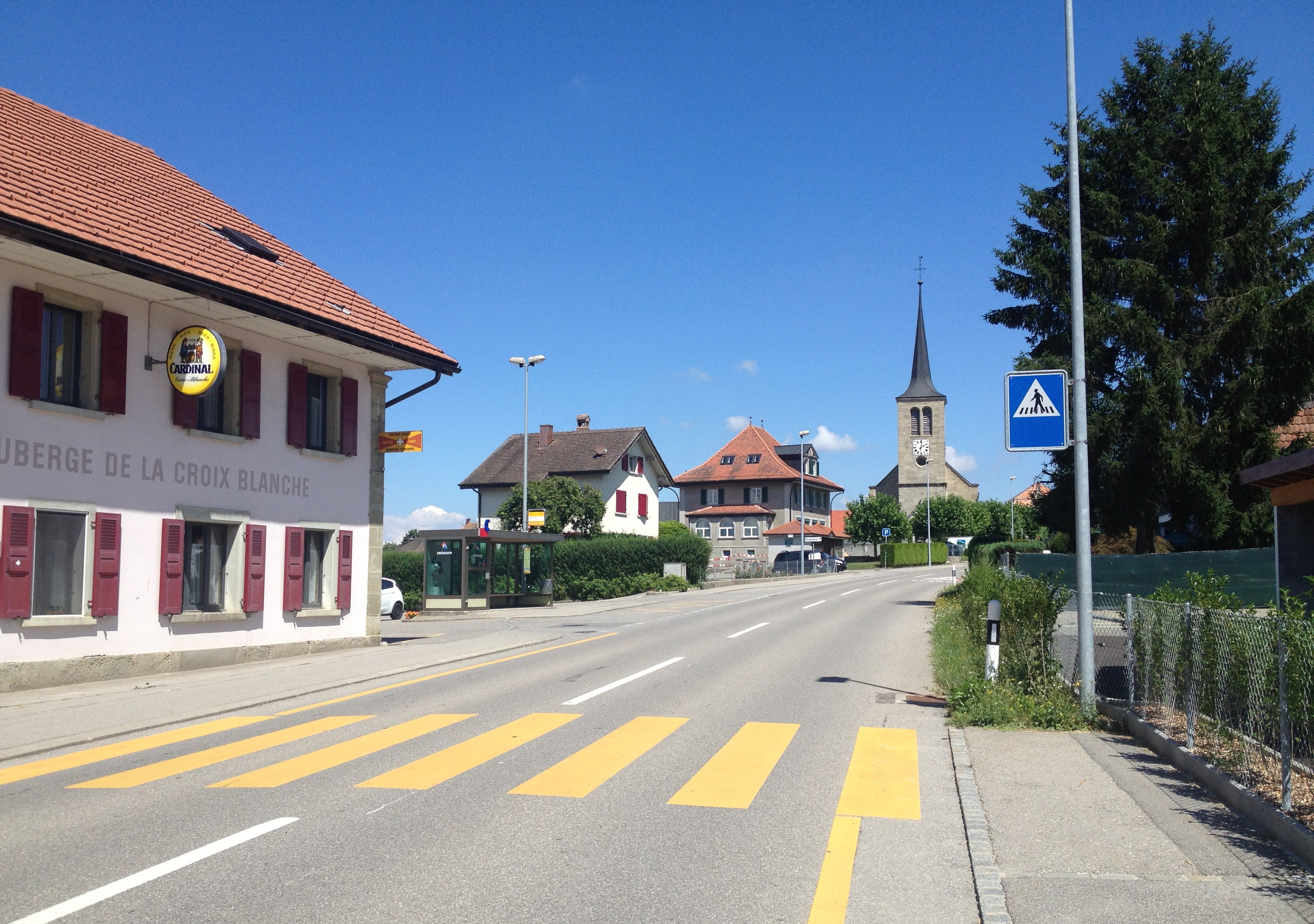

- Flag Coat of arms
- Location of Châtonnaye
- Location within Switzerland Location within Canton of Fribourg
- Coordinates: 46°45′N 6°56′E
- Country: Switzerland
- Canton: Fribourg
- District: Glâne

Government
  - Mayor: Syndic

Area
  - Total: 6.3 km^{2} (2.4 sq mi)
- Elevation: 692 m (2,270 ft)

Population (December 2020)
  - Total: 858
  - Density: 140/km^{2} (350/sq mi)
- Time zone: UTC+01:00 (CET)
  - Summer (DST): UTC+02:00 (CEST)
- Postal code: 1553
- SFOS number: 2068
- ISO 3166 code: CH-FR
- Surrounded by: La Folliaz, Marnand (VD), Sédeilles (VD), Torny, Trey (VD), Villarzel (VD), Villaz-Saint-Pierre
- Website: www.chatonnaye.ch

Châtonnaye (French: [ʃɑtɔnɛ]; Arpitan: Châthonèya or Châthonèna, locally Tsathounêna [tsaθuˈnɛna]) is a municipality in the district of Glâne in the canton of Fribourg in Switzerland.

== History ==
Châtonnaye is first mentioned in 1402 as Chastonaye.

== Geography ==
Châtonnaye has an area, as of 2009, of 6.3 square kilometers (2.4 mi^{2}). Of this area, 4.49 km^{2} (1.73 mi^{2}) or 71.2% is used for agricultural purposes, while 1.46 km^{2} (0.56 mi^{2}) or 23.1% is forested. Of the rest of the land, 0.38 km^{2} (0.15 mi^{2}) or 6.0% is settled (buildings or roads).

Of the built up area, housing and buildings made up 3.6% and transportation infrastructure made up 1.7%. Out of the forested land, 22.0% of the total land area is heavily forested and 1.1% is covered with orchards or small clusters of trees. Of the agricultural land, 48.8% is used for growing crops and 21.2% is pastures, while 1.1% is used for orchards or vine crops.

The municipality is located on the border with the Canton of Vaud.

== Coat of arms ==
The blazon of the municipal coat of arms is Per bend Sable and Argent a Rooster Gules passant bendwise.

== Demographics ==
Châtonnaye has a population (as of December 2020) of 858. As of 2008, 5.8% of the population are resident foreign nationals. Over the last 10 years (2000–2010) the population has changed at a rate of 28.9%. Migration accounted for 24.5%, while births and deaths accounted for 8.2%.

Most of the population (as of 2000) speaks French (485 or 90.0%) as their first language, German is the second most common (47 or 8.7%) and Italian is the third (2 or 0.4%).

As of 2008, the population was 50.4% male and 49.6% female. The population was made up of 324 Swiss men (46.3% of the population) and 29 (4.1%) non-Swiss men. There were 324 Swiss women (46.3%) and 23 (3.3%) non-Swiss women. Of the population in the municipality, 217 or about 40.3% were born in Châtonnaye and lived there in 2000. There were 164 or 30.4% who were born in the same canton, while 117 or 21.7% were born somewhere else in Switzerland, and 35 or 6.5% were born outside of Switzerland.

The age distribution, as of 2000, in Châtonnaye is; 92 children or 17.1% of the population are between 0 and 9 years old and 72 teenagers or 13.4% are between 10 and 19. Of the adult population, 58 people or 10.8% of the population are between 20 and 29 years old. 98 people or 18.2% are between 30 and 39, 73 people or 13.5% are between 40 and 49, and 64 people or 11.9% are between 50 and 59. The senior population distribution is 37 people or 6.9% of the population are between 60 and 69 years old, 28 people or 5.2% are between 70 and 79, there are 14 people or 2.6% who are between 80 and 89, and there are 3 people or 0.6% who are 90 and older.

As of 2000, there were 250 people who were single and never married in the municipality. There were 259 married individuals, 15 widows or widowers and 15 individuals who are divorced.

As of 2000, there were 198 private households in the municipality, and an average of 2.7 persons per household. There were 56 households that consist of only one person and 28 households with five or more people. In 2000, a total of 180 apartments (90.0% of the total) were permanently occupied, while 18 apartments (9.0%) were seasonally occupied and 2 apartments (1.0%) were empty. As of 2009, the construction rate of new housing units was 8.5 new units per 1000 residents. The vacancy rate for the municipality, in 2010, was 2.26%.

The historical population is given in the following chart:

== Politics ==
In the 2011 federal election the most popular party was the SVP which received 28.3% of the vote. The next three most popular parties were the SP (22.2%), the FDP (19.7%) and the CVP (12.1%).

The SVP received about the same percentage of the vote as they did in the 2007 Federal election (29.4% in 2007 vs 28.3% in 2011). The SPS retained about the same popularity (23.2% in 2007), the FDP moved from fourth in 2007 (with 11.0%) to third and the CVP moved from third in 2007 (with 22.0%) to fourth. A total of 270 votes were cast in this election, of which 5 or 1.9% were invalid.

== Economy ==
As of 2010, Châtonnaye had an unemployment rate of 3.1%. As of 2008, there were 39 people employed in the primary economic sector and about 18 businesses involved in this sector. 29 people were employed in the secondary sector and there were 6 businesses in this sector. 42 people were employed in the tertiary sector, with 14 businesses in this sector. There were 247 residents of the municipality who were employed in some capacity, of which females made up 39.3% of the workforce.

In 2008 the total number of full-time equivalent jobs was 86. The number of jobs in the primary sector was 28, all of which were in agriculture. The number of jobs in the secondary sector was 27 of which 19 or (70.4%) were in manufacturing and 9 (33.3%) were in construction. The number of jobs in the tertiary sector was 31. In the tertiary sector; 14 or 45.2% were in wholesale or retail sales or the repair of motor vehicles, 4 or 12.9% were in the movement and storage of goods, 5 or 16.1% were in a hotel or restaurant, 1 was a technical professional or scientist, 6 or 19.4% were in education.

In 2000, there were 30 workers who commuted into the municipality and 170 workers who commuted away. The municipality is a net exporter of workers, with about 5.7 workers leaving the municipality for every one entering. Of the working population, 2.8% used public transportation to get to work, and 74.5% used a private car.

== Religion ==
From the 2000 census, 391 or 72.5% were Roman Catholic, while 82 or 15.2% belonged to the Swiss Reformed Church. Of the rest of the population, there were 14 individuals (or about 2.60% of the population) who belonged to another Christian church. There were 15 (or about 2.78% of the population) who were Islamic. 37 (or about 6.86% of the population) belonged to no church, are agnostic or atheist, and 7 individuals (or about 1.30% of the population) did not answer the question.

== Education ==
In Châtonnaye about 176 or (32.7%) of the population have completed non-mandatory upper secondary education, and 44 or (8.2%) have completed additional higher education (either university or a Fachhochschule). Of the 44 who completed tertiary schooling, 65.9% were Swiss men, 27.3% were Swiss women.

The Canton of Fribourg school system provides one year of non-obligatory Kindergarten, followed by six years of Primary school. This is followed by three years of obligatory lower Secondary school where the students are separated according to ability and aptitude. Following the lower Secondary students may attend a three or four year optional upper Secondary school. The upper Secondary school is divided into gymnasium (university preparatory) and vocational programs. After they finish the upper Secondary program, students may choose to attend a Tertiary school or continue their apprenticeship.

During the 2010–11 school year, there were a total of 47 students attending 3 classes in Châtonnaye. A total of 147 students from the municipality attended any school, either in the municipality or outside of it. There were no kindergarten classes in the municipality, but 11 students attended kindergarten in a neighboring municipality. The municipality had 3 primary classes and 47 students. During the same year, there were no lower secondary classes in the municipality, but 38 students attended lower secondary school in a neighboring municipality. There were no upper Secondary classes or vocational classes, but there were 19 upper Secondary vocational students who attended classes in another municipality. The municipality had no non-university Tertiary classes, but there was one non-university Tertiary student and 4 specialized Tertiary students who attended classes in another municipality.

As of 2000, there were 19 students in Châtonnaye who came from another municipality, while 87 residents attended schools outside the municipality.
