= Diesbach family =

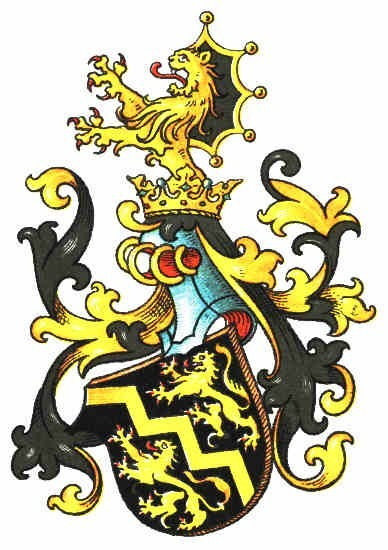
Coat of arms of the Diesbach family

The Diesbach family is a patrician family, originally from the Swiss canton of Bern, with branches in the canton of Fribourg and in France.
