= Le Gibloux =

Mountain in Switzerland

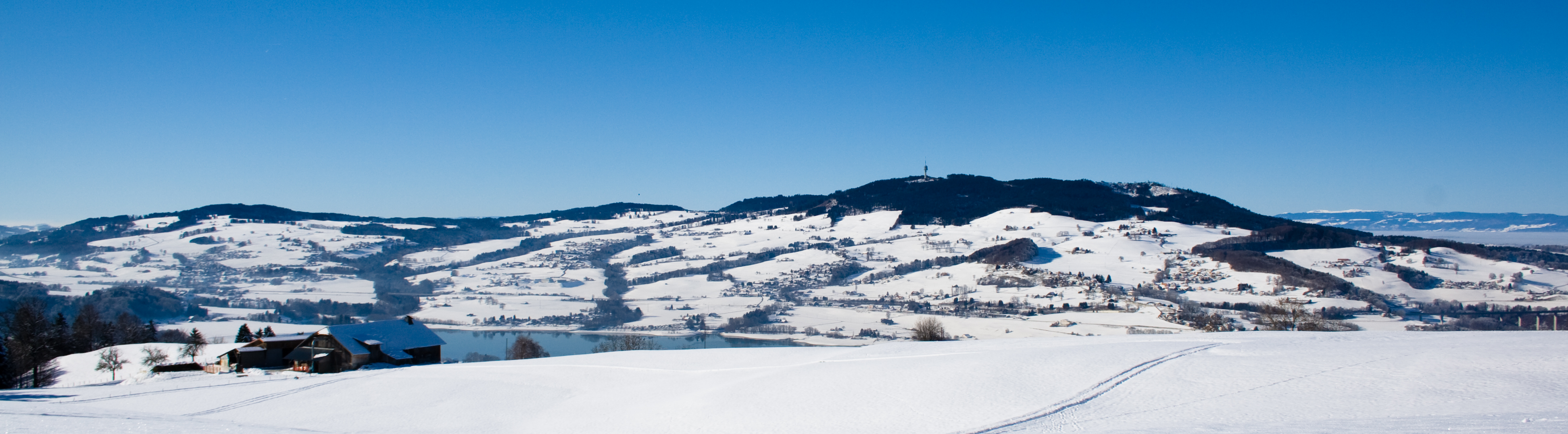
- View from La Berra

Highest point
- Elevation: 1,204 m (3,950 ft)
- Prominence: 374 m (1,227 ft)
- Isolation: 9.02 km (5.60 mi)
- Coordinates: 46°41′3″N 7°2′26″E

Geography
- Location within Switzerland
- Location: Fribourg, Switzerland
- Parent range: Swiss Prealps

Le Gibloux (1,204 m) is a mountain of the Swiss Prealps, overlooking the Lake of Gruyère in the canton of Fribourg.

The Gibloux Radio Tower, operated by Swisscom, is located on the mountain's southern summit, with an accessible public viewing platform, and views stretching in every direction.
