= Sédeilles =

- Former municipality
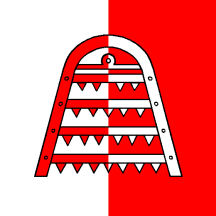
- Flag
- Location of Sédeilles
- Location within Switzerland Location within Canton of Vaud
- Coordinates: 46°45′N 6°56′E
- Country: Switzerland
- Canton: Vaud
- District: Payerne

Area
  - Total: 2.47 km^{2} (0.95 sq mi)
- Elevation: 688 m (2,257 ft)

Population (2003)
  - Total: 147
  - Density: 59.5/km^{2} (154/sq mi)
- Time zone: UTC+01:00 (CET)
  - Summer (DST): UTC+02:00 (CEST)
- Postal code: 1554
- SFOS number: 5825
- ISO 3166 code: CH-VD
- Website: Profile (in French), SFSO statistics

Sédeilles is a village in the Broye-Vully District of the Canton of Vaud, Switzerland. Formerly an independent municipality (in Payerne District), it lost that status on 1 July 2006 when, together with Rossens, it was merged into Villarzel.
