= Le Loyon =

Swiss urban legend

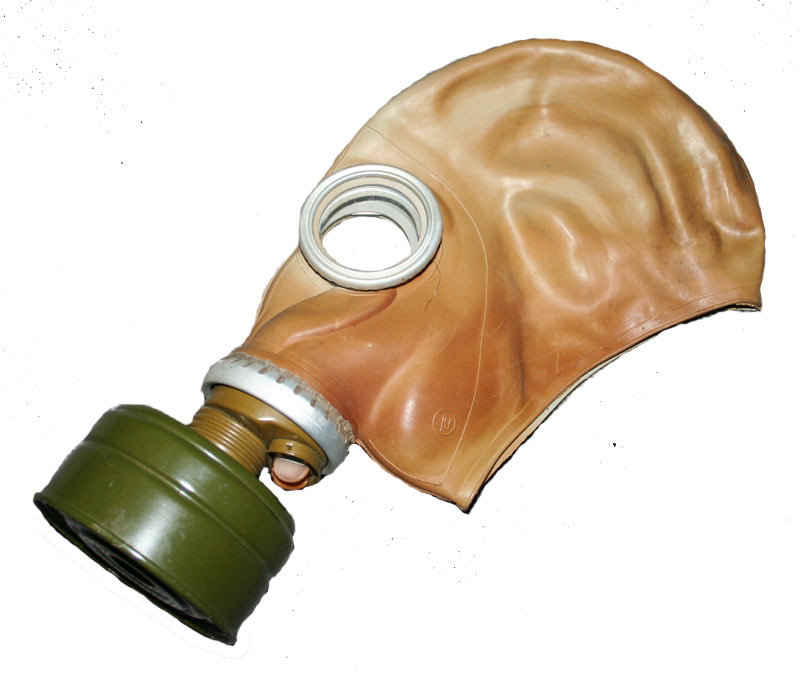
A GP-5 gas mask similar to the one Le Loyon was described to wear

Le Loyon, also known as the Ghost of Maules, is an unidentified person that roamed the forest near the village of Maules in Sâles, Switzerland, resulting in rumors that they were a ghost or cryptid. Le Loyon dressed in a military or camouflage boilersuit, a cloak and a gas mask which covered their entire head. The existence of Le Loyon as a real person was confirmed in 2013 when they were photographed by a journalist, after which they abandoned their outfit and left a note disapproving of their media attention, and sightings stopped.

== Sightings ==
The first sightings of Le Loyon date back to the late 1990s or early 2000s. In one of the reported sightings, a local woman claimed to have seen Le Loyon picking flowers on the trail and was startled to be seen by her. There were several theories concerning Le Loyon's identity. Some claimed that they might be a mentally ill woman, a gigantic man, someone suffering from a skin condition, or a survivalist. In September 2013, a Swiss French-language newspaper Le Matin published the first known photograph of Le Loyon, taken by an unnamed amateur photographer.

After the photo began to circulate online, Le Matin reported that Le Loyon's cloak and gas mask were supposedly found in the Maules Forest, along with a note written by Le Loyon, titled "Death Certificate and Testament of the Ghost of Maules". The note claimed that Le Loyon knew of the viral photograph, and was displeased with the unwanted attention it brought to the forest. Since then, there have been no more reported sightings of Le Loyon in the Maules Forest. One of the theories claim that the figure was an eccentric local who was afraid of being linked to Le Loyon, and abandoned their costumed walks as a result. However, the way the note was worded led some to believe that Le Loyon had died by suicide.

== See also ==
- Raymond Robinson (Green Man), a disfigured nighttime pedestrian once thought an urban legend
