= Romanens =

Former municipality, canton of Fribourg

- Former municipality
- Coat of arms
- Location of Romanens
- Location within Switzerland Location within Canton of Fribourg
- Coordinates: 46.65°N 6.966659°E
- Country: Switzerland
- Canton: Fribourg
- District: Gruyère
- Municipality: Sâles

Population (2000)
  - Total: 256
- Time zone: UTC+01:00 (CET)
  - Summer (DST): UTC+02:00 (CEST)
- ISO 3166 code: CH-FR
- Website

Romanens (old German name Romaning) is a former municipality in the Gruyère district of the canton of Fribourg, Switzerland, on the southern slope of the Gibloux. In 2001 it merged with Maules, Rueyres-Treyfayes and Sâles (Gruyère) to form the municipality of Sâles.

== History ==
Romanens is first mentioned, possibly in 1380, as Romanens. A Burgundian necropolis, with damascened belt-buckle plates, has been found there.

Romanens first belonged to the lordship of Maules. It then passed, as a co-lordship, to Guy de Montagny at the beginning of the 13th century, to Antoine de la Tour, lord of Illens, and from 1387 to the Champion family, castellans of Vaulruz. In 1538 their descendants sold Romanens to Fribourg together with the whole lordship of Vaulruz. From then on Romanens was part of the bailiwick of Vaulruz until 1798; it was then incorporated into the district of Bulle (1798–1848) and afterwards into the Gruyère district.

Romanens has always been part of the parish of Sâles. The village was known for tile making, the making of wooden vessels, straw plaiting and livestock farming. At the beginning of the 21st century it was still agricultural, with commuters going in particular to Romont, Bulle and Châtel-Saint-Denis. The renewed growth of the population allowed a school to reopen.

Romanens had 193 inhabitants in 1811, 227 in 1850, 320 in 1880, 314 in 1900, 236 in 1950, 154 in 1980 and 256 in 2000. In 2001 it became part of the municipality of Sâles.
