= Maules =

Former municipality, canton of Fribourg

- Former municipality
- Coat of arms
- Location of Maules
- Location within Switzerland Location within Canton of Fribourg
- Coordinates: 46.633336°N 6.983338°E
- Country: Switzerland
- Canton: Fribourg
- District: Gruyère
- Municipality: Sâles

Population (2000)
  - Total: 222
- Time zone: UTC+01:00 (CET)
  - Summer (DST): UTC+02:00 (CEST)
- ISO 3166 code: CH-FR
- Website

Maules is a former municipality in the Gruyère district of the canton of Fribourg, Switzerland, on the southern slope of the Gibloux. In 2001 it merged with Romanens, Rueyres-Treyfayes and Sâles (Gruyère) to form the municipality of Sâles.

== History ==
Maules is first mentioned in 930 as Molas. In that year the Abbey of Saint-Maurice ceded land at Maules to Turimbert. In the 12th century the village belonged to the knights of Maules, benefactors of Humilimont Abbey; between 1137 and 1148 Guillaume de Maules had given the abbey his land for the building of the grange of Les Mollettes (in the municipality of Vaulruz).

In 1394 Antoine Champion bought Maules from Antoine de la Tour, lord of Illens. From then on the village was part of the lordship of Vaulruz and belonged to the bailiwick of the same name (1538–1798), then to the district of Bulle (1798–1848) and from 1848 to the Gruyère district.

In church matters, Maules belongs to the parish of Sâles. There is a chapel of the Holy Family, or of Saint Joseph (1668, consecrated in 1671). Peat bogs were worked until about 1982; they were entered in the federal inventory of raised bogs in 1991 and in the federal inventory of mire landscapes in 1996. Agriculture consists of livestock farming and the growing of fodder crops (14 farms in 2000).

Maules had 165 inhabitants in 1811, 182 in 1850, 222 in 1900, 241 in 1950, 165 in 1980 and 222 in 2000. In 2001 it became part of the municipality of Sâles.

== Bibliography ==
- A. Dellion, Dictionnaire historique et statistique des paroisses catholiques du canton de Fribourg, vol. 11, pp. 89–91
- C. Fontaine, "Maules", in Le Vieux Chalet, 107, 1963, pp. 849–856
- B. de Vevey, Châteaux et maisons fortes du canton de Fribourg, 1978, pp. 305–309
