= Vuadens =

- Municipality
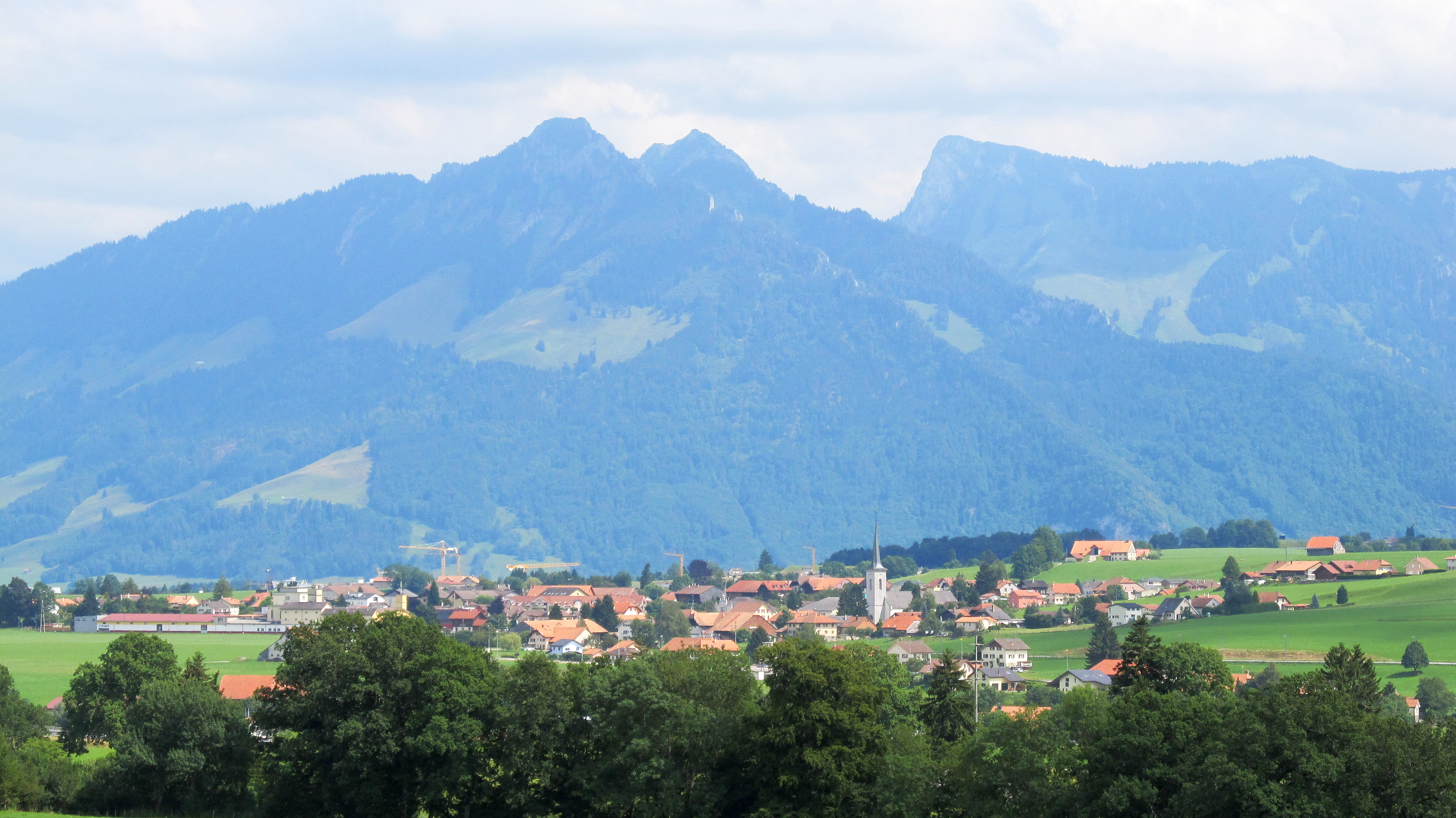

- Coat of arms
- Location of Vuadens
- Location within Switzerland Location within Canton of Fribourg
- Coordinates: 46°37′N 7°1′E
- Country: Switzerland
- Canton: Fribourg
- District: Gruyère

Government
  - Mayor: Syndic

Area
  - Total: 10.49 km^{2} (4.05 sq mi)
- Elevation: 803 m (2,635 ft)

Population (December 2020)
  - Total: 2,472
  - Density: 235.7/km^{2} (610.3/sq mi)
- Time zone: UTC+01:00 (CET)
  - Summer (DST): UTC+02:00 (CEST)
- Postal code: 1628
- SFOS number: 2160
- ISO 3166 code: CH-FR
- Surrounded by: Bulle, Echarlens, Gruyères, Riaz, Vaulruz
- Website: vuadens.ch

Vuadens (French: [vɥadɑ̃s]; Arpitan: Vouadens [vwaˈdɛ̃]) is a municipality in the district of Gruyère in the canton of Fribourg in Switzerland.

== History ==
Vuadens is first mentioned in 516 as curtis Wadingum. In 929 it was mentioned as Vuadingis.

== Geography ==
Aerial view (1949)

Vuadens has an area, as of 2009, of 10.4 square kilometers (4.0 mi^{2}). Of this area, 6.9 km^{2} (2.7 mi^{2}) or 66.1% is used for agricultural purposes, while 2.48 km^{2} (0.96 mi^{2}) or 23.8% is forested. Of the rest of the land, 1.09 km^{2} (0.42 mi^{2}) or 10.4% is settled (buildings or roads), 0.01 km^{2} (2.5 acres) or 0.1% is either rivers or lakes and 0.01 km^{2} (2.5 acres) or 0.1% is unproductive land.

Of the built up area, industrial buildings made up 1.1% of the total area while housing and buildings made up 5.9% and transportation infrastructure made up 3.2%. Out of the forested land, 20.5% of the total land area is heavily forested and 3.3% is covered with orchards or small clusters of trees. Of the agricultural land, 3.4% is used for growing crops and 43.8% is pastures and 18.6% is used for alpine pastures. All the water in the municipality is flowing water.

The municipality is located in the Gruyère district.

== Coat of arms ==
The blazon of the municipal coat of arms is Gules a Cross Argent in chief dexter a Cross bottony of the same and overall a Crane rising of the same.

== Demographics ==
Vuadens has a population (as of December 2020) of 2,472. As of 2008, 11.5% of the population are resident foreign nationals. Over the last 10 years (2000–2010) the population has changed at a rate of 19.7%. Migration accounted for 18.2%, while births and deaths accounted for 2.4%.

Most of the population (as of 2000) speaks French (1,549 or 93.5%) as their first language, German is the second most common (32 or 1.9%) and Portuguese is the third (29 or 1.8%). There are 6 people who speak Italian.

As of 2008, the population was 49.8% male and 50.2% female. The population was made up of 834 Swiss men (42.7% of the population) and 137 (7.0%) non-Swiss men. There were 873 Swiss women (44.7%) and 107 (5.5%) non-Swiss women. Of the population in the municipality, 614 or about 37.1% were born in Vuadens and lived there in 2000. There were 683 or 41.2% who were born in the same canton, while 172 or 10.4% were born somewhere else in Switzerland, and 159 or 9.6% were born outside of Switzerland.

As of 2000, children and teenagers (0–19 years old) make up 28.8% of the population, while adults (20–64 years old) make up 55.4% and seniors (over 64 years old) make up 15.8%.

As of 2000, there were 699 people who were single and never married in the municipality. There were 776 married individuals, 107 widows or widowers and 75 individuals who are divorced.

As of 2000, there were 623 private households in the municipality, and an average of 2.6 persons per household. There were 174 households that consist of only one person and 48 households with five or more people. In 2000, a total of 610 apartments (88.8% of the total) were permanently occupied, while 39 apartments (5.7%) were seasonally occupied and 38 apartments (5.5%) were empty. As of 2009, the construction rate of new housing units was 4.1 new units per 1000 residents. The vacancy rate for the municipality, in 2010, was 0.12%.

The historical population is given in the following chart:

== Politics ==
In the 2011 federal election the most popular party was the SP which received 27.4% of the vote. The next three most popular parties were the SVP (24.6%), the CVP (21.7%) and the FDP (15.0%).

The SPS improved their position in Vuadens rising to first, from third in 2007 (with 23.0%) The SVP retained about the same popularity (24.6% in 2007), the CVP moved from first in 2007 (with 25.7%) to third and the FDP retained about the same popularity (19.2% in 2007). A total of 655 votes were cast in this election, of which 10 or 1.5% were invalid.

== Economy ==
As of 2010, Vuadens had an unemployment rate of 2.4%. As of 2008, there were 80 people employed in the primary economic sector and about 31 businesses involved in this sector. 133 people were employed in the secondary sector and there were 19 businesses in this sector. 278 people were employed in the tertiary sector, with 50 businesses in this sector. There were 782 residents of the municipality who were employed in some capacity, of which females made up 41.8% of the workforce.

In 2008 the total number of full-time equivalent jobs was 397. The number of jobs in the primary sector was 62, of which 55 were in agriculture and 6 were in forestry or lumber production. The number of jobs in the secondary sector was 120 of which 46 or (38.3%) were in manufacturing and 66 (55.0%) were in construction. The number of jobs in the tertiary sector was 215. In the tertiary sector; 89 or 41.4% were in wholesale or retail sales or the repair of motor vehicles, 10 or 4.7% were in the movement and storage of goods, 24 or 11.2% were in a hotel or restaurant, 2 or 0.9% were in the information industry, 4 or 1.9% were technical professionals or scientists, 27 or 12.6% were in education and 47 or 21.9% were in health care.

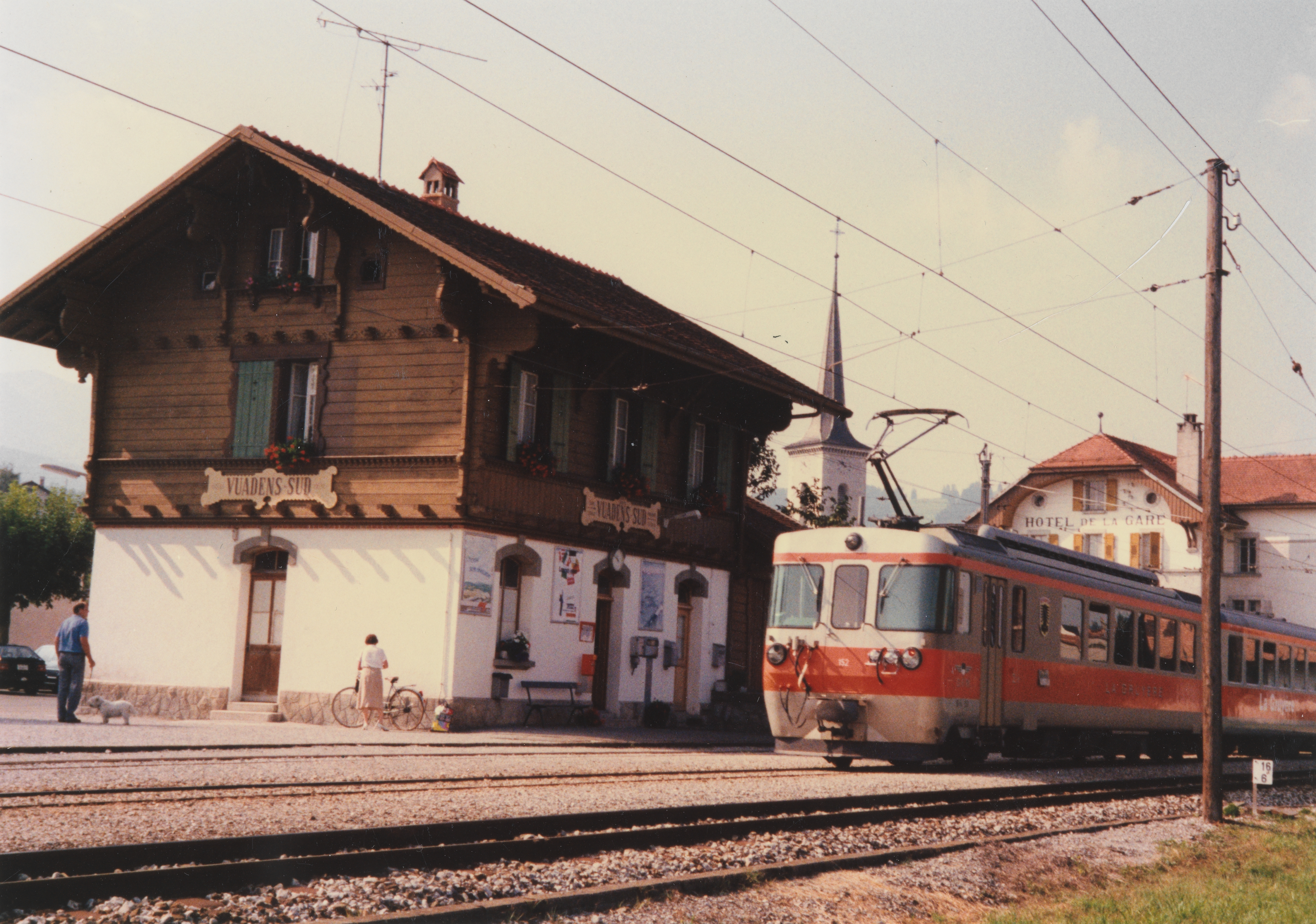
Vuadens-Sud railway station (1991)

In 2000, there were 168 workers who commuted into the municipality and 581 workers who commuted away. The municipality is a net exporter of workers, with about 3.5 workers leaving the municipality for every one entering. Of the working population, 5% used public transportation to get to work, and 74.2% used a private car. The municipality is served by Vuadens-Sud railway station on the Palézieux–Bulle–Montbovon railway line. The station Vuadens-Nord railway station on the Bulle–Romont railway line was closed in 2011.

== Religion ==
From the 2000 census, 1,411 or 85.2% were Roman Catholic, while 81 or 4.9% belonged to the Swiss Reformed Church. Of the rest of the population, there were 7 members of an Orthodox church (or about 0.42% of the population), and there were 26 individuals (or about 1.57% of the population) who belonged to another Christian church. There were 45 (or about 2.72% of the population) who were Islamic. There were 3 individuals who were Buddhist. 67 (or about 4.04% of the population) belonged to no church, are agnostic or atheist, and 30 individuals (or about 1.81% of the population) did not answer the question.

== Education ==
In Vuadens about 517 or (31.2%) of the population have completed non-mandatory upper secondary education, and 131 or (7.9%) have completed additional higher education (either university or a Fachhochschule). Of the 131 who completed tertiary schooling, 67.2% were Swiss men, 21.4% were Swiss women, 6.9% were non-Swiss men and 4.6% were non-Swiss women.

The Canton of Fribourg school system provides one year of non-obligatory Kindergarten, followed by six years of Primary school. This is followed by three years of obligatory lower Secondary school where the students are separated according to ability and aptitude. Following the lower Secondary students may attend a three or four year optional upper Secondary school. The upper Secondary school is divided into gymnasium (university preparatory) and vocational programs. After they finish the upper Secondary program, students may choose to attend a Tertiary school or continue their apprenticeship.

During the 2010-11 school year, there were a total of 256 students attending 12 classes in Vuadens. A total of 428 students from the municipality attended any school, either in the municipality or outside of it. There were 3 kindergarten classes with a total of 69 students in the municipality. The municipality had 9 primary classes and 187 students. During the same year, there were no lower secondary classes in the municipality, but 72 students attended lower secondary school in a neighboring municipality. There were no upper Secondary classes or vocational classes, but there were 31 upper Secondary students and 58 upper Secondary vocational students who attended classes in another municipality. The municipality had no non-university Tertiary classes, but there were 3 non-university Tertiary students and 9 specialized Tertiary students who attended classes in another municipality.

As of 2000, there were 39 students in Vuadens who came from another municipality, while 132 residents attended schools outside the municipality.
