= Sâles (Gruyère) =

Former municipality, canton of Fribourg

- Former municipality
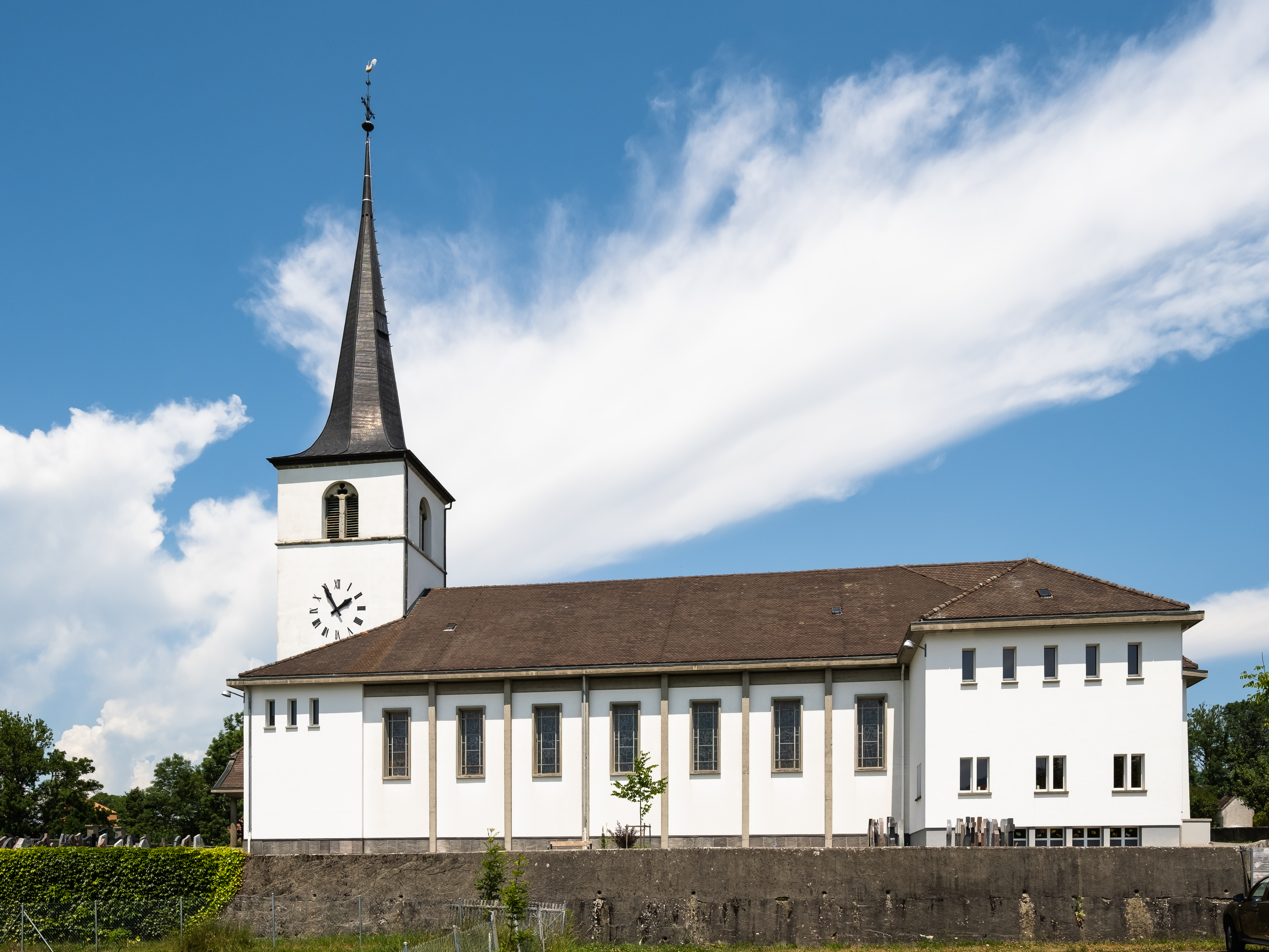
- Church of Saint Stephen
- Location of Sâles (Gruyère)
- Location within Switzerland Location within Canton of Fribourg
- Coordinates: 46.63763°N 6.97363°E
- Country: Switzerland
- Canton: Fribourg
- District: Gruyère
- Municipality: Sâles

Population (2000)
  - Total: 589
- Time zone: UTC+01:00 (CET)
  - Summer (DST): UTC+02:00 (CEST)
- ISO 3166 code: CH-FR
- Website

Sâles (Gruyère) is a former municipality in the Gruyère district of the canton of Fribourg, Switzerland. In 2001 it merged with Maules, Romanens and Rueyres-Treyfayes to form the municipality of Sâles.

== History ==
Sâles is first mentioned in 1177 as Cella de Sale. In that year Pope Alexander III confirmed the possessions of the Great St Bernard Hospice in Sâles. From the end of the 13th century Sâles was part of the lordship of Vaulruz, which became a bailiwick of Fribourg in 1538, and from 1798 to 1848 of the district of Bulle.

The parish includes Maules, Romanens and Rueyres-Treyfayes. The advowson belonged to the Great St Bernard, then to the government of Fribourg (from 1538) and to the chapter of Saint Nicholas in Fribourg (from 1603). The church of Saint Stephen dates from 1640 and was given a new nave in 1957. There has been an orphanage since 1880.

In the 19th century Sâles had a straw industry. In 1868 it received a railway station on the Bulle–Romont line of the GFM. Grain growing, important in the past, has given way to livestock farming and fodder crops. The secondary sector has seen some development, with a textile factory (1957–1969) and Bumotec SA (machine tools, since 1977). The peat bog of Les Mosses has been listed in the federal inventory of raised bogs of national importance since 1991.

Sâles had 368 inhabitants in 1811, 383 in 1850, 443 in 1900, 574 in 1950 and 589 in 2000.

== Bibliography ==
- A. Dellion, Dictionnaire historique et statistique des paroisses catholiques du canton de Fribourg, vol. 11, pp. 73–100
- La Liberté, 18 September 1969
- Fribourg illustré, 13, 1978, pp. 5–10
- D. Kolly, Das Moor von Sâles, licentiate thesis, Fribourg, 1991
- A. Hehli, Le paupérisme rural en Gruyère 1880–1930, licentiate thesis, Fribourg, 2003
