= Rueyres-Treyfayes =

Former municipality, canton of Fribourg

- Former municipality
- Location of Rueyres-Treyfayes
- Location within Switzerland Location within Canton of Fribourg
- Coordinates: 46.64904°N 6.95883°E
- Country: Switzerland
- Canton: Fribourg
- District: Gruyère
- Municipality: Sâles

Population (2000)
  - Total: 124
- Time zone: UTC+01:00 (CET)
  - Summer (DST): UTC+02:00 (CEST)
- ISO 3166 code: CH-FR
- Website

Rueyres-Treyfayes is a former municipality in the Gruyère district of the canton of Fribourg, Switzerland, on the southern flank of the Gibloux. In 2001 it merged with Maules, Romanens and Sâles (Gruyère) to form the municipality of Sâles.

== History ==
Rueyres-Treyfayes is first mentioned in 1137–1138 as Ruvorio and in 1316 as Ruery-Treiffay. Remains of a Roman settlement and a necropolis of undetermined date have been found there. The forests of Rueyres-Treyfayes were assigned to Humilimont Abbey in 1137–1138.

In the 15th century the village formed a small lordship. It belonged first to the Esseiva family, then to the von der Weid family (1585) and the Gottrau family. Rueyres-Treyfayes was incorporated into the bailiwick of Romont in 1536 and later belonged to the districts of Bulle (1798–1803 and 1815–1848) and Romont (1803–1815).

The village first belonged to the parish of Vuisternens-devant-Romont, and from 1663 to that of Sâles. A chapel dedicated to Saints Peter, Felix and Lupus was built between 1602 and 1644. At the beginning of the 21st century Rueyres-Treyfayes had kept its rural character.

Rueyres-Treyfayes had 214 inhabitants in 1850, 210 in 1900, 191 in 1950 and 124 in 2000. In 2001 it became part of the municipality of Sâles.

== Bibliography ==
- A. Dellion, Dictionnaire historique et statistique des paroisses catholiques du canton de Fribourg, vol. 11, pp. 91–95
- La Liberté, 8 September 1969 and 17 August 1983
