= List of mayors of Bulle =

This is a list of mayors of Bulle, Switzerland.

Mayor (Syndic) of Bulle
Term	Mayor	Lifespan	Party	Notes
1876–1885	Jules Glasson	(1839–1903)		
–1898	Eugène Glasson	(1820–1898)		
1916–1922	Lucien Desponds	(1869–1951)		
1922–1942	James Glasson	(1878–1952)		
1970–1974	Auguste Glasson			
1994–2009	Jean-Paul Glasson	(born 1949)	PRD/FDP	
2009–present	Yves Menoud		PDC/CVP	
