= Sâles, Fribourg =

Sâles
- Municipality
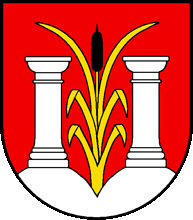
- Coat of arms
- Location of Sâles
- Location within Switzerland Location within Canton of Fribourg
- Coordinates: 46°38′N 6°58′E
- Country: Switzerland
- Canton: Fribourg
- District: Gruyère

Government
  - Mayor: Syndic

Area
  - Total: 18.78 km^{2} (7.25 sq mi)
- Elevation: 825 m (2,707 ft)

Population (December 2020)
  - Total: 1,452
  - Density: 77.32/km^{2} (200.2/sq mi)
- Time zone: UTC+01:00 (CET)
  - Summer (DST): UTC+02:00 (CEST)
- Postal code: 1625
- SFOS number: 2152
- ISO 3166 code: CH-FR
- Localities: Maules, Romanens, Rueyres-Treyfayes, Sâles
- Surrounded by: Grangettes, La Verrerie, Marsens, Riaz, Semsales, Vaulruz, Vuisternens-devant-Romont
- Website: www.sales.ch

Sâles (French: [sɑl], Franco-Provençal: [ˈʃɑlɛ]) is a municipality in the district of Gruyère in the canton of Fribourg in Switzerland. In 2001 the municipality was created when Maules, Romanens, Rueyres-Treyfayes and Sâles (Gruyère) merged.

== Geography ==
Sâles has an area, as of 2009, of 18.8 square kilometers (7.3 mi^{2}). Of this area, 13.66 km^{2} (5.27 mi^{2}) or 72.7% is used for agricultural purposes, while 3.79 km^{2} (1.46 mi^{2}) or 20.2% is forested. Of the rest of the land, 1.14 km^{2} (0.44 mi^{2}) or 6.1% is settled (buildings or roads) and 0.19 km^{2} (0.073 mi^{2}) or 1.0% is unproductive land.

Of the built up area, housing and buildings made up 2.7% and transportation infrastructure made up 2.8%. Out of the forested land, 18.6% of the total land area is heavily forested and 1.6% is covered with orchards or small clusters of trees. Of the agricultural land, 14.6% is used for growing crops and 56.6% is pastures.

The municipality is located in the Gruyère district. It consists of the villages of Maules, Romanens, Rueyres-Treyfayes and Sâles (Gruyère) which merged in 2001.

== Coat of arms ==
The blazon of the municipal coat of arms is Gules between two Columns Argent issuant from as many mounts of the same a Bulrush Or seeded Sable.

== Demographics ==
Sâles has a population (as of December 2020) of 1,452. As of 2008, 5.2% of the population are resident foreign nationals. Over the last 10 years (2000–2010) the population has changed at a rate of 15.8%. Migration accounted for 11.9%, while births and deaths accounted for 3.8%.

Most of the population (as of 2000) speaks French (562 or 95.4%) as their first language, German is the second most common (11 or 1.9%) and Portuguese is the third (10 or 1.7%). There is 1 person who speaks Italian.

As of 2008, the population was 49.7% male and 50.3% female. The population was made up of 632 Swiss men (46.5% of the population) and 44 (3.2%) non-Swiss men. There were 649 Swiss women (47.7%) and 35 (2.6%) non-Swiss women. Of the population in the municipality, 250 or about 42.4% were born in Sâles and lived there in 2000. There were 246 or 41.8% who were born in the same canton, while 44 or 7.5% were born somewhere else in Switzerland, and 40 or 6.8% were born outside of Switzerland.

As of 2000, children and teenagers (0–19 years old) make up 31.2% of the population, while adults (20–64 years old) make up 54% and seniors (over 64 years old) make up 14.9%.

As of 2000, there were 270 people who were single and never married in the municipality. There were 284 married individuals, 27 widows or widowers and 8 individuals who are divorced.

As of 2000, there were 387 private households in the municipality, and an average of 3. persons per household. There were 32 households that consist of only one person and 34 households with five or more people. In 2000, a total of 177 apartments (92.2% of the total) were permanently occupied, while 7 apartments (3.6%) were seasonally occupied and 8 apartments (4.2%) were empty. As of 2009, the construction rate of new housing units was 9.5 new units per 1000 residents.

== Sights ==
The entire hamlet of Rueyres-Treyfayes is designated as part of the Inventory of Swiss Heritage Sites.

== Politics ==
In the 2011 federal election the most popular party was the SVP which received 25.2% of the vote. The next three most popular parties were the SP (24.3%), the CVP (21.9%) and the FDP (13.2%).

The SVP improved their position in Sâles rising to first, from second in 2007 (with 26.6%) The SPS moved from third in 2007 (with 20.4%) to second in 2011, the CVP moved from first in 2007 (with 32.7%) to third and the FDP retained about the same popularity (12.6% in 2007). A total of 545 votes were cast in this election, of which 6 or 1.1% were invalid.

== Economy ==
As of 2010, Sâles had an unemployment rate of 1.3%. As of 2008, there were 156 people employed in the primary economic sector and about 60 businesses involved in this sector. 239 people were employed in the secondary sector and there were 21 businesses in this sector. 168 people were employed in the tertiary sector, with 20 businesses in this sector. There were 268 residents of the municipality who were employed in some capacity, of which females made up 42.2% of the workforce.

In 2008 the total number of full-time equivalent jobs was 484. The number of jobs in the primary sector was 127, all of which were in agriculture. The number of jobs in the secondary sector was 232 of which 187 or (80.6%) were in manufacturing and 42 (18.1%) were in construction. The number of jobs in the tertiary sector was 125. In the tertiary sector; 33 or 26.4% were in wholesale or retail sales or the repair of motor vehicles, 14 or 11.2% were in a hotel or restaurant, 10 or 8.0% were the insurance or financial industry, 9 or 7.2% were in education and 38 or 30.4% were in health care.

In 2000, there were 141 workers who commuted into the municipality and 153 workers who commuted away. The municipality is a net exporter of workers, with about 1.1 workers leaving the municipality for every one entering. Of the working population, 6.7% used public transportation to get to work, and 57.5% used a private car.

== Religion ==
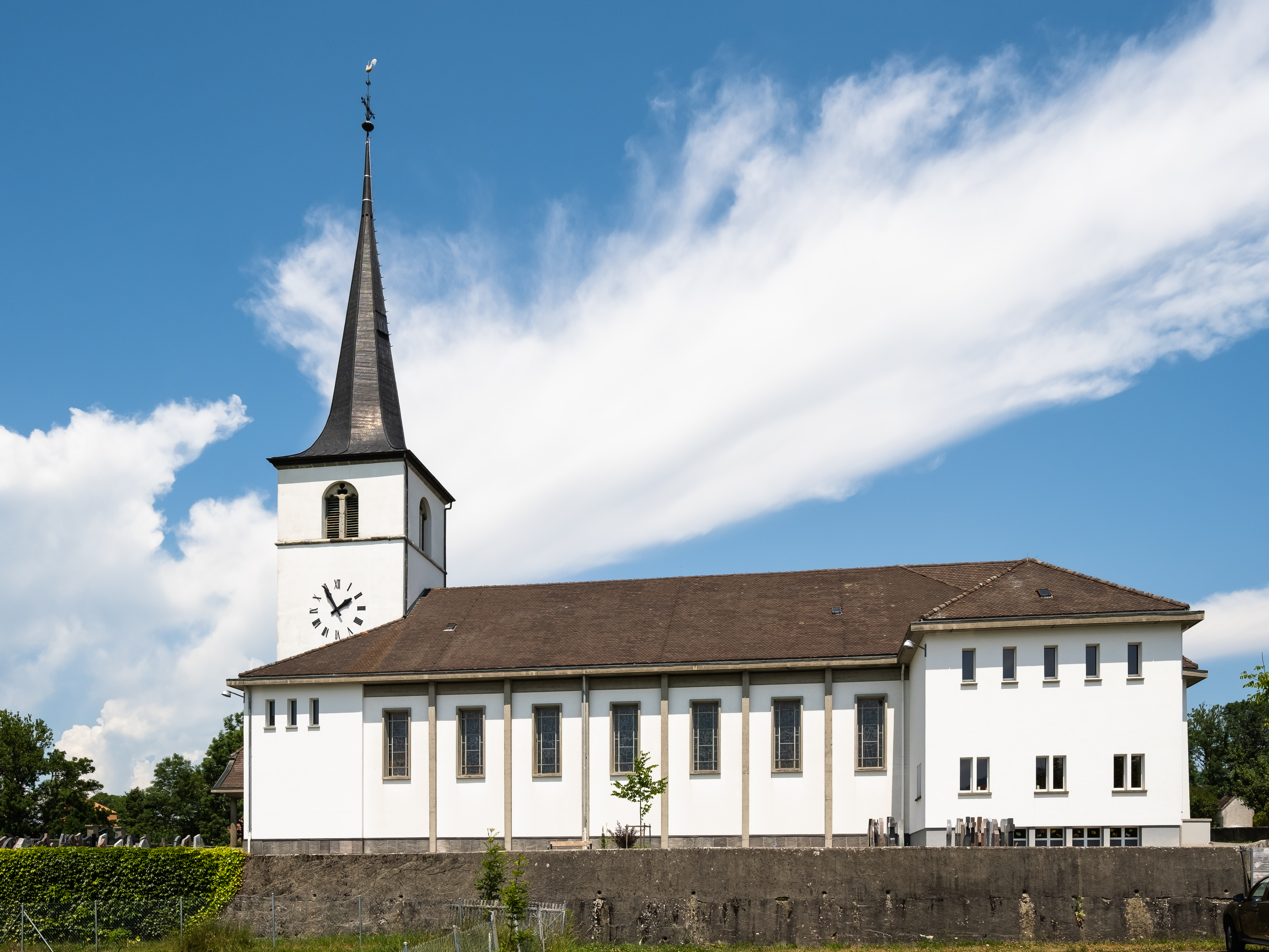
The church of Saint-Etienne in Sâles

From the 2000 census, 522 or 88.6% were Roman Catholic, while 19 or 3.2% belonged to the Swiss Reformed Church. There were 22 (or about 3.74% of the population) who were Islamic. There was 1 person who was Buddhist. 17 (or about 2.89% of the population) belonged to no church, are agnostic or atheist, and 8 individuals (or about 1.36% of the population) did not answer the question.

== Education ==
In Sâles about 157 or (26.7%) of the population have completed non-mandatory upper secondary education, and 43 or (7.3%) have completed additional higher education (either university or a Fachhochschule). Of the 43 who completed tertiary schooling, 76.7% were Swiss men, 20.9% were Swiss women.

The Canton of Fribourg school system provides one year of non-obligatory Kindergarten, followed by six years of Primary school. This is followed by three years of obligatory lower Secondary school where the students are separated according to ability and aptitude. Following the lower Secondary students may attend a three or four year optional upper Secondary school. The upper Secondary school is divided into gymnasium (university preparatory) and vocational programs. After they finish the upper Secondary program, students may choose to attend a Tertiary school or continue their apprenticeship.

During the 2010-11 school year, there were a total of 131 students attending 7 classes in Sâles. A total of 295 students from the municipality attended any school, either in the municipality or outside of it. There was one kindergarten class with a total of 12 students in the municipality. The municipality had 6 primary classes and 119 students. During the same year, there were no lower secondary classes in the municipality, but 72 students attended lower secondary school in a neighboring municipality. There were no upper Secondary classes or vocational classes, but there were 24 upper Secondary students and 58 upper Secondary vocational students who attended classes in another municipality. The municipality had no non-university Tertiary classes, but there were 3 non-university Tertiary students and 7 specialized Tertiary students who attended classes in another municipality.

As of 2000, there were 48 students in Sâles who came from another municipality, while 69 residents attended schools outside the municipality.
