= Riaz =

- Municipality
- Coat of arms
- Location of Riaz
- Location within Switzerland Location within Canton of Fribourg
- Coordinates: 46°38′30″N 7°3′45″E
- Country: Switzerland
- Canton: Fribourg
- District: Gruyère

Government
  - Mayor: Syndic

Area
  - Total: 7.78 km^{2} (3.00 sq mi)
- Elevation: 720 m (2,360 ft)

Population (December 2020)
  - Total: 2,815
  - Density: 362/km^{2} (937/sq mi)
- Demonym: Riazois
- Time zone: UTC+01:00 (CET)
  - Summer (DST): UTC+02:00 (CEST)
- Postal code: 1632
- SFOS number: 2148
- ISO 3166 code: CH-FR
- Surrounded by: Bulle, Vaulruz, Sâles, Marsens, Echarlens
- Website: www.riaz.ch

Riaz (French: [ʁija]; Arpitan: Rua, pronounced [ˈʁija] or [ʁja]) is a municipality in the district of Gruyère in the canton of Fribourg in Switzerland.

== History ==
Riaz is first mentioned in 900 as Villa Roda. The municipality was formerly known by its German name Zum Rad, however, that name is no longer used.

== Geography ==
Riaz has an area, as of 2009, of 7.8 square kilometers (3.0 mi^{2}). Of this area, 4.82 km^{2} (1.86 mi^{2}) or 62.1% is used for agricultural purposes, while 2 km^{2} (0.77 mi^{2}) or 25.8% is forested. Of the rest of the land, 0.95 km^{2} (0.37 mi^{2}) or 12.2% is settled (buildings or roads), 0.01 km^{2} (2.5 acres) or 0.1% is either rivers or lakes.

Of the built up area, housing and buildings made up 7.0% and transportation infrastructure made up 4.3%. Out of the forested land, 23.6% of the total land area is heavily forested and 2.2% is covered with orchards or small clusters of trees. Of the agricultural land, 16.2% is used for growing crops and 35.1% is pastures and 10.7% is used for alpine pastures. All the water in the municipality is flowing water.

The municipality is located in the Gruyère district and neighbors the district capital of Bulle. The village of Riaz is located along the Bulle-Fribourg road.

== Coat of arms ==
The blazon of the municipal coat of arms is Gules a Wheel argent.

== Demographics ==
Riaz has a population (as of December 2020) of 2,815. As of 2008, 12.7% of the population are resident foreign nationals. Over the last 10 years (2000–2010) the population has changed at a rate of 29.1%. Migration accounted for 25.3%, while births and deaths accounted for 7.9%.

Most of the population (as of 2000) speaks French (1,520 or 92.2%) as their first language, German is the second most common (55 or 3.3%) and Portuguese is the third (16 or 1.0%). There are 8 people who speak Italian and 2 people who speak Romansh.

As of 2008, the population was 49.2% male and 50.8% female. The population was made up of 879 Swiss men (41.9% of the population) and 153 (7.3%) non-Swiss men. There were 928 Swiss women (44.3%) and 137 (6.5%) non-Swiss women. Of the population in the municipality, 378 or about 22.9% were born in Riaz and lived there in 2000. There were 807 or 49.0% who were born in the same canton, while 200 or 12.1% were born somewhere else in Switzerland, and 212 or 12.9% were born outside of Switzerland.

As of 2000, children and teenagers (0–19 years old) make up 26.9% of the population, while adults (20–64 years old) make up 62.6% and seniors (over 64 years old) make up 10.6%.

As of 2000, there were 721 people who were single and never married in the municipality. There were 778 married individuals, 78 widows or widowers and 71 individuals who are divorced.

As of 2000, there were 637 private households in the municipality, and an average of 2.6 persons per household. There were 167 households that consist of only one person and 61 households with five or more people. In 2000, a total of 622 apartments (89.8% of the total) were permanently occupied, while 57 apartments (8.2%) were seasonally occupied and 14 apartments (2.0%) were empty. As of 2009, the construction rate of new housing units was 17.9 new units per 1000 residents. The vacancy rate for the municipality, in 2010, was 0.11%.

The historical population is given in the following chart:

== Heritage sites of national significance ==
The Gallo-Roman villa at L’Etrey and the Paysanne House are listed as Swiss heritage site of national significance.

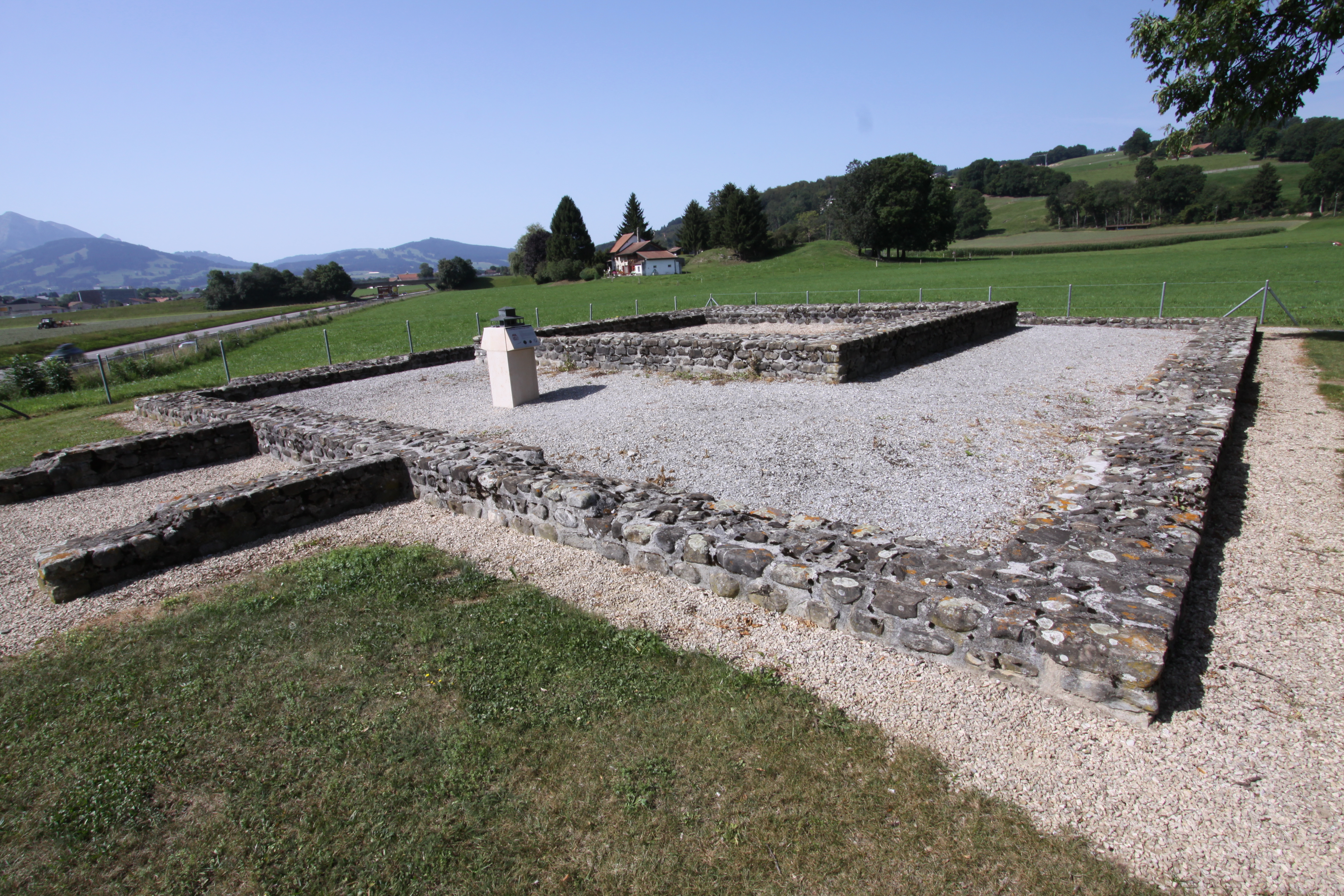
Gallo-Roman building at L'Etrey

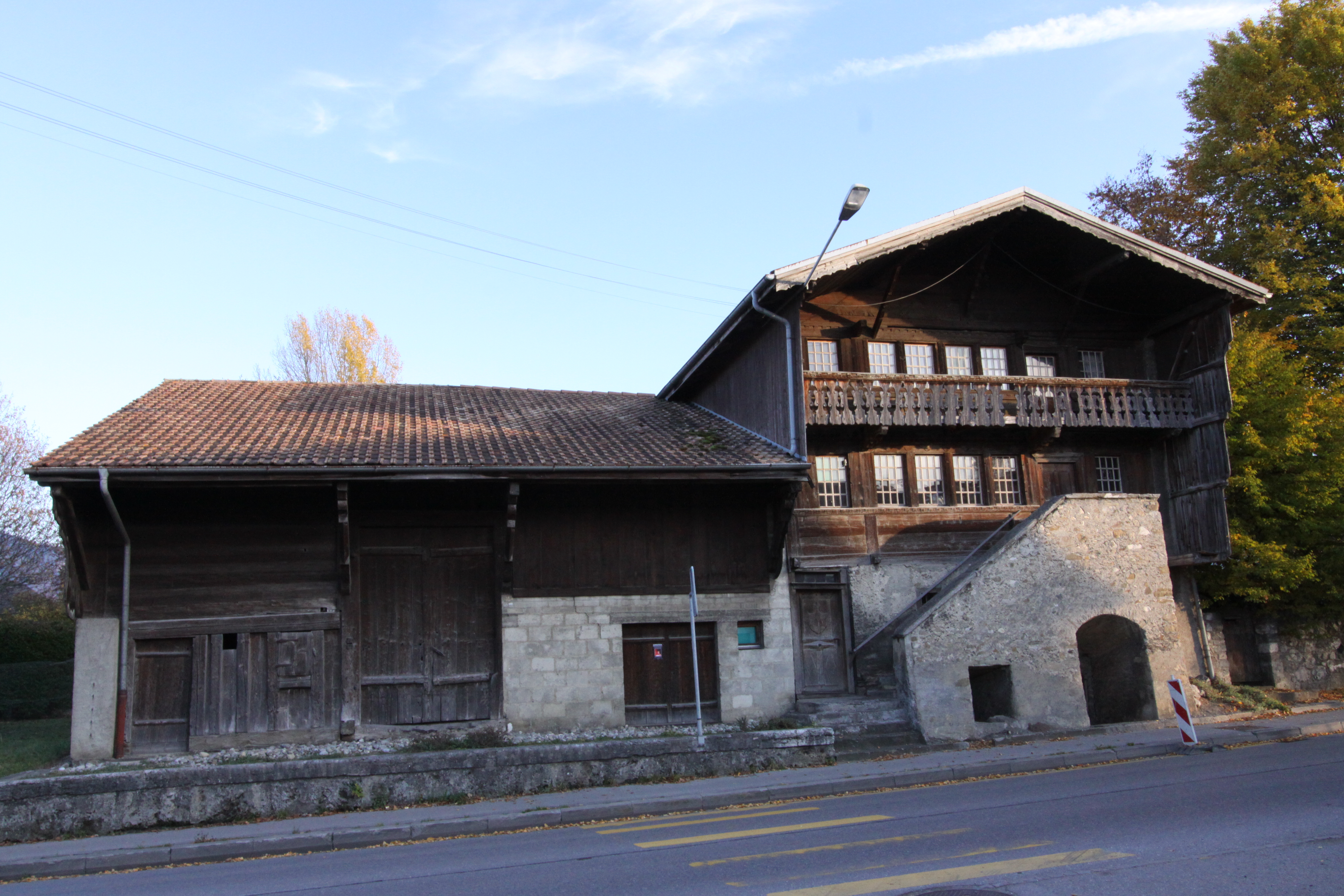
Paysanne House in Riaz

== Politics ==
In the 2011 federal election the most popular party was the SVP which received 25.6% of the vote. The next three most popular parties were the SP (25.6%), the FDP (18.6%) and the CVP (17.0%).

The SVP received about the same percentage of the vote as they did in the 2007 Federal election (25.3% in 2007 vs 25.6% in 2011). The SPS moved from third in 2007 (with 21.5%) to second in 2011, the FDP moved from fourth in 2007 (with 17.5%) to third and the CVP moved from second in 2007 (with 24.8%) to fourth. A total of 684 votes were cast in this election, of which 12 or 1.8% were invalid.

== Economy ==
As of 2010, Riaz had an unemployment rate of 3.1%. As of 2008, there were 36 people employed in the primary economic sector and about 14 businesses involved in this sector. 132 people were employed in the secondary sector and there were 16 businesses in this sector. 747 people were employed in the tertiary sector, with 49 businesses in this sector. There were 877 residents of the municipality who were employed in some capacity, of which females made up 42.8% of the workforce.

In 2008 the total number of full-time equivalent jobs was 756. The number of jobs in the primary sector was 27, all of which were in agriculture. The number of jobs in the secondary sector was 128 of which 32 or (25.0%) were in manufacturing and 90 (70.3%) were in construction. The number of jobs in the tertiary sector was 601. In the tertiary sector; 41 or 6.8% were in wholesale or retail sales or the repair of motor vehicles, 47 or 7.8% were in the movement and storage of goods, 11 or 1.8% were in a hotel or restaurant, 2 or 0.3% were in the information industry, 13 or 2.2% were the insurance or financial industry, 16 or 2.7% were technical professionals or scientists, 35 or 5.8% were in education and 402 or 66.9% were in health care.

In 2000, there were 376 workers who commuted into the municipality and 682 workers who commuted away. The municipality is a net exporter of workers, with about 1.8 workers leaving the municipality for every one entering. Of the working population, 6% used public transportation to get to work, and 77.7% used a private car.

== Religion ==
From the 2000 census, 1,382 or 83.9% were Roman Catholic, while 72 or 4.4% belonged to the Swiss Reformed Church. Of the rest of the population, there were 15 members of an Orthodox church (or about 0.91% of the population), there was 1 individual who belongs to the Christian Catholic Church, and there were 4 individuals (or about 0.24% of the population) who belonged to another Christian church. There were 37 (or about 2.25% of the population) who were Islamic. There were 2 individuals who were Hindu. 88 (or about 5.34% of the population) belonged to no church, are agnostic or atheist, and 49 individuals (or about 2.97% of the population) did not answer the question.

== Education ==
In Riaz about 576 or (35.0%) of the population have completed non-mandatory upper secondary education, and 200 or (12.1%) have completed additional higher education (either university or a Fachhochschule). Of the 200 who completed tertiary schooling, 65.5% were Swiss men, 19.5% were Swiss women, 8.0% were non-Swiss men and 7.0% were non-Swiss women.

The Canton of Fribourg school system provides one year of non-obligatory Kindergarten, followed by six years of Primary school. This is followed by three years of obligatory lower Secondary school where the students are separated according to ability and aptitude. Following the lower Secondary students may attend a three or four year optional upper Secondary school. The upper Secondary school is divided into gymnasium (university preparatory) and vocational programs. After they finish the upper Secondary program, students may choose to attend a Tertiary school or continue their apprenticeship.

During the 2010–11 school year, there were a total of 230 students attending 16 classes in Riaz. A total of 415 students from the municipality attended any school, either in the municipality or outside of it. There were 3 kindergarten classes with a total of 49 students in the municipality. The municipality had 8 primary classes and 156 students. During the same year, there were no lower secondary classes in the municipality, but 79 students attended lower secondary school in a neighboring municipality. There were no upper Secondary classes or vocational classes, but there were 38 upper Secondary students and 86 upper Secondary vocational students who attended classes in another municipality. The municipality had 5 special Tertiary classes, with 25 specialized Tertiary students.

As of 2000, there were 21 students in Riaz who came from another municipality, while 152 residents attended schools outside the municipality.
