= Vaulruz =

- Municipality
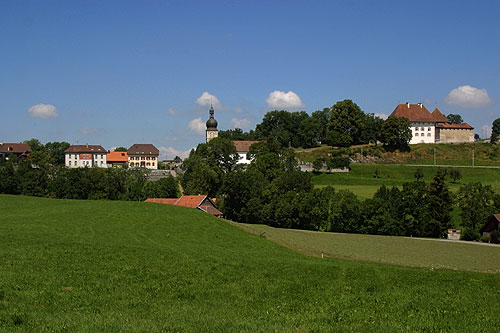
- Vaulruz village

- Coat of arms
- Location of Vaulruz
- Location within Switzerland Location within Canton of Fribourg
- Coordinates: 46°37′N 6°59′E
- Country: Switzerland
- Canton: Fribourg
- District: Gruyère

Government
  - Mayor: Syndic

Area
  - Total: 10.09 km^{2} (3.90 sq mi)
- Elevation: 820 m (2,690 ft)

Population (December 2020)
  - Total: 1,085
  - Density: 107.5/km^{2} (278.5/sq mi)
- Time zone: UTC+01:00 (CET)
  - Summer (DST): UTC+02:00 (CEST)
- Postal code: 1627
- SFOS number: 2155
- ISO 3166 code: CH-FR
- Surrounded by: Gruyères, Riaz, Sâles, Semsales, Vuadens
- Website: https://www.vaulruz.ch SFSO statistics

Vaulruz (French: [voʁy]; Arpitan: Vâlruz [ˈvoʁy]) is a municipality in the district of Gruyère in the canton of Fribourg in Switzerland.

== History ==
Vaulruz is first mentioned in 1115 as Valle Rodulphi. It was first mentioned at Vaulruz in 1303.

== Geography ==
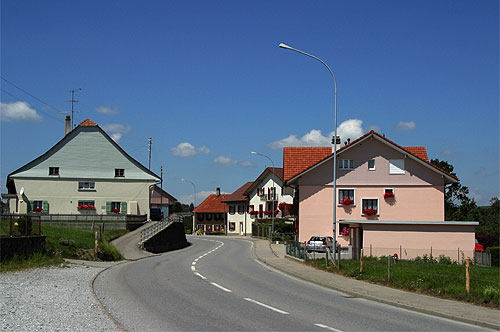
Eastern entrance into the village

Vaulruz has an area, as of 2009, of 10.2 square kilometers (3.9 mi^{2}). Of this area, 6.5 km^{2} (2.5 mi^{2}) or 64.0% is used for agricultural purposes, while 2.65 km^{2} (1.02 mi^{2}) or 26.1% is forested. Of the rest of the land, 0.9 km^{2} (0.35 mi^{2}) or 8.9% is settled (buildings or roads), 0.04 km^{2} (9.9 acres) or 0.4% is either rivers or lakes.

Of the built up area, housing and buildings made up 3.5% and transportation infrastructure made up 4.9%. Out of the forested land, 24.8% of the total land area is heavily forested and 1.3% is covered with orchards or small clusters of trees. Of the agricultural land, 10.0% is used for growing crops and 48.8% is pastures and 4.9% is used for alpine pastures. All the water in the municipality is flowing water.

The municipality is located in the Gruyère district, on the Bulle-Châtel-Saint-Denis road. It consists of the village of Vaulruz and a number of hamlets.

== Coat of arms ==
The blazon of the municipal coat of arms is Gules a Barrulet wavy Argent abased overall three Pine Trees Vert trunked proper issuant from Coupeaux of the third.

== Demographics ==
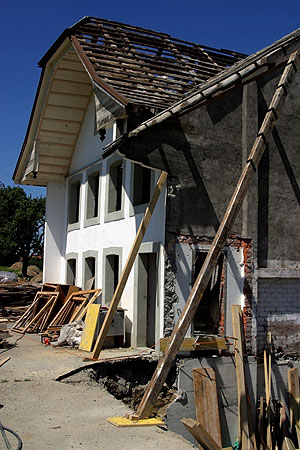
House in Vaulruz

Vaulruz has a population (as of December 2020) of 1,085. As of 2008, 7.3% of the population are resident foreign nationals. Over the last 10 years (2000–2010) the population has changed at a rate of 15.4%. Migration accounted for 5.7%, while births and deaths accounted for 7.5%.

Most of the population (as of 2000) speaks French (843 or 96.3%) as their first language, German is the second most common (21 or 2.4%) and Portuguese is the third (7 or 0.8%). There is 1 person who speaks Italian and 1 person who speaks Romansh.

As of 2008, the population was 48.9% male and 51.1% female. The population was made up of 436 Swiss men (44.5% of the population) and 43 (4.4%) non-Swiss men. There were 462 Swiss women (47.1%) and 39 (4.0%) non-Swiss women. Of the population in the municipality, 396 or about 45.3% were born in Vaulruz and lived there in 2000. There were 315 or 36.0% who were born in the same canton, while 95 or 10.9% were born somewhere else in Switzerland, and 60 or 6.9% were born outside of Switzerland.

As of 2000, children and teenagers (0–19 years old) make up 27.4% of the population, while adults (20–64 years old) make up 61.8% and seniors (over 64 years old) make up 10.7%.

As of 2000, there were 405 people who were single and never married in the municipality. There were 413 married individuals, 39 widows or widowers and 18 individuals who are divorced.

As of 2000, there were 322 private households in the municipality, and an average of 2.7 persons per household. There were 87 households that consist of only one person and 46 households with five or more people. In 2000, a total of 309 apartments (88.8% of the total) were permanently occupied, while 25 apartments (7.2%) were seasonally occupied and 14 apartments (4.0%) were empty. As of 2009, the construction rate of new housing units was 9.2 new units per 1000 residents. The vacancy rate for the municipality, in 2010, was 0.5%.

The historical population is given in the following chart:

== Politics ==
In the 2011 federal election the most popular party was the CVP which received 28.1% of the vote. The next three most popular parties were the SVP (22.6%), the SP (19.0%) and the FDP (17.7%).

The CVP lost about 6.7% of the vote when compared to the 2007 Federal election (34.8% in 2007 vs 28.1% in 2011). The SVP retained about the same popularity (23.9% in 2007), the SPS moved from fourth in 2007 (with 14.7%) to third and the FDP moved from third in 2007 (with 15.2%) to fourth. A total of 345 votes were cast in this election, of which 3 or 0.9% were invalid.

== Economy ==
As of 2010, Vaulruz had an unemployment rate of 1.6%. As of 2008, there were 88 people employed in the primary economic sector and about 32 businesses involved in this sector. 108 people were employed in the secondary sector and there were 17 businesses in this sector. 186 people were employed in the tertiary sector, with 26 businesses in this sector. There were 450 residents of the municipality who were employed in some capacity, of which females made up 40.2% of the workforce.

In 2008 the total number of full-time equivalent jobs was 326. The number of jobs in the primary sector was 63, all of which were in agriculture. The number of jobs in the secondary sector was 103 of which 95 or (92.2%) were in manufacturing and 8 (7.8%) were in construction. The number of jobs in the tertiary sector was 160. In the tertiary sector; 26 or 16.3% were in wholesale or retail sales or the repair of motor vehicles, 6 or 3.8% were in the movement and storage of goods, 15 or 9.4% were in a hotel or restaurant, 2 or 1.3% were in the information industry, 11 or 6.9% were technical professionals or scientists, 7 or 4.4% were in education and 3 or 1.9% were in health care.

In 2000, there were 107 workers who commuted into the municipality and 308 workers who commuted away. The municipality is a net exporter of workers, with about 2.9 workers leaving the municipality for every one entering. Of the working population, 5.1% used public transportation to get to work, and 71.1% used a private car. It is served by one stations the Vaulruz-Sud railway station on the Palézieux–Bulle–Montbovon railway line.

== Religion ==
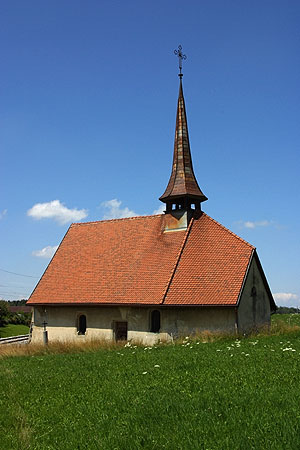
Old Chapel outside Vaulruz

From the 2000 census, 758 or 86.6% were Roman Catholic, while 33 or 3.8% belonged to the Swiss Reformed Church. Of the rest of the population, there were 18 individuals (or about 2.06% of the population) who belonged to another Christian church. There were 16 (or about 1.83% of the population) who were Islamic. There were 2 individuals who were Buddhist and 1 individual who belonged to another church. 36 (or about 4.11% of the population) belonged to no church, are agnostic or atheist, and 15 individuals (or about 1.71% of the population) did not answer the question.

== Education ==
In Vaulruz about 298 or (34.1%) of the population have completed non-mandatory upper secondary education, and 92 or (10.5%) have completed additional higher education (either university or a Fachhochschule). Of the 92 who completed tertiary schooling, 73.9% were Swiss men, 21.7% were Swiss women.

The Canton of Fribourg school system provides one year of non-obligatory Kindergarten, followed by six years of Primary school. This is followed by three years of obligatory lower Secondary school where the students are separated according to ability and aptitude. Following the lower Secondary students may attend a three or four year optional upper Secondary school. The upper Secondary school is divided into gymnasium (university preparatory) and vocational programs. After they finish the upper Secondary program, students may choose to attend a Tertiary school or continue their apprenticeship.

During the 2010-11 school year, there were a total of 98 students attending 5 classes in Vaulruz. A total of 193 students from the municipality attended any school, either in the municipality or outside of it. There was one kindergarten class with a total of 14 students in the municipality. The municipality had 4 primary classes and 84 students. During the same year, there were no lower secondary classes in the municipality, but 49 students attended lower secondary school in a neighboring municipality. There were no upper Secondary classes or vocational classes, but there were 10 upper Secondary students and 28 upper Secondary vocational students who attended classes in another municipality. The municipality had no non-university Tertiary classes, but there were 3 non-university Tertiary students and 4 specialized Tertiary students who attended classes in another municipality.

As of 2000, there were 18 students in Vaulruz who came from another municipality, while 67 residents attended schools outside the municipality.
