= Bulle =

- Municipality
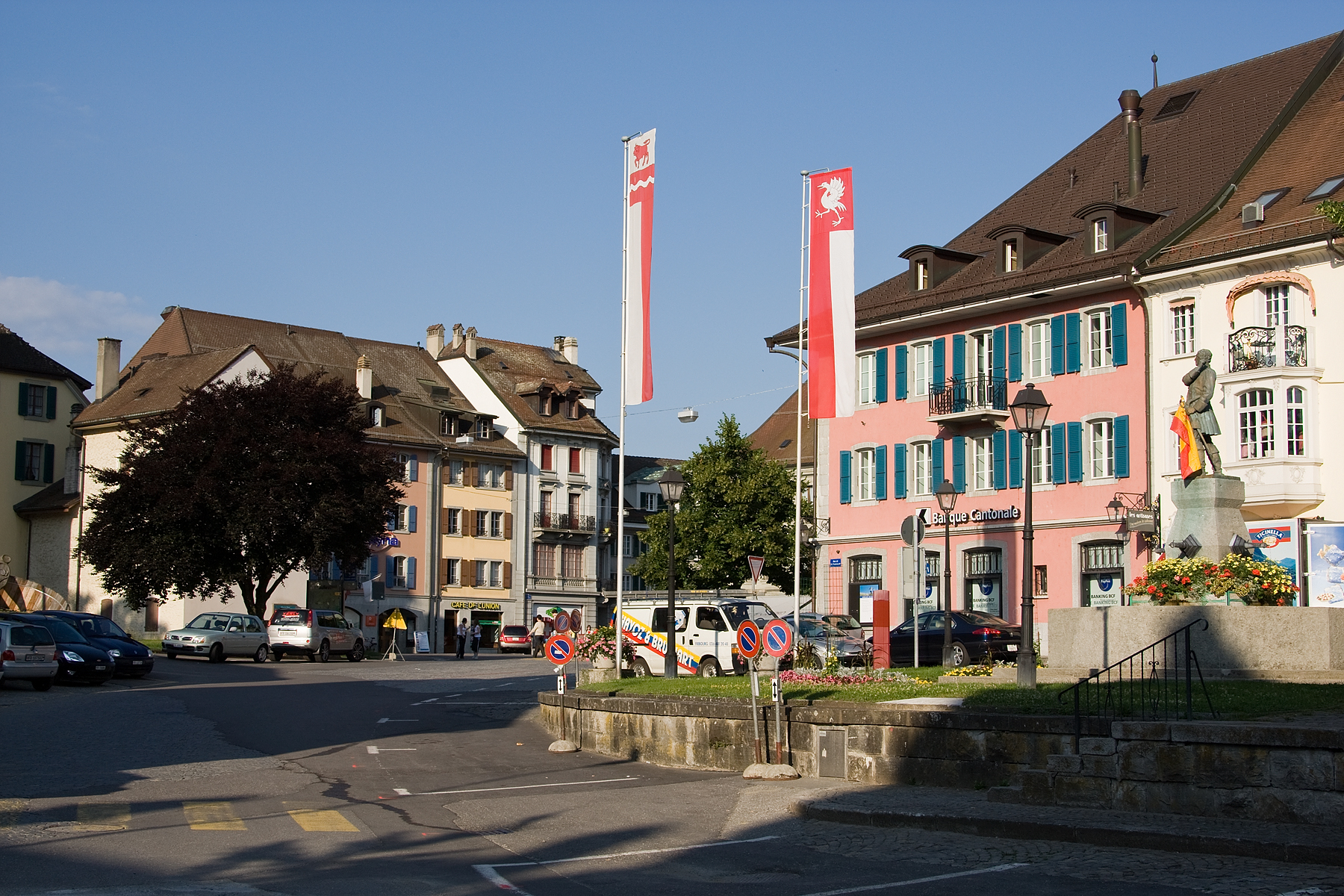

- Flag Coat of arms
- Location of Bulle
- Location within Switzerland Location within Canton of Fribourg
- Coordinates: 46°37′N 7°3′E
- Country: Switzerland
- Canton: Fribourg
- District: Gruyère

Government
  - Mayor: Syndic (list); Yves Menoud CVP/PDC (as of 2009)

Area
  - Total: 23.84 km^{2} (9.20 sq mi)
- Elevation: 771 m (2,530 ft)

Population (December 2020)
  - Total: 24,412
  - Density: 1,024/km^{2} (2,652/sq mi)
- Time zone: UTC+01:00 (CET)
  - Summer (DST): UTC+02:00 (CEST)
- Postal codes: 1630 Bulle, 1635 La Tour-de-Trême
- SFOS number: 2125
- ISO 3166 code: CH-FR
- Localities: Bulle, La Tour-de-Trême
- Surrounded by: Echarlens, Gruyères, Morlon, Le Pâquier-Montbarry, Riaz, Vuadens
- Website: www.bulle.ch

Bulle (French: [byl]; Arpitan: Bulo [ˈbylo]) is a municipality in the district of Gruyère in the canton of Fribourg in Switzerland. In January 2006 Bulle incorporated the formerly independent municipality of La Tour-de-Trême.

== History ==
=== Ancient times ===
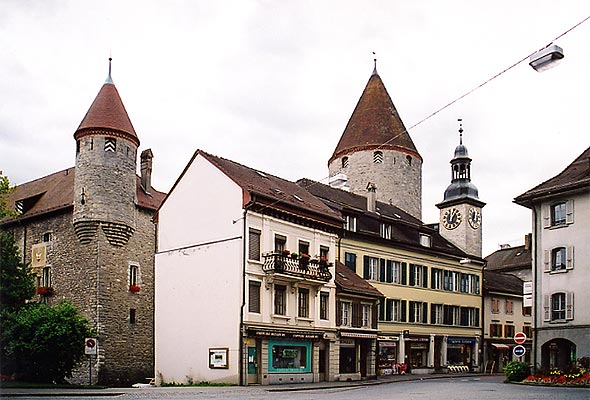
Houses and the castle in Bulle

Bulle is first mentioned in the 9th century as Butulum. In 1200 it was mentioned as Bollo. The municipality was formerly known by its German name Boll; however, that name is no longer used.

Very little is known about the early history of the Bulle area. In 1995, a large grave mound from the early Hallstatt period was partially excavated. The grave mound lies about 300 m (980 ft) from the hill on which the church was later built.

=== Middle ages ===
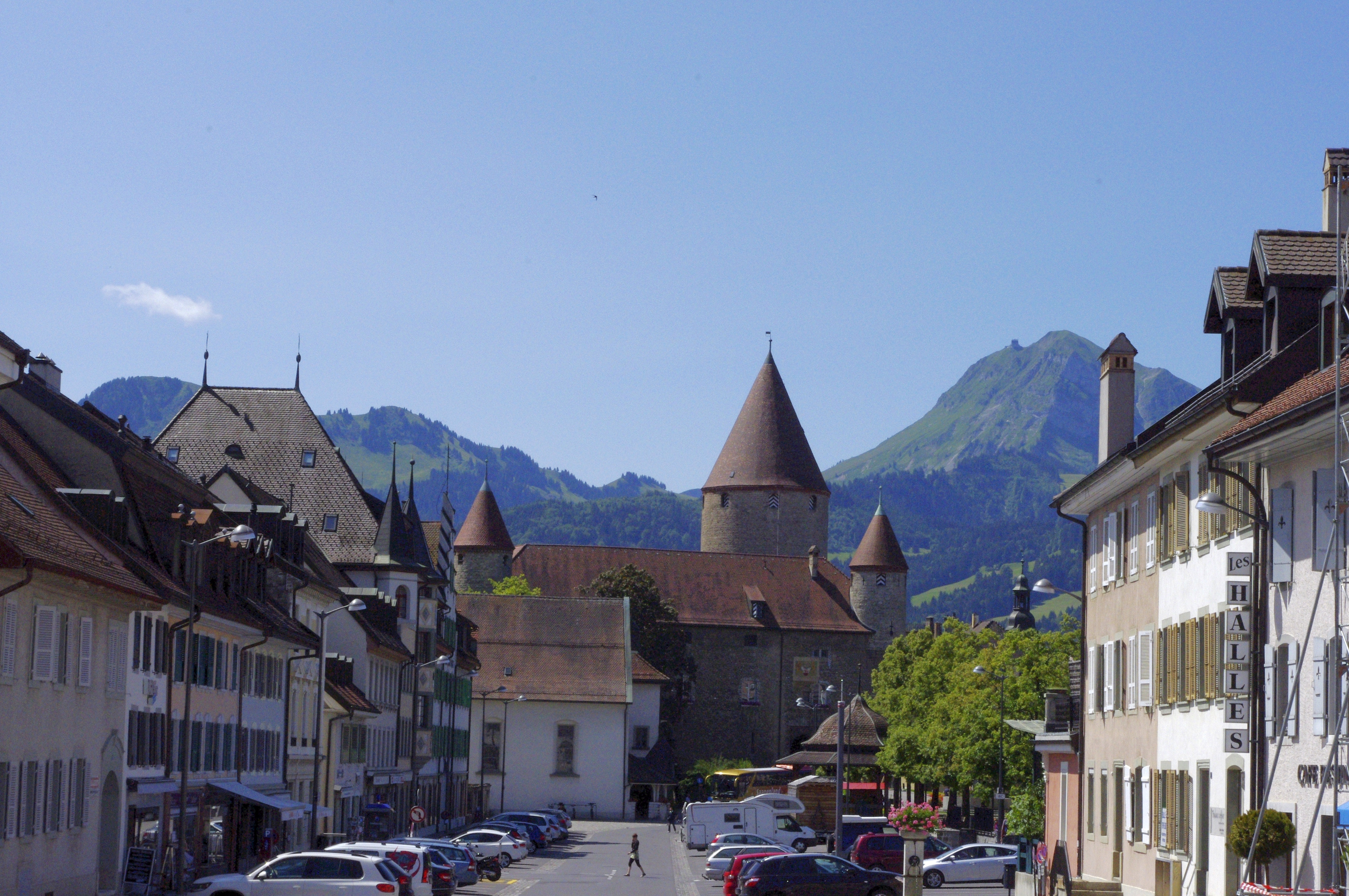
The old town of Bulle

During the Early Middle Ages it was the home of a parish church that covered a large parish. This Church of St. Eusebius was probably built in the 6th or 7th century by the Bishop of Lausanne. The church is mentioned several times between 852 and 875. In the 9th century, the parish was split into several independent parishes. As the parish shrunk in size, the church gradually lost its former importance, but it remained the center of the Decanate of Ogo until the 16th century. The deanery covered the whole Saanen valley to Treyvaux, the Jaun and Sionge valleys and extended west to Glâne. Bulle probably came under the secular power of the Bishop of Lausanne as early as the 6th century, and together with Avenches and Curtilles formed the territory originally owned by the bishop.

Since the counts of Gruyères also possessed sovereign rights in Bulle, there were numerous conflicts between the counts and the bishop in the 12th, 13th and 14th centuries. Since these conflicts were always decided in favor of the bishop, the counts eventually lost all rights in Bulle. Even by the 12th century, Bulle was an important regional economic center. In 1195/96, Count Rudolph closed the market in Gruyère and extended his support to the older market in Bulle. At that time, the town was a collection of homesteads, which surrounded a church and maybe had a castle near them. In the 13th century the bishops recognized that the town was crucial to their income and to administer and defend the surrounding region. Bishop Boniface erected a city wall surrounding a rectangular town with two lanes and four rows of houses in 1231–39. A little later, possibly under the episcopate of William de Champvent (1273–1301), the castle was built was in the southeast of the city. The main building of the castle was a 33-metre-high (108 ft) tower that dominated the south gate and the surrounding plain. Throughout the Middle Ages, the bishops appointed two officers, the castellan and the mayor to rule the town. Throughout the 13th to 15th centuries, the noble de Bulle family held the office of mayor. Although citizens of Bulle are mentioned in 1195/96, they first had an organization in the 14th century testifies. Starting at end of the 12th century, individual freedoms, rights and privileges were often conferred on the citizens of the town and in general the citizens of Bulle had the same privileges as citizens in Lausanne. Starting around 1350, many of the towns in the Saanen valley between Gruyere and Arconciel lost most of their historic importance and population. However, due to Bulle's favorable location, its infrastructure and the support of the bishops, it remained an important regional center. It was also able to recover quickly from a devastating fire in 1447.

==== Early modern era ====
A turning point in the Bulle's history was during the Burgundian Wars. On 16 January 1476 it entered into an alliance with the city of Fribourg. Due to the treaty, it was not plundered by the victorious Swiss after the Battle of Morat (22 June 1476). In 1536, as the Bernese conquered the Vaud, Bishop Sébastien de Montfalcon fled from Lausanne to Fribourg and placed himself and Bulle under the protection of that city. With Fribourg's protection, Bulle was able to remain Catholic. However, the protection of Fribourg was transformed into domination in 1537. The citizens were placed under a Fribourg appointed bailiff who ruled over the former episcopal lands from the castle in Bulle.

The period from 1536 to 1798 was reasonably quiet. The town expanded slightly beyond the city walls near the upper gate. While it was politically powerless, it became an economic center for cheese production and trade. It was the hub for most cheeses that were exported to France. In the 17th century the chapel and the statue erected in her (Notre-Dame-de-Pitié or de Compassion) became a pilgrimage destination. In 1665 the Capuchins took over the property, enlarged and embellished the chapel and built convent buildings on the site of the hospital. The hospital moved to the vicinity of the upper gate. The shrine attracted many pilgrims from the Counties of Burgundy and Savoy. In the 18th century, its popularity began to slowly wane. In 1750-51 a new building replaced the parish church of Saint-Pierre-aux-Liens, which had become too small. In 1763–1768, the bailiff's quarters and the audience hall in the castle were expanded and renovated.

==== 18th century to present ====
Starting at the end of the 18th century, Bulle became important in the cantonal government. Pierre-Nicolas Chenaux, who led a popular uprising against the Ancien Régime government in Fribourg in 1781, held meetings before the uprising in Bulle. After the failure of the uprising, several members of the movement went into exile in Paris and founded the Helvétique Club. During the 1798 French invasion many of the residents of Bulle joined the revolutionary cause. By 26 January, a liberty tree was raised in front of the castle and the citizens had selected an oversight committee and drove the governor out of the city. Bulle would have gladly joined the French-supported Lemanic Republic, but after the march elections it became part of the Helvetic Republic's Canton of Fribourg. Under Fribourg, the town of Gruyères was chosen as the seat of the district, instead of Bulle. Bulle also became deeply indebted during the French occupation of 1798–1802. It became a staging post for troops marching from the north into Italy and had to pay for both troops stationed in Bulle as well as troops marching through its lands.

On 2 April 1805 an enormous fire destroyed almost the entire city. It was quickly rebuilt, and most of the medieval streets were retained. However, one of the four rows of houses was not rebuilt to make room for a large marketplace. The town granary was quickly rebuilt, followed by the town hall in 1808, and the rebuilt church in 1816.

During the entire 19th century Bulle was often in sharp opposition to the conservative cantonal government during the Restoration (1814–1830). They supported a liberal cantonal constitution during the Regeneration movement that prevailed in 1831. After 1840 the Conservatives gained back power in the cantonal government, which gave new impetus to the radical opposition, and Bulle was one of its most important centers. In January 1847 there was an open rebellion in Bulle. On 6 January 1847 the mayor was imprisoned in the castle. Three days later, on 9 January, an armed group marched from Bulle toward Fribourg, but returned to the town when they were only half way there. Following the Sonderbund War, (brief civil war where a group of cantons unhappy with domination by Bern attempted to leave the Swiss Confederation and were stopped by a Federal army) the new Cantonal Constitution of 1848 made Bulle the capital of the Gruyère district. During the 1853 elections, which punished the radicals for their political excesses, the city was the scene of violence. Violent clashes in Bulle between radicals and conservatives lasted the entire 19th century. At the same time both parties were trying to distinguish themselves with ambitious projects. The radicals built a rail line between Bulle and Romont, established the Banque Populaire de la Gruyère in 1853, opened the radical La Gruyère newspaper in 1882, and in 1893 constructed their own electric company. The Conservatives opened the "Le Fribourgeois" paper in 1867, established the Crédit Gruyérien bank in 1867, and built the Chemins de fer de la Gruyère électriques in 1903–1912.

Aerial view (1954)

From the mid-19th century to 1970, the Radical party possessed a majority in the town council, while the Conservatives were always in the minority. In 1948, the Socialists gained two seats, which they lost in 1950, but won again in 1958 and 1966. Between 1970 and 1996 the council consisted of four Radicals, three Socialists and Social Democrats, and two Christian Democrats. During the Second World War, Bulle was the site of a major riot, the Bulle Riot. On 23 November 1944, five federal inspectors, who were investigating the illicit trade in meat, were attacked by a mob and forced to flee to the castle (which was the district administration building) for safety. In October 1945 the Federal Court met in Fribourg, and in the presence of the entire Swiss press handed down fourteen convictions for the rioters.

== Geography ==
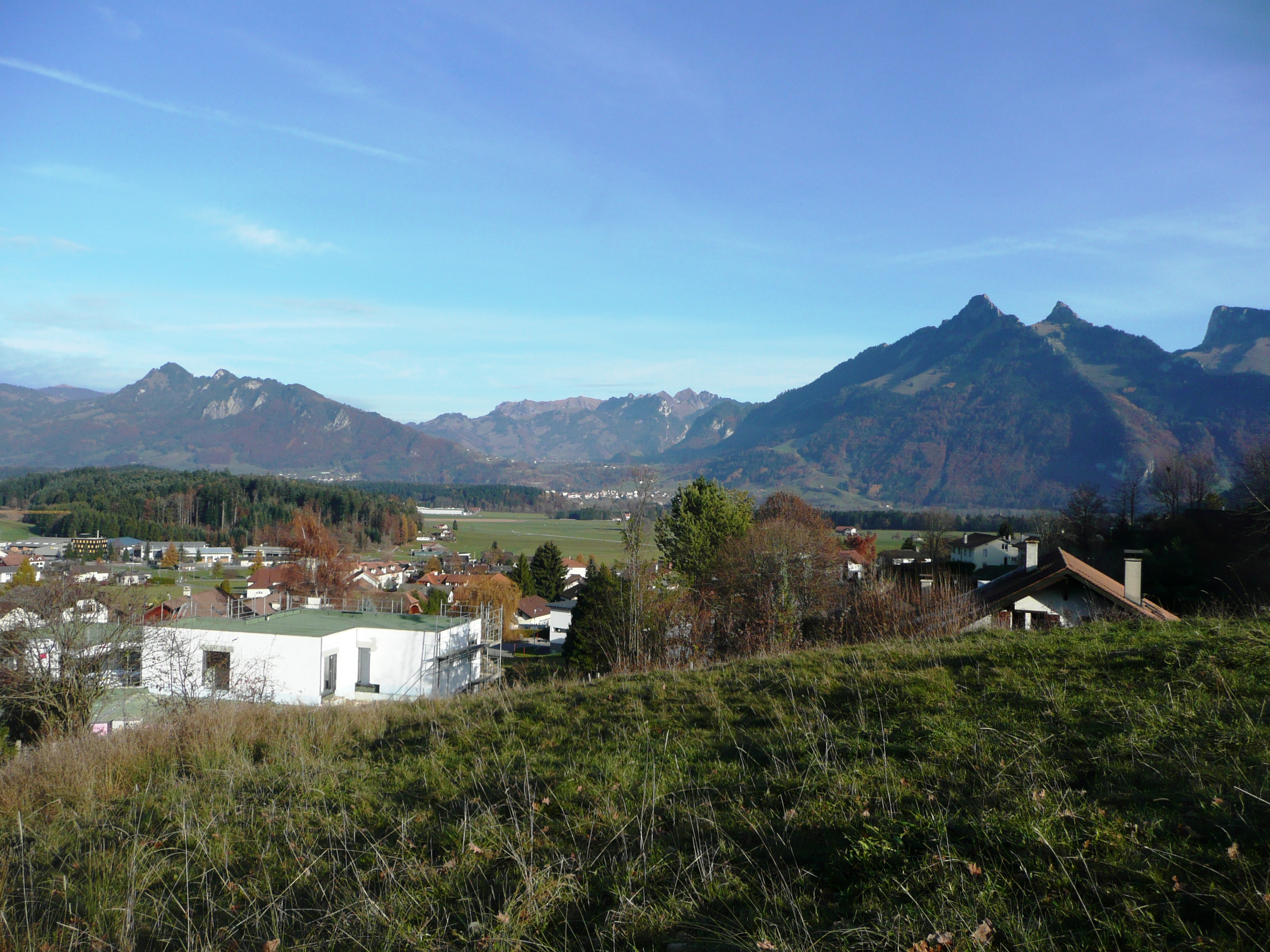
View from Le Pâquier-Montbarry, near Bulle

Bulle has an area, as of 2013, of 23.86 square kilometers (9.21 mi^{2}). Of this area, 10.03 km^{2} (3.87 mi^{2}) or 42.0% is used for agricultural purposes, while 7.55 km^{2} (2.92 mi^{2}) or 31.6% is forested. Of the rest of the land, 6.04 km^{2} (2.33 mi^{2}) or 25.3% is settled (buildings or roads), 0.14 km^{2} (0.054 mi^{2}) or 0.6% is either rivers or lakes and 0.08 km^{2} (20 acres) or 0.3% is unproductive land.

Of the built up area, industrial buildings made up 4.0% of the total area while housing and buildings made up 12.5% and transportation infrastructure made up 6.5%. Power and water infrastructure as well as other special developed areas made up 1.3% of the area. Out of the forested land, 30.2% of the total land area is heavily forested and 1.5% is covered with orchards or small clusters of trees. Of the agricultural land, 10.1% is used for growing crops and 20.6% is pastures and 11.3% is used for alpine pastures. All the water in the municipality is flowing water.

The municipality is the capital of the Gruyère district. It is located on a hill at an elevation of 770 meters (2,530 ft) above the left side of the Trême river.

== Coat of arms ==
The blazon of the municipal coat of arms is Per fess Argent an Ox Gules passant and Gules.

== Demographics ==
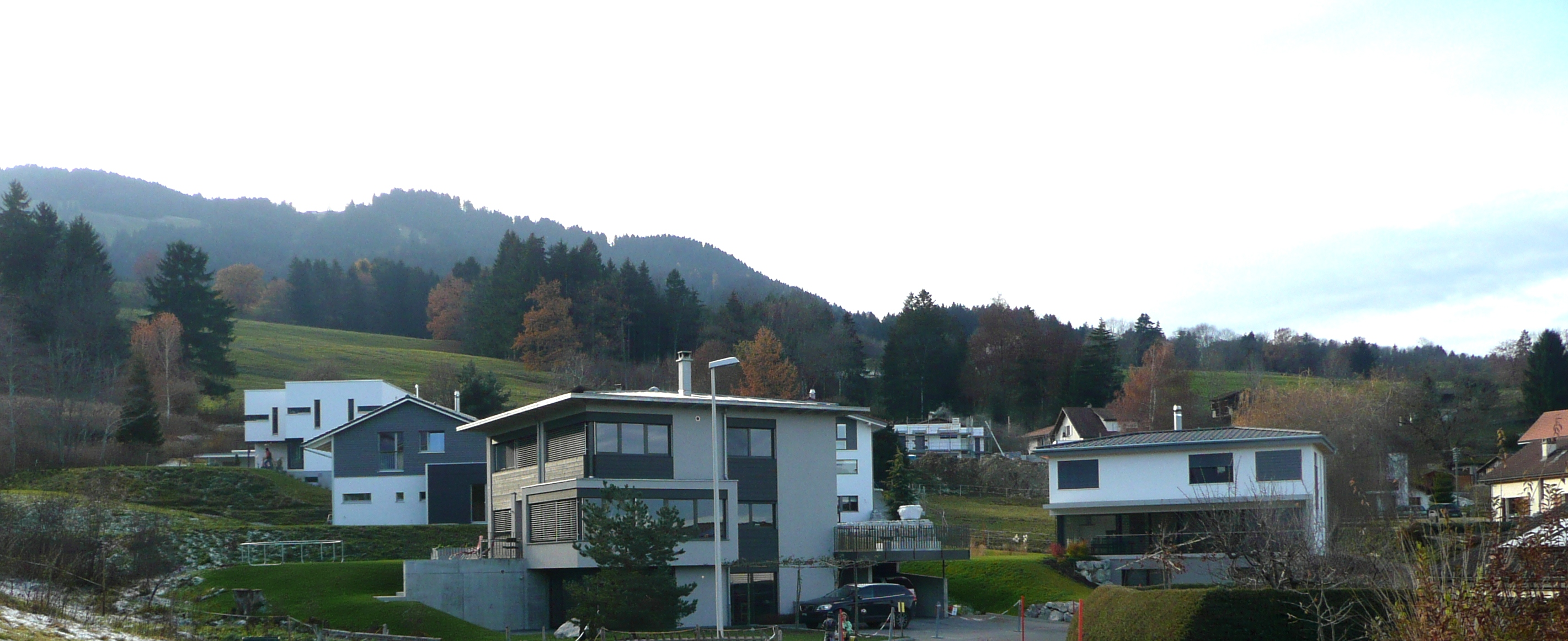
Modern homes in Le Pâquier, near Bulle

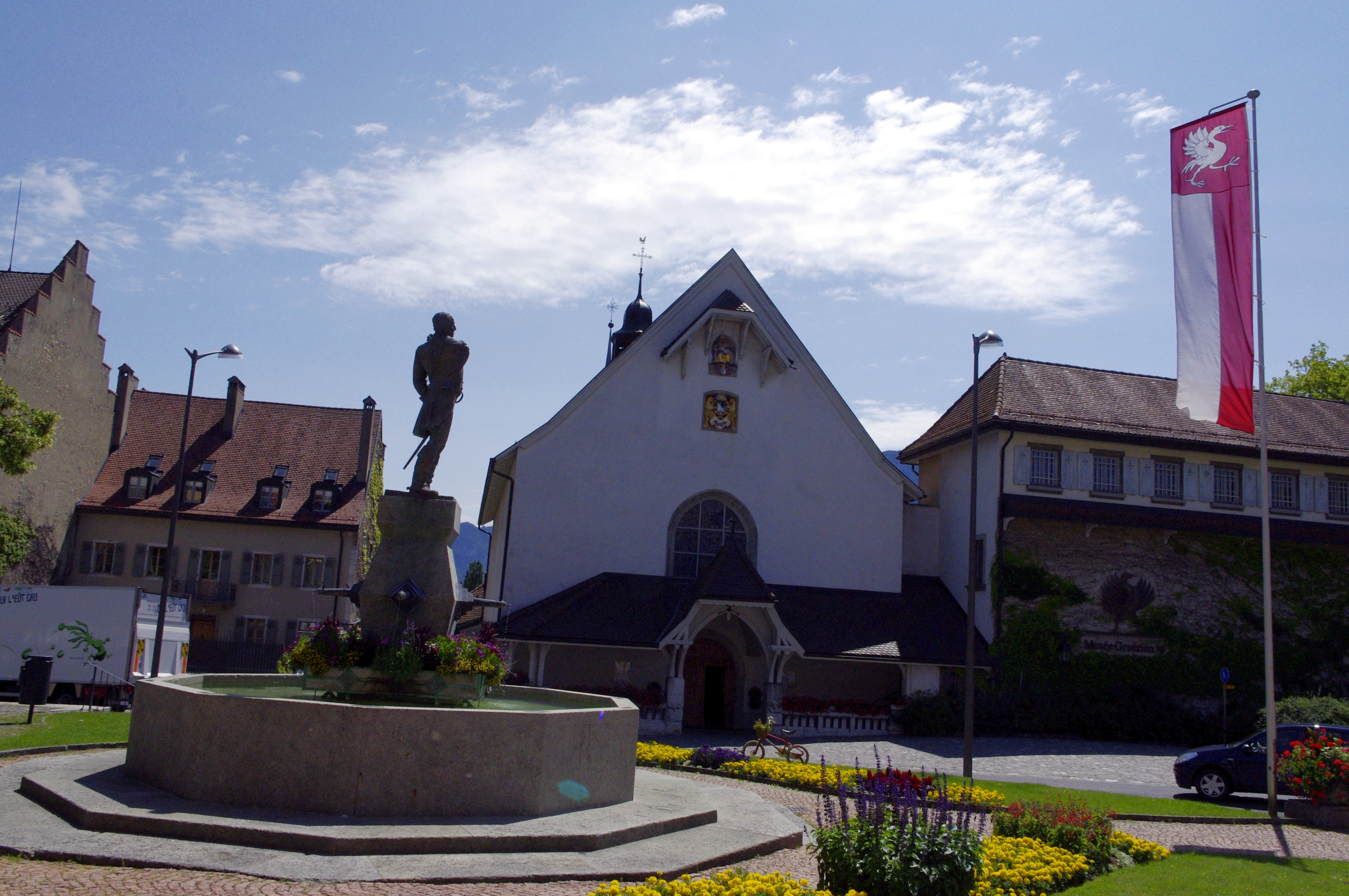
Fountain and green space in the old town of Bulle

Bulle has a population (as of December 2020) of 24,412. As of 2008, 29.8% of the population are resident foreign nationals. Over the last 10 years (2000–2010) the population has changed at a rate of 27.2%. Migration accounted for 24.2%, while births and deaths accounted for 3.8%.

Most of the population (as of 2000) speaks French (9,492 or 85.1%) as their first language, Portuguese is the second most common (488 or 4.4%) and German is the third (345 or 3.1%). There are 125 people who speak Italian and 2 people who speak Romansh.

As of 2008, the population was 48.6% male and 51.4% female. The population was made up of 5,693 Swiss men (31.2% of the population) and 3,185 (17.4%) non-Swiss men. There were 6,605 Swiss women (36.1%) and 2,790 (15.3%) non-Swiss women. Of the population in the municipality, 2,917 or about 26.2% were born in Bulle and lived there in 2000. There were 3,896 or 34.9% who were born in the same canton, while 1,227 or 11.0% were born somewhere else in Switzerland, and 2,642 or 23.7% were born outside of Switzerland.

As of 2000, children and teenagers (0–19 years old) make up 25.3% of the population, while adults (20–64 years old) make up 60.5% and seniors (over 64 years old) make up 14.2%.

As of 2000, there were 4,730 people who were single and never married in the municipality. There were 5,034 married individuals, 798 widows or widowers and 587 individuals who are divorced.

As of 2000, there were 6,000 private households in the municipality, and an average of 2.3 persons per household. There were 1,575 households that consist of only one person and 311 households with five or more people. In 2000, a total of 4,502 apartments (89.5% of the total) were permanently occupied, while 373 apartments (7.4%) were seasonally occupied and 155 apartments (3.1%) were empty. As of 2009, the construction rate of new housing units was 13.1 new units per 1000 residents.

As of 2003 the average price to rent an average apartment in Bulle was 1026.06 Swiss francs (CHF) per month (US$820, £460, €660 approx. exchange rate from 2003). The average rate for a one-room apartment was 514.78 CHF (US$410, £230, €330), a two-room apartment was about 731.83 CHF (US$590, £330, €470), a three-room apartment was about 940.67 CHF (US$750, £420, €600) and a six or more room apartment cost an average of 1525.37 CHF (US$1220, £690, €980). The average apartment price in Bulle was 91.9% of the national average of 1116 CHF. The vacancy rate for the municipality, in 2010, was 1.18%.

The historical population is given in the following chart:

== Heritage sites of national significance ==
The Notre-Dame De Compassion Chapel, the Baillival Castle, the Halle Landi and the Gruérien Museum are listed as Swiss heritage site of national significance. The entire old town of Bulle is part of the Inventory of Swiss Heritage Sites.

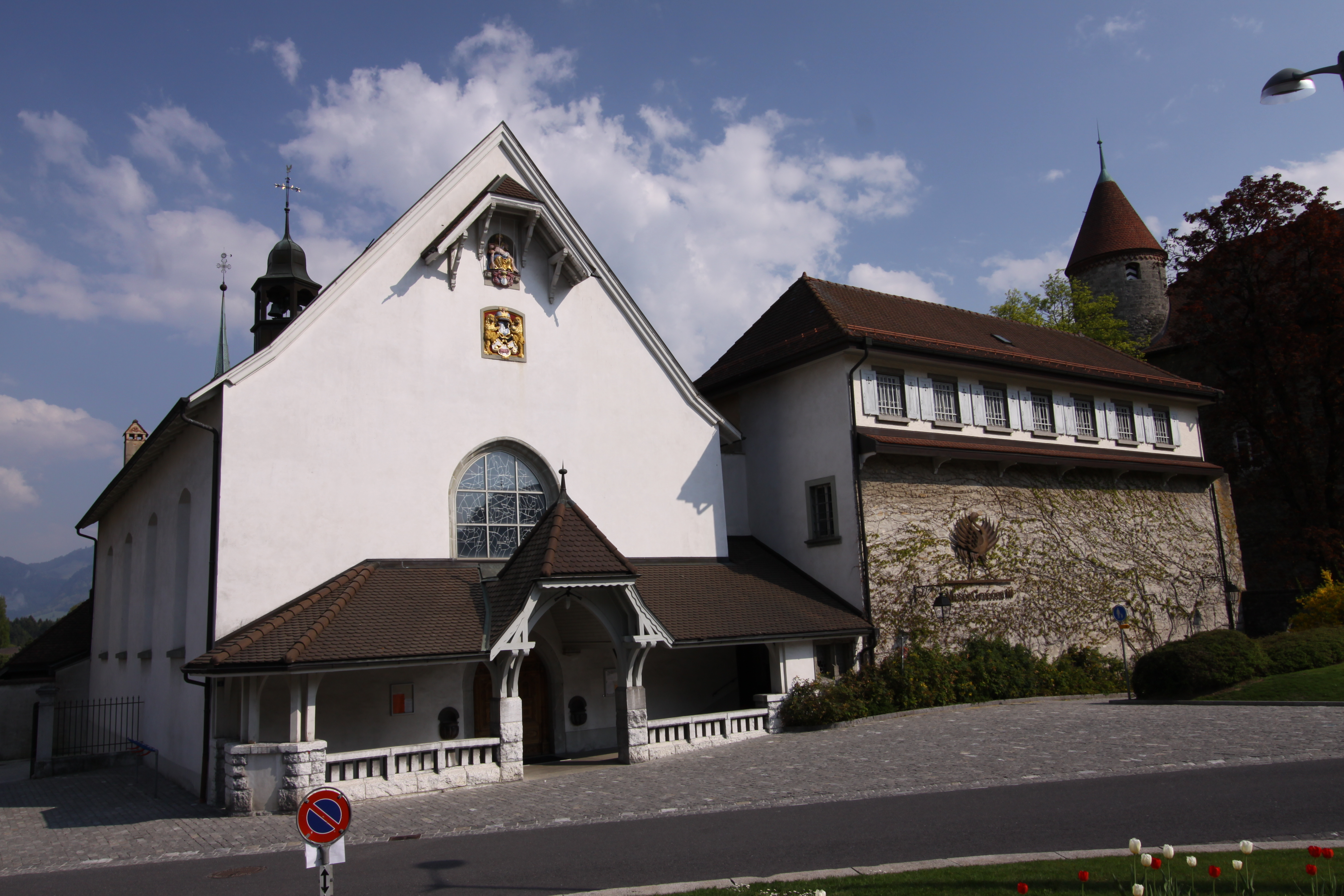
Notre-Dame De Compassion Chapel

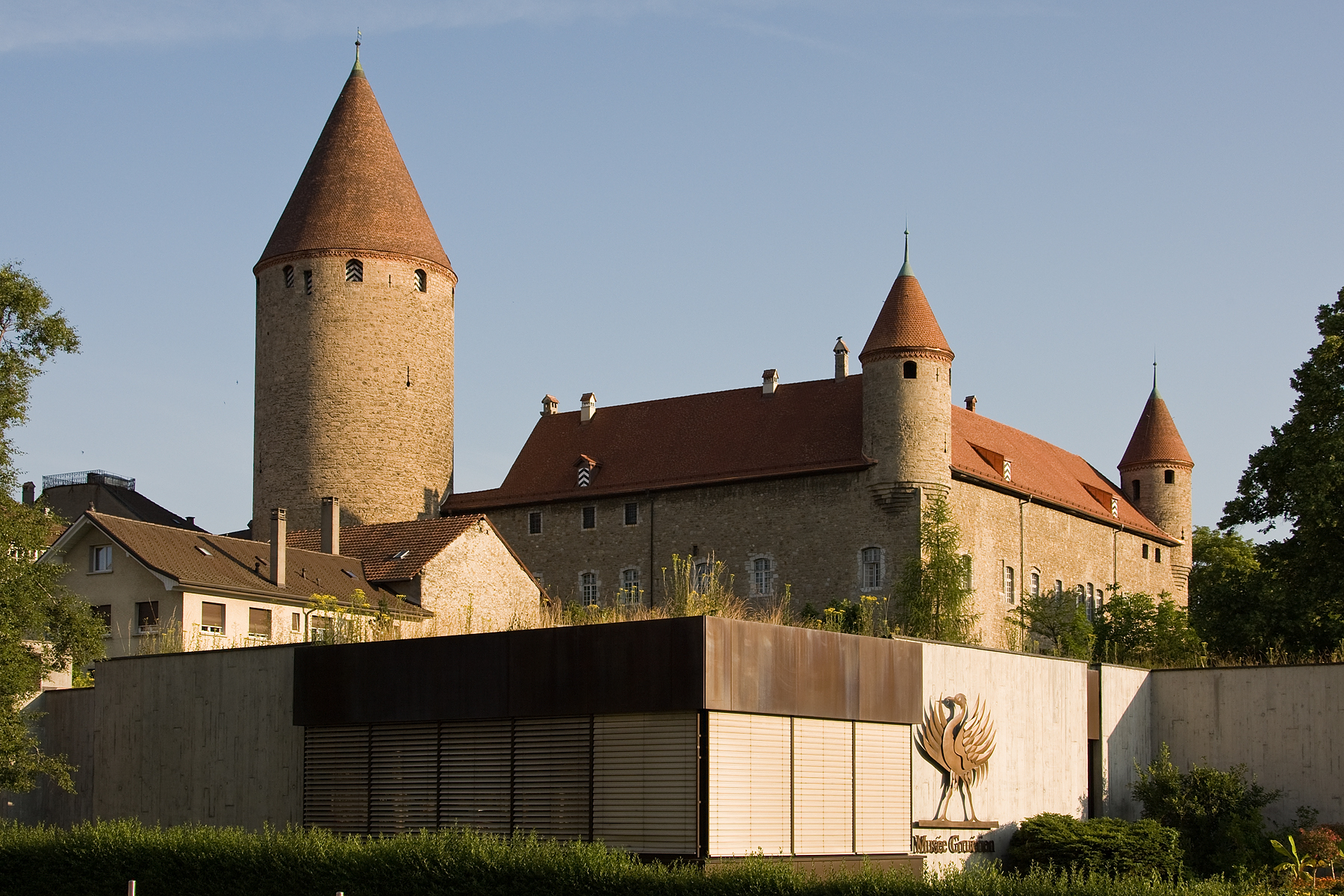
Baillival Castle

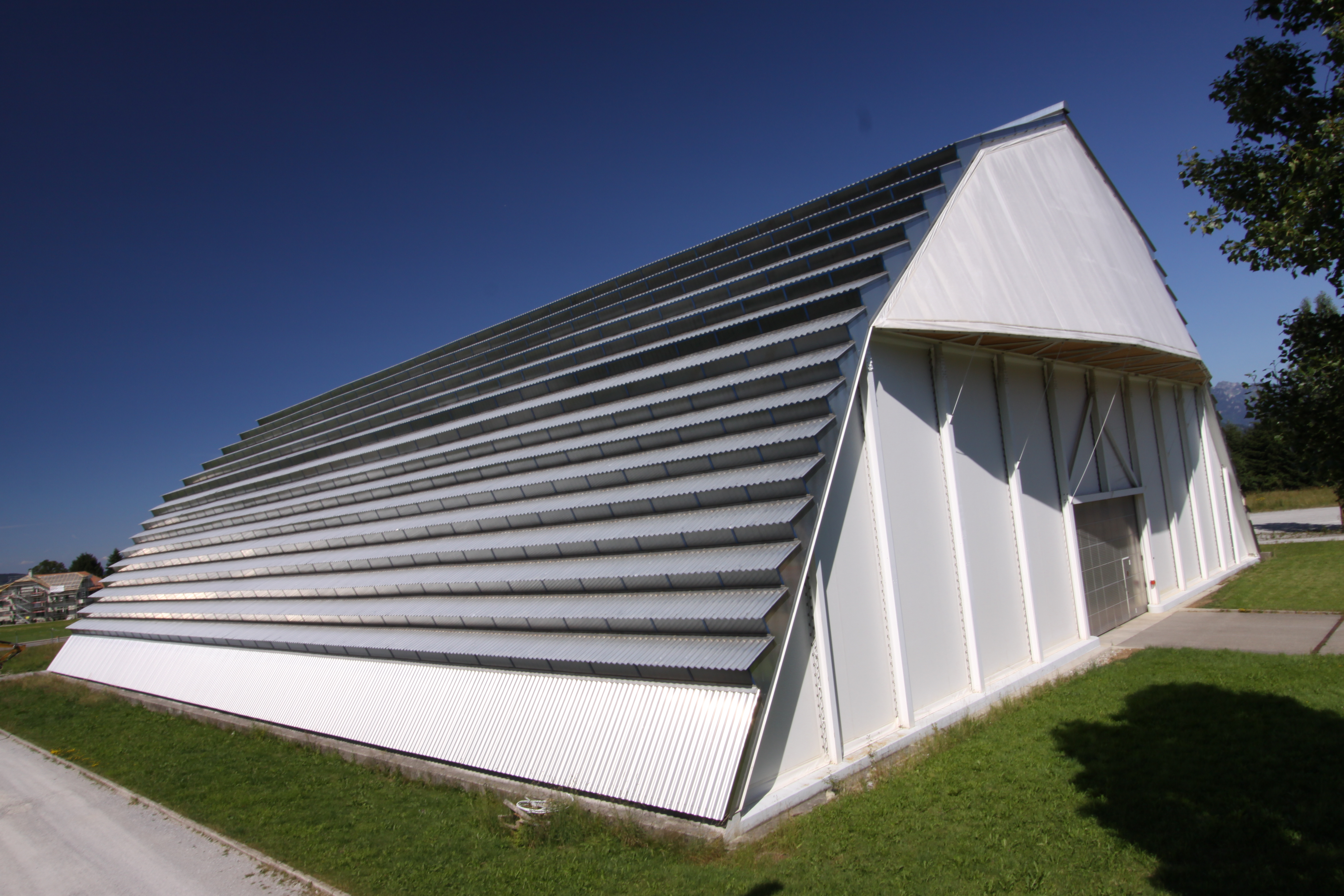
Halle Landi

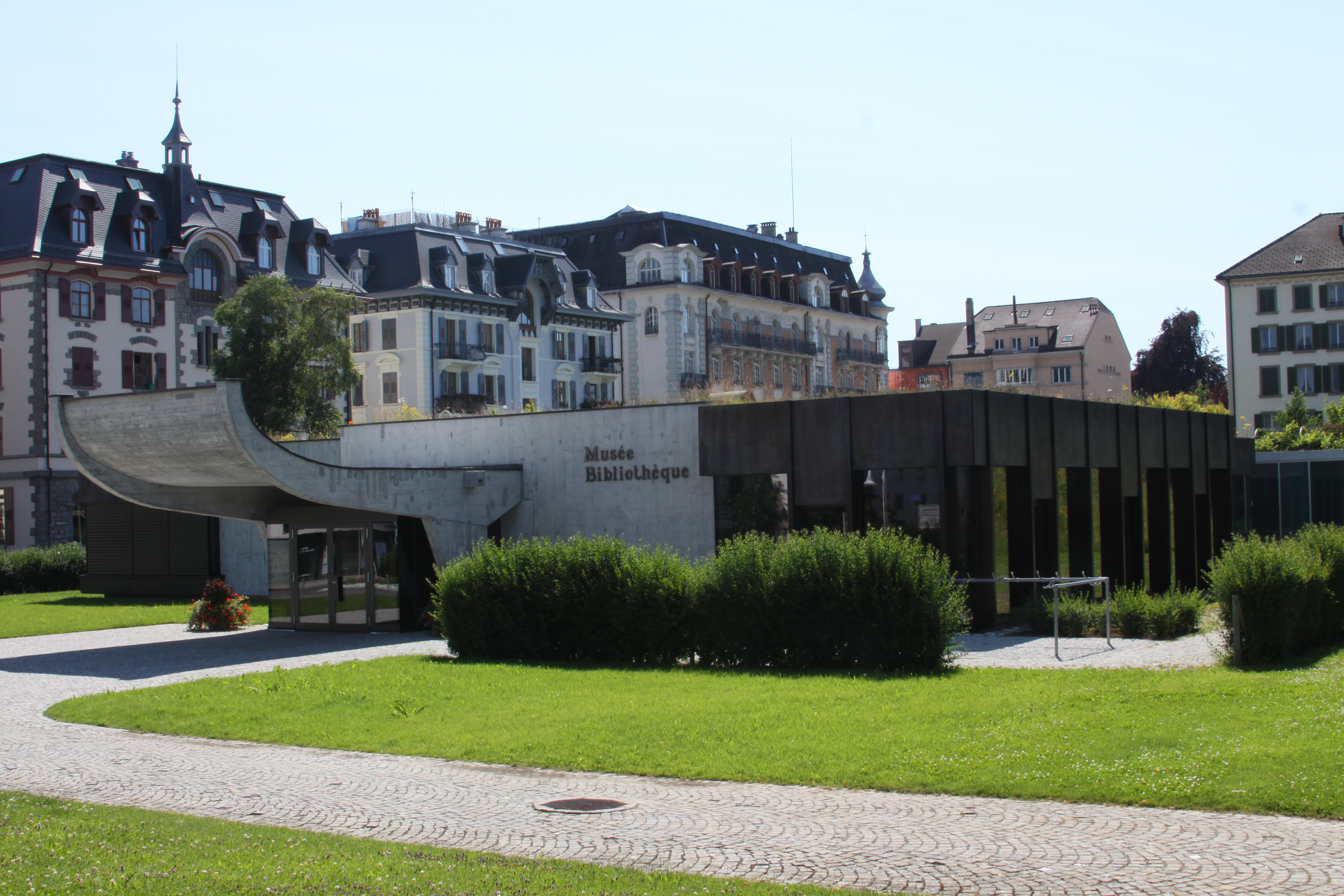
Gruérien Museum

=== Sights ===
Downtown Bulle is made up of many shops and offices, a train/bus station (TPF) (with regular service to nearby Fribourg), and an old château that was converted into a prison. A sculpture of a bull sits in a traffic circle by the bus station, showing the emblematic animal for which Bulle is named.

== Politics ==
In the 2011 federal election the most popular party was the SP which received 32.8% of the vote. The next three most popular parties were the SVP (18.6%), the CVP (16.9%) and the FDP (16.2%).

The SPS gained an additional 5.1% of the vote from the 2007 Federal election (27.6% in 2007 vs 32.8% in 2011). The SVP moved from third in 2007 (with 21.6%) to second in 2011, the CVP moved from second in 2007 (with 22.0%) to third and the FDP retained about the same popularity (18.2% in 2007). A total of 4,617 votes were cast in this election, of which 128 or 2.8% were invalid.

== Economy ==
As of 2010, Bulle had an unemployment rate of 4.9%. As of 2008, there were 74 people employed in the primary economic sector and about 22 businesses involved in this sector. 3,932 people were employed in the secondary sector and there were 167 businesses in this sector. 6,381 people were employed in the tertiary sector, with 737 businesses in this sector. There were 5,480 residents of the municipality who were employed in some capacity, of which females made up 45.1% of the workforce.

In 2008 the total number of full-time equivalent jobs was 8,850. The number of jobs in the primary sector was 56, of which 49 were in agriculture and 6 were in forestry or lumber production. The number of jobs in the secondary sector was 3,784 of which 2,411 or (63.7%) were in manufacturing, 5 or (0.1%) were in mining and 1,250 (33.0%) were in construction. The number of jobs in the tertiary sector was 5,010. In the tertiary sector; 1,631 or 32.6% were in wholesale or retail sales or the repair of motor vehicles, 319 or 6.4% were in the movement and storage of goods, 452 or 9.0% were in a hotel or restaurant, 70 or 1.4% were in the information industry, 472 or 9.4% were the insurance or financial industry, 517 or 10.3% were technical professionals or scientists, 471 or 9.4% were in education and 492 or 9.8% were in health care.

In 2000, there were 4,927 workers who commuted into the municipality and 2,232 workers who commuted away. The municipality is a net importer of workers, with about 2.2 workers entering the municipality for every one leaving. Of the working population, 8% used public transportation to get to work, and 66.1% used a private car.

== Transportation ==
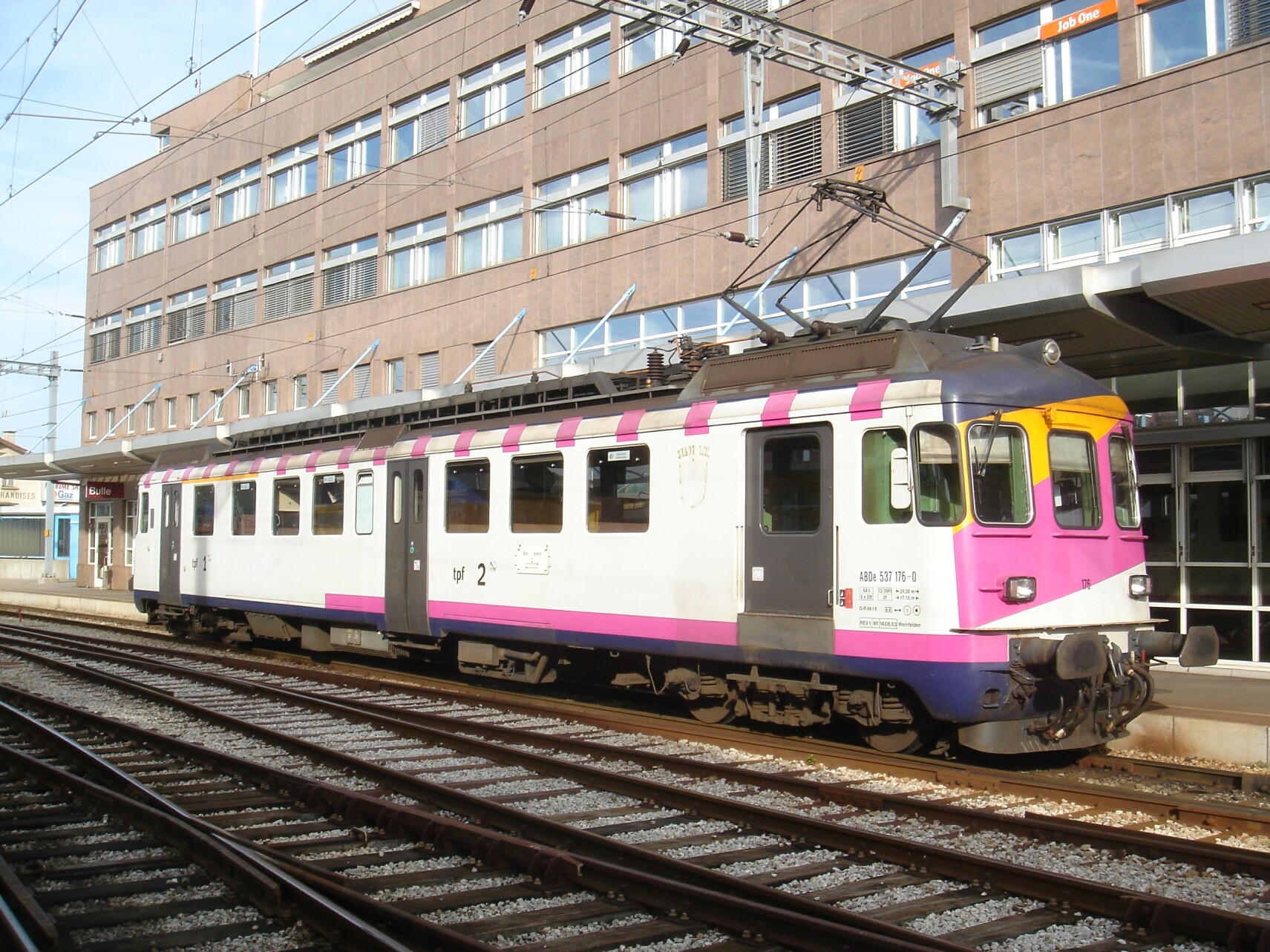
Bulle train station

Bulle is the centre of operations of the former Chemins de fer fribourgeois Gruyère–Fribourg–Morat network, now managed by Transports publics Fribourgeois. At Bulle are the administrative headquarters, workshops, and, within its modern transportation hub and station, connections between meter and standard gauge lines as well as to many bus lines. Transfer to the wide-ranging trains of the Montreux-Oberland Bernois (Panorama Express) takes place at nearby Montbovon, which provides a convenient connection for travelers from Montreux to the Gruyère line's popular Chocolate Express.

== Religion ==
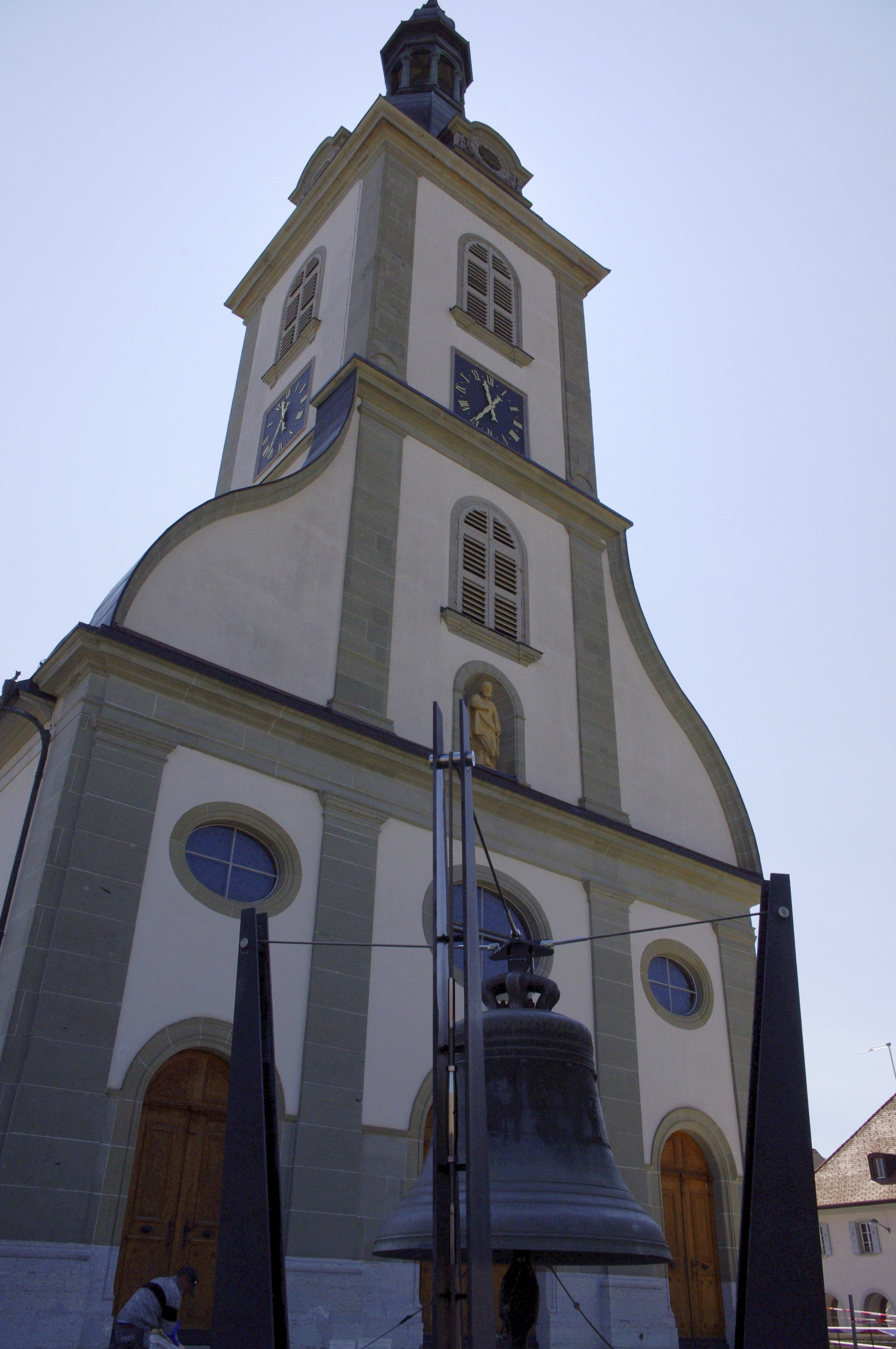
Saint-Pierre-aux-Liens Church

From the 2000 census, 8,436 or 75.7% were Roman Catholic, while 625 or 5.6% belonged to the Swiss Reformed Church. Of the rest of the population, there were 54 members of an Orthodox church (or about 0.48% of the population), there were 8 individuals (or about 0.07% of the population) who belonged to the Christian Catholic Church, and there were 246 individuals (or about 2.21% of the population) who belonged to another Christian church. There were 10 individuals (or about 0.09% of the population) who were Jewish, and 701 (or about 6.29% of the population) who were Islamic. There were 51 individuals who were Buddhist, 12 individuals who were Hindu and 11 individuals who belonged to another church. 579 (or about 5.19% of the population) belonged to no church, are agnostic or atheist, and 538 individuals (or about 4.83% of the population) did not answer the question.

== Education ==
In Bulle about 3,207 or (28.8%) of the population have completed non-mandatory upper secondary education, and 1,134 or (10.2%) have completed additional higher education (either university or a Fachhochschule). Of the 1,134 who completed tertiary schooling, 57.4% were Swiss men, 25.7% were Swiss women, 10.1% were non-Swiss men and 6.9% were non-Swiss women.

The Canton of Fribourg school system provides one year of non-obligatory Kindergarten, followed by six years of Primary school. This is followed by three years of obligatory lower Secondary school where the students are separated according to ability and aptitude. Following the lower Secondary students may attend a three or four year optional upper Secondary school. The upper Secondary school is divided into gymnasium (university preparatory) and vocational programs. After they finish the upper Secondary program, students may choose to attend a Tertiary school or continue their apprenticeship.

During the 2010–11 school year, there were a total of 6,205 students attending 325 classes in Bulle. A total of 3,029 students from the municipality attended any school, either in the municipality or outside of it. There were 11 kindergarten classes with a total of 193 students in the municipality. The municipality had 58 primary classes and 1,243 students. During the same year, there were 84 lower secondary classes with a total of 1,682 students. There were 79 vocational upper Secondary classes and were 47 upper Secondary classes, with 938 upper Secondary students and 1,166 vocational upper Secondary students The municipality had 18 specialized Tertiary classes and were 28 non-university Tertiary classes, with 838 non-university Tertiary students and 145 specialized Tertiary students.

As of 2000, there were 1,680 students in Bulle who came from another municipality, while 200 residents attended schools outside the municipality.

Bulle is home to the Bibliothèque de Bulle library. The library has (as of 2008) 78,000 books or other media, and loaned out 131,270 items in the same year. It was open a total of 260 days with average of 31 hours per week during that year.

== Football ==
FC Bulle is the municipality's football club.

== Notable people ==
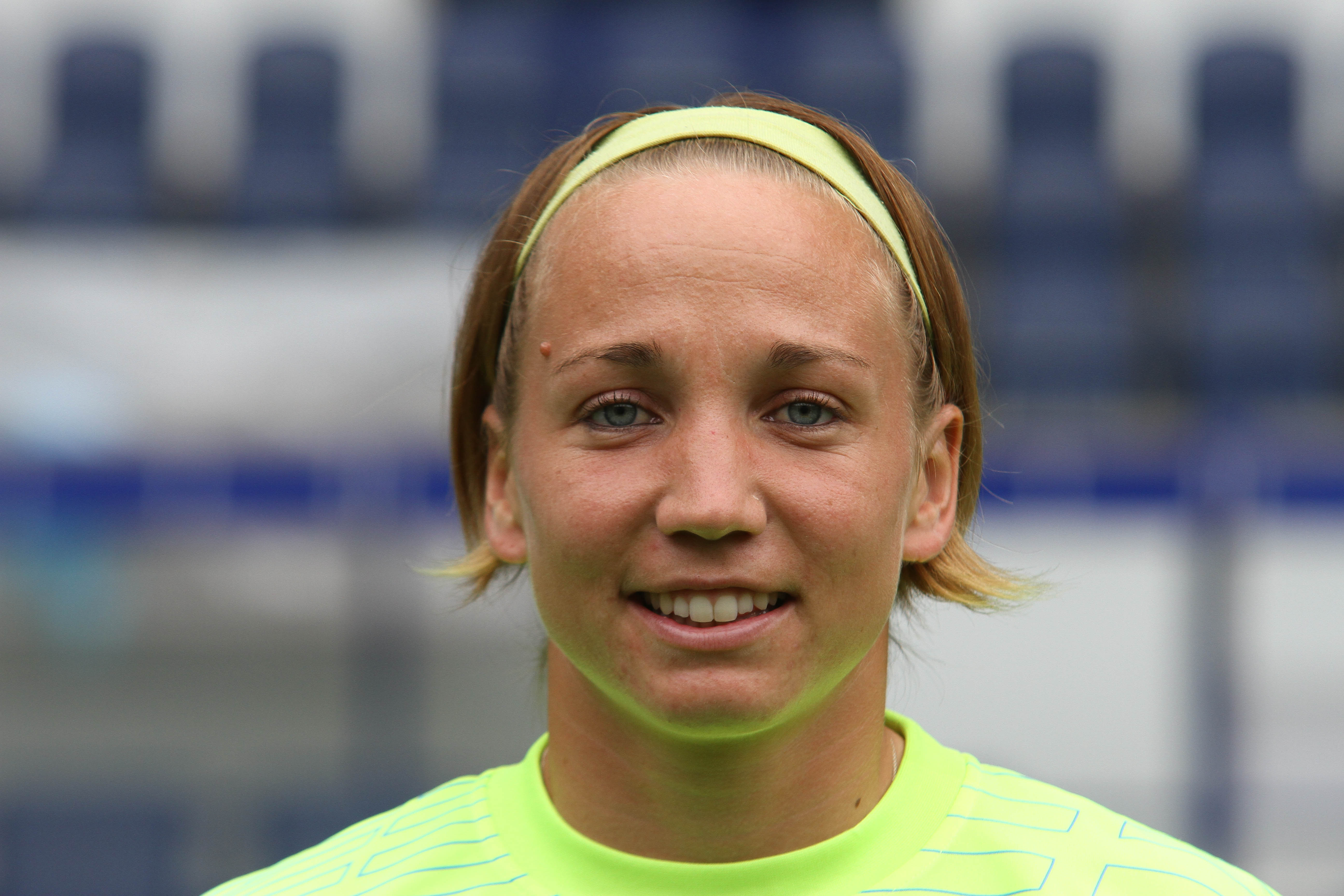
Gaëlle Thalmann, 2014

- Jean Crotti (1878–1958), a French painter, preferred orphism
- Isolde Liebherr (born 1949), German-Swiss entrepreneur and vice chairman of Liebherr Group
- Erhard Loretan (1959–2011), mountain climber
- Christina Liebherr (born 1979), equestrian, show jumper, bronze medallist at the 2008 Summer Olympics
- Jean-François Cuennet (born 1961), ski mountaineer, long-distance runner and mountain biker
- Gaëlle Thalmann (born 1986), football goalkeeper
- Jason Dupasquier (2001–2021), racing motorcyclist
