= Vauderens =

Former municipality, canton of Fribourg

- Former municipality
- Aerial view of Vauderens, 1964
- Location of Vauderens
- Location within Switzerland Location within Canton of Fribourg
- Coordinates: 46.616667°N 6.850003°E
- Country: Switzerland
- Canton: Fribourg
- District: Glâne
- Municipality: Ursy

Population (2000)
  - Total: 462
- Time zone: UTC+01:00 (CET)
  - Summer (DST): UTC+02:00 (CEST)
- ISO 3166 code: CH-FR
- Website

Vauderens is a former municipality in the Glâne district of the canton of Fribourg, Switzerland. Since 2001 it has been part of the municipality of Ursy, together with Bionnens and Mossel. It is a scattered settlement on the right bank of the upper Broye valley.

== History ==
Vauderens is first mentioned in the 12th century as Vualdenens. Guilelmus de Vualdenens is named as a witness in a deed of Hauterive Abbey before 1173. From the 14th to the 16th century the lords of Prez and the Maillardoz family of Rue shared the tithe of Vauderens. In the Middle Ages Vauderens was part of the Savoyard castellany of Rue; it was then attached to the Fribourg bailiwick of Rue (1536–1798), to the district of the same name in 1798 and to the Glâne district in 1848. The first municipal statutes date from 1785. In church matters, Vauderens has always belonged to the parish of Morlens, whose seat was moved to Ursy in 1869.

Settlement grew denser around the station on the Lausanne–Bern railway line (1862). Between 1997 and 2000 the Vauderens railway tunnel was rebuilt and enlarged, and the route between Vauderens and Siviriez was changed. The school dates from 1892. An organ-building workshop existed from 1985 to 2006. Traditionally agricultural (with a cooperative society from 1898), Vauderens has seen residential development.

Vauderens had 20 hearths (households) in 1278 and 5 in 1359, and 205 inhabitants in 1850, 284 in 1900, 263 in 1950 and 462 in 2000. In 2001 it became part of Ursy.

== Bibliography ==
- N. Morard, "La population d'une châtellenie savoyarde à la fin du Moyen Age", in Pro Fribourg, 1999, no. 122, pp. 47–66
