= Arlens =

Hamlet in the canton of Fribourg

- Hamlet
- Location within Switzerland Location within Canton of Fribourg
- Coordinates: 46.60533°N 6.833366°E
- Country: Switzerland
- Canton: Fribourg
- Municipality: Rue

Arlens is a hamlet and former lordship in the canton of Fribourg, Switzerland. It is part of the former municipality of Blessens, which has belonged to the municipality of Rue since 1993.

== History ==
Arlens is first mentioned in 1162 as Aslens, and in 1251 as Allens. Together with Blessens it belongs to the parish of Promasens.

The lordship was held by the lords of Prez from the 12th century. In 1403 it was a fief of Savoy and was in the hands of Jean de Prez, Mermet Maillardoz of Rue, and Antoine Champion, lord of Vaulruz. Administratively it was attached to the lordship of Rue, into which it was gradually absorbed. In 1516 Georges Maillardoz was co-lord (coseigneur) of Arlens. In 1536 Arlens passed, together with Rue, to Fribourg. In 1784 the fief of Arlens, together with the tithe of Invau, passed to Julia Katharina May von Hünigen.

== Bibliography ==
- P. Champoud, Les droits seigneuriaux dans le Pays de Vaud d'après les reconnaissances reçues par Jean Balay de 1403 à 1409, 1963, 18–19, 120
