= Promasens =

Former municipality, canton of Fribourg

- Former municipality
- Church of Saints Peter and Paul
- Location of Promasens
- Location within Switzerland Location within Canton of Fribourg
- Coordinates: 46.600001°N 6.816669°E
- Country: Switzerland
- Canton: Fribourg
- District: Glâne
- Municipality: Rue

Population (2000)
  - Total: 246
- Time zone: UTC+01:00 (CET)
  - Summer (DST): UTC+02:00 (CEST)
- ISO 3166 code: CH-FR
- Website

Promasens (old German name Promasing) is a former municipality in the Glâne district of the canton of Fribourg, Switzerland, in the valley of the upper Broye. Since the merger of 2001 it has been part of the municipality of Rue.

== History ==
Promasens is first mentioned before 1166, under its present name. It lies on the old Roman road from Vevey to Moudon, and a few Roman coins were found there in the 19th century.

A fief of the lords of Rue, Promasens passed to Fribourg in 1536 during the conquest of the Pays de Vaud, and thereafter belonged to the bailiwick (1536–1798) and then the district (1798–1848) of Rue. The dukes of Savoy, the lord of Savoy-Vaud, the priory of Ripaille (Savoy) and the abbey of Hautcrêt collected quit-rents (cens) there.

The parish of Promasens included Auboranges (after the Reformation), Blessens and Écublens; Rue separated from it in 1638, Chapelle and Gillarens in 1928, and Mossel in 1938. The first parish priest is mentioned before 1166. The advowson (collature) belonged to the bishop of Lausanne, from the Reformation to the government of Fribourg, and from 1592 to 1620 to the Augustinian friary of Fribourg. The church of Saints Peter and Paul was renovated in 1663; the present church was built between 1869 and 1872 and has stained-glass windows by Willy Jordan (1953).

Agriculture consists of livestock farming and fodder crops. Promasens had 153 inhabitants in 1811, 205 in 1850, 243 in 1900, 212 in 1950 and 246 in 2000. In 2001 it became part of the municipality of Rue.

== Bibliography ==
- A. Dellion, Dictionnaire historique et statistique des paroisses catholiques du canton de Fribourg, 1884–1902, 9, 250–306
- G. Pfulg, Vitraux modernes Romont (FR) et environs, 1991, 16
