= Esmonts =

Former municipality, canton of Fribourg

- Former municipality
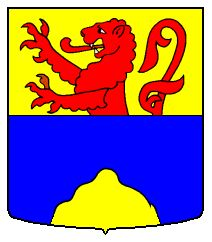
- Coat of arms
- Location of Esmonts
- Location within Switzerland Location within Canton of Fribourg
- Coordinates: 46.641952°N 6.844437°E
- Country: Switzerland
- Canton: Fribourg
- District: Glâne
- Municipality: Ursy

Population (2000)
  - Total: 157
- Time zone: UTC+01:00 (CET)
  - Summer (DST): UTC+02:00 (CEST)
- ISO 3166 code: CH-FR
- Website

Esmonts is a former municipality in the Glâne district of the canton of Fribourg, Switzerland. In 2006 it merged with Vuarmarens, and since 2012 it has been part of the municipality of Ursy.

== History ==
Esmonts is first mentioned in 996 as villa de Mont; in 1832 it appears as ès Monts. In 996 King Rudolph III of Burgundy granted the knight Balfred and his wife Willerma, as a precarium, property of the benefice of the Abbey of Saint-Maurice d'Agaune in the villa de Mont; the couple had previously given this property to Saint-Maurice. The lords of Prez seem to have owned Esmonts, since in 1344 Richard de Prez gave the tithe "de Mont" to the hospital of Moudon, which sold it two centuries later to the government of Fribourg.

Esmonts belonged to the bailiwick of Vaud (castellany of Moudon) until 1536, to the Fribourg bailiwick of Rue from 1536 to 1798, to the district of Rue from 1798 to 1848 and then to the Glâne district. The communal statutes date from 1745. In church matters, Esmonts has always belonged to the parish of Morlens, called Ursy-Morlens from 1869.

Fodder crops (barley, wheat and beets) are grown, and livestock farming and milk production are practiced. Esmonts had 68 inhabitants in 1811, 118 in 1850, 168 in 1900, 203 in 1930, 182 in 1950 and 157 in 2000. In 2006 it merged with Vuarmarens.

== Bibliography ==
- A. Dellion, Dictionnaire historique et statistique des paroisses catholiques du canton de Fribourg, 1884–1902, 11, 256
