= Bionnens =

Former municipality, canton of Fribourg

- Former municipality
- Coat of arms
- Location of Bionnens
- Location within Switzerland Location within Canton of Fribourg
- Coordinates: 46.633336°N 6.850004°E
- Country: Switzerland
- Canton: Fribourg
- District: Glâne
- Municipality: Ursy

Population (2000)
  - Total: 71
- Time zone: UTC+01:00 (CET)
  - Summer (DST): UTC+02:00 (CEST)
- ISO 3166 code: CH-FR
- Website

Bionnens (old German name Bionning) is a former municipality in the Glâne district of the canton of Fribourg, Switzerland. In 2001 it became part of the municipality of Ursy, together with Mossel and Vauderens. It is a small scattered settlement on a hilltop west of and above the upper course of the Glâne.

== History ==
Bionnens is first mentioned in 1369 as Byonens. Roman remains (a sword and coins) were found there in 1834. Bionnens formed a lordship, which belonged to the family of the same name until the 16th century. In 1362 Count Amadeus VI of Savoy invested Pierre de Bionnens with it. Around 1531 it was owned by Aymo Gonel. In 1574 it passed to his son-in-law Wilhelm Techtermann, and it remained in the hands of the Techtermann family until 1838.

From 1536 to 1798 Bionnens belonged to the Fribourg bailiwick of Rue, and from 1831 to 1848 to the district of Rue. It has always belonged to the parish of Ursy-Morlens.

Straw plaiting was practiced in the 19th century. Bionnens has kept its rural character, with livestock farming and the growing of fodder crops and cereals; in 1990 the primary sector provided 78% of jobs. Bionnens had 77 inhabitants in 1811, 95 in 1850, 67 in 1900, 90 in 1950, 56 in 1980 and 71 in 2000. In 2001 it became part of the municipality of Ursy.
