= Gillarens =

Former municipality, canton of Fribourg

- Former municipality
- Location of Gillarens
- Location within Switzerland Location within Canton of Fribourg
- Coordinates: 46.58334°N 6.833326°E
- Country: Switzerland
- Canton: Fribourg
- District: Glâne
- Municipality: Rue

Population (2000)
  - Total: 177
- Time zone: UTC+01:00 (CET)
  - Summer (DST): UTC+02:00 (CEST)
- SFOS number: 2077
- ISO 3166 code: CH-FR
- Website

Gillarens is a former municipality in the canton of Fribourg, Switzerland, on the border between Fribourg and Vaud. It belonged to the Glâne district from 1848, and since 2001 it has been part of the municipality of Rue.

== History ==
Gillarens is first mentioned in the 12th century as Gislerens; it appears as Gislarens in 1225 and as Gillarens in 1273. Between 1147 and 1150 the Abbey of Saint-Maurice ceded its land at Gillarens to the monastery of Hautcrêt in return for a quit-rent. A noble family of Gillarens is mentioned in the 13th and 14th centuries. Under the House of Savoy, Gillarens belonged to the castellany of Rue until 1536; it then belonged to the Fribourg bailiwick of Rue until 1798, and to the prefecture of Rue until 1848.

In church matters Gillarens belonged to the parish of Promasens. A filial church dedicated to Mary is mentioned in the visitation of 1453. The burghers of Gillarens joined those of Chapelle in asking for a chaplain, and this benefice was established in 1674.

The Foyer Saint-Jean Bosco, an orphanage for girls, was converted in 1987 into a shelter for drug-addicted mothers, and in 1993 into a home for disabled people (Eben-Hezer Foundation). Gillarens has remained agricultural, with wheat, potatoes, beets, livestock farming and dairy production. It had 131 inhabitants in 1811, 152 in 1850, 224 in 1900, 272 in 1950, 207 in 1960, 160 in 1980 and 177 in 2000. In 2001 it became part of the municipality of Rue.

== Bibliography ==
- A. Dellion, Dictionnaire historique et statistique des paroisses catholiques du canton de Fribourg, 1884–1902, 9, 281–297
- La Liberté, 27–28 June 1987
