= Écublens =

Ecublens may refer to:

- Écublens, Fribourg, a former municipality in the canton of Fribourg, Switzerland
- Écublens, Vaud, a municipality in the canton of Vaud, Switzerland
