= Mossel, Switzerland =

Former municipality, canton of Fribourg

Mossel
- Former municipality
- Location of Mossel
- Location within Switzerland Location within Canton of Fribourg
- Coordinates: 46.600007°N 6.850001°E
- Country: Switzerland
- Canton: Fribourg
- District: Glâne
- Municipality: Ursy

Population (2000)
  - Total: 122
- Time zone: UTC+01:00 (CET)
  - Summer (DST): UTC+02:00 (CEST)
- SFOS number: 2091
- ISO 3166 code: CH-FR
- Website

Mossel is a former municipality in the Glâne district of the canton of Fribourg, Switzerland. Since 2001 it has been part of the municipality of Ursy, together with Bionnens and Vauderens. It consists of the village of Mossel and scattered hamlets.

== History ==
Mossel is first mentioned in the middle of the 12th century as Moncels, Muncels and Monticulis. In the first half of the 12th century it belonged to the Saint-Martin-du-Chêne family, lords of Bioley. In 1245 Guillaume gave the land of Mossel, with all its rights of jurisdiction, to the monastery of Hautcrêt, which ran a grange there. A lay brothers' path (chemin des convers), still recorded in 1740, shows the importance the monks had in the region. The lords of Prez and of Rue owned property in Mossel. The village was part of the lordship of Rue; it was incorporated into the bailiwick of Rue (1536–1798), the district of the same name (1798–1848) and then the Glâne district (from 1848).

In church matters, Mossel belonged to the parish of Promasens, and from 1939 to that of Porsel. The chapel of Notre-Dame-de-Compassion (today of the Sacred Heart) was built in 1891. Mossel has a stop on the Romont–Palézieux bus line. Fodder crops are grown and livestock is raised (thirteen farms in 2000).

Mossel had 138 inhabitants in 1811, 187 in 1850, 177 in 1900, 203 in 1950 and 122 in 2000. In 2001 it became part of Ursy.

== Bibliography ==
- Helvetia Sacra, III/3, pp. 143–145, 153, 163
- J.-P. Anderegg et al., Histoire d'une ferme, 1993
