= Morlens =

Former municipality, canton of Fribourg

- Former municipality
- Location of Morlens
- Location within Switzerland Location within Canton of Fribourg
- Coordinates: 46.650008°N 6.833336°E
- Country: Switzerland
- Canton: Fribourg
- District: Glâne
- Municipality: Ursy

Population (1990)
  - Total: 34
- Time zone: UTC+01:00 (CET)
  - Summer (DST): UTC+02:00 (CEST)
- ISO 3166 code: CH-FR
- Website

Morlens is a former municipality in the Glâne district of the canton of Fribourg, Switzerland. In 1991 it merged with Vuarmarens, and since 2012 it has been part of the municipality of Ursy. Its territory consists of isolated farms.

== History ==
Morlens is first mentioned in 996 as Morlingis. A Hallstatt tumulus and a Roman coin have been found near the village. A property of the Abbey of Saint-Maurice d'Agaune, Morlens was the center of one of the oldest parishes in the canton of Fribourg, founded between the 7th and the 9th century. The church, dedicated to Saint Maurice and Saint Medard, was rebuilt in 1493 and restored in 1678. The center of the parish was moved to Ursy in 1869.

From 1536 to 1798 Morlens was part of the bailiwick of Rue, and from 1798 to 1848 of the district of Rue. Forestry, agriculture and livestock farming are practiced; there were six farms in 1990. Morlens had 41 inhabitants in 1811, 62 in 1850, 49 in 1900, 62 in 1950 and 34 in 1990. In 1991 it merged with Vuarmarens.

== Bibliography ==
- L. Waeber, A. Schuwey, Eglises et chapelles du canton de Fribourg, 1957, 302–303
