= Chavannes-sur-Moudon =

- Municipality
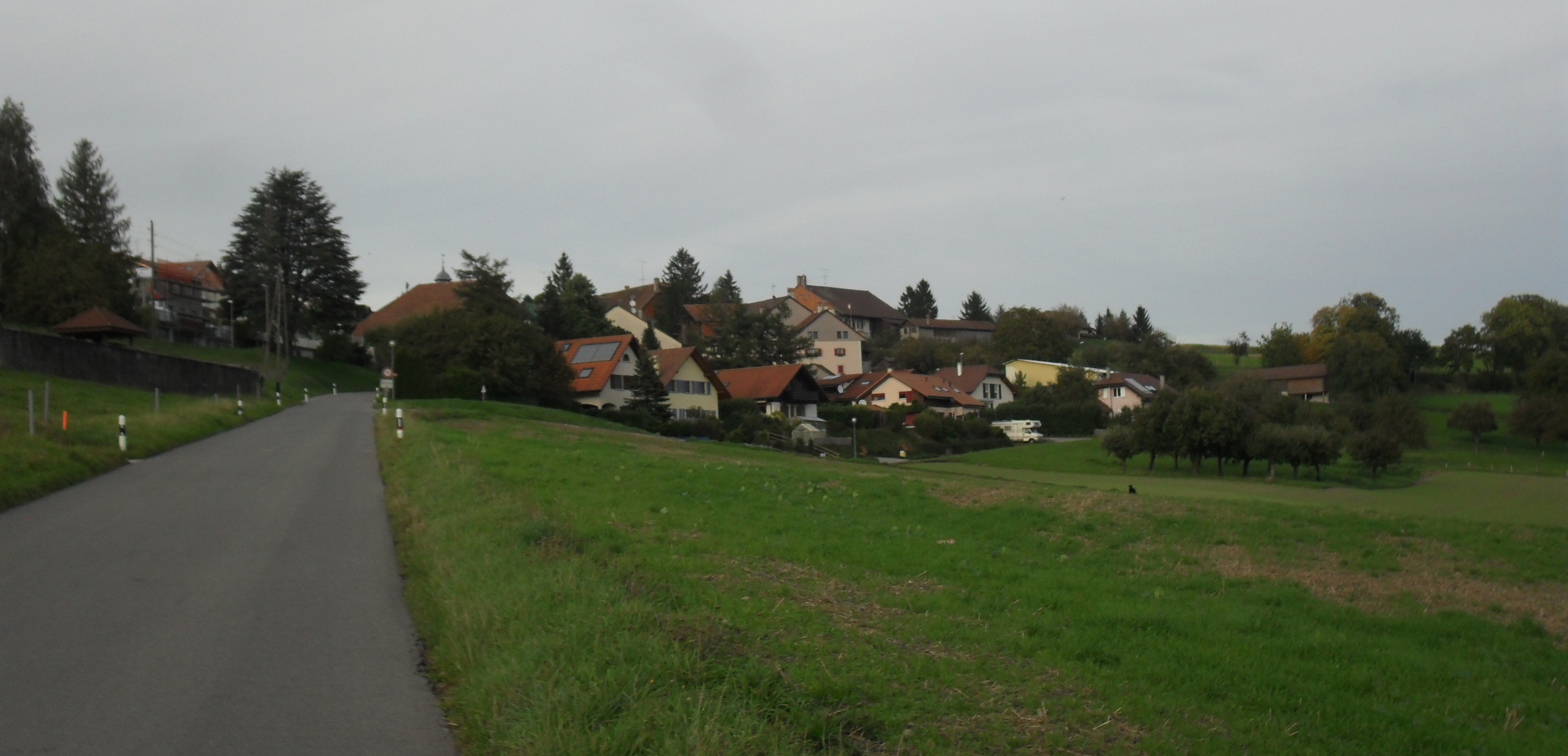

- Flag Coat of arms
- Location of Chavannes-sur-Moudon
- Location within Switzerland Location within Canton of Vaud
- Coordinates: 46°39′N 6°48′E
- Country: Switzerland
- Canton: Vaud
- District: Broye-Vully

Government
  - Mayor: Syndic

Area
  - Total: 5.14 km^{2} (1.98 sq mi)
- Elevation: 680 m (2,230 ft)

Population (2003)
  - Total: 205
  - Density: 39.9/km^{2} (103/sq mi)
- Time zone: UTC+01:00 (CET)
  - Summer (DST): UTC+02:00 (CEST)
- Postal code: 1512
- SFOS number: 5665
- ISO 3166 code: CH-VD
- Surrounded by: Brenles, Chesalles-sur-Moudon, Montet (Glâne) (FR), Moudon, Vuarmarens (FR), Vulliens
- Website: www.chavannes-sur-moudon.ch

Chavannes-sur-Moudon is a municipality in the district Broye-Vully in the canton of Vaud in Switzerland.

== History ==
Chavannes-sur-Moudon is first mentioned in 1453 as Chavanes.

== Geography ==
Aerial view (1958)

Chavannes-sur-Moudon has an area, as of 2009, of 5.14 square kilometers (1.98 sq mi). Of this area, 3.88 km^{2} (1.50 sq mi) or 75.5% is used for agricultural purposes, while 1 km^{2} (0.39 sq mi) or 19.5% is forested. Of the rest of the land, 0.27 km^{2} (0.10 sq mi) or 5.3% is settled (buildings or roads).

Of the built up area, housing and buildings made up 1.9% and transportation infrastructure made up 3.1%. Out of the forested land, 18.3% of the total land area is heavily forested and 1.2% is covered with orchards or small clusters of trees. Of the agricultural land, 54.1% is used for growing crops and 20.8% is pastures.

The municipality was part of the Moudon District until it was dissolved on 31 August 2006, and Chavannes-sur-Moudon became part of the new district of Broye-Vully.

The municipality is located on the right bank of the Broye and near the border with the Canton of Fribourg.

== Coat of arms ==
The blazon of the municipal coat of arms is Gules, issuant from sinister an Arm holding a Key all of Argent.

== Demographics ==
Chavannes-sur-Moudon has a population (as of December 2020) of 223. As of 2008, 7.7% of the population are resident foreign nationals. Over the last 10 years (1999–2009 ) the population has changed at a rate of -1.9%. It has changed at a rate of -1.4% due to migration and at a rate of 0% due to births and deaths.

Most of the population (as of 2000) speaks French (190 or 96.4%), with German being second most common (6 or 3.0%) and Albanian being third (1 or 0.5%).

Of the population in the municipality 88 or about 44.7% were born in Chavannes-sur-Moudon and lived there in 2000. There were 66 or 33.5% who were born in the same canton, while 31 or 15.7% were born somewhere else in Switzerland, and 11 or 5.6% were born outside of Switzerland.

In 2008 there were no live births to Swiss citizens and 3 deaths of Swiss citizens. Ignoring immigration and emigration, the population of Swiss citizens decreased by 3 while the foreign population remained the same. The total Swiss population change in 2008 (from all sources, including moves across municipal borders) was a decrease of 5 and the non-Swiss population decreased by 1 people. This represents a population growth rate of -2.8%.

The age distribution, as of 2009, in Chavannes-sur-Moudon is; 24 children or 11.7% of the population are between 0 and 9 years old and 25 teenagers or 12.2% are between 10 and 19. Of the adult population, 14 people or 6.8% of the population are between 20 and 29 years old. 23 people or 11.2% are between 30 and 39, 37 people or 18.0% are between 40 and 49, and 32 people or 15.6% are between 50 and 59. The senior population distribution is 23 people or 11.2% of the population are between 60 and 69 years old, 14 people or 6.8% are between 70 and 79, there are 12 people or 5.9% who are between 80 and 89, and there is 1 person who is 90 and older.

As of 2000, there were 75 people who were single and never married in the municipality. There were 99 married individuals, 16 widows or widowers and 7 individuals who are divorced.

As of 2000, there were 78 private households in the municipality, and an average of 2.5 persons per household. There were 20 households that consist of only one person and 9 households with five or more people. Out of a total of 80 households that answered this question, 25.0% were households made up of just one person. Of the rest of the households, there are 29 married couples without children, 25 married couples with children. There were 3 single parents with a child or children. There was 1 household that was made up of unrelated people and 2 households that were made up of some sort of institution or another collective housing.

In 2000 there were 24 single family homes (or 40.0% of the total) out of a total of 60 inhabited buildings. There were 10 multi-family buildings (16.7%) and along with 26 multi-purpose buildings that were mostly used for housing (43.3%). Of the single family homes 8 were built before 1919, while 3 were built between 1990 and 2000. The most multi-family homes (7) were built before 1919 and the next most (2) were built between 1981 and 1990.

In 2000 there were 85 apartments in the municipality. The most common apartment size was 3 rooms of which there were 22. There were single room apartments and 35 apartments with five or more rooms. Of these apartments, a total of 75 apartments (88.2% of the total) were permanently occupied, while 9 apartments (10.6%) were seasonally occupied and 1 apartments (1.2%) were empty. As of 2009, the construction rate of new housing units was 0 new units per 1000 residents. The vacancy rate for the municipality, in 2010, was 0%.

The historical population is given in the following chart:

== Sights ==
The entire village of Chavannes-sur-Moudon is designated as part of the Inventory of Swiss Heritage Sites.

== Politics ==
In the 2007 federal election the most popular party was the SVP which received 48.56% of the vote. The next three most popular parties were the FDP (19.38%), the SP (13.69%) and the Green Party (5.04%). In the federal election, a total of 81 votes were cast, and the voter turnout was 51.9%.

== Economy ==
As of 2010, Chavannes-sur-Moudon had an unemployment rate of 2.1%. As of 2008, there were 48 people employed in the primary economic sector and about 18 businesses involved in this sector. 1 person was employed in the secondary sector and there was 1 business in this sector. 3 people were employed in the tertiary sector, with 2 businesses in this sector. There were 104 residents of the municipality who were employed in some capacity, of which females made up 42.3% of the workforce.

In 2008 the total number of full-time equivalent jobs was 33. The number of jobs in the primary sector was 30, all of which were in agriculture. The number of jobs in the secondary sector was 1, all of which were in construction. The number of jobs in the tertiary sector was 2, of which 1 was in education.

In 2000, there were 3 workers who commuted into the municipality and 56 workers who commuted away. The municipality is a net exporter of workers, with about 18.7 workers leaving the municipality for every one entering. Of the working population, 5.8% used public transportation to get to work, and 51.9% used a private car.

== Religion ==
From the 2000 census, 37 or 18.8% were Roman Catholic, while 141 or 71.6% belonged to the Swiss Reformed Church. Of the rest of the population, there was 1 member of an Orthodox church who belonged. There was 1 individual who was Jewish, and 3 (or about 1.52% of the population) who were Islamic. 11 (or about 5.58% of the population) belonged to no church, are agnostic or atheist, and 3 individuals (or about 1.52% of the population) did not answer the question.

== Education ==
In Chavannes-sur-Moudon about 62 or (31.5%) of the population have completed non-mandatory upper secondary education, and 20 or (10.2%) have completed additional higher education (either university or a Fachhochschule). Of the 20 who completed tertiary schooling, 55.0% were Swiss men, 45.0% were Swiss women.

In the 2009/2010 school year there were a total of 27 students in the Chavannes-sur-Moudon school district. In the Vaud cantonal school system, two years of non-obligatory pre-school are provided by the political districts. During the school year, the political district provided pre-school care for a total of 155 children of which 83 children (53.5%) received subsidized pre-school care. The canton's primary school program requires students to attend for four years. There were 14 students in the municipal primary school program. The obligatory lower secondary school program lasts for six years and there were 13 students in those schools.

As of 2000, there were 12 students in Chavannes-sur-Moudon who came from another municipality, while 22 residents attended schools outside the municipality.
