= Blessens =

Former municipality, canton of Fribourg

- Former municipality
- Location of Blessens
- Location within Switzerland Location within Canton of Fribourg
- Coordinates: 46.61667°N 6.833331°E
- Country: Switzerland
- Canton: Fribourg
- District: Glâne
- Municipality: Rue

Population (1990)
  - Total: 89
- Time zone: UTC+01:00 (CET)
  - Summer (DST): UTC+02:00 (CEST)
- SFOS number: 2065
- ISO 3166 code: CH-FR
- Website

Blessens is a village and former municipality in the canton of Fribourg, Switzerland. Since 1993 it has been part of the municipality of Rue. It includes the hamlet of Arlens.

== History ==
Blessens is first mentioned in 1155. A richly furnished Celtic grave and Roman remains have been found there. In the Middle Ages Blessens belonged to the lordship of Rue, from 1536 to the bailiwick of Rue, and from 1798 to 1848 to the district of Rue. A family of the same name is recorded from 1294 to 1397, and a knight, Jordanus de Blessens, in 1287.

Blessens belongs to the parish of Promasens. Its chapel of Saint Joseph was built in 1683. The small village has kept its agricultural character, with livestock farming and fodder crops.

Blessens had 98 inhabitants in 1811, 137 in 1850, 143 in 1870, 136 in 1900, 133 in 1910, 163 in 1930, 154 in 1950, 119 in 1970 and 89 in 1990. In 1993 it became part of the municipality of Rue.

== Bibliography ==
- A. Dellion, Dictionnaire historique et statistique des paroisses catholiques du canton de Fribourg, 1884–1902, 9–10, 280–281
- La Liberté, 7 July 1988
