= Vuibroye =

- Former municipality
- Coat of arms
- Location of Vuibroye
- Location within Switzerland Location within Canton of Vaud
- Coordinates: 46°34′N 06°48′E
- Country: Switzerland
- Canton: Vaud
- District: Lavaux-Oron

Government
  - Mayor: Bernard Matthey

Area
  - Total: 1.41 km^{2} (0.54 sq mi)
- Elevation: 639 m (2,096 ft)

Population (2010)
  - Total: 124
  - Density: 87.9/km^{2} (228/sq mi)
- Demonym: Les Châtre-truies
- Time zone: UTC+01:00 (CET)
  - Summer (DST): UTC+02:00 (CEST)
- Postal code: 1610
- SFOS number: 5802
- ISO 3166 code: CH-VD
- Surrounded by: Auboranges (FR), Oron-la-Ville, Châtillens, Essertes
- Website: Profile (in French), SFSO statistics

Vuibroye (French pronunciation: [vɥibʁwa]) is a former municipality in the district of Lavaux-Oron in the canton of Vaud in Switzerland. The municipalities of Bussigny-sur-Oron, Châtillens, Chesalles-sur-Oron, Ecoteaux, Oron-la-Ville, Oron-le-Châtel, Palézieux, Les Tavernes, Les Thioleyres and Vuibroye merged on 1 January 2012 into the new municipality of Oron.

== Geography ==
Vuibroye had an area, as of 2009, of 1.4 square kilometers (0.54 mi^{2}). Of this area, 1.16 km^{2} (0.45 mi^{2}) or 82.9% is used for agricultural purposes, while 0.15 km^{2} (0.058 mi^{2}) or 10.7% is forested. Of the rest of the land, 0.12 km^{2} (30 acres) or 8.6% is settled (buildings or roads), 0.01 km^{2} (2.5 acres) or 0.7% is either rivers or lakes.

Of the built up area, housing and buildings made up 6.4% and transportation infrastructure made up 2.1%. Out of the forested land, 5.0% of the total land area is heavily forested and 5.7% is covered with orchards or small clusters of trees. Of the agricultural land, 57.1% is used for growing crops and 23.6% is pastures, while 2.1% is used for orchards or vine crops. All the water in the municipality is flowing water.

The former municipality was part of the Oron District until it was dissolved on 31 August 2006, and Vuibroye became part of the new district of Lavaux-Oron.

== Coat of arms ==
The blazon of the municipal coat of arms is Argent, two Bars wavy Azure, overall a Lion rampant Or.

== Demographics ==
Vuibroye had a population (as of 2010) of 124. As of 2008, 1.6% of the population are resident foreign nationals. Over the last 10 years (1999–2009 ) the population has changed at a rate of 8.7%. It has changed at a rate of 7% due to migration and at a rate of 2.6% due to births and deaths.

Most of the population (as of 2000) speaks French (103 or 85.8%), with English being second most common (14 or 11.7%) and German being third (2 or 1.7%).

The age distribution, as of 2009, in Vuibroye is; 18 children or 14.4% of the population are between 0 and 9 years old and 22 teenagers or 17.6% are between 10 and 19. Of the adult population, 11 people or 8.8% of the population are between 20 and 29 years old. 15 people or 12.0% are between 30 and 39, 17 people or 13.6% are between 40 and 49, and 15 people or 12.0% are between 50 and 59. The senior population distribution is 14 people or 11.2% of the population are between 60 and 69 years old, 8 people or 6.4% are between 70 and 79, there are 5 people or 4.0% who are between 80 and 89.

As of 2000, there were 53 people who were single and never married in the municipality. There were 57 married individuals, 3 widows or widowers and 7 individuals who are divorced.

As of 2000 the average number of residents per living room was 0.54 which is fewer people per room than the cantonal average of 0.61 per room. In this case, a room is defined as space of a housing unit of at least 4 m^{2} (43 sq ft) as normal bedrooms, dining rooms, living rooms, kitchens and habitable cellars and attics. About 56.1% of the total households were owner occupied, or in other words did not pay rent (though they may have a mortgage or a rent-to-own agreement).

As of 2000, there were 41 private households in the municipality, and an average of 2.9 persons per household. There were 7 households that consist of only one person and 8 households with five or more people. Out of a total of 42 households that answered this question, 16.7% were households made up of just one person. Of the rest of the households, there are 13 married couples without children, 17 married couples with children There were 3 single parents with a child or children. There was 1 household that was made up of unrelated people and 1 household that was made up of some sort of institution or another collective housing.

In 2000 there were 21 single family homes (or 65.6% of the total) out of a total of 32 inhabited buildings. There were 7 multi-family buildings (21.9%) and along with 4 multi-purpose buildings that were mostly used for housing (12.5%).

In 2000, a total of 41 apartments (100.0% of the total) were permanently occupied. As of 2009, the construction rate of new housing units was 0 new units per 1000 residents. The vacancy rate for the municipality, in 2010, was 0%.

The historical population is given in the following chart:

== Politics ==
In the 2007 federal election the most popular party was the SVP which received 34.07% of the vote. The next three most popular parties were the SP (18.15%), the FDP (9.88%) and the LPS Party (9.38%). In the federal election, a total of 45 votes were cast, and the voter turnout was 51.7%.

== Economy ==
As of 2010, Vuibroye had an unemployment rate of 5.2%. As of 2008, there were 7 people employed in the primary economic sector and about 2 businesses involved in this sector. No one was employed in the secondary sector. 3 people were employed in the tertiary sector, with 2 businesses in this sector. There were 53 residents of the municipality who were employed in some capacity, of which females made up 47.2% of the workforce.

In 2008 the total number of full-time equivalent jobs was 8. The number of jobs in the primary sector was 5, all of which were in agriculture. There were no jobs in the secondary sector. The number of jobs in the tertiary sector was 3. In the tertiary sector; 1 was in the sale or repair of motor vehicles and 2 were technical professionals or scientists.

In 2000, there were 2 workers who commuted into the municipality and 47 workers who commuted away. The municipality is a net exporter of workers, with about 23.5 workers leaving the municipality for every one entering. Of the working population, 7.5% used public transportation to get to work, and 84.9% used a private car.

== Religion ==
From the 2000 census, 23 or 19.2% were Roman Catholic, while 63 or 52.5% belonged to the Swiss Reformed Church. Of the rest of the population, there was 1 member of an Orthodox church, and there were 19 individuals (or about 15.83% of the population) who belonged to another Christian church. 19 (or about 15.83% of the population) belonged to no church, are agnostic or atheist, and 2 individuals (or about 1.67% of the population) did not answer the question.

== Education ==
In Vuibroye about 36 or (30.0%) of the population have completed non-mandatory upper secondary education, and 21 or (17.5%) have completed additional higher education (either university or a Fachhochschule). Of the 21 who completed tertiary schooling, 38.1% were Swiss men, 28.6% were Swiss women, 23.8% were non-Swiss men.

In the 2009/2010 school year there were a total of 19 students in the Vuibroye school district. In the Vaud cantonal school system, two years of non-obligatory pre-school are provided by the political districts. During the school year, the political district provided pre-school care for a total of 665 children of which 232 children (34.9%) received subsidized pre-school care. The canton's primary school program requires students to attend for four years. There were 10 students in the municipal primary school program. The obligatory lower secondary school program lasts for six years and there were 9 students in those schools.

As of 2000, there were 4 students in Vuibroye who came from another municipality, while 27 residents attended schools outside the municipality.
