= Montet =

- Former municipality
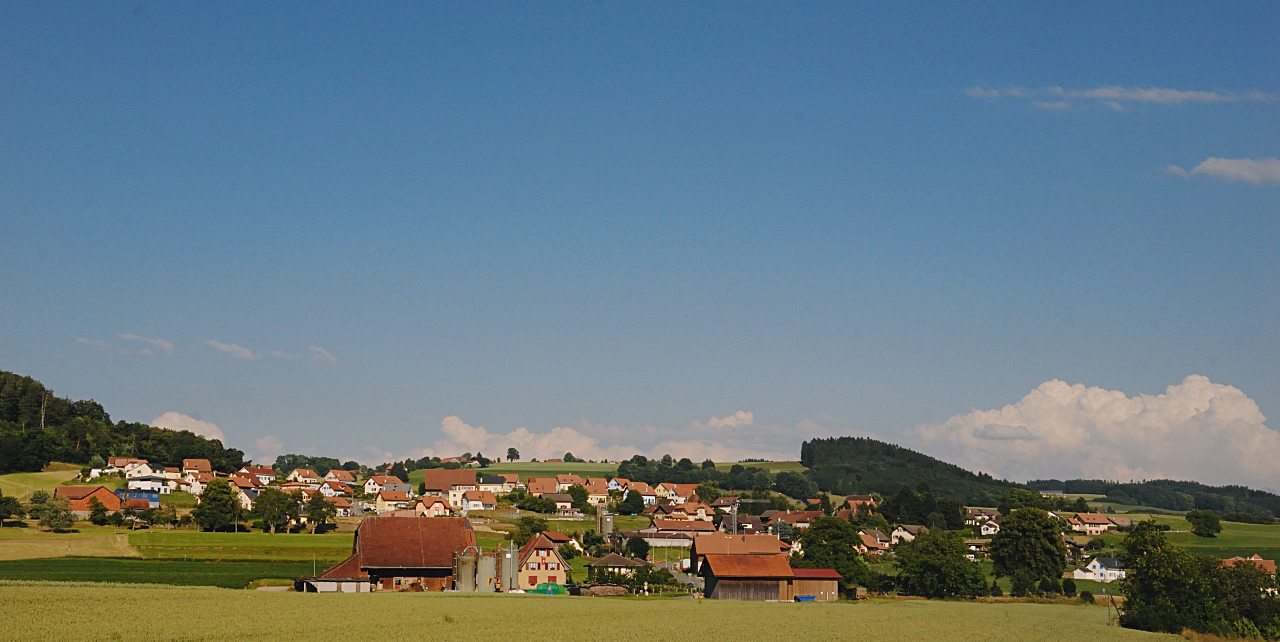
- Montet village

- Coat of arms
- Location of Montet
- Location within Switzerland Location within Canton of Fribourg
- Coordinates: 46°39′N 6°49′E
- Country: Switzerland
- Canton: Fribourg
- District: Glâne

Government
  - Mayor: Syndic

Area
  - Total: 2.20 km^{2} (0.85 sq mi)
- Elevation: 652 m (2,139 ft)

Population (December 2020)
  - Total: 444
  - Density: 202/km^{2} (523/sq mi)
- Time zone: UTC+01:00 (CET)
  - Summer (DST): UTC+02:00 (CEST)
- Postal code: 1674
- SFOS number: 2089
- ISO 3166 code: CH-FR
- Surrounded by: Chavannes-sur-Moudon (VD), Ecublens, Moudon (VD), Rue, Vuarmarens, Vulliens (VD)
- Website: www.montet-glane.ch

Montet (French pronunciation: [mɔ̃tɛ]) is a former municipality in the district of Glâne in the canton of Fribourg in Switzerland. On 1 January 2025 the former municipality of Montet merged into the municipality of Ursy.

== History ==
Montet is first mentioned in 1255 as Montez.

== Geography ==
Montet has an area, as of 2009, of 2.2 square kilometers (0.85 mi^{2}). Of this area, 1.54 km^{2} (0.59 mi^{2}) or 70.3% is used for agricultural purposes, while 0.44 km^{2} (0.17 mi^{2}) or 20.1% is forested. Of the rest of the land, 0.17 km^{2} (0.066 mi^{2}) or 7.8% is settled (buildings or roads), 0.04 km^{2} (9.9 acres) or 1.8% is either rivers or lakes.

Of the built up area, housing and buildings made up 3.7% and transportation infrastructure made up 3.2%. Out of the forested land, 18.7% of the total land area is heavily forested and 1.4% is covered with orchards or small clusters of trees. Of the agricultural land, 47.9% is used for growing crops and 21.0% is pastures, while 1.4% is used for orchards or vine crops. All the water in the municipality is flowing water.

The municipality is located on the border with the Canton of Vaud.

== Coat of arms ==
The blazon of the municipal coat of arms is Azure a Wing Or and on a Chief Argent a Cross bottony of the first.

== Demographics ==
Montet has a population (as of December 2020) of 444. As of 2008, 12.4% of the population are resident foreign nationals. Over the last 10 years (2000–2010) the population has changed at a rate of 122.8%. Migration accounted for 119.8%, while births and deaths accounted for 12%.

Most of the population (as of 2000) speaks French (168 or 97.1%) as their first language with the rest speaking German

As of 2008, the population was made up of 317 Swiss citizens and 45 non-citizen residents (12.43% of the population). Of the population in the municipality, 37 or about 21.4% were born in Montet and lived there in 2000. There were 56 or 32.4% who were born in the same canton, while 59 or 34.1% were born somewhere else in Switzerland, and 17 or 9.8% were born outside of Switzerland.

As of 2000, children and teenagers (0–19 years old) make up 26.6% of the population, while adults (20–64 years old) make up 60.1% and seniors (over 64 years old) make up 13.3%. As of 2000, there were 69 people who were single and never married in the municipality. There were 90 married individuals, 6 widows or widowers and 8 individuals who are divorced.

As of 2000, there were 69 private households in the municipality, and an average of 2.4 persons per household. There were 17 households that consist of only one person and 7 households with five or more people. In 2000, a total of 68 apartments (95.8% of the total) were permanently occupied, while 2 apartments (2.8%) were seasonally occupied and one apartment was empty. The vacancy rate for the municipality, in 2010, was 1.55%.

The historical population is given in the following chart:

== Politics ==
In the 2011 federal election the most popular party was the SVP which received 29.7% of the vote. The next three most popular parties were the CVP (21.8%), the SP (17.2%) and the Green Party (9.1%).

The SVP received about the same percentage of the vote as they did in the 2007 Federal election (32.5% in 2007 vs 29.7% in 2011). The CVP moved from third in 2007 (with 17.0%) to second in 2011, the SPS moved from second in 2007 (with 22.7%) to third and the Green moved from below fourth place in 2007 to fourth. A total of 101 votes were cast in this election, of which 1 was invalid.

== Economy ==
As of 2010, Montet had an unemployment rate of 6.3%. As of 2008, there were 13 people employed in the primary economic sector and about 5 businesses involved in this sector. 2 people were employed in the secondary sector and there was 1 business in this sector. 3 people were employed in the tertiary sector, with 3 businesses in this sector. There were 92 residents of the municipality who were employed in some capacity, of which females made up 41.3% of the workforce.

In 2008 the total number of full-time equivalent jobs was 14. The number of jobs in the primary sector was 10, all of which were in agriculture. The number of jobs in the secondary sector was one, which was in manufacturing. The number of jobs in the tertiary sector was 3, of which 2 were in education.

In 2000, there were 4 workers who commuted into the municipality and 78 workers who commuted away. The municipality is a net exporter of workers, with about 19.5 workers leaving the municipality for every one entering. Of the working population, 9.8% used public transportation to get to work, and 78.3% used a private car.

== Religion ==
From the 2000 census, 112 or 64.7% were Roman Catholic, while 43 or 24.9% belonged to the Swiss Reformed Church. Of the rest of the population, there was 1 individual who belongs to another Christian church. There were 2 (or about 1.16% of the population) who were Islamic. 12 (or about 6.94% of the population) belonged to no church, are agnostic or atheist, and 3 individuals (or about 1.73% of the population) did not answer the question.

== Education ==
In Montet about 57 or (32.9%) of the population have completed non-mandatory upper secondary education, and 13 or (7.5%) have completed additional higher education (either university or a Fachhochschule). Of the 13 who completed tertiary schooling, 84.6% were Swiss men, 15.4% were Swiss women.

The Canton of Fribourg school system provides one year of non-obligatory Kindergarten, followed by six years of Primary school. This is followed by three years of obligatory lower Secondary school where the students are separated according to ability and aptitude. Following the lower Secondary students may attend a three or four year optional upper Secondary school. The upper Secondary school is divided into gymnasium (university preparatory) and vocational programs. After they finish the upper Secondary program, students may choose to attend a Tertiary school or continue their apprenticeship.

During the 2010-11 school year, there were a total of 35 students attending 2 classes in Montet. A total of 60 students from the municipality attended any school, either in the municipality or outside of it. There was one kindergarten class with a total of 16 students in the municipality. The municipality had one primary class and 19 students. During the same year, there were no lower secondary classes in the municipality, but 17 students attended lower secondary school in a neighboring municipality. There were no upper Secondary classes or vocational classes, but there were 2 upper Secondary students and 7 upper Secondary vocational students who attended classes in another municipality. The municipality had no non-university Tertiary classes. who attended classes in another municipality.

As of 2000, there were 23 students in Montet who came from another municipality, while 27 residents attended schools outside the municipality.
