= Vuarmarens =

- Former municipality
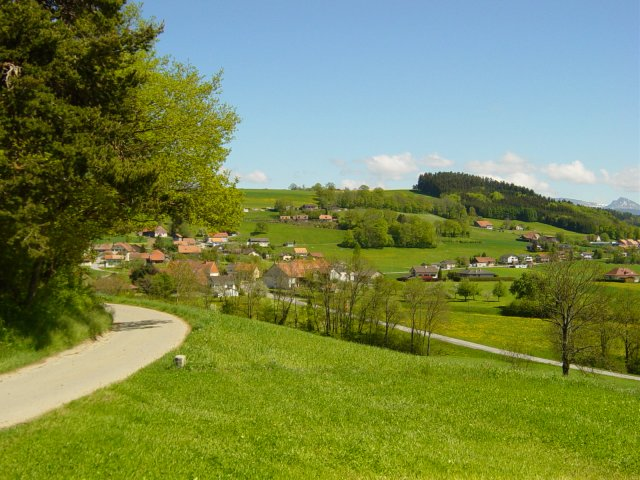
- Vuarmarens village

- Coat of arms
- Location of Vuarmarens
- Location within Switzerland Location within Canton of Fribourg
- Coordinates: 46°39′N 6°50′E
- Country: Switzerland
- Canton: Fribourg
- District: Glâne

Area
  - Total: 6.03 km^{2} (2.33 sq mi)
- Elevation: 685 m (2,247 ft)

Population (December 2020)
  - Total: 610
  - Density: 100/km^{2} (260/sq mi)
- Time zone: UTC+01:00 (CET)
  - Summer (DST): UTC+02:00 (CEST)
- Postal code: 1674
- SFOS number: 2112
- ISO 3166 code: CH-FR
- Surrounded by: Brenles (VD), Chavannes-sur-Moudon (VD), Esmonts, Montet (Glâne), Rue, Ursy
- Website: SFSO statistics

Vuarmarens (French: [vɥaʁmaʁɑ̃s]; Arpitan: Vouarmarens [vwaʁmaˈʁɛ̃]) is a former municipality in the district of Glâne in the canton of Fribourg in Switzerland. On January 1, 2006, Vuarmarens incorporated the formerly independent municipality of Esmonts. On 1 January 2012, the municipality of Vuarmarens merged into the municipality of Ursy.

== Geography ==
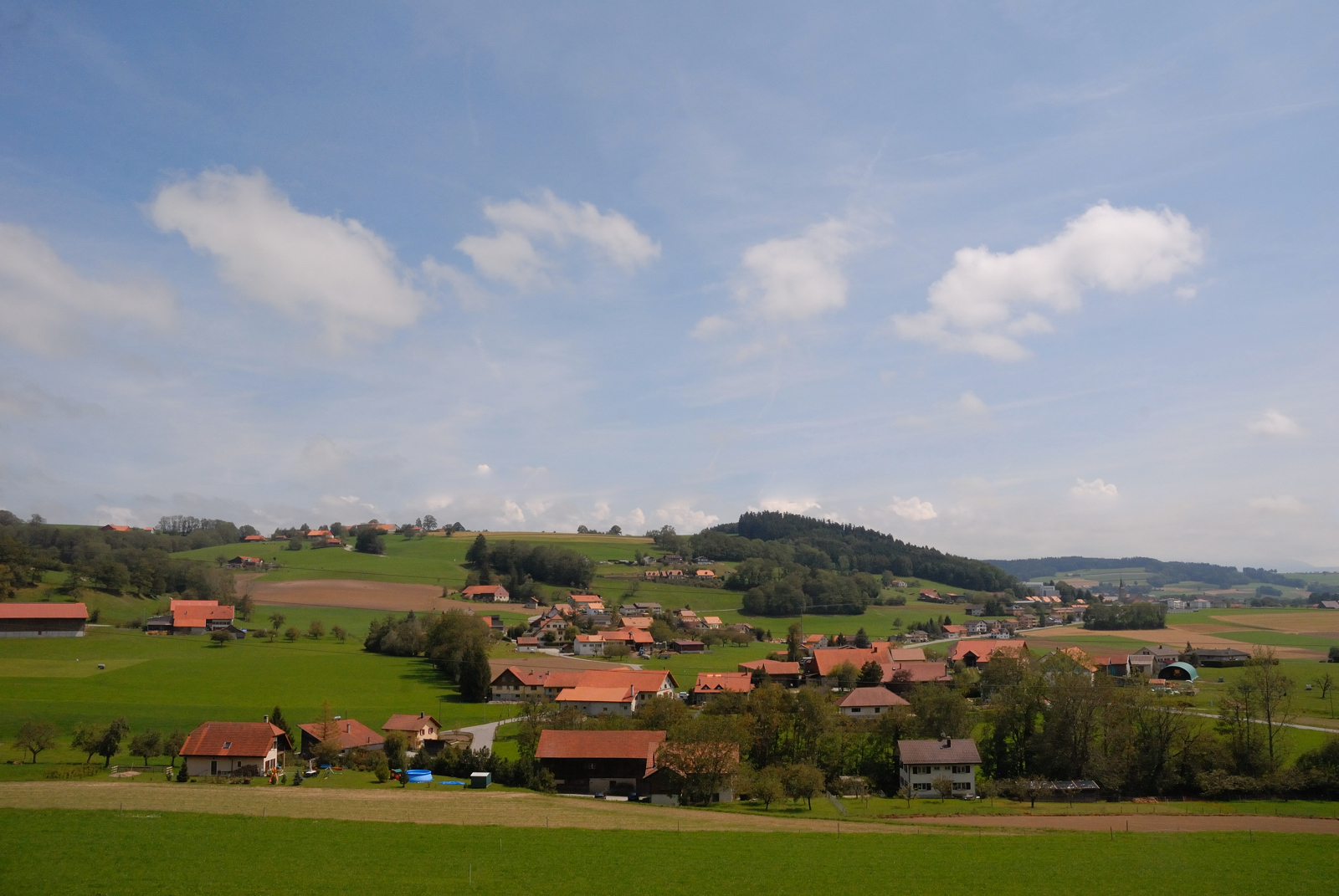
Vaurmarens and surroundings

Vuarmarens has an area, as of 2009, of 6 square kilometers (2.3 mi^{2}). Of this area, 3.98 km^{2} (1.54 mi^{2}) or 66.0% is used for agricultural purposes, while 1.65 km^{2} (0.64 mi^{2}) or 27.4% is forested. Of the rest of the land, 0.4 km^{2} (0.15 mi^{2}) or 6.6% is settled (buildings or roads).

Of the built up area, housing and buildings made up 4.1% and transportation infrastructure made up 2.3%. Out of the forested land, 26.2% of the total land area is heavily forested and 1.2% is covered with orchards or small clusters of trees. Of the agricultural land, 38.3% is used for growing crops and 26.7% is pastures.

== Coat of arms ==
The blazon of the municipal coat of arms is Gules, a Key upright Argent and on a Chief of the last a Cross bottony of the first. When Morlens merged into Vuarmarens, it retained Vuarmarens traditional coat of arms.

== Demographics ==
Vuarmarens had a population (as of December 2020) of 610. As of 2008, 4.0% of the population are resident foreign nationals. Over the last 10 years (2000–2010) the population has changed at a rate of 22.6%. Migration accounted for 15%, while births and deaths accounted for 8.9%.

Most of the population (as of 2000) speaks French (327 or 96.5%) as their first language, German is the second most common (8 or 2.4%) and Portuguese is the third (2 or 0.6%). There is 1 person who speaks Italian.

As of 2008, the population was 53.2% male and 46.8% female. The population was made up of 305 Swiss men (50.7% of the population) and 15 (2.5%) non-Swiss men. There were 270 Swiss women (44.9%) and 12 (2.0%) non-Swiss women. Of the population in the municipality, 132 or about 38.9% were born in Vuarmarens and lived there in 2000. There were 109 or 32.2% who were born in the same canton, while 73 or 21.5% were born somewhere else in Switzerland, and 21 or 6.2% were born outside of Switzerland.

As of 2000, children and teenagers (0–19 years old) make up 29.4% of the population, while adults (20–64 years old) make up 58.7% and seniors (over 64 years old) make up 11.9%.

As of 2000, there were 149 people who were single and never married in the municipality. There were 164 married individuals, 14 widows or widowers and 12 individuals who are divorced.

As of 2000, there were 176 private households in the municipality, and an average of 2.8 persons per household. There were 19 households that consist of only one person and 10 households with five or more people. In 2000, a total of 115 apartments (92.0% of the total) were permanently occupied, while 6 apartments (4.8%) were seasonally occupied and 4 apartments (3.2%) were empty. As of 2009, the construction rate of new housing units was 6.6 new units per 1000 residents.

The historical population is given in the following chart:

== Politics ==
In the 2011 federal election the most popular party was the CVP which received 31.3% of the vote. The next three most popular parties were the SP (22.7%), the SVP (21.8%) and the FDP (7.3%).

The CVP improved their position in Vuarmarens rising to first, from second in 2007 (with 27.1%) The SPS moved from third in 2007 (with 19.2%) to second in 2011, the SVP moved from first in 2007 (with 29.3%) to third and the FDP retained about the same popularity (10.9% in 2007). A total of 153 votes were cast in this election, of which 1 or 0.7% was invalid.

== Economy ==
As of 2010, Vuarmarens had an unemployment rate of 1.6%. As of 2008, there were 49 people employed in the primary economic sector and about 18 businesses involved in this sector. 29 people were employed in the secondary sector and there were 6 businesses in this sector. 26 people were employed in the tertiary sector, with 6 businesses in this sector. There were 173 residents of the municipality who were employed in some capacity, of which females made up 41.0% of the workforce.

In 2008 the total number of full-time equivalent jobs was 91. The number of jobs in the primary sector was 39, all of which were in agriculture. The number of jobs in the secondary sector was 29 of which 7 or (24.1%) were in manufacturing and 22 (75.9%) were in construction. The number of jobs in the tertiary sector was 23. In the tertiary sector; 4 or 17.4% were in the sale or repair of motor vehicles, 4 or 17.4% were in the information industry, 3 or 13.0% were technical professionals or scientists, 5 or 21.7% were in education.

In 2000, there were 11 workers who commuted into the municipality and 134 workers who commuted away. The municipality is a net exporter of workers, with about 12.2 workers leaving the municipality for every one entering. Of the working population, 6% used public transportation to get to work, and 68.9% used a private car.

== Religion ==
From the 2000 census, 270 or 79.6% were Roman Catholic, while 40 or 11.8% belonged to the Swiss Reformed Church. Of the rest of the population, there were 4 individuals (or about 1.18% of the population) who belonged to another Christian church. There were 2 (or about 0.59% of the population) who were Islamic. There was 1 person who was Buddhist. 20 (or about 5.90% of the population) belonged to no church, are agnostic or atheist, and 4 individuals (or about 1.18% of the population) did not answer the question.

== Education ==
In Vuarmarens about 115 or (33.9%) of the population have completed non-mandatory upper secondary education, and 26 or (7.7%) have completed additional higher education (either university or a Fachhochschule). Of the 26 who completed tertiary schooling, 80.8% were Swiss men, 19.2% were Swiss women.

The Canton of Fribourg school system provides one year of non-obligatory Kindergarten, followed by six years of Primary school. This is followed by three years of obligatory lower Secondary school where the students are separated according to ability and aptitude. Following the lower Secondary students may attend a three or four year optional upper Secondary school. The upper Secondary school is divided into gymnasium (university preparatory) and vocational programs. After they finish the upper Secondary program, students may choose to attend a Tertiary school or continue their apprenticeship.

During the 2010-11 school year, there were a total of 61 students attending 3 classes in Vuarmarens. A total of 122 students from the municipality attended any school, either in the municipality or outside of it. There were no kindergarten classes in the municipality, but 12 students attended kindergarten in a neighboring municipality. The municipality had 3 primary classes and 61 students. During the same year, there were no lower secondary classes in the municipality, but 28 students attended lower secondary school in a neighboring municipality. There were no upper Secondary classes or vocational classes, but there were 8 upper Secondary students and 19 upper Secondary vocational students who attended classes in another municipality. The municipality had no non-university Tertiary classes, but there were 2 non-university Tertiary students and 3 specialized Tertiary students who attended classes in another municipality.

As of 2000, there were 8 students in Vuarmarens who came from another municipality, while 42 residents attended schools outside the municipality.
