= Rue Castle =

Castle in Rue, Switzerland

- Rue
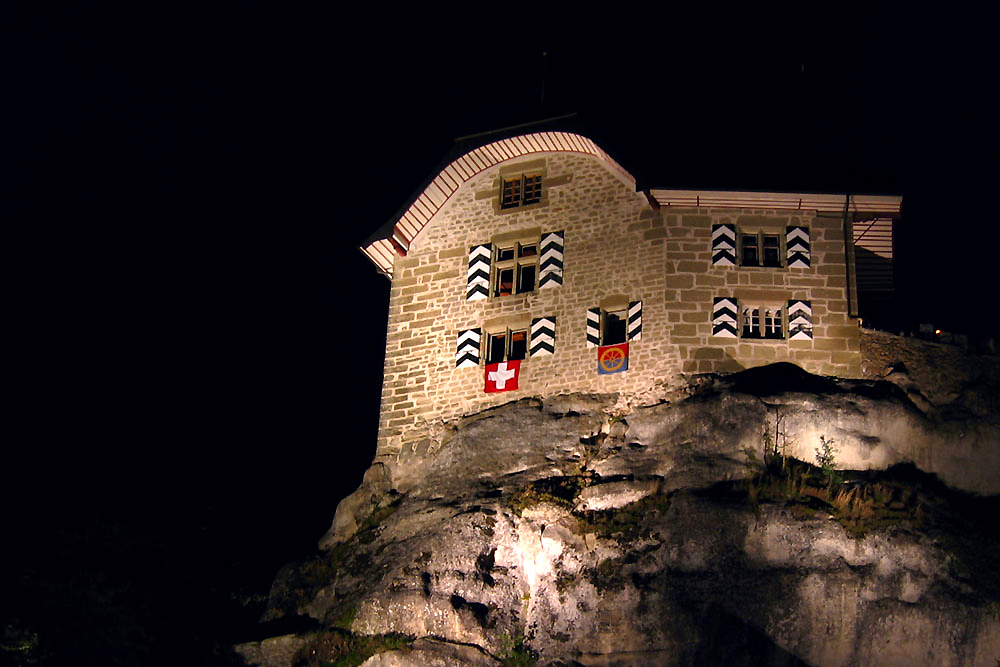
- Rue Castle

Site information
- Code: CH-FR

Location
- Coordinates: 46°37′12″N 6°49′21″E

Rue Castle is a castle in the municipality of Rue of the Canton of Fribourg in Switzerland. It is a Swiss heritage site of national significance.

== See also ==
- List of castles in Switzerland
- Château
