= Vauderens railway station =

Railway station in Ursy, Switzerland

Vauderens
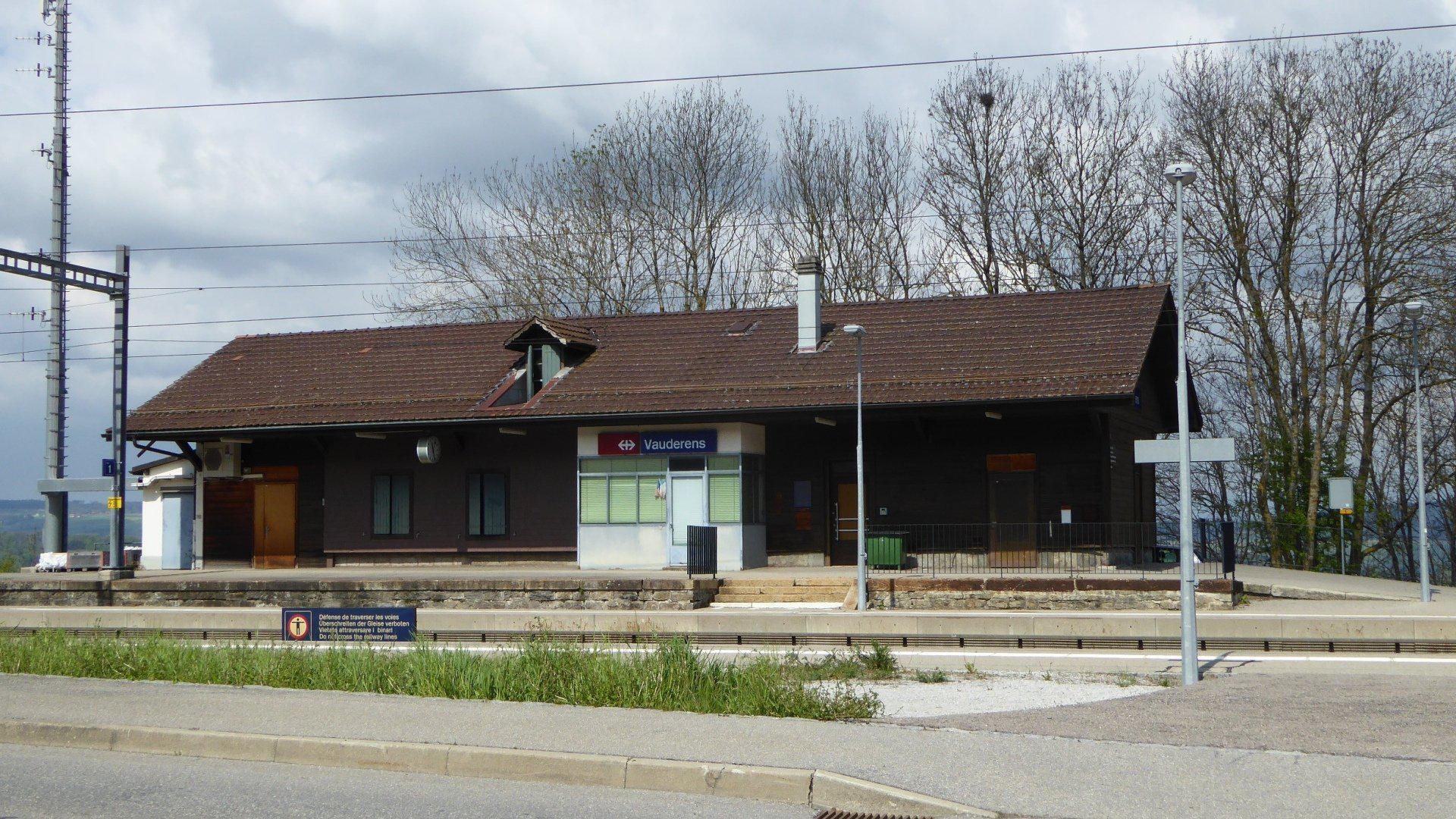
- The station in 2018

General information
- Location: Ursy; Switzerland
- Coordinates: 46°37′17″N 6°51′00″E
- Elevation: 757 m (2,484 ft)
- Owner: Swiss Federal Railways
- Line: Lausanne–Bern line
- Distance: 30.5 km (19.0 mi) from Lausanne
- Platforms: 2 side platforms
- Tracks: 2
- Train operators: Swiss Federal Railways
- Connections: Transports publics Fribourgeois bus line

Construction
- Accessible: Yes

Other information
- Station code: 8504021 (VD)
- Fare zone: 46 (frimobil)

Passengers
- 2023: 80 per weekday (SBB)

Services
Preceding station	RER Fribourg	Following station
Palézieux towards Lausanne	S40	Romont FR towards Fribourg/Freiburg
Location

Vauderens railway station (French: Gare de Vauderens) is a railway station in the municipality of Ursy, in the Swiss canton of Fribourg. It is an intermediate stop on the standard gauge Lausanne–Bern line of Swiss Federal Railways.

== Services ==
As of the December 2024 timetable change, the following services stop at Vauderens:

- RER Fribourg S40: hourly service between Lausanne and Fribourg/Freiburg.
