= Auboranges =

- Former municipality
- Coat of arms
- Location of Auboranges
- Location within Switzerland Location within Canton of Fribourg
- Coordinates: 46°35′N 6°48′E
- Country: Switzerland
- Canton: Fribourg
- District: Glâne

Government
  - Mayor: Syndic

Area
  - Total: 1.91 km^{2} (0.74 sq mi)
- Elevation: 650 m (2,130 ft)

Population (December 2020)
  - Total: 293
  - Density: 153/km^{2} (397/sq mi)
- Time zone: UTC+01:00 (CET)
  - Summer (DST): UTC+02:00 (CEST)
- Postal code: 1673
- SFOS number: 2061
- ISO 3166 code: CH-FR
- Surrounded by: Ecublens, Essertes (VD), Ferlens (VD), Oron-la-Ville (VD), Rue, Servion (VD), Vuibroye (VD)
- Website: www.auboranges.ch

Auboranges (French pronunciation: [obɔʁɑ̃ʒ]; Arpitan: Ôborenjos, locally Ouborindze [obɔˈʁɛ̃dzə]) is a former municipality in the district of Glâne in the canton of Fribourg in Switzerland. On 1 January 2025, the former municipalities of Auboranges, Chapelle and Écublens merged into the municipality of Rue.

== History ==
Auboranges is first mentioned in 1155 as Alburengens.

== Geography ==
Auboranges has an area, as of 2009, of 1.9 square kilometers (0.73 mi^{2}). Of this area, 1.56 km^{2} (0.60 mi^{2}) or 80.8% is used for agricultural purposes, while 0.2 km^{2} (0.077 mi^{2}) or 10.4% is forested. Of the rest of the land, 0.16 km^{2} (0.062 mi^{2}) or 8.3% is settled (buildings or roads).

Of the built up area, housing and buildings made up 3.6% and transportation infrastructure made up 4.7%. Out of the forested land, all of the forested land area is covered with heavy forests. Of the agricultural land, 43.5% is used for growing crops and 36.8% is pastures.

The municipality is located in the Glâne district, on the left of the Broye and on the border with the Canton of Vaud.

== Coat of arms ==
The blazon of the municipal coat of arms is Gules, two Bends wavy Argent lowered and in chief sinister a Cross bottony of the last.

== Demographics ==
Auboranges has a population (as of December 2020) of 293. As of 2008, 4.9% of the population are resident foreign nationals. Over the last 10 years (2000–2010) the population has changed at a rate of 56.7%. Migration accounted for 46.2%, while births and deaths accounted for 13.5%.

Most of the population (as of 2000) speaks French (169 or 94.4%) as their first language, German is the second most common (4 or 2.2%) and Tschechisch is the third (2 or 1.1%).

As of 2008, the population was 47.7% male and 52.3% female. The population was made up of 116 Swiss men (43.6% of the population) and 11 (4.1%) non-Swiss men. There were 129 Swiss women (48.5%) and 10 (3.8%) non-Swiss women. Of the population in the municipality, 56 or about 31.3% were born in Auboranges and lived there in 2000. There were 43 or 24.0% who were born in the same canton, while 62 or 34.6% were born somewhere else in Switzerland, and 15 or 8.4% were born outside of Switzerland.

The age distribution, as of 2000, in Auboranges is; 30 children or 16.8% of the population are between 0 and 9 years old and 18 teenagers or 10.1% are between 10 and 19. Of the adult population, 19 people or 10.6% of the population are between 20 and 29 years old. 39 people or 21.8% are between 30 and 39, 25 people or 14.0% are between 40 and 49, and 17 people or 9.5% are between 50 and 59. The senior population distribution is 21 people or 11.7% of the population are between 60 and 69 years old, 6 people or 3.4% are between 70 and 79, there are 3 people or 1.7% who are between 80 and 89, and there is 1 person who is 90 and older.

As of 2000, there were 67 people who were single and never married in the municipality. There were 101 married individuals, 6 widows or widowers and 5 individuals who are divorced.

As of 2000, there were 62 private households in the municipality, and an average of 2.8 persons per household. There were 8 households that consist of only one person and 3 households with five or more people. In 2000, a total of 62 apartments (89.9% of the total) were permanently occupied, while 4 apartments (5.8%) were seasonally occupied and 3 apartments (4.3%) were empty. As of 2009, the construction rate of new housing units was 11.2 new units per 1000 residents. The vacancy rate for the municipality, in 2010, was 2.06%.

The historical population is given in the following chart:

== Politics ==
In the 2011 federal election the most popular party was the SVP which received 36.1% of the vote. The next three most popular parties were the CVP (23.7%), the SP (18.8%) and the FDP (9.2%).

The SVP lost about 9.6% of the vote when compared to the 2007 Federal election (45.7% in 2007 vs 36.1% in 2011). The CVP moved from third in 2007 (with 17.0%) to second in 2011, the SPS moved from fourth in 2007 (with 11.9%) to third and the FDP moved from second in 2007 (with 18.2%) to fourth. A total of 95 votes were cast in this election, of which 1 or 1.1% was invalid.

== Economy ==
As of 2010, Auboranges had an unemployment rate of 2.6%. As of 2008, there were 17 people employed in the primary economic sector and about 8 businesses involved in this sector. 15 people were employed in the secondary sector and there were 4 businesses in this sector. 3 people were employed in the tertiary sector, with 3 businesses in this sector. There were 93 residents of the municipality who were employed in some capacity, of which females made up 38.7% of the workforce.

In 2008 the total number of full-time equivalent jobs was 32. The number of jobs in the primary sector was 14, all of which were in agriculture. The number of jobs in the secondary sector was 15 of which 7 or (46.7%) were in manufacturing and 8 (53.3%) were in construction. The number of jobs in the tertiary sector was 3. In the tertiary sector; 1 was in the sale or repair of motor vehicles, 1 was in education.

In 2000, there were 8 workers who commuted into the municipality and 71 workers who commuted away. The municipality is a net exporter of workers, with about 8.9 workers leaving the municipality for every one entering. Of the working population, 3.2% used public transportation to get to work, and 74.2% used a private car.

== Religion ==
From the 2000 census, 109 or 60.9% were Roman Catholic, while 26 or 14.5% belonged to the Swiss Reformed Church. There were 2 (or about 1.12% of the population) who were Islamic. 40 (or about 22.35% of the population) belonged to no church, are agnostic or atheist, and 2 individuals (or about 1.12% of the population) did not answer the question.

== Education ==
In Auboranges about 68 or (38.0%) of the population have completed non-mandatory upper secondary education, and 19 or (10.6%) have completed additional higher education (either university or a Fachhochschule). Of the 19 who completed tertiary schooling, 57.9% were Swiss men, 36.8% were Swiss women.

The Canton of Fribourg school system provides one year of non-obligatory Kindergarten, followed by six years of Primary school. This is followed by three years of obligatory lower Secondary school where the students are separated according to ability and aptitude. Following the lower Secondary students may attend a three or four year optional upper Secondary school. The upper Secondary school is divided into gymnasium (university preparatory) and vocational programs. After they finish the upper Secondary program, students may choose to attend a Tertiary school or continue their apprenticeship.

During the 2010-11 school year, there were a total of 15 students attending one class in Auboranges. A total of 59 students from the municipality attended any school, either in the municipality or outside of it. There were no kindergarten classes in the municipality, but 6 students attended kindergarten in a neighboring municipality. The municipality had one primary class and 15 students. During the same year, there were no lower secondary classes in the municipality, but 14 students attended lower secondary school in a neighboring municipality. There were no upper Secondary classes or vocational classes, but there were 5 upper Secondary students and 4 upper Secondary vocational students who attended classes in another municipality. The municipality had no non-university Tertiary classes, but there were 3 specialized Tertiary students who attended classes in another municipality.

As of 2000, there were 15 students in Auboranges who came from another municipality, while 19 residents attended schools outside the municipality.
