= Ursy =

- Municipality
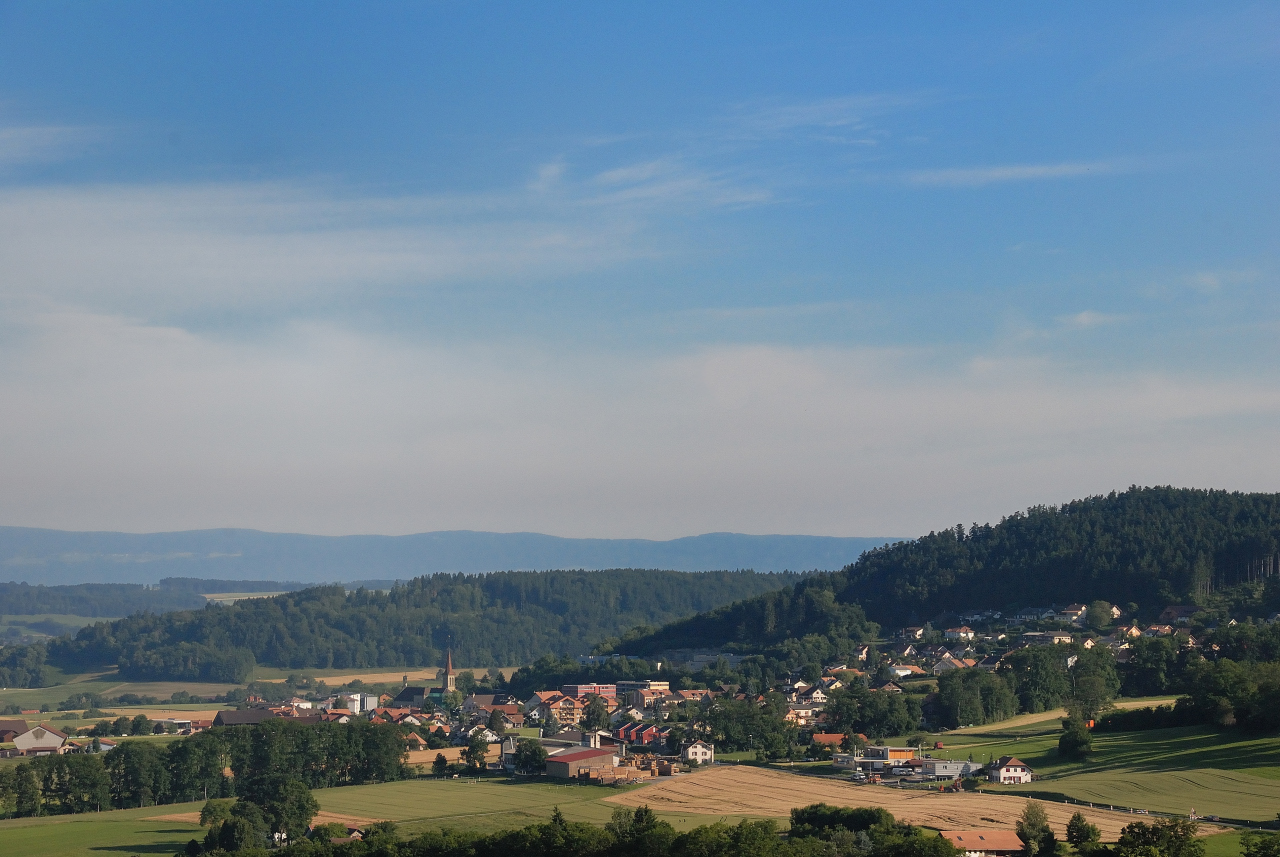
- Ursy village

- Flag Coat of arms
- Location of Ursy
- Location within Switzerland Location within Canton of Fribourg
- Coordinates: 46°38′N 6°50′E
- Country: Switzerland
- Canton: Fribourg
- District: Glâne

Government
  - Mayor: Syndic

Area
  - Total: 8.92 km^{2} (3.44 sq mi)
- Elevation: 704 m (2,310 ft)

Population (December 2020)
  - Total: 3,299
  - Density: 370/km^{2} (958/sq mi)
- Time zone: UTC+01:00 (CET)
  - Summer (DST): UTC+02:00 (CEST)
- Postal codes: 1670 Ursy; 1675 Vauderens
- SFOS number: 2102
- ISO 3166 code: CH-FR
- Surrounded by: Esmonts, Le Flon, Rue, Siviriez, Vuarmarens
- Website: www.ursy.ch

Ursy (French: [yʁsi]; Arpitan: Ursi [yˈʃi]) is a municipality in the district of Glâne in the canton of Fribourg in Switzerland.

== History ==
Ursy is first mentioned in 1160 as Ursei.

== Geography ==
Ursy has an area, as of 2009, of 8.9 square kilometers (3.4 mi^{2}). Of this area, 5.94 km^{2} (2.29 mi^{2}) or 66.5% is used for agricultural purposes, while 2.15 km^{2} (0.83 mi^{2}) or 24.1% is forested. Of the rest of the land, 0.83 km^{2} (0.32 mi^{2}) or 9.3% is settled (buildings or roads). After the 2012 merger of Vuarmarens, the area was 14.96 square kilometers (5.78 mi^{2}).

Of the built up area, housing and buildings made up 5.4% and transportation infrastructure made up 2.4%. Out of the forested land, all of the forested land area is covered with heavy forests. Of the agricultural land, 33.5% is used for growing crops and 31.8% is pastures, while 1.2% is used for orchards or vine crops.

On 1 January 2001 the former municipalities of Vauderens, Bionnens and Mossel merged into the municipality of Ursy. The municipality of Vuarmarens merged on 1 January 2012 into the municipality of Ursy.

On 1 January 2025 the former municipality of Montet merged into the municipality of Ursy.

== Coat of arms ==
Ursy retained its traditional coat of arms after the mergers with Bionnens, Mossel and Vauderens: per fess, gules a cross bottony argent, and or a bear sable passant, langued of the first.

== Demographics ==
Ursy has a population (as of December 2020) of 3,299. As of 2008, 12.4% of the population are resident foreign nationals. Over the last 10 years (2000–2010) the population has changed at a rate of 20.8%. Migration accounted for 15.8%, while births and deaths accounted for 4.3%.

Most of the population (as of 2000) speaks French (668 or 88.0%) as their first language, Portuguese is the second most common (36 or 4.7%) and Albanian is the third (26 or 3.4%). There are 14 people who speak German, 7 people who speak Italian.

As of 2008, the population was 48.4% male and 51.6% female. The population was made up of 739 Swiss men (42.5% of the population) and 104 (6.0%) non-Swiss men. There were 774 Swiss women (44.5%) and 123 (7.1%) non-Swiss women. Of the population in the municipality, 218 or about 28.7% were born in Ursy and lived there in 2000. There were 246 or 32.4% who were born in the same canton, while 171 or 22.5% were born somewhere else in Switzerland, and 112 or 14.8% were born outside of Switzerland.

As of 2000, children and teenagers (0–19 years old) make up 29.6% of the population, while adults (20–64 years old) make up 57.9% and seniors (over 64 years old) make up 12.4%.

As of 2000, there were 344 people who were single and never married in the municipality. There were 349 married individuals, 44 widows or widowers and 22 individuals who are divorced.

As of 2000, there were 505 private households in the municipality, and an average of 2.7 persons per household. There were 72 households that consist of only one person and 43 households with five or more people. In 2000, a total of 258 apartments (79.6% of the total) were permanently occupied, while 48 apartments (14.8%) were seasonally occupied and 18 apartments (5.6%) were empty. As of 2009, the construction rate of new housing units was 7.4 new units per 1000 residents. The vacancy rate for the municipality, in 2010, was 1.2%.

The historical population is given in the following chart:

== Heritage sites of national significance ==
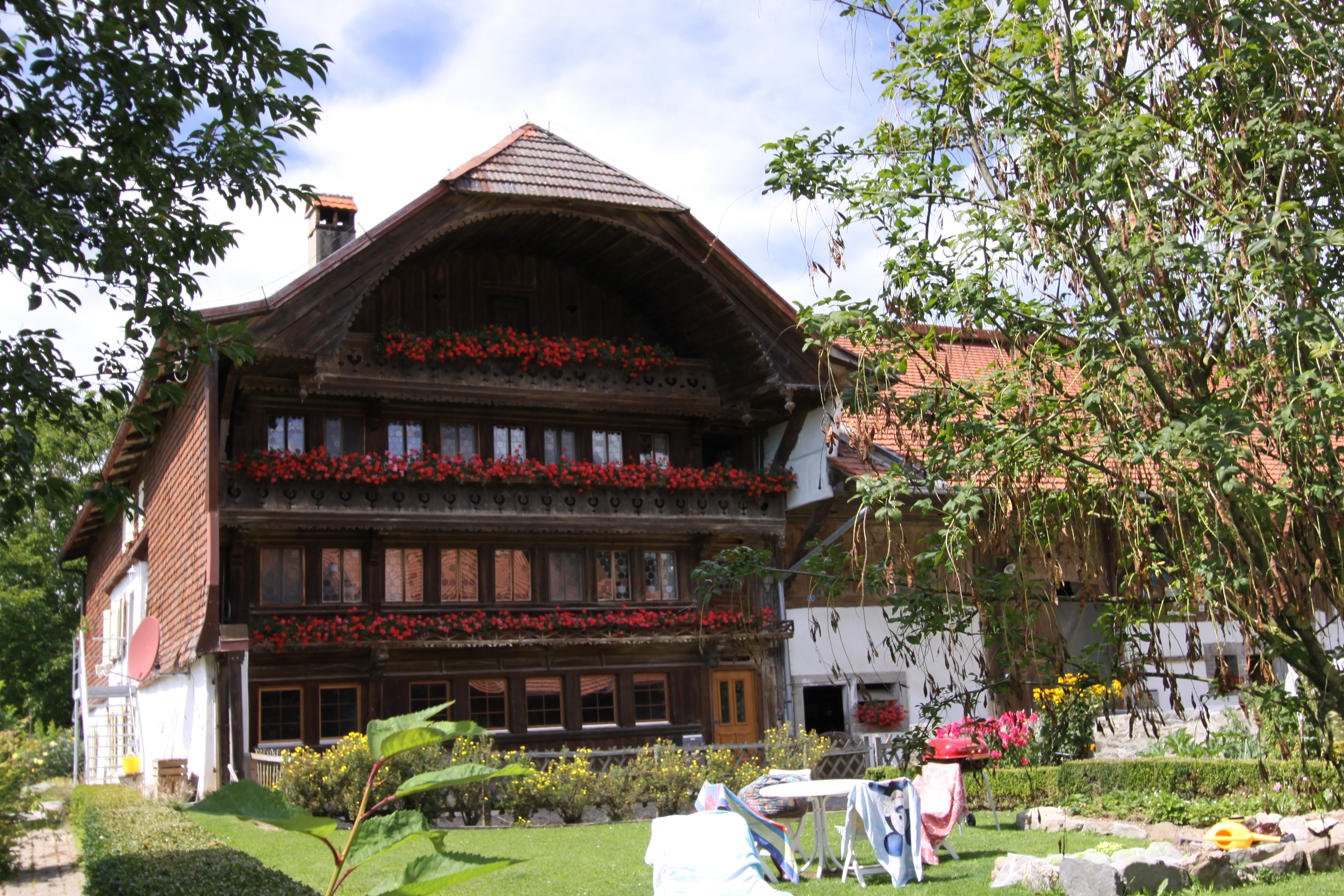
D’Invau farm house

The D’Invau farm house is listed as a Swiss heritage site of national significance.

== Politics ==
In the 2011 federal election the most popular party was the CVP which received 27.5% of the vote. The next three most popular parties were the SP (25.9%), the SVP (20.7%) and the FDP (5.9%).

The CVP improved their position in Ursy rising to first, from second in 2007 (with 24.9%) The SPS moved from first in 2007 (with 26.4%) to second in 2011, the SVP retained about the same popularity (23.6% in 2007) and the FDP retained about the same popularity (9.5% in 2007). A total of 481 votes were cast in this election, of which 5 or 1.0% were invalid.

== Economy ==
As of 2010, Ursy had an unemployment rate of 3.8%. As of 2008, there were 68 people employed in the primary economic sector and about 27 businesses involved in this sector. 173 people were employed in the secondary sector and there were 23 businesses in this sector. 454 people were employed in the tertiary sector, with 43 businesses in this sector. There were 331 residents of the municipality who were employed in some capacity, of which females made up 36.9% of the workforce.

In 2008 the total number of full-time equivalent jobs was 600. The number of jobs in the primary sector was 54, of which 52 were in agriculture and 1 was in forestry or lumber production. The number of jobs in the secondary sector was 161 of which 47 or (29.2%) were in manufacturing and 113 (70.2%) were in construction. The number of jobs in the tertiary sector was 385. In the tertiary sector; 247 or 64.2% were in wholesale or retail sales or the repair of motor vehicles, 10 or 2.6% were in the movement and storage of goods, 9 or 2.3% were in a hotel or restaurant, 4 or 1.0% were in the information industry, 2 or 0.5% were the insurance or financial industry, 31 or 8.1% were technical professionals or scientists, 11 or 2.9% were in education and 61 or 15.8% were in health care.

In 2000, there were 351 workers who commuted into the municipality and 198 workers who commuted away. The municipality is a net importer of workers, with about 1.8 workers entering the municipality for every one leaving. Of the working population, 7.7% used public transportation to get to work, and 62.8% used a private car.

== Religion ==
From the 2000 census, 586 or 77.2% were Roman Catholic, while 66 or 8.7% belonged to the Swiss Reformed Church. Of the rest of the population, there were 36 individuals (or about 4.74% of the population) who belonged to another Christian church. There were 30 (or about 3.95% of the population) who were Islamic. 30 (or about 3.95% of the population) belonged to no church, are agnostic or atheist, and 26 individuals (or about 3.43% of the population) did not answer the question.

== Education ==
In Ursy about 235 or (31.0%) of the population have completed non-mandatory upper secondary education, and 55 or (7.2%) have completed additional higher education (either university or a Fachhochschule). Of the 55 who completed tertiary schooling, 81.8% were Swiss men, 18.2% were Swiss women.

The Canton of Fribourg school system provides one year of non-obligatory Kindergarten, followed by six years of Primary school. This is followed by three years of obligatory lower Secondary school where the students are separated according to ability and aptitude. Following the lower Secondary students may attend a three or four year optional upper Secondary school. The upper Secondary school is divided into gymnasium (university preparatory) and vocational programs. After they finish the upper Secondary program, students may choose to attend a Tertiary school or continue their apprenticeship.

During the 2010–11 school year, there were a total of 195 students attending 10 classes in Ursy. A total of 356 students from the municipality attended any school, either in the municipality or outside of it. There were 2 kindergarten classes with a total of 44 students in the municipality. The municipality had 8 primary classes and 151 students. During the same year, there were no lower secondary classes in the municipality, but 79 students attended lower secondary school in a neighboring municipality. There were no upper Secondary classes or vocational classes, but there were 34 upper Secondary students and 42 upper Secondary vocational students who attended classes in another municipality. The municipality had no non-university Tertiary classes, but there were 2 non-university Tertiary students and 4 specialized Tertiary students who attended classes in another municipality.

As of 2000, there were 42 students in Ursy who came from another municipality, while 76 residents attended schools outside the municipality.

== Transportation ==
The municipality has a railway station, Vauderens, on the Lausanne–Bern line. It has limited service to Romont FR and Allaman.
