= Chapelle, Glâne =

Chapelle
- Former municipality
- Coat of arms
- Location of Chapelle
- Location within Switzerland Location within Canton of Fribourg
- Coordinates: 46°35′N 6°50′E
- Country: Switzerland
- Canton: Fribourg
- District: Glâne

Government
  - Mayor: Syndic

Area
  - Total: 2.03 km^{2} (0.78 sq mi)
- Elevation: 739 m (2,425 ft)

Population (December 2020)
  - Total: 320
  - Density: 160/km^{2} (410/sq mi)
- Time zone: UTC+01:00 (CET)
  - Summer (DST): UTC+02:00 (CEST)
- Postal code: 1608
- SFOS number: 2066
- ISO 3166 code: CH-FR
- Surrounded by: Chesalles-sur-Oron (VD), Le Flon, Oron-la-Ville (VD), Oron-le-Châtel (VD), Rue
- Website: SFSO statistics

Chapelle (French pronunciation: [ʃapɛl]; Arpitan: Chapèla, locally Tsapala [tsaˈpala]) is a former municipality in the district of Glâne in the canton of Fribourg in Switzerland.

Since 2005, Chapelle (Broye) in the same canton is part of the municipality of Cheiry.

On 1 January 2025, the former municipalities of Auboranges, Chapelle and Écublens merged into the municipality of Rue.

== History ==
Chapelle (Glâne) is first mentioned in 1354 as Capella. Until 1953 it was officially known as Chapelle-sur-Gillarens.

== Geography ==
Chapelle (Glâne) has an area, as of 2009, of 2 square kilometers (0.77 mi^{2}). Of this area, 1.45 km^{2} (0.56 mi^{2}) or 71.4% is used for agricultural purposes, while 0.41 km^{2} (0.16 mi^{2}) or 20.2% is forested. Of the rest of the land, 0.17 km^{2} (0.066 mi^{2}) or 8.4% is settled (buildings or roads).

Of the built up area, housing and buildings made up 2.5% and transportation infrastructure made up 5.9%. Out of the forested land, 18.7% of the total land area is heavily forested and 1.5% is covered with orchards or small clusters of trees. Of the agricultural land, 26.1% is used for growing crops and 43.8% is pastures, while 1.5% is used for orchards or vine crops.

The municipality is located in the Glâne District, in the Broye valley.

== Coat of arms ==
The blazon of the municipal coat of arms is Gules, on a Saltire Or an Escallop Sable.

== Demographics ==
Chapelle (Glâne) has a population (as of December 2020) of 320. As of 2008, 8.5% of the population are resident foreign nationals. Over the last 10 years (2000–2010) the population has changed at a rate of 21.8%. Migration accounted for 18.8%, while births and deaths accounted for 4.6%.

Most of the population (as of 2000) speaks French (183 or 92.4%) as their first language, German is the second most common (13 or 6.6%) and Italian is the third (1 or 0.5%).

As of 2008, the population was 51.9% male and 48.1% female. The population was made up of 115 Swiss men (48.1% of the population) and 9 (3.8%) non-Swiss men. There were 101 Swiss women (42.3%) and 14 (5.9%) non-Swiss women. Of the population in the municipality, 55 or about 27.8% were born in Chapelle (Glâne) and lived there in 2000. There were 33 or 16.7% who were born in the same canton, while 91 or 46.0% were born somewhere else in Switzerland, and 15 or 7.6% were born outside of Switzerland.

The age distribution, as of 2000, in Chapelle (Glâne) is; 29 children or 14.6% of the population are between 0 and 9 years old and 29 teenagers or 14.6% are between 10 and 19. Of the adult population, 12 people or 6.1% of the population are between 20 and 29 years old. 25 people or 12.6% are between 30 and 39, 40 people or 20.2% are between 40 and 49, and 26 people or 13.1% are between 50 and 59. The senior population distribution is 17 people or 8.6% of the population are between 60 and 69 years old, 12 people or 6.1% are between 70 and 79, there are 7 people or 3.5% who are between 80 and 89, and there is 1 person who is 90 and older.

As of 2000, there were 82 people who were single and never married in the municipality. There were 99 married individuals, 9 widows or widowers and 8 individuals who are divorced.

As of 2000, there were 70 private households in the municipality, and an average of 2.8 persons per household. There were 13 households that consist of only one person and 7 households with five or more people. In 2000, a total of 68 apartments (91.9% of the total) were permanently occupied, while 4 apartments (5.4%) were seasonally occupied and 2 apartments (2.7%) were empty. The vacancy rate for the municipality, in 2010, was 1.1%.

The historical population is given in the following chart:

== Politics ==
In the 2011 federal election the most popular party was the CVP which received 28.6% of the vote. The next three most popular parties were the SVP (28.3%), the SP (15.4%) and the FDP (7.2%).

The CVP received about the same percentage of the vote as they did in the 2007 Federal election (27.5% in 2007 vs 28.6% in 2011). The SVP retained about the same popularity (27.4% in 2007), the SPS lost popularity (23.2% in 2007) and the FDP moved from below fourth place in 2007 to fourth. A total of 101 votes were cast in this election, of which 1 or 1.0% was invalid.

== Economy ==
As of 2010, Chapelle (Glâne) had an unemployment rate of 1.3%. As of 2008, there were 17 people employed in the primary economic sector and about 8 businesses involved in this sector. 1 person was employed in the secondary sector and there was 1 business in this sector. 13 people were employed in the tertiary sector, with 4 businesses in this sector. There were 97 residents of the municipality who were employed in some capacity, of which females made up 49.5% of the workforce.

In 2008 the total number of full-time equivalent jobs was 19. The number of jobs in the primary sector was 12, all of which were in agriculture. The number of jobs in the secondary sector was 1, in construction. The number of jobs in the tertiary sector was 6 of which 1 was in the sale or repair of motor vehicles and 3 were in education.

In 2000, there were 2 workers who commuted into the municipality and 76 workers who commuted away. The municipality is a net exporter of workers, with about 38.0 workers leaving the municipality for every one entering. Of the working population, 8.2% used public transportation to get to work, and 69.1% used a private car.

== Religion ==
From the 2000 census, 120 or 60.6% were Roman Catholic, while 43 or 21.7% belonged to the Swiss Reformed Church. Of the rest of the population, there were 12 individuals (or about 6.06% of the population) who belonged to another Christian church. There were 2 individuals who belonged to another church. 20 (or about 10.10% of the population) belonged to no church, are agnostic or atheist, and 7 individuals (or about 3.54% of the population) did not answer the question.

== Education ==
In Chapelle (Glâne) about 64 or (32.3%) of the population have completed non-mandatory upper secondary education, and 26 or (13.1%) have completed additional higher education (either university or a Fachhochschule). Of the 26 who completed tertiary schooling, 57.7% were Swiss men, 34.6% were Swiss women.

The Canton of Fribourg school system provides one year of non-obligatory Kindergarten, followed by six years of Primary school. This is followed by three years of obligatory lower Secondary school where the students are separated according to ability and aptitude. Following the lower Secondary students may attend a three or four year optional upper Secondary school. The upper Secondary school is divided into gymnasium (university preparatory) and vocational programs. After they finish the upper Secondary program, students may choose to attend a Tertiary school or continue their apprenticeship.

During the 2010-11 school year, there were a total of 41 students attending 2 classes in Chapelle (Glâne). A total of 50 students from the municipality attended any school, either in the municipality or outside of it. There was one kindergarten class with a total of 23 students in the municipality. The municipality had one primary class and 18 students. During the same year, there were no lower secondary classes in the municipality, but 14 students attended lower secondary school in a neighboring municipality. There were no upper Secondary classes or vocational classes, but there were 7 upper Secondary students and 2 upper Secondary vocational students who attended classes in another municipality. The municipality had no non-university Tertiary classes. who attended classes in another municipality.

As of 2000, there were 17 students in Chapelle (Glâne) who came from another municipality, while 35 residents attended schools outside the municipality.
