= Écublens, Fribourg =

Écublens
- Former municipality
- Coat of arms
- Location of Écublens
- Location within Switzerland Location within Canton of Fribourg
- Coordinates: 46°36′N 6°49′E
- Country: Switzerland
- Canton: Fribourg
- District: Glâne

Government
  - Mayor: Syndic

Area
  - Total: 4.87 km^{2} (1.88 sq mi)
- Elevation: 594 m (1,949 ft)

Population (December 2020)
  - Total: 356
  - Density: 73.1/km^{2} (189/sq mi)
- Time zone: UTC+01:00 (CET)
  - Summer (DST): UTC+02:00 (CEST)
- Postal code: 1673
- SFOS number: 2072
- ISO 3166 code: CH-FR
- Surrounded by: Auboranges, Ferlens (VD), Montet (Glâne), Rue, Vulliens (VD)
- Website: SFSO statistics

Écublens (French: [ekyblɑ̃]; Arpitan: Ècubllens, locally Ekubyin [ekyˈbjɛ̃]) is a former municipality in the district of Glâne in the canton of Fribourg in Switzerland. On 1 January 2025, the former municipalities of Auboranges, Chapelle and Écublens merged into the municipality of Rue.

== History ==
Ecublens is first mentioned in 1180 as Escublens. The municipality was formerly known by its German name Scubilingen, however, that name is no longer used.

== Geography ==
Ecublens has an area, as of 2009, of 4.9 square kilometers (1.9 mi^{2}). Of this area, 3.19 km^{2} (1.23 mi^{2}) or 65.1% is used for agricultural purposes, while 1.17 km^{2} (0.45 mi^{2}) or 23.9% is forested. Of the rest of the land, 0.41 km^{2} (0.16 mi^{2}) or 8.4% is settled (buildings or roads), 0.1 km^{2} (25 acres) or 2.0% is either rivers or lakes.

Of the built up area, housing and buildings made up 3.9% and transportation infrastructure made up 4.3%. Out of the forested land, all of the forested land area is covered with heavy forests. Of the agricultural land, 43.5% is used for growing crops and 20.8% is pastures. All the water in the municipality is flowing water.

The municipality is located on the border with the Canton of Vaud and on the left bank of the Broye. It consists of the linear village of Ecublens and the hamlets of Eschiens and Villangeaux. From 1883 until their merger in 1969, all three communities were independent municipalities that were administered together.

== Coat of arms ==
The blazon of the municipal coat of arms is Or, a Key in pale Gules.

== Demographics ==
Ecublens has a population (as of December 2020) of 356. As of 2008, 6.1% of the population are resident foreign nationals. Over the last 10 years (2000–2010) the population has changed at a rate of 5.3%. Migration accounted for 3%, while births and deaths accounted for 3.8%.

Most of the population (as of 2000) speaks French (243 or 91.4%) as their first language, English is the second most common (9 or 3.4%) and German is the third (7 or 2.6%). There are 3 people who speak Italian.

As of 2008, the population was 48.6% male and 51.4% female. The population was made up of 131 Swiss men (46.1% of the population) and 7 (2.5%) non-Swiss men. There were 135 Swiss women (47.5%) and 11 (3.9%) non-Swiss women. Of the population in the municipality, 110 or about 41.4% were born in Ecublens and lived there in 2000. There were 40 or 15.0% who were born in the same canton, while 94 or 35.3% were born somewhere else in Switzerland, and 21 or 7.9% were born outside of Switzerland.

The age distribution, as of 2000, in Ecublens is; 43 children or 16.2% of the population are between 0 and 9 years old and 49 teenagers or 18.4% are between 10 and 19. Of the adult population, 22 people or 8.3% of the population are between 20 and 29 years old. 35 people or 13.2% are between 30 and 39, 57 people or 21.4% are between 40 and 49, and 19 people or 7.1% are between 50 and 59. The senior population distribution is 21 people or 7.9% of the population are between 60 and 69 years old, 16 people or 6.0% are between 70 and 79, there are 4 people or 1.5% who are between 80 and 89.

As of 2000, there were 128 people who were single and never married in the municipality. There were 104 married individuals, 22 widows or widowers and 12 individuals who are divorced.

As of 2000, there were 92 private households in the municipality, and an average of 2.8 persons per household. There were 27 households that consist of only one person and 15 households with five or more people. In 2000, a total of 82 apartments (83.7% of the total) were permanently occupied, while 11 apartments (11.2%) were seasonally occupied and 5 apartments (5.1%) were empty. As of 2009, the construction rate of new housing units was 7.2 new units per 1000 residents.

The historical population is given in the following chart:

== Politics ==
In the 2011 federal election the most popular party was the CVP which received 39.3% of the vote. The next three most popular parties were the SP (23.9%), the SVP (14.9%) and the FDP (7.8%).

The CVP received about the same percentage of the vote as they did in the 2007 Federal election (41.4% in 2007 vs 39.3% in 2011). The SPS moved from third in 2007 (with 17.9%) to second in 2011, the SVP moved from second in 2007 (with 25.8%) to third and the FDP retained about the same popularity (7.8% in 2007). A total of 106 votes were cast in this election, of which 2 or 1.9% were invalid.

== Economy ==
As of 2010, Ecublens had an unemployment rate of 6.2%. As of 2008, there were 34 people employed in the primary economic sector and about 12 businesses involved in this sector. 5 people were employed in the secondary sector and there were 3 businesses in this sector. 10 people were employed in the tertiary sector, with 5 businesses in this sector. There were 130 residents of the municipality who were employed in some capacity, of which females made up 40.8% of the workforce.

In 2008 the total number of full-time equivalent jobs was 43. The number of jobs in the primary sector was 28, all of which were in agriculture. The number of jobs in the secondary sector was 5 of which 3 were in manufacturing. The number of jobs in the tertiary sector was 10. In the tertiary sector; 5 were in wholesale or retail sales or the repair of motor vehicles, 1 was in a hotel or restaurant, 1 was a technical professional or scientist and 1 was in education.

In 2000, there were 16 workers who commuted into the municipality and 75 workers who commuted away. The municipality is a net exporter of workers, with about 4.7 workers leaving the municipality for every one entering. Of the working population, 8.5% used public transportation to get to work, and 48.5% used a private car.

== Religion ==
From the 2000 census, 179 or 67.3% were Roman Catholic, while 50 or 18.8% belonged to the Swiss Reformed Church. Of the rest of the population, there was 1 member of an Orthodox church, and there were 6 individuals (or about 2.26% of the population) who belonged to another Christian church. 31 (or about 11.65% of the population) belonged to no church, are agnostic or atheist, and 2 individuals (or about 0.75% of the population) did not answer the question.

== Education ==
In Ecublens about 89 or (33.5%) of the population have completed non-mandatory upper secondary education, and 23 or (8.6%) have completed additional higher education (either university or a Fachhochschule). Of the 23 who completed tertiary schooling, 65.2% were Swiss men, 17.4% were Swiss women.

The Canton of Fribourg school system provides one year of non-obligatory Kindergarten, followed by six years of Primary school. This is followed by three years of obligatory lower Secondary school where the students are separated according to ability and aptitude. Following the lower Secondary students may attend a three or four year optional upper Secondary school. The upper Secondary school is divided into gymnasium (university preparatory) and vocational programs. After they finish the upper Secondary program, students may choose to attend a Tertiary school or continue their apprenticeship.

During the 2010-11 school year, there were a total of 21 students attending one class in Ecublens. A total of 52 students from the municipality attended any school, either in the municipality or outside of it. There were no kindergarten classes in the municipality, but 2 students attended kindergarten in a neighboring municipality. The municipality had one primary class and 21 students. During the same year, there were no lower secondary classes in the municipality, but 13 students attended lower secondary school in a neighboring municipality. There were no upper Secondary classes or vocational classes, but there were 8 upper Secondary students and 4 upper Secondary vocational students who attended classes in another municipality. The municipality had no non-university Tertiary classes, but there were 4 non-university Tertiary students and 2 specialized Tertiary students who attended classes in another municipality.

As of 2000, there were 15 students in Ecublens who came from another municipality, while 46 residents attended schools outside the municipality.

== Transportation ==
The municipality has a railway station, Ecublens-Rue, on the Palézieux–Lyss railway line. It has regular service to Lausanne, Palézieux, Payerne, and Kerzers.
