= Rue, Switzerland =

Rue
- Municipality
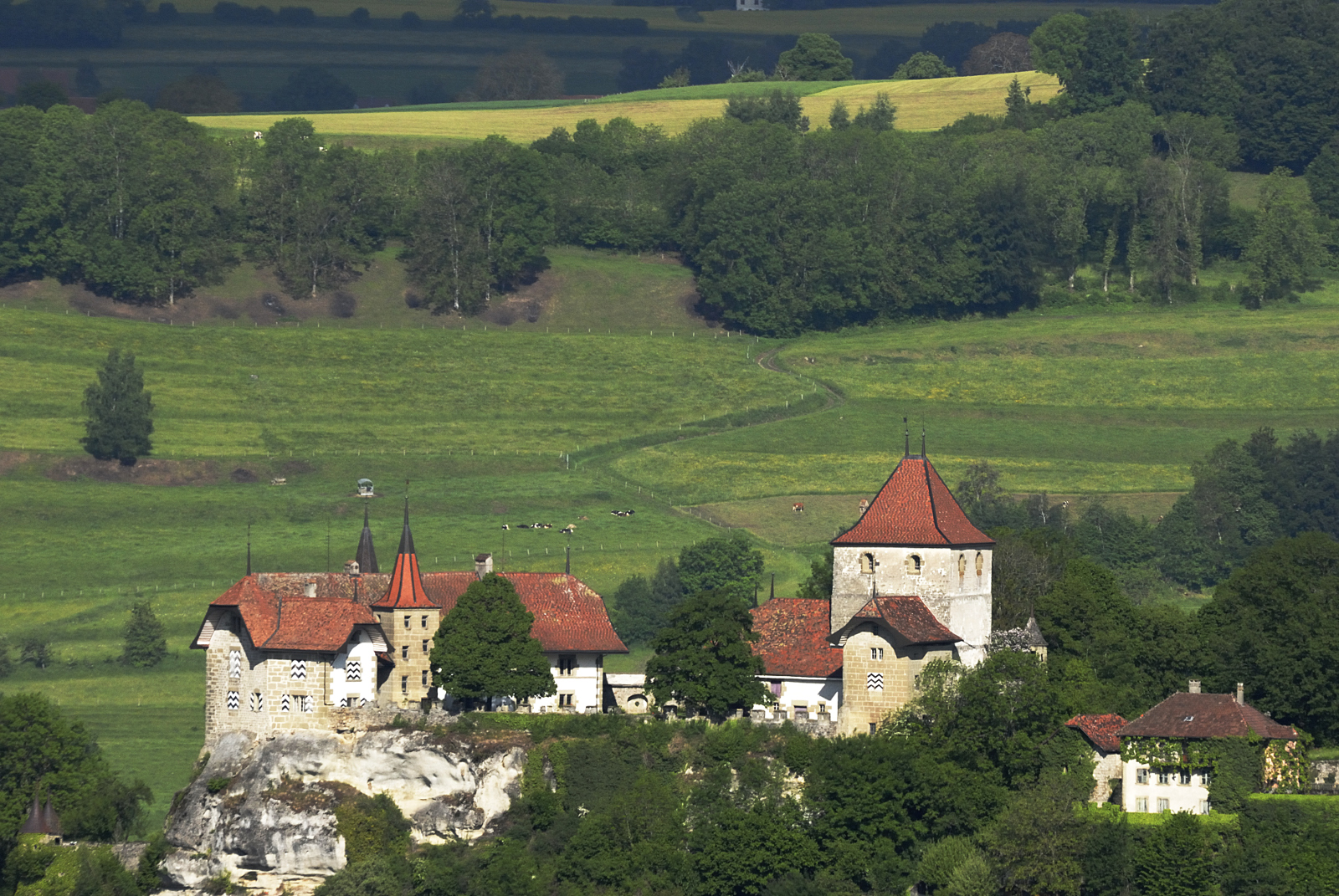
- Rue castle above the village

- Coat of arms
- Location of Rue
- Location within Switzerland Location within Canton of Fribourg
- Coordinates: 46°37′N 6°49′E
- Country: Switzerland
- Canton: Fribourg
- District: Glâne

Government
  - Mayor: Syndic

Area
  - Total: 11.20 km^{2} (4.32 sq mi)
- Elevation: 675 m (2,215 ft)

Population (December 2020)
  - Total: 1,537
  - Density: 137.2/km^{2} (355.4/sq mi)
- Time zone: UTC+01:00 (CET)
  - Summer (DST): UTC+02:00 (CEST)
- Postal code: 1673
- SFOS number: 2097
- ISO 3166 code: CH-FR
- Surrounded by: Auboranges, Chapelle (Glâne), Ecublens, Le Flon, Montet (Glâne), Oron-la-Ville (VD), Ursy, Vuarmarens
- Website: www.rue.ch

Rue (French: [ʁy]; Arpitan: Ruva [ˈʁyva]) is a municipality in the district of Glâne in the canton of Fribourg in Switzerland. On 1 January 1993 the former municipality of Blessens merged into Rue, followed by Promasens and Gillarens in 2001. On 1 January 2025, the former municipalities of Auboranges, Chapelle and Écublens merged into the municipality of Rue.

== History ==
Rue is first mentioned in 1152 as Rota. The municipality was formerly known by its German name Rüw, however, that name is no longer used.

== Geography ==
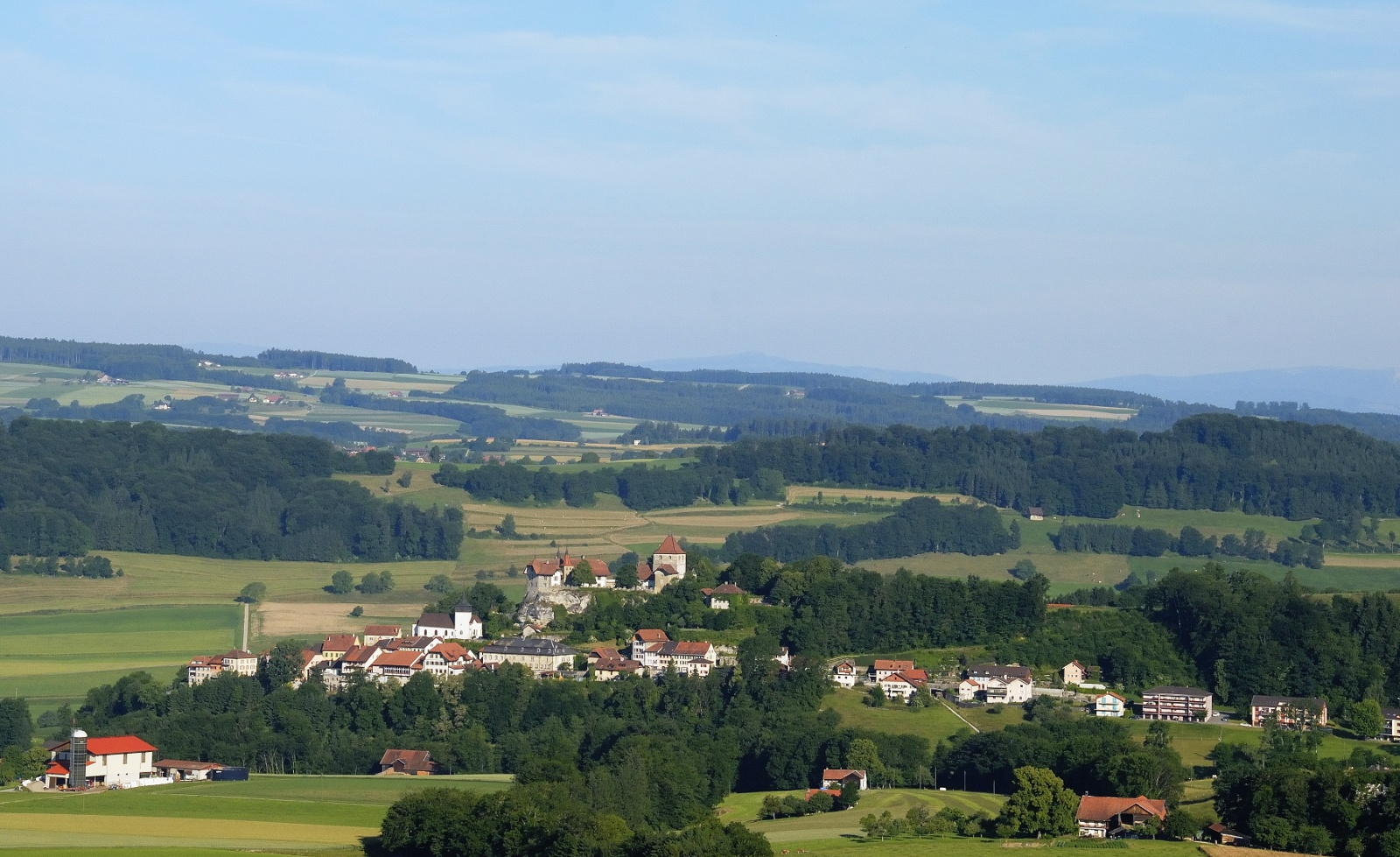
Rue and its surroundings

Aerial view (1949)

Rue has an area, as of 2009, of 11.2 square kilometers (4.3 mi^{2}). Of this area, 8.07 km^{2} (3.12 mi^{2}) or 72.0% is used for agricultural purposes, while 2.11 km^{2} (0.81 mi^{2}) or 18.8% is forested. Of the rest of the land, 0.98 km^{2} (0.38 mi^{2}) or 8.7% is settled (buildings or roads), 0.07 km^{2} (17 acres) or 0.6% is either rivers or lakes and 0.01 km^{2} (2.5 acres) or 0.1% is unproductive land. Of the built up area, housing and buildings made up 4.3% and transportation infrastructure made up 3.8%. Out of the forested land, 15.3% of the total land area is heavily forested and 3.5% is covered with orchards or small clusters of trees. Of the agricultural land, 36.8% is used for growing crops and 33.8% is pastures, while 1.3% is used for orchards or vine crops. All the water in the municipality is flowing water.

The municipality is located along the upper portion of the Broye. It consists of the villages of Rue, Blessens, Promasens and Gillarens. Blessens was incorporated in 1993, followed in 2001 by Promasens and Gillarens.

== Coat of arms ==
The blazon of the municipal coat of arms is Per pale Gules and azure, overall a Wheel Or. Rue kept the same coat of arms when Blessens merged into Rue in 1993 and in 2001 when Promasens and Gillarens merged into it.

== Demographics ==
Rue has a population (as of December 2020) of 1,537. As of 2008, 8.3% of the population are resident foreign nationals. Over the last 10 years (2000–2010) the population has changed at a rate of 23.5%. Migration accounted for 17.9%, while births and deaths accounted for 4.1%.

Most of the population (as of 2000) speaks French (507 or 96.6%) as their first language, German is the second most common (9 or 1.7%) and Portuguese is the third (6 or 1.1%). There are 2 people who speak Italian.

As of 2008, the population was made up of 1,111 Swiss citizens and 100 non-citizen residents (8.26% of the population). Of the population in the municipality, 210 or about 40.0% were born in Rue and lived there in 2000. There were 148 or 28.2% who were born in the same canton, while 132 or 25.1% were born somewhere else in Switzerland, and 32 or 6.1% were born outside of Switzerland.

As of 2000, children and teenagers (0–19 years old) make up 25.8% of the population, while adults (20–64 years old) make up 60.9% and seniors (over 64 years old) make up 13.3%.

As of 2000, there were 232 people who were single and never married in the municipality. There were 241 married individuals, 26 widows or widowers and 26 individuals who are divorced.

As of 2000, there were 369 private households in the municipality, and an average of 2.5 persons per household. There were 56 households that consist of only one person and 19 households with five or more people. In 2000, a total of 207 apartments (85.2% of the total) were permanently occupied, while 12 apartments (4.9%) were seasonally occupied and 24 apartments (9.9%) were empty. As of 2009, the construction rate of new housing units was 7.5 new units per 1000 residents. The vacancy rate for the municipality, in 2010, was 0.39%.

The historical population is given in the following chart:

== Heritage sites of national significance ==
Rue Castle and the House de Maillardoz de Prez are listed as Swiss heritage site of national significance. The entire town of Rue and the village of Promasens are both part of the Inventory of Swiss Heritage Sites.

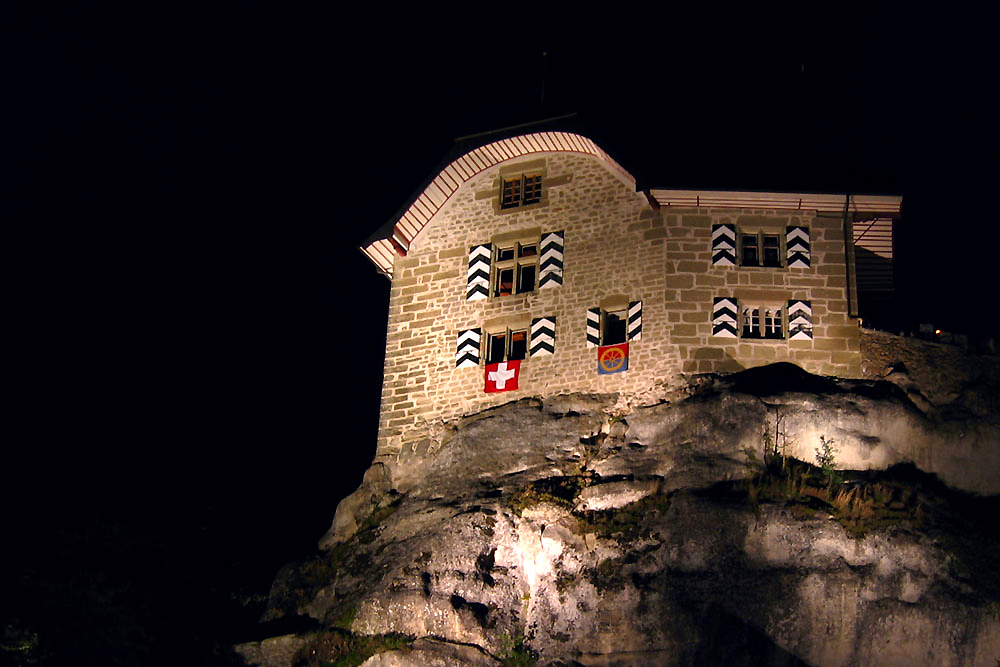
Rue Castle

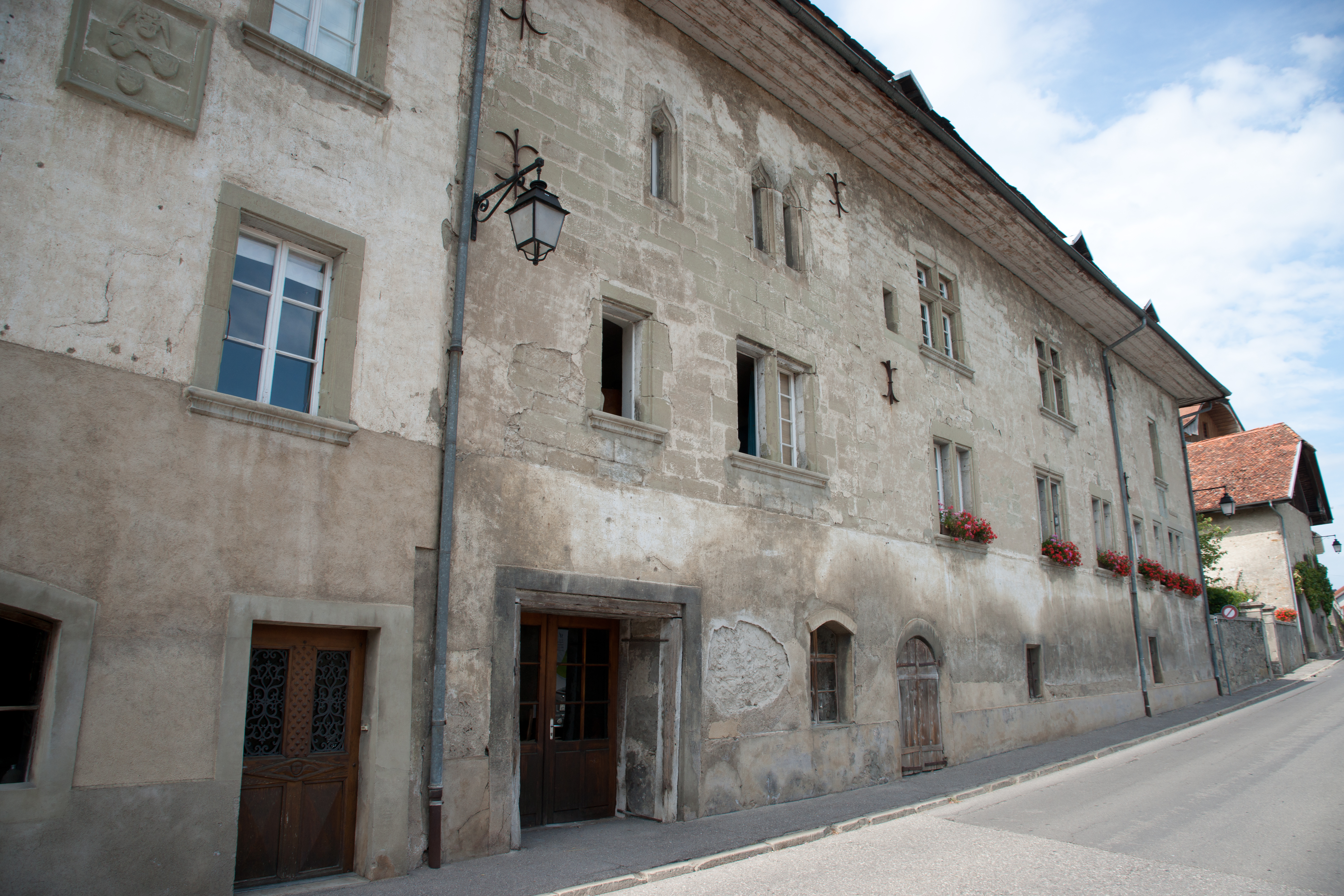
House de Maillardoz de Prez

== Politics ==
In the 2011 federal election the most popular party was the CVP which received 41.0% of the vote. The next three most popular parties were the SVP (21.6%), the SP (17.8%) and the FDP (6.2%).

The CVP improved their position in Rue rising to first, from second in 2007 (with 29.2%) The SVP moved from first in 2007 (with 31.5%) to second in 2011, the SPS retained about the same popularity (17.6% in 2007) and the FDP retained about the same popularity (9.4% in 2007). A total of 401 votes were cast in this election, of which 4 or 1.0% were invalid.

== Economy ==
As of 2010, Rue had an unemployment rate of 4%. As of 2008, there were 80 people employed in the primary economic sector and about 29 businesses involved in this sector. 55 people were employed in the secondary sector and there were 10 businesses in this sector. 100 people were employed in the tertiary sector, with 27 businesses in this sector. There were 264 residents of the municipality who were employed in some capacity, of which females made up 41.7% of the workforce.

In 2008 the total number of full-time equivalent jobs was 182. The number of jobs in the primary sector was 55, all of which were in agriculture. The number of jobs in the secondary sector was 52 of which 7 or (13.5%) were in manufacturing and 45 (86.5%) were in construction. The number of jobs in the tertiary sector was 75. In the tertiary sector; 24 or 32.0% were in wholesale or retail sales or the repair of motor vehicles, 17 or 22.7% were in the movement and storage of goods, 11 or 14.7% were in a hotel or restaurant, 1 was in the information industry, 5 or 6.7% were technical professionals or scientists, 8 or 10.7% were in education and 1 was in health care.

In 2000, there were 17 workers who commuted into the municipality and 180 workers who commuted away. The municipality is a net exporter of workers, with about 10.6 workers leaving the municipality for every one entering. Of the working population, 7.3% used public transportation to get to work, and 66.3% used a private car.

== Religion ==
From the 2000 census, 411 or 78.3% were Roman Catholic, while 58 or 11.0% belonged to the Swiss Reformed Church. Of the rest of the population, there was 1 member of an Orthodox church, and there were 12 individuals (or about 2.29% of the population) who belonged to another Christian church. There were 2 individuals who belonged to another church. 43 (or about 8.19% of the population) belonged to no church, are agnostic or atheist, and 4 individuals (or about 0.76% of the population) did not answer the question.

== Education ==
In Rue about 186 or (35.4%) of the population have completed non-mandatory upper secondary education, and 35 or (6.7%) have completed additional higher education (either university or a Fachhochschule). Of the 35 who completed tertiary schooling, 62.9% were Swiss men, 31.4% were Swiss women.

The Canton of Fribourg school system provides one year of non-obligatory Kindergarten, followed by six years of Primary school. This is followed by three years of obligatory lower Secondary school where the students are separated according to ability and aptitude. Following the lower Secondary students may attend a three or four year optional upper Secondary school. The upper Secondary school is divided into gymnasium (university preparatory) and vocational programs. After they finish the upper Secondary program, students may choose to attend a Tertiary school or continue their apprenticeship.

During the 2010–11 school year, there were a total of 116 students attending 6 classes in Rue. A total of 213 students from the municipality attended any school, either in the municipality or outside of it. There was one kindergarten class with a total of 22 students in the municipality. The municipality had 5 primary classes and 94 students. During the same year, there were no lower secondary classes in the municipality, but 55 students attended lower secondary school in a neighboring municipality. There were no upper Secondary classes or vocational classes, but there were 13 upper Secondary students and 24 upper Secondary vocational students who attended classes in another municipality. The municipality had no non-university Tertiary classes, but there was one non-university Tertiary student and 6 specialized Tertiary students who attended classes in another municipality.

As of 2000, there were 32 students in Rue who came from another municipality, while 47 residents attended schools outside the municipality.
