= Tours, Fribourg =

Fribourg enclave in Vaud, Switzerland

Tours
- Enclave
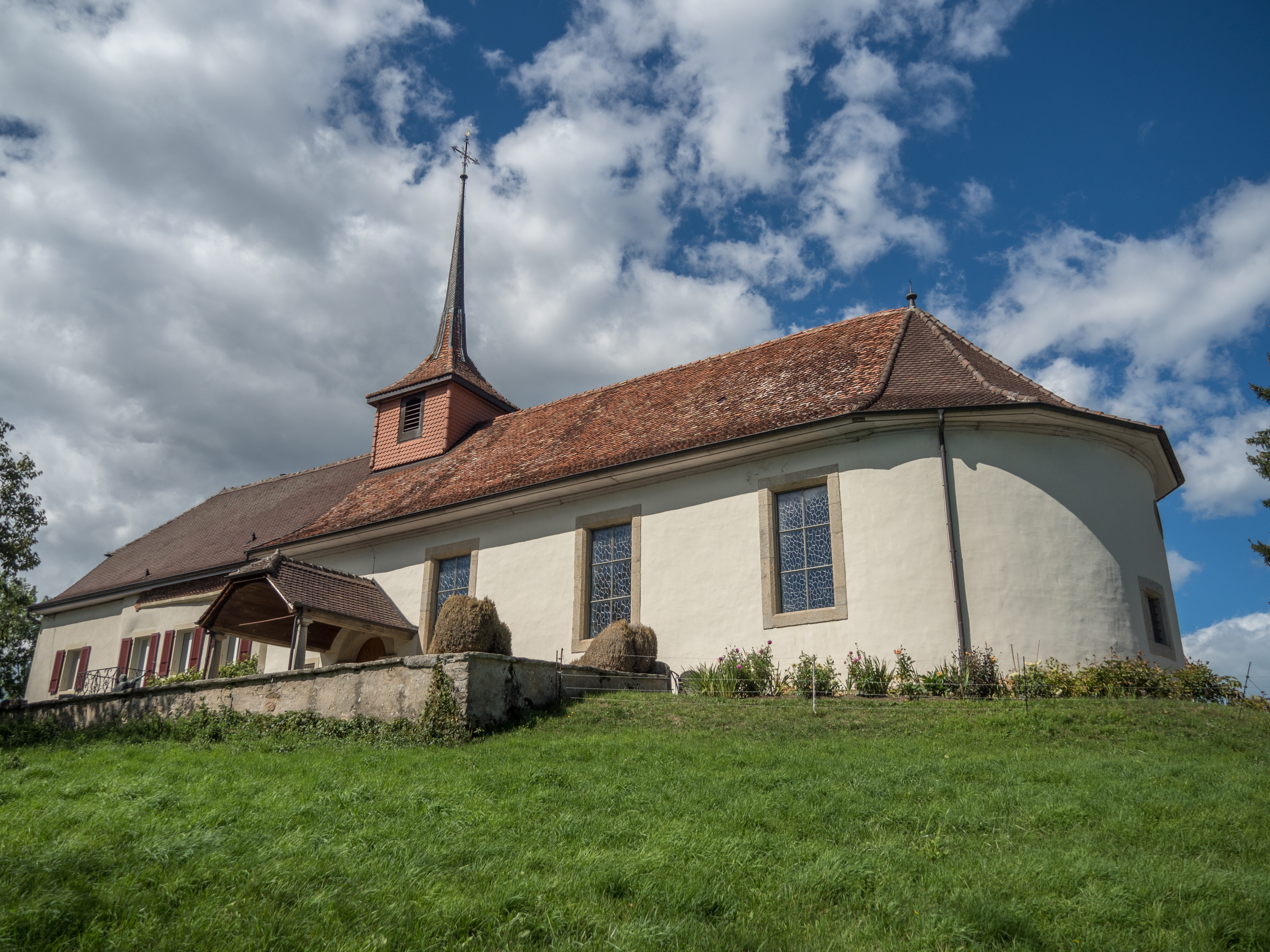
- Chapel of Notre-Dame de Tours

- Location within Switzerland Location within Canton of Fribourg
- Coordinates: 46.826763°N 6.97129°E
- Country: Switzerland
- Canton: Fribourg
- Municipality: Montagny

Tours is an enclave of the canton of Fribourg, Switzerland, within the municipality of Corcelles-près-Payerne in the canton of Vaud. It is part of the municipality of Montagny. From the 8th or 9th century it was the center of a parish, and Notre-Dame de Tours has been a place of pilgrimage since the 15th century. Tours belonged to the former municipality of Montagny-les-Monts, which merged with Montagny-la-Ville in 2000 to form Montagny.

== History ==
Tours is first mentioned in 1166 as De Turribus and in 1228 as Tors. From the 8th or 9th century it was the center of a parish that included the former municipalities of Montagny-les-Monts, Montagny-la-Ville and Mannens-Grandsivaz. In 1166 Bishop Landri de Durnes confirmed the donations made by his predecessor Amadeus to the priory of Saint-Maire in Lausanne, among them the church of Tours. In 1509 the town of Payerne ceded Tours to Fribourg in exchange for land at Corcelles.

A first church was built in the 6th century on the foundations of a Roman villa (excavations of 1974–1975). It was altered in the 9th or 10th century and rebuilt at the beginning of the 12th century. In the 17th century the parish church was moved to Montagny-les-Monts. The present chapel was built from 1778 to 1781. A place of pilgrimage since the 15th century, Notre-Dame de Tours has been a much-frequented center of spiritual life since a foundation was set up in 1954. From 1977 to 1988 it housed a Vietnamese Cistercian community.

== Bibliography ==
- O. Perler, "L'église de Notre-Dame de Tours", in Revue d'histoire ecclésiastique suisse, 69, 1975, 209–236
- W. Stöckli, "Les fouilles archéologiques à l'église Notre-Dame de Tours FR", in Revue suisse d'art et d'archéologie, 35, 1978, 79–100
- S. Jäggi, Die Herrschaft Montagny, 1989
