= Ponthaux =

- Former municipality
- Coat of arms
- Location of Ponthaux
- Location within Switzerland Location within Canton of Fribourg
- Coordinates: 46°49′N 7°2′E
- Country: Switzerland
- Canton: Fribourg
- District: Sarine

Government
  - Mayor: Pierre Bourgnon

Area
  - Total: 5.96 km^{2} (2.30 sq mi)
- Elevation: 650 m (2,130 ft)

Population (December 2020)
  - Total: 779
  - Density: 131/km^{2} (339/sq mi)
- Time zone: UTC+01:00 (CET)
  - Summer (DST): UTC+02:00 (CEST)
- Postal code: 1772
- SFOS number: 2217
- ISO 3166 code: CH-FR
- Surrounded by: Autafond, Chésopelloz, Grolley, Belmont-Broye, Montagny, Noréaz
- Website: SFSO statistics

Ponthaux (French: [pɔ̃to]; Arpitan: Pontèt [pɔ̃ˈtɑ]) is a former municipality in the district of Sarine in the canton of Fribourg in Switzerland. On 1 January 2025 the former municipalities of Grolley and Ponthaux merged to form the new municipality of Grolley-Ponthaux.

== History ==
Ponthaux is first mentioned in 1142 as Pontet.

== Geography ==
Ponthaux, as of 2009, has an area of 5.9 square kilometers (2.3 mi^{2}). Of this area, 4.19 km^{2} (1.62 mi^{2}) or 70.8% is used for agricultural purposes, while 1.37 km^{2} (0.53 mi^{2}) or 23.1% is forested. Of the rest of the land, 0.39 km^{2} (0.15 mi^{2}) or 6.6% is settled (buildings or roads) and 0.01 km^{2} (2.5 acres) or 0.2% is unproductive land.

Of the built up area, housing and buildings made up 4.6% and transportation infrastructure made up 1.5%. Out of the forested land, all of the forested land area is covered with heavy forests. Of the agricultural land, 49.0% is used for growing crops and 19.6% is pastures, while 2.2% is used for orchards or vine crops.

The municipality is located in the Sarine district. It consists of the village of Ponthaux and since the merger on 1 January 1981, the former municipality of Nierlet-les-Bois.

== Coat of arms ==
The blazon of the municipal coat of arms is Pally of Six Argent and Gules and in a Chief of the first a Cross bottony of the second between two Oak Leaves Vert.

== Demographics ==
Ponthaux has a population (as of December 2020) of 779. As of 2008, 7.3% of the population are resident foreign nationals. Over the last 10 years (2000–2010) the population has changed at a rate of 26.4%. Migration accounted for 15.6%, while births and deaths accounted for 7.9%.

Most of the population (as of 2000) speaks French (435 or 89.1%) as their first language, German is the second most common (43 or 8.8%) and Portuguese is the third (4 or 0.8%). There are 3 people who speak Italian.

As of 2008, the population was 49.8% male and 50.2% female. The population was made up of 273 Swiss men (44.7% of the population) and 31 (5.1%) non-Swiss men. There were 287 Swiss women (47.0%) and 20 (3.3%) non-Swiss women. Of the population in the municipality, 195 or about 40.0% were born in Ponthaux and lived there in 2000. There were 192 or 39.3% who were born in the same canton, while 69 or 14.1% were born somewhere else in Switzerland, and 32 or 6.6% were born outside of Switzerland.

As of 2000, children and teenagers (0–19 years old) make up 29.7% of the population, while adults (20–64 years old) make up 61.1% and seniors (over 64 years old) make up 9.2%.

As of 2000, there were 213 people who were single and never married in the municipality. There were 241 married individuals, 19 widows or widowers and 15 individuals who are divorced.

As of 2000, there were 172 private households in the municipality, and an average of 2.8 persons per household. There were 32 households that consist of only one person and 24 households with five or more people. In 2000, a total of 164 apartments (91.6% of the total) were permanently occupied, while 13 apartments (7.3%) were seasonally occupied and 2 apartments (1.1%) were empty. As of 2009, the construction rate of new housing units was 8 new units per 1000 residents. The vacancy rate for the municipality, in 2010, was 0.44%.

The historical population is given in the following chart:

== Politics ==
In the 2011 federal election the most popular party was the SPS which received 31.2% of the vote. The next three most popular parties were the CVP (20.5%), the SVP (18.1%) and the FDP (6.9%).

The SPS received about the same percentage of the vote as they did in the 2007 Federal election (27.8% in 2007 vs 31.2% in 2011). The CVP lost popularity (25.6% in 2007), the SVP retained about the same popularity (16.4% in 2007) and the FDP moved from below fourth place in 2007 to fourth. A total of 191 votes were cast in this election, of which 3 or 1.6% were invalid.

== Economy ==
As of 2010, Ponthaux had an unemployment rate of 2.5%. As of 2008, there were 39 people employed in the primary economic sector and about 16 businesses were involved in this sector. 14 people were employed in the secondary sector and there were 5 businesses in this sector. 45 people were employed in the tertiary sector, with 10 businesses in this sector. There were 259 residents of the municipality who were employed in some capacity, of which females made up 38.6% of the workforce.

In 2008 the total number of full-time equivalent jobs was 81. The number of jobs in the primary sector was 30, all of which were in agriculture. The number of jobs in the secondary sector was 13 of which 11 or (84.6%) were in manufacturing and 2 (15.4%) were in construction. The number of jobs in the tertiary sector was 38. In the tertiary sector; 16 or 42.1% were in wholesale or retail sales or the repair of motor vehicles, 5 or 13.2% were in a hotel or restaurant, 5 or 13.2% were in the information industry, 4 or 10.5% were technical professionals or scientists, 4 or 10.5% were in education and 1 was in health care.

In 2000, there were 31 workers who commuted into the municipality and 200 workers who commuted away. The municipality is a net exporter of workers, with about 6.5 workers leaving the municipality for every one entering. Of the working population, 6.9% used public transportation to get to work, and 67.6% used a private car.

== Religion ==
From the 2000 census, 413 or 84.6% were Roman Catholic, while 45 or 9.2% belonged to the Swiss Reformed Church. Of the rest of the population, there was 1 member of an Orthodox church, there was 1 individual who belonged to the Christian Catholic Church, and there were 13 individuals (or about 2.66% of the population) who belonged to another Christian church. There were 2 (or about 0.41% of the population) who were Islamic. 14 (or about 2.87% of the population) belonged to no church, are agnostic or atheist, and 4 individuals (or about 0.82% of the population) did not answer the question.

== Education ==
In Ponthaux about 176 or (36.1%) of the population have completed non-mandatory upper secondary education, and 44 or (9.0%) have completed additional higher education (either university or a Fachhochschule). Of the 44 who completed tertiary schooling, 72.7% were Swiss men, 20.5% were Swiss women.

The Canton of Fribourg school system provides one year of non-obligatory Kindergarten, followed by six years of Primary school. This is followed by three years of obligatory lower Secondary school where the students are separated according to ability and aptitude. Following the lower Secondary students may attend a three or four year optional upper Secondary school. The upper Secondary school is divided into gymnasium (university preparatory) and vocational programs. After they finish the upper Secondary program, students may choose to attend a Tertiary school or continue their apprenticeship.

During the 2010–11 school year, there were a total of 53 students attending 3 classes in Ponthaux. A total of 128 students from the municipality attended any school, either in the municipality or outside of it. There were no kindergarten classes in the municipality, but 10 students attended kindergarten in a neighboring municipality. The municipality had 3 primary classes and 53 students. During the same year, there were no lower secondary classes in the municipality, but 27 students attended lower secondary school in a neighboring municipality. There were no upper Secondary classes or vocational classes, but there were 9 upper Secondary students and 19 upper Secondary vocational students who attended classes in another municipality. The municipality had no non-university Tertiary classes, but there were 3 non-university Tertiary students and 3 specialized Tertiary students who attended classes in another municipality.

As of 2000, there were 23 students in Ponthaux who came from another municipality, while 43 residents attended schools outside the municipality.
