= Grolley =

- Former municipality
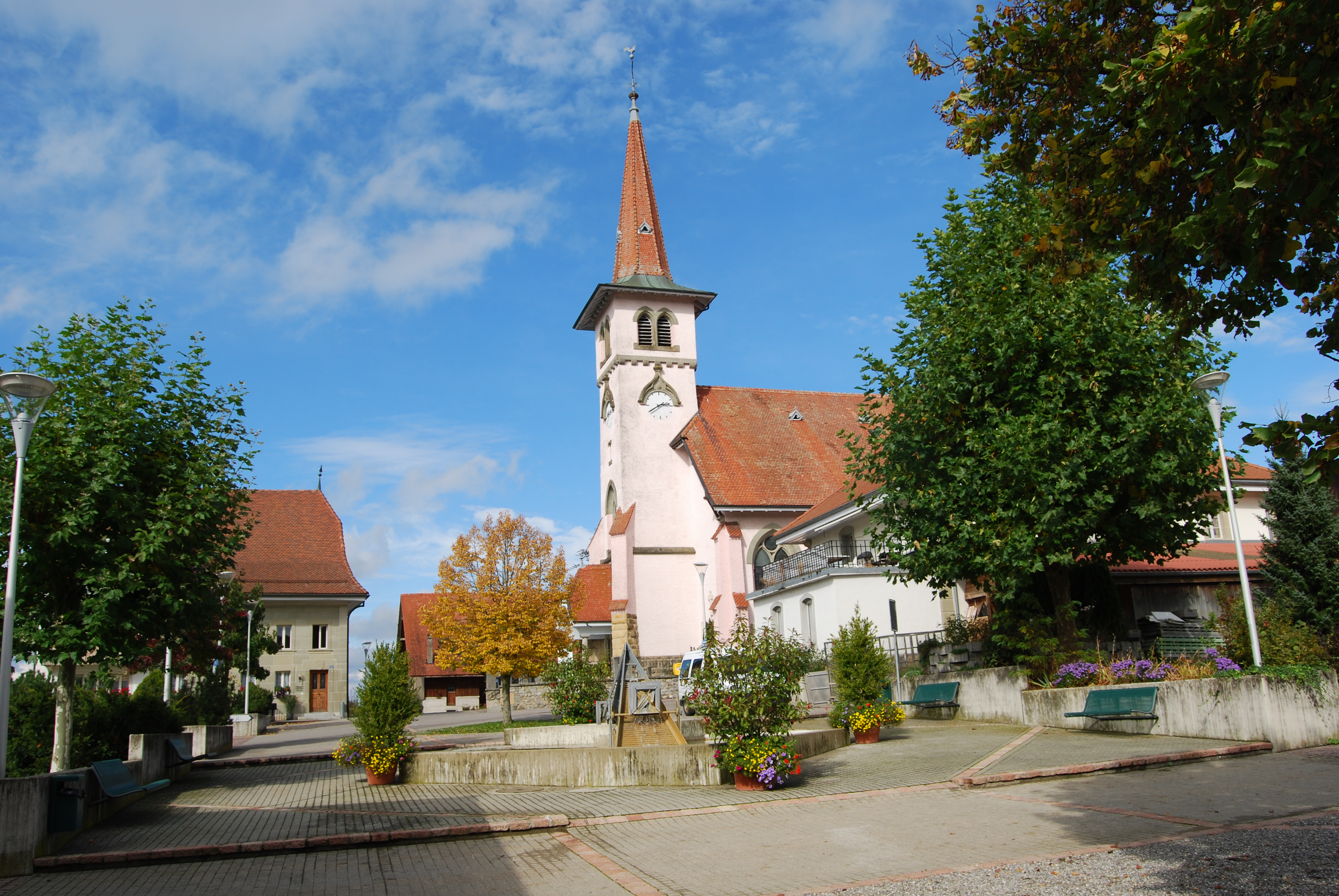

- Flag Coat of arms
- Location of Grolley
- Location within Switzerland Location within Canton of Fribourg
- Coordinates: 46°50′N 7°4′E
- Country: Switzerland
- Canton: Fribourg
- District: Sarine

Government
  - Mayor: Syndic

Area
  - Total: 5.32 km^{2} (2.05 sq mi)
- Elevation: 625 m (2,051 ft)

Population (December 2020)
  - Total: 2,084
  - Density: 392/km^{2} (1,010/sq mi)
- Time zone: UTC+01:00 (CET)
  - Summer (DST): UTC+02:00 (CEST)
- Postal code: 1772
- SFOS number: 2200
- ISO 3166 code: CH-FR
- Surrounded by: Autafond, Belfaux, Léchelles, Misery-Courtion, Ponthaux
- Website: grolley.ch

Grolley (French: [ɡʁɔlɛ]; Arpitan: Grolê) is a former municipality in the district of Sarine in the canton of Fribourg in Switzerland. On 1 January 2025 the former municipalities of Grolley and Ponthaux merged to form the new municipality of Grolley-Ponthaux.

== History ==
Grolley is first mentioned around 1137-38 as de Groslerio.

== Geography ==
Grolley has an area, as of 2009, of 5.3 square kilometers (2.0 mi^{2}). Of this area, 3.46 km^{2} (1.34 mi^{2}) or 64.8% is used for agricultural purposes, while 0.98 km^{2} (0.38 mi^{2}) or 18.4% is forested. Of the rest of the land, 0.88 km^{2} (0.34 mi^{2}) or 16.5% is settled (buildings or roads).

Of the built up area, industrial buildings made up 3.0% of the total area while housing and buildings made up 8.2% and transportation infrastructure made up 3.6%. Power and water infrastructure as well as other special developed areas made up 1.1% of the area Out of the forested land, 17.2% of the total land area is heavily forested and 1.1% is covered with orchards or small clusters of trees. Of the agricultural land, 41.4% is used for growing crops and 23.0% is pastures.

The municipality is located in the Sarine district, on the Fribourg-Payerne road. Since 2000 consists of the villages of Grolley and Corsalettes. On 1 January 2000 the former municipality of Corsalettes merged into the municipality of Grolley.

== Coat of arms ==
The blazon of the municipal coat of arms is Argent chief Or a Bendlet of the first on a Bend Sable fimbriated Gules frette with a Bendlet sinister Vert on a Bend Sinister of the second fimbriated of the last. The new coat of arms was adopted after the 2000 merger of Corsaletters into Grolley.

== Demographics ==
Grolley has a population (as of December 2020) of 2,084. As of 2008, 10.8% of the population are resident foreign nationals. Over the last 10 years (2000–2010) the population has changed at a rate of 9.5%. Migration accounted for 14.2%, while births and deaths accounted for 4.9%.

Most of the population (as of 2000) speaks French (1,326 or 90.0%) as their first language, German is the second most common (91 or 6.2%) and Italian is the third (17 or 1.2%).

As of 2008, the population was 50.7% male and 49.3% female. The population was made up of 730 Swiss men (44.5% of the population) and 101 (6.2%) non-Swiss men. There were 724 Swiss women (44.1%) and 85 (5.2%) non-Swiss women. Of the population in the municipality, 437 or about 29.7% were born in Grolley and lived there in 2000. There were 645 or 43.8% who were born in the same canton, while 222 or 15.1% were born somewhere else in Switzerland, and 159 or 10.8% were born outside of Switzerland.

As of 2000, children and teenagers (0–19 years old) make up 29.1% of the population, while adults (20–64 years old) make up 62.3% and seniors (over 64 years old) make up 8.6%.

As of 2000, there were 681 people who were single and never married in the municipality. There were 686 married individuals, 56 widows or widowers and 50 individuals who are divorced.

As of 2000, there were 535 private households in the municipality, and an average of 2.7 persons per household. There were 118 households that consist of only one person and 64 households with five or more people. In 2000, a total of 526 apartments (93.6% of the total) were permanently occupied, while 28 apartments (5.0%) were seasonally occupied and 8 apartments (1.4%) were empty. As of 2009, the construction rate of new housing units was 14.6 new units per 1000 residents. The vacancy rate for the municipality, in 2010, was 2.25%.

The historical population is given in the following chart:

== Politics ==
In the 2011 federal election the most popular party was the SPS which received 31.2% of the vote. The next three most popular parties were the CVP (23.8%), the SVP (19.4%) and the FDP (10.2%).

The SPS received about the same percentage of the vote as they did in the 2007 Federal election (33.1% in 2007 vs 31.2% in 2011). The CVP lost popularity (29.3% in 2007), the SVP retained about the same popularity (16.4% in 2007) and the FDP retained about the same popularity (9.8% in 2007). A total of 530 votes were cast in this election, of which 9 or 1.7% were invalid.

== Economy ==
As of 2010, Grolley had an unemployment rate of 2.5%. As of 2008, there were 39 people employed in the primary economic sector and about 13 businesses involved in this sector. 84 people were employed in the secondary sector and there were 16 businesses in this sector. 488 people were employed in the tertiary sector, with 38 businesses in this sector. There were 761 residents of the municipality who were employed in some capacity, of which females made up 40.3% of the workforce.

In 2008 the total number of full-time equivalent jobs was 549. The number of jobs in the primary sector was 25, all of which were in agriculture. The number of jobs in the secondary sector was 79 of which 33 or (41.8%) were in manufacturing and 46 (58.2%) were in construction. The number of jobs in the tertiary sector was 445. In the tertiary sector; 70 or 15.7% were in wholesale or retail sales or the repair of motor vehicles, 14 or 3.1% were in the movement and storage of goods, 16 or 3.6% were in a hotel or restaurant, 8 or 1.8% were technical professionals or scientists, 17 or 3.8% were in education and 2 or 0.4% were in health care.

In 2000, there were 203 workers who commuted into the municipality and 574 workers who commuted away. The municipality is a net exporter of workers, with about 2.8 workers leaving the municipality for every one entering. Of the working population, 13.7% used public transportation to get to work, and 67.1% used a private car.

== Religion ==
From the 2000 census, 1,228 or 83.4% were Roman Catholic, while 104 or 7.1% belonged to the Swiss Reformed Church. Of the rest of the population, there were 4 members of an Orthodox church (or about 0.27% of the population), and there were 12 individuals (or about 0.81% of the population) who belonged to another Christian church. There were 19 (or about 1.29% of the population) who were Islamic. 80 (or about 5.43% of the population) belonged to no church, are agnostic or atheist, and 32 individuals (or about 2.17% of the population) did not answer the question.

== Education ==
In Grolley about 536 or (36.4%) of the population have completed non-mandatory upper secondary education, and 189 or (12.8%) have completed additional higher education (either university or a Fachhochschule). Of the 189 who completed tertiary schooling, 70.9% were Swiss men, 21.7% were Swiss women, 4.8% were non-Swiss men and 2.6% were non-Swiss women.

The Canton of Fribourg school system provides one year of non-obligatory Kindergarten, followed by six years of Primary school. This is followed by three years of obligatory lower Secondary school where the students are separated according to ability and aptitude. Following the lower Secondary students may attend a three or four year optional upper Secondary school. The upper Secondary school is divided into gymnasium (university preparatory) and vocational programs. After they finish the upper Secondary program, students may choose to attend a Tertiary school or continue their apprenticeship.

During the 2010–11 school year, there were a total of 202 students attending 12 classes in Grolley. A total of 352 students from the municipality attended any school, either in the municipality or outside of it. There were 2 kindergarten classes with a total of 34 students in the municipality. The municipality had 7 primary classes and 138 students. During the same year, there were no lower secondary classes in the municipality, but 72 students attended lower secondary school in a neighboring municipality. There were 3 upper Secondary classes, with 30 upper Secondary students. The municipality had no non-university Tertiary classes, but there were 4 non-university Tertiary students and 2 specialized Tertiary students who attended classes in another municipality.

As of 2000, there were 16 students in Grolley who came from another municipality, while 127 residents attended schools outside the municipality.

== Transportation ==
The municipality has a railway station, Grolley. It is located on the Fribourg–Yverdon line and has regular service to Fribourg/Freiburg and Yverdon-les-Bains.
