= Cugy FR railway station =

Railway station in Cugy, Switzerland

Cugy FR
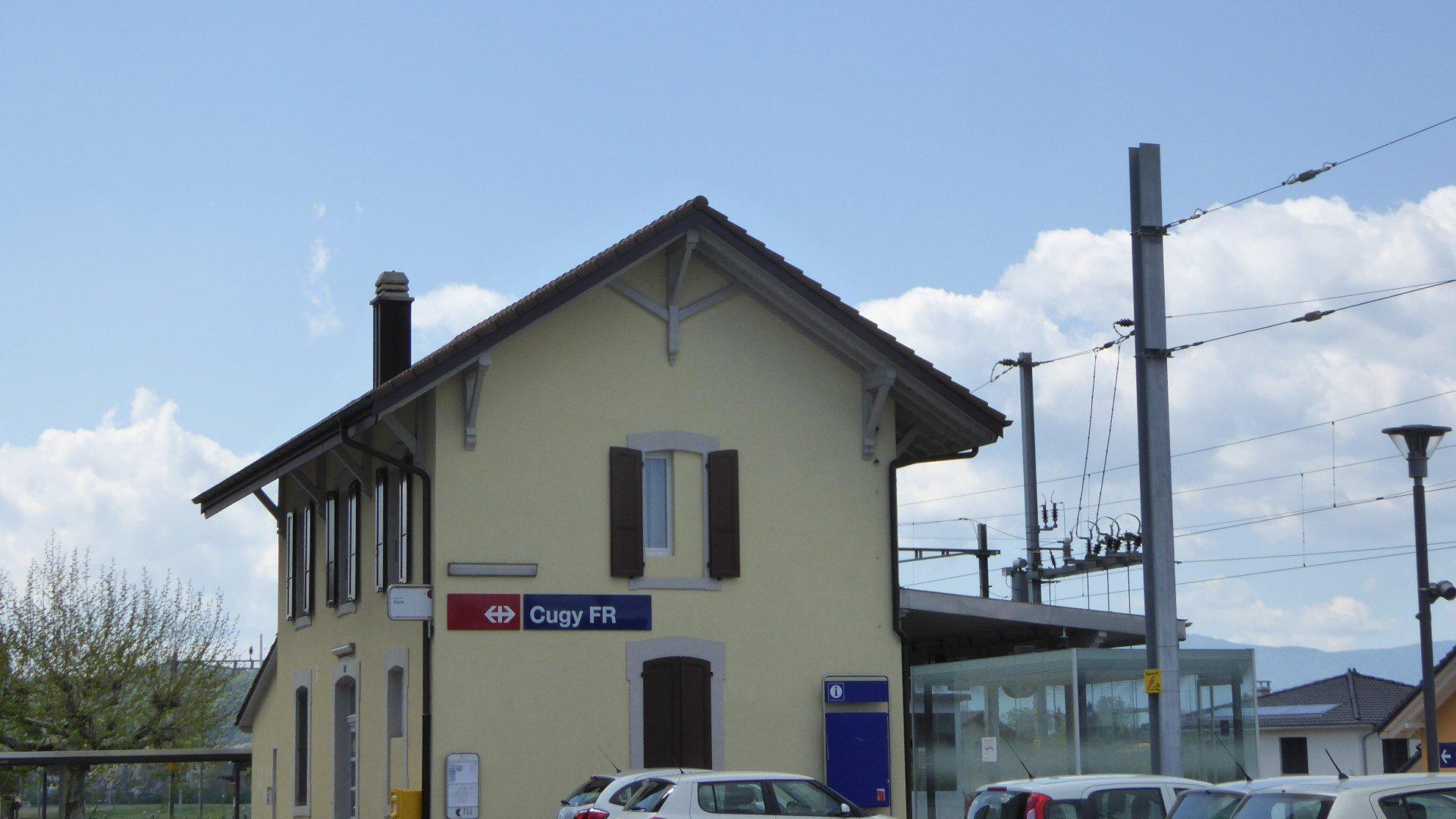
- The station building in 2018

General information
- Location: Cugy; Switzerland
- Coordinates: 46°48′58″N 6°53′21″E
- Elevation: 468 m (1,535 ft)
- Owner: Swiss Federal Railways
- Line: Fribourg–Yverdon line
- Distance: 23.7 km (14.7 mi) from Yverdon-les-Bains
- Platforms: 1 (1 side platform)
- Tracks: 2
- Train operators: Swiss Federal Railways
- Connections: tpf buses; CarPostal SA bus line

Construction
- Parking: Yes (5 spaces)
- Cycle facilities: Yes (20 spaces)
- Accessible: Yes

Other information
- Station code: 8504133 (CGY)
- Fare zone: 80, 81, and 85 (frimobil); 100, 106, and 107 (mobilis)

Passengers
- 2023: 740 per weekday (SBB)

Services
Preceding station	RER Fribourg	Following station
Estavayer-le-Lac towards Yverdon-les-Bains	S30	Payerne towards Fribourg/Freiburg
Estavayer-le-Lac towards Yverdon-les-Bains	S30	Payerne towards Fribourg/Freiburg
Location

Cugy FR railway station (French: Gare de Cugy FR) is a railway station in the municipality of Cugy, in the Swiss canton of Fribourg. It is an intermediate stop on the standard gauge Fribourg–Yverdon line of Swiss Federal Railways.

== Services ==
As of the December 2024 timetable change, the following services stop at Cugy FR:

- RER Fribourg S30 S30: half-hourly service between Yverdon-les-Bains and Fribourg/Freiburg.
