= Cheyres railway station =

Railway station in Cheyres, Switzerland

Cheyres
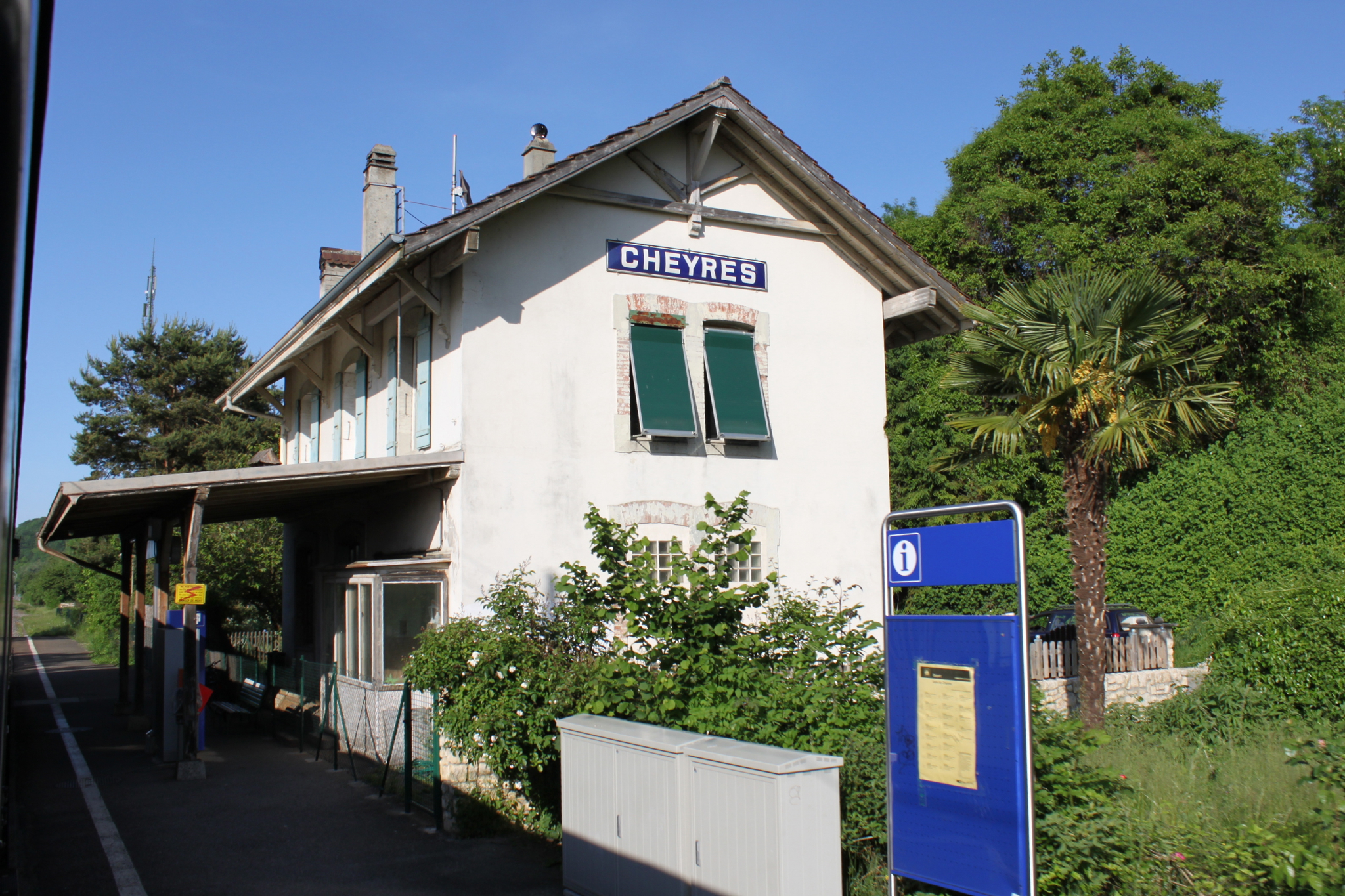
- The station building in 2009

General information
- Location: Cheyres; Switzerland
- Coordinates: 46°49′01″N 6°47′11″E
- Elevation: 435 m (1,427 ft)
- Owner: Swiss Federal Railways
- Line: Fribourg–Yverdon line
- Distance: 12.6 km (7.8 mi) from Yverdon-les-Bains
- Platforms: 2 (2 side platforms)
- Tracks: 2
- Train operators: Swiss Federal Railways
- Connections: tpf bus line

Construction
- Parking: Yes (3 spaces)
- Cycle facilities: Yes (13 spaces)
- Accessible: Yes

Other information
- Station code: 8504131 (CHS)
- Fare zone: 85 (frimobil); 107 (mobilis)

Passengers
- 2023: 510 per weekday (SBB)

Services
Preceding station	RER Fribourg	Following station
Yvonand towards Yverdon-les-Bains	S30	Estavayer-le-Lac towards Fribourg/Freiburg
Yvonand towards Yverdon-les-Bains	S30	Estavayer-le-Lac towards Fribourg/Freiburg
Location

Cheyres railway station (French: Gare de Cheyres) is a railway station in the municipality of Cheyres, in the Swiss canton of Fribourg. It is an intermediate stop on the standard gauge Fribourg–Yverdon line of Swiss Federal Railways.

== Services ==
As of the December 2024 timetable change, the following services stop at Cheyres:

- RER Fribourg S30 S30: half-hourly service between Yverdon-les-Bains and Fribourg/Freiburg.
