= Cousset railway station =

Railway station in Montagny, Switzerland

Cousset
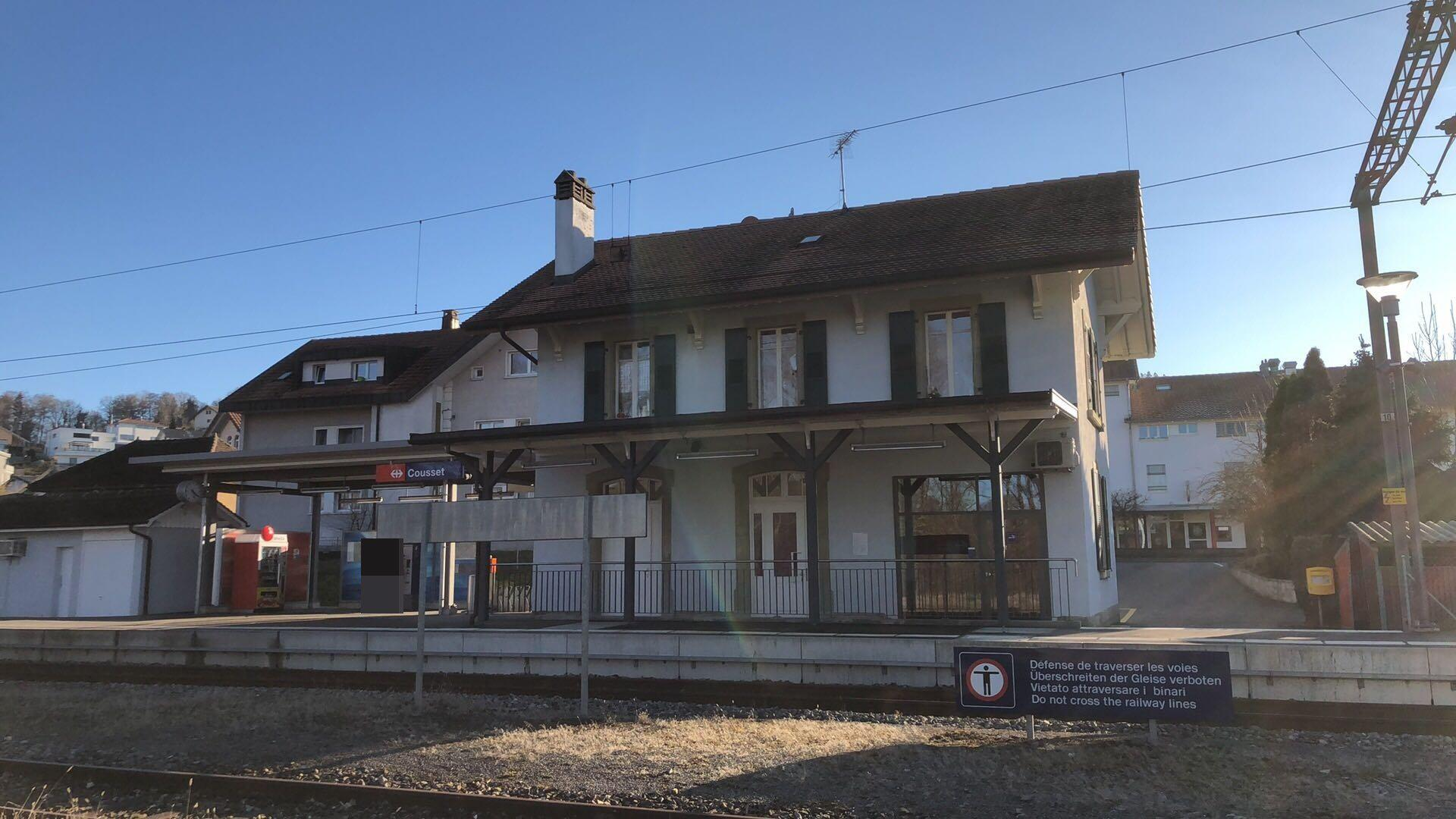
- The station building in 2019

General information
- Location: Montagny; Switzerland
- Coordinates: 46°49′07″N 6°58′39″E
- Elevation: 484 m (1,588 ft)
- Owner: Swiss Federal Railways
- Line: Fribourg–Yverdon line
- Distance: 31.8 km (19.8 mi) from Yverdon-les-Bains
- Platforms: 1 (1 side platform)
- Tracks: 2
- Train operators: Swiss Federal Railways
- Connections: CarPostal SA bus line; tpf night bus line

Construction
- Parking: Yes (12 spaces)
- Cycle facilities: Yes (24 spaces)
- Accessible: Yes

Other information
- Station code: 8504136 (COUS)
- Fare zone: 82 (frimobil)

Passengers
- 2023: 430 per weekday (SBB)

Services
| Preceding station | RER Fribourg | Following station |
|---|---|---|
| Corcelles-Sud towards Yverdon-les-Bains | S30 | Léchelles towards Fribourg/Freiburg |
| Corcelles-Sud towards Yverdon-les-Bains | S30 | Léchelles towards Fribourg/Freiburg |
Location

Cousset railway station (French: Gare de Cousset) is a railway station in the municipality of Montagny, in the Swiss canton of Fribourg. It is an intermediate stop on the standard gauge Fribourg–Yverdon line of Swiss Federal Railways.

== Services ==
As of the December 2024 timetable change, the following services stop at Cousset:

- RER Fribourg S30 S30: half-hourly service between Yverdon-les-Bains and Fribourg/Freiburg.
