= Misery, Fribourg =

Former municipality, canton of Fribourg

Misery
- Former municipality
- Location of Misery
- Location within Switzerland Location within Canton of Fribourg
- Coordinates: 46.8526001°N 7.06720018°E
- Country: Switzerland
- Canton: Fribourg
- District: See
- Municipality: Misery-Courtion

Population (1990)
  - Total: 379
- Time zone: UTC+01:00 (CET)
  - Summer (DST): UTC+02:00 (CEST)
- SFOS number: 2272
- ISO 3166 code: CH-FR
- Website

Misery (former German name Miserach) is a former municipality in the See district of the canton of Fribourg, Switzerland, on the road from Fribourg to Avenches. Since 1997 it has been part of the municipality of Misery-Courtion.

== History ==
Misery is first mentioned in 1176 as Misirie. Roman remains and early medieval graves have been found there.

Misery was part of the lordship of Montagny and then of Fribourg's Old Territories (Anciennes Terres), in the Hospital banner (bannière de l'Hôpital). From 1798 it belonged to the district of Avenches and from 1803 to 1848 to the district of Fribourg. Aymon de Montagny sold the village to Petrus Rich of Fribourg in 1243/1244, and part of it passed in 1287 to the Hospitaller commandery of Saint-Jean in Fribourg. In 1460 Petermann de Faucigny acquired the fortified house (maison forte) of Misery and its estates from Antoine Saliceto, and in 1489 the property and rights of the commandery.

The manor house, of medieval origin, was remodeled at the beginning of the 18th century and has wall paintings from 1470–1480. The chapel was built before 1482 and rebuilt shortly before 1713. Misery has always belonged to the parish of Courtion.

Livestock farming and diversified crop farming are practiced. An inn is mentioned from 1554. A 19th-century public oven was demolished in 1987. Before the merger, Misery belonged to the school district (cercle scolaire) of Courtion.

Misery had 148 inhabitants in 1811, 174 in 1850, 259 in 1900, 220 in 1950 and 379 in 1990.

== Bibliography ==
- S. Jäggi, Die Herrschaft Montagny, 1989
- Les monuments d'art et d'histoire du canton de Fribourg, vol. 4, 1989, pp. 242–255

This article incorporates text from a free content work. Licensed under CC-BY SA. Text taken from Misery, Marianne Rolle, Historical Dictionary of Switzerland.
