= Yvonand railway station =

Railway station in Yvonand, Switzerland

Yvonand
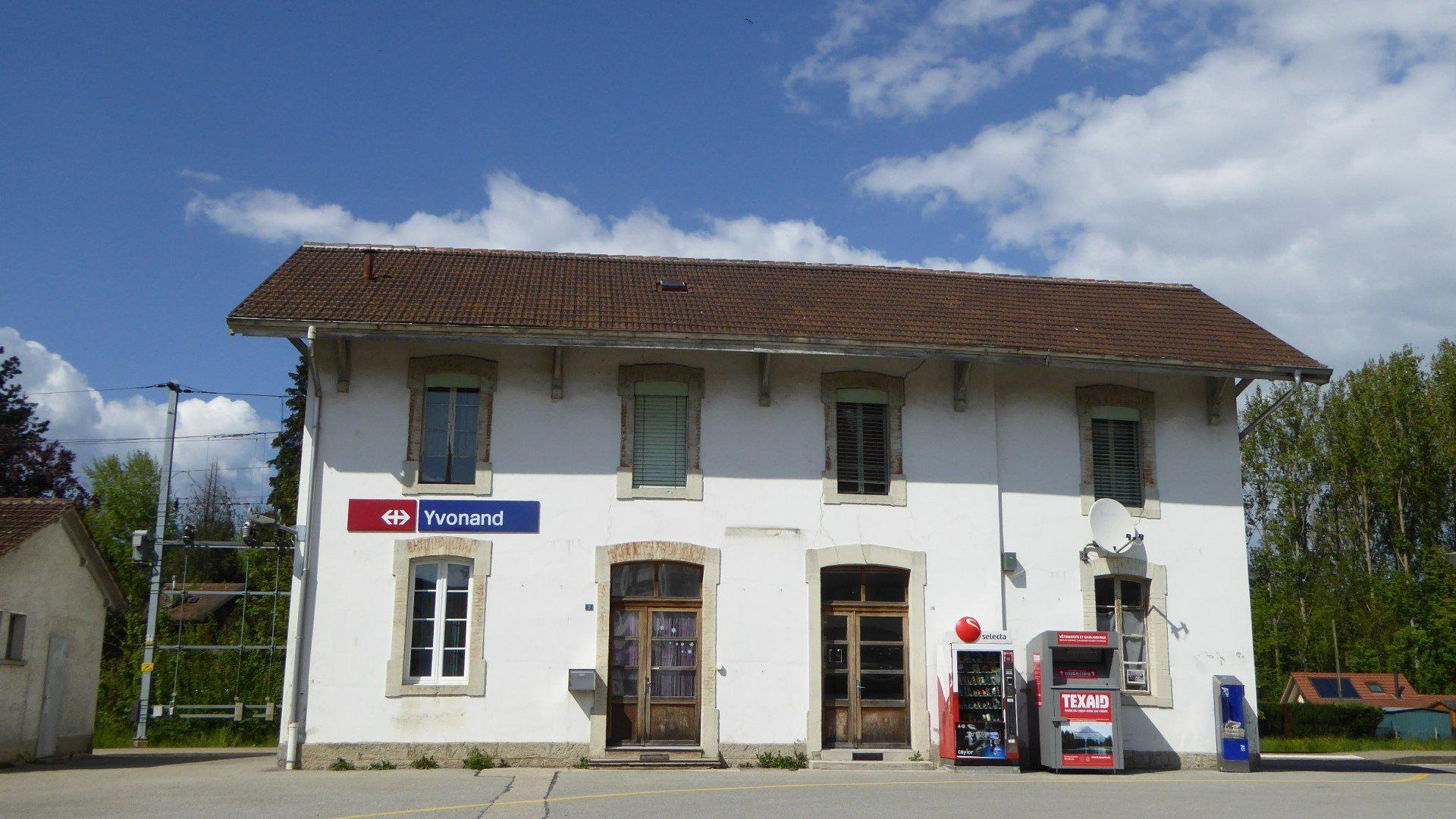
- The station building in 2018

General information
- Location: Yvonand; Switzerland
- Coordinates: 46°48′03″N 6°44′48″E
- Elevation: 433 m (1,421 ft)
- Owner: Swiss Federal Railways
- Line: Fribourg–Yverdon line
- Distance: 8.8 km (5.5 mi) from Yverdon-les-Bains
- Platforms: 1 (1 side platform)
- Tracks: 2
- Train operators: Swiss Federal Railways
- Connections: CarPostal SA buses

Construction
- Parking: Yes (44 spaces)
- Cycle facilities: Yes (100 spaces)
- Accessible: Yes

Other information
- Station code: 8504130 (YND)
- Fare zone: 108 (mobilis)

Passengers
- 2023: 980 per weekday (SBB)

Services
Preceding station	RER Fribourg	Following station
Yverdon-les-Bains Terminus	S30	Cheyres towards Fribourg/Freiburg
Yverdon-les-Bains Terminus	S30	Cheyres towards Fribourg/Freiburg
Location

Yvonand railway station (French: Gare d'Yvonand) is a railway station in the municipality of Yvonand, in the Swiss canton of Vaud. It is an intermediate stop on the standard gauge Fribourg–Yverdon line of Swiss Federal Railways.

== Services ==
As of the December 2024 timetable change, the following services stop at Yvonand:

- RER Fribourg S30 S30: half-hourly service between Yverdon-les-Bains and Fribourg/Freiburg.
