= Estavayer-le-Lac railway station =

Railway station in Estavayer, Switzerland

Estavayer-le-Lac
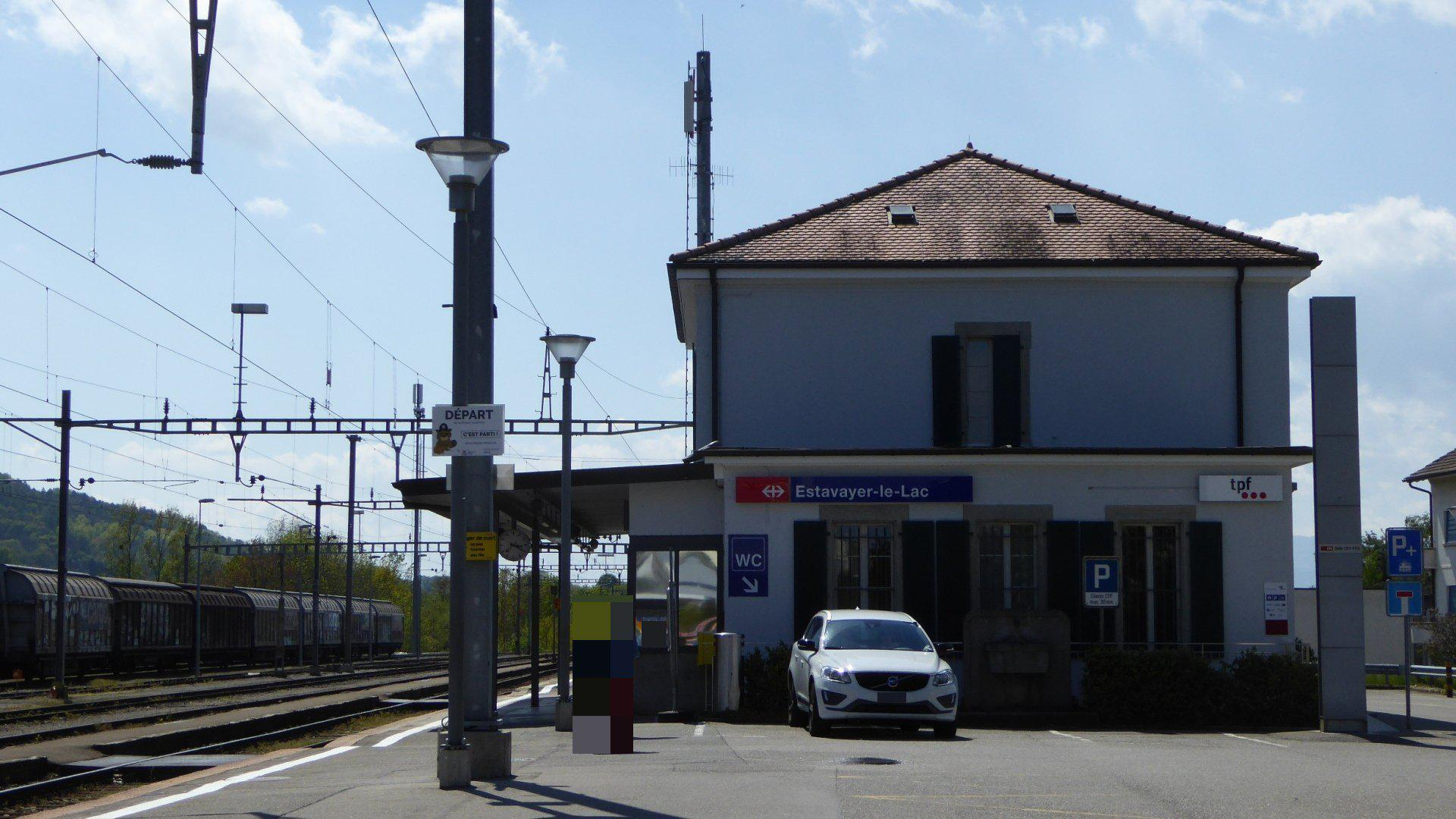
- The station building in 2018

General information
- Location: Estavayer-le-Lac; Switzerland
- Coordinates: 46°50′40″N 6°50′35″E
- Elevation: 462 m (1,516 ft)
- Owner: Swiss Federal Railways
- Line: Fribourg–Yverdon line
- Distance: 18.1 km (11.2 mi) from Yverdon-les-Bains
- Platforms: 2
- Tracks: 2
- Train operators: Swiss Federal Railways
- Connections: tpf buses; CarPostal SA bus line

Construction
- Parking: Yes (34 spaces)
- Cycle facilities: Yes (42 spaces)
- Accessible: No

Other information
- Station code: 8504132 (EST)
- Fare zone: 80 (frimobil); 106 (mobilis)

Passengers
- 2023: 1'700 per weekday (SBB)

Services
Preceding station	RER Fribourg	Following station
Cheyres towards Yverdon-les-Bains	S30	Cugy FR towards Fribourg/Freiburg
Cheyres towards Yverdon-les-Bains	S30	Cugy FR towards Fribourg/Freiburg
Location

Estavayer-le-Lac railway station (French: Gare d'Estavayer-le-Lac) is a railway station in the city of Estavayer-le-Lac, within the municipality of Estavayer, in the Swiss canton of Fribourg. It is an intermediate stop on the standard gauge Fribourg–Yverdon line of Swiss Federal Railways.

== Services ==
As of the December 2024 timetable change, the following services stop at Estavayer-le-Lac:

- RER Fribourg S30 S30: half-hourly service between Yverdon-les-Bains and Fribourg/Freiburg.
