= Courtion =

Former municipality, canton of Fribourg

- Former municipality
- Coat of arms
- Location of Courtion
- Location within Switzerland Location within Canton of Fribourg
- Coordinates: 46.8583°N 7.0707°E
- Country: Switzerland
- Canton: Fribourg
- District: See
- Municipality: Misery-Courtion

Population (1990)
  - Total: 255
- Time zone: UTC+01:00 (CET)
  - Summer (DST): UTC+02:00 (CEST)
- SFOS number: 2255
- ISO 3166 code: CH-FR
- Website

Courtion is a former municipality in the See district of the canton of Fribourg, Switzerland. Since 1997 it has been part of the municipality of Misery-Courtion. It is a street village east of the Chandon, not far from the road from Fribourg to Avenches.

== History ==
Courtion is first mentioned between 1001 and 1031 as Curtis Teudonis and around 1160 as Cortiun. A family of the same name is mentioned from the 12th to the 14th century. From the 13th century, burghers of Fribourg and the great hospital (grand hôpital) of Fribourg acquired property and rights there. In 1425–1426 the lords of Avenches owned a fortified house (maison forte) at Courtion. In 1493 the Faucigny family appropriated a large part of the tithe.

Courtion was part of Fribourg's Old Territories (Anciennes Terres), in the Hospital banner (bannière de l'Hôpital), until 1798. It then belonged to the district of Avenches, and from 1803 to 1848 to the district of Fribourg.

The parish of Courtion is mentioned in 1228, and a parish priest around 1152. It includes Cournillens, Cormérod, Corsalettes and Misery. The advowson (droit de collation) belonged to the lords of Avenches and then to the Faucigny family, and in 1504 it passed to the cantorate (chantrerie) of Saint-Nicolas in Fribourg. The church, dedicated to Saint Marcellus, was given by King Rudolph III of Burgundy to the Abbey of Saint-Maurice between 1001 and 1031; it was rebuilt in 1730–1731.

Livestock farming and fodder crops are practiced, and there is a timber industry. In 1960 the first oil well on Fribourg territory was drilled at Courtion, without result.

Courtion had 123 inhabitants in 1811, 209 in 1850, 215 in 1900, 254 in 1950, 214 in 1980 and 255 in 1990.

== Bibliography ==
- A. Dellion, Dictionnaire historique et statistique des paroisses catholiques du canton de Fribourg, vols. 3–4, pp. 365–405
- L. Dupraz, "Courtion aux Xe–XIe siècle", in Annales fribourgeoises, 21, 1933, pp. 102–115
- Les monuments d'art et d'histoire du canton de Fribourg, vol. 4, 1989, pp. 142–162
