= Léchelles railway station =

Railway station in Belmont-Broye, Switzerland

Léchelles
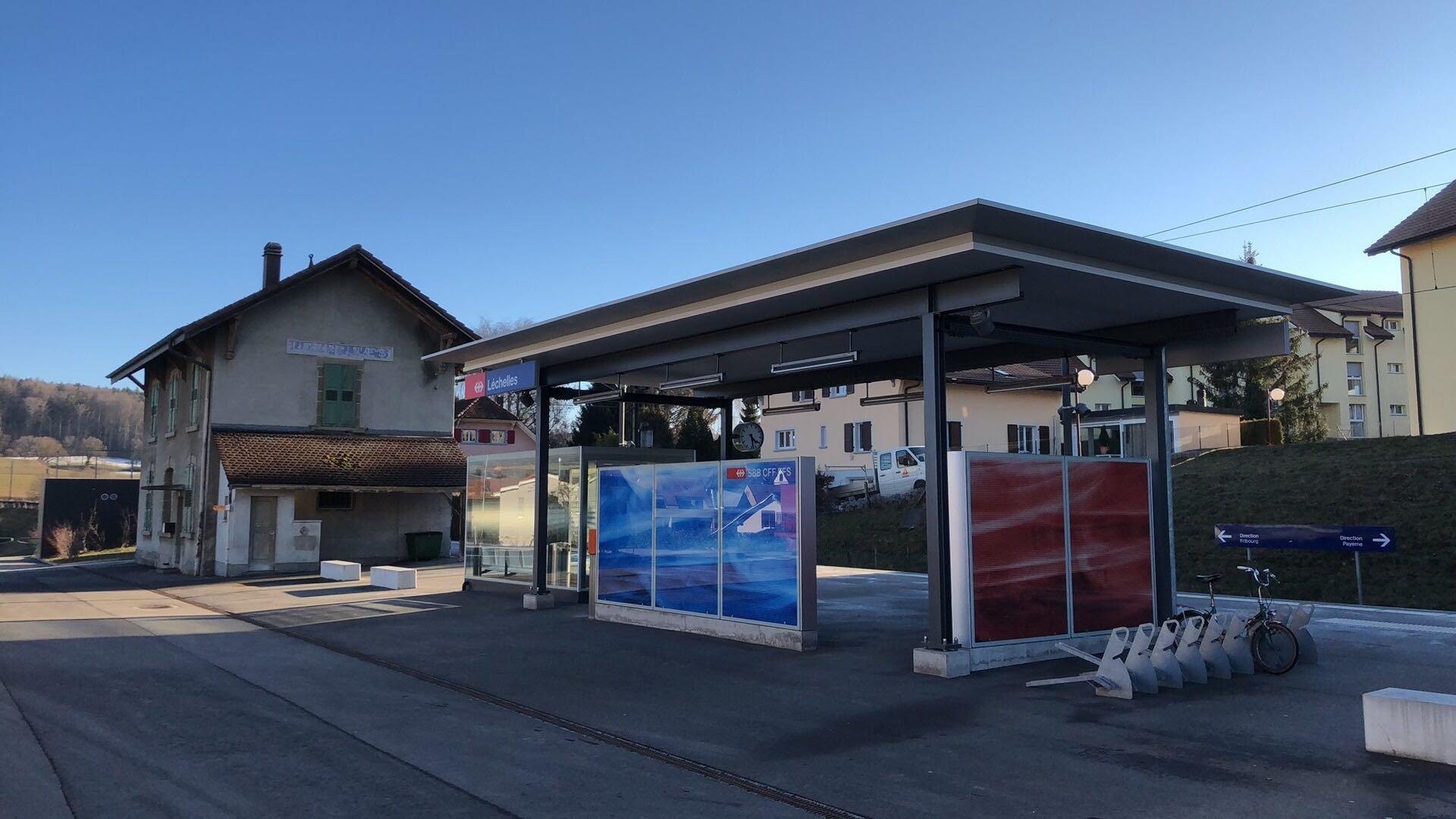
- The station building in 2019

General information
- Location: Belmont-Broye; Switzerland
- Coordinates: 46°49′42″N 7°00′42″E
- Elevation: 551 m (1,808 ft)
- Owner: Swiss Federal Railways
- Line: Fribourg–Yverdon line
- Distance: 35.5 km (22.1 mi) from Yverdon-les-Bains
- Platforms: 1 (1 side platform)
- Tracks: 1
- Train operators: Swiss Federal Railways
- Connections: Transports publics Fribourgeois buses

Construction
- Cycle facilities: Yes (14 spaces)
- Accessible: Yes

Other information
- Station code: 8504137 (LECH)
- Fare zone: 82 and 83 (frimobil))

Passengers
- 2023: 360 per weekday (SBB)

Services
Preceding station	RER Fribourg	Following station
Cousset towards Yverdon-les-Bains	S30	Grolley towards Fribourg/Freiburg
Cousset towards Yverdon-les-Bains	S30	Grolley towards Fribourg/Freiburg
Location

Léchelles railway station (French: Gare de Léchelles) is a railway station in the municipality of Belmont-Broye, in the Swiss canton of Fribourg. It is an intermediate stop on the standard gauge Fribourg–Yverdon line of Swiss Federal Railways.

== Services ==
As of the December 2024 timetable change, the following services stop at Léchelles:

- RER Fribourg S30 S30: half-hourly service between Yverdon-les-Bains and Fribourg/Freiburg.
