= Grolley railway station =

Railway station in Grolley, Switzerland

Grolley
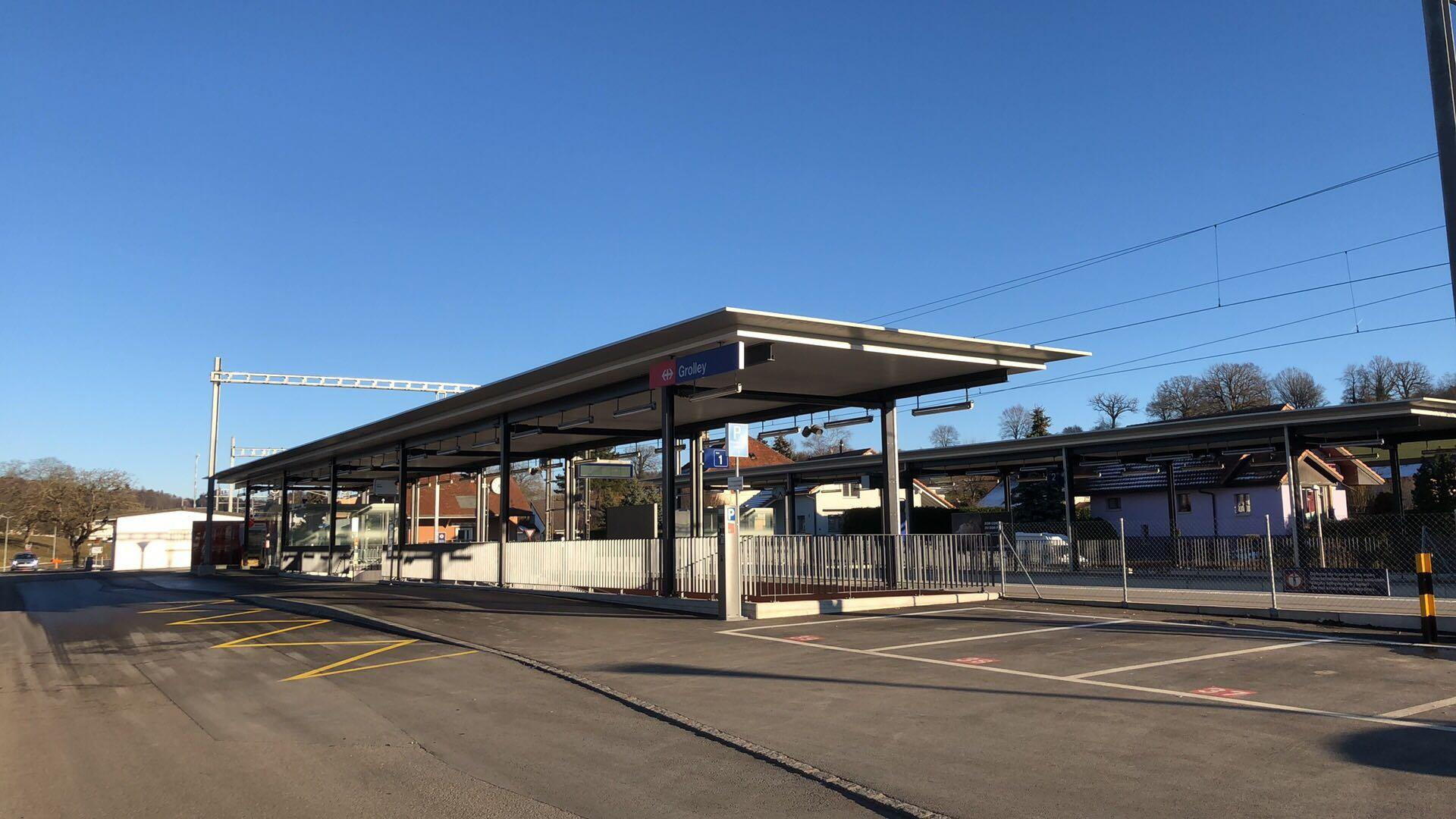
- The station platforms in 2019

General information
- Location: Grolley; Switzerland
- Coordinates: 46°49′55″N 7°03′58″E
- Elevation: 612 m (2,008 ft)
- Owner: Swiss Federal Railways
- Line: Fribourg–Yverdon line
- Distance: 40.1 km (24.9 mi) from Yverdon-les-Bains
- Platforms: 2 (2 side platforms)
- Tracks: 2
- Train operators: Swiss Federal Railways
- Connections: Transports publics Fribourgeois buses

Construction
- Parking: Yes (39 spaces)
- Cycle facilities: Yes (56 spaces)
- Accessible: Yes

Other information
- Station code: 8504138 (GRO)
- Fare zone: 11 and 83 (frimobil)

Passengers
- 2023: 910 per weekday (SBB)

Services
Preceding station	RER Fribourg	Following station
Léchelles towards Yverdon-les-Bains	S30	Belfaux CFF towards Fribourg/Freiburg
Léchelles towards Yverdon-les-Bains	S30	Belfaux CFF towards Fribourg/Freiburg
Location

Grolley railway station (French: Gare de Grolley) is a railway station in the former municipality of Grolley (part of Grolley-Ponthaux since 2025), in the Swiss canton of Fribourg. It is an intermediate stop on the standard gauge Fribourg–Yverdon line of Swiss Federal Railways.

== Services ==
As of the December 2024 timetable change, the following services stop at Grolley:

- RER Fribourg S30 S30: half-hourly service between Yverdon-les-Bains and Fribourg/Freiburg.
