= Corcelles-Sud railway station =

Railway station in Corcelles-près-Payerne, Switzerland

Corcelles-Sud
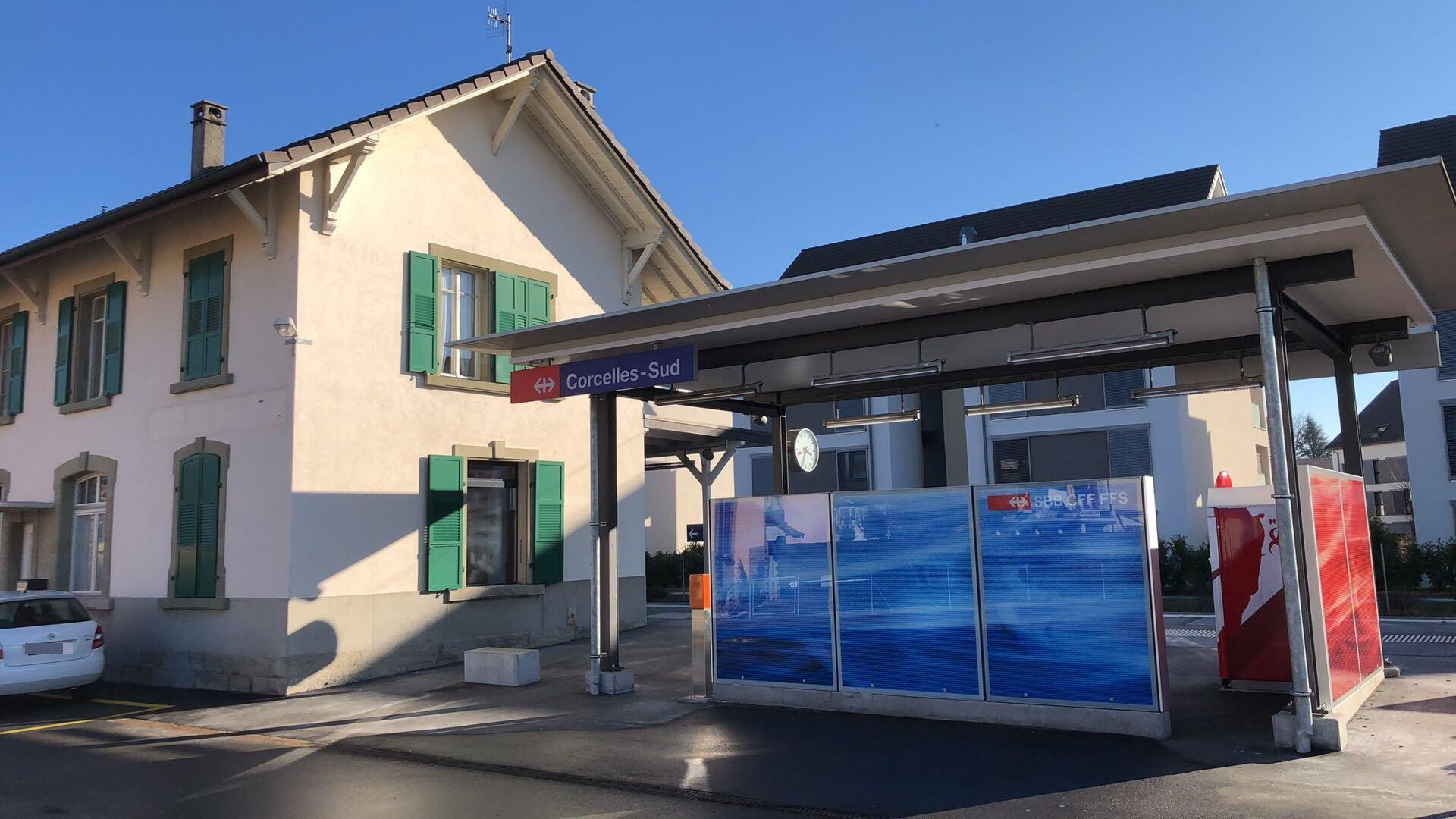
- The station building in 2019

General information
- Location: Corcelles-près-Payerne; Switzerland
- Coordinates: 46°49′44″N 6°57′26″E
- Elevation: 451 m (1,480 ft)
- Owner: Swiss Federal Railways
- Line: Fribourg–Yverdon line
- Distance: 29.7 km (18.5 mi) from Yverdon-les-Bains
- Platforms: 1 (1 side platform)
- Tracks: 1
- Train operators: Swiss Federal Railways
- Connections: tpf night bus line

Construction
- Parking: Yes (6 spaces)
- Cycle facilities: Yes (29 spaces)
- Accessible: Yes

Other information
- Station code: 8504135 (CS)
- Fare zone: 81 (frimobil); 100 (mobilis)

Passengers
- 2023: 590 per weekday (SBB)

Services
Preceding station	RER Fribourg	Following station
Payerne towards Yverdon-les-Bains	S30	Cousset towards Fribourg/Freiburg
Payerne towards Yverdon-les-Bains	S30	Cousset towards Fribourg/Freiburg
Location

Corcelles-Sud railway station (French: Gare de Corcelles-Sud) is a railway station in the municipality of Corcelles-près-Payerne, in the Swiss canton of Vaud. It is an intermediate stop on the standard gauge Fribourg–Yverdon line of Swiss Federal Railways. The station is 1 kilometre (0.62 mi) south of Corcelles-Nord on the Palézieux–Lyss line.

== Services ==
As of the December 2024 timetable change, the following services stop at Corcelles-Sud:

- RER Fribourg S30 S30: half-hourly service between Yverdon-les-Bains and Fribourg/Freiburg.
