= Cournillens =

Former municipality, canton of Fribourg

- Former municipality
- Coat of arms
- Location of Cournillens
- Location within Switzerland Location within Canton of Fribourg
- Coordinates: 46.850004°N 7.100008°E
- Country: Switzerland
- Canton: Fribourg
- District: See
- Municipality: Misery-Courtion

Population (1990)
  - Total: 264
- Time zone: UTC+01:00 (CET)
  - Summer (DST): UTC+02:00 (CEST)
- SFOS number: 2252
- ISO 3166 code: CH-FR
- Website

Cournillens (former German name Kurlin) is a former municipality in the See district of the canton of Fribourg, Switzerland. Since 1997 it has been part of the municipality of Misery-Courtion. It is a French-speaking dispersed settlement on the language border.

== History ==
Cournillens is first mentioned between 1000 and 1031 as Corlingino and in 1228 as Curlinin. In 1228 Rudolf of Neuchâtel granted to four burghers of Fribourg the tithe of Cournillens, which gradually came into Fribourg's possession. Numerous endowments and acquisitions there were held by Hauterive Abbey and the burghers' hospital (hôpital des Bourgeois) of Fribourg. During the Laupen War of 1339, Cournillens was burned down by the Bernese. A castle is mentioned in 1393.

Cournillens was part of Fribourg's Old Territories (Anciennes Terres), in the Hospital banner (bannière de l'Hôpital), until 1798, then of the district of Avenches until 1803 and of the district of Fribourg until 1848. Communal regulations date from 1495, and a gouverneur (village head) is mentioned from 1645. From 1848 to 1988 Cournillens was the seat of the justice of the peace of the first circle (cercle) of the See district.

Cournillens belonged to the parish of Courtion, as attested from the middle of the 15th century. The chapel of Saint-Léger is probably the sanctuary that Rudolph III of Burgundy gave to the Abbey of Saint-Maurice between 1000 and 1031. It was restored and given a hermitage in 1466, and it is a place of pilgrimage.

The marshes were drained in 1862. Livestock farming and the growing of fodder crops and cereals are practiced.

Cournillens had 234 inhabitants in 1811, 251 in 1850, 321 in 1900, 328 in 1930, 309 in 1950 and 264 in 1990.

== Bibliography ==
- Les monuments d'art et d'histoire du canton de Fribourg, vol. 4, 1989, pp. 113–132
