= Cormérod =

Former municipality, canton of Fribourg

- Former municipality
- Coat of arms
- Location of Cormérod
- Location within Switzerland Location within Canton of Fribourg
- Coordinates: 46.866667°N 7.083338°E
- Country: Switzerland
- Canton: Fribourg
- District: See
- Municipality: Misery-Courtion

Population (1990)
  - Total: 154
- Time zone: UTC+01:00 (CET)
  - Summer (DST): UTC+02:00 (CEST)
- SFOS number: 2248
- ISO 3166 code: CH-FR
- Website

Cormérod (former German name Kormerat) is a former municipality in the See district of the canton of Fribourg, Switzerland. Since 1997 it has been part of the municipality of Misery-Courtion.

== History ==
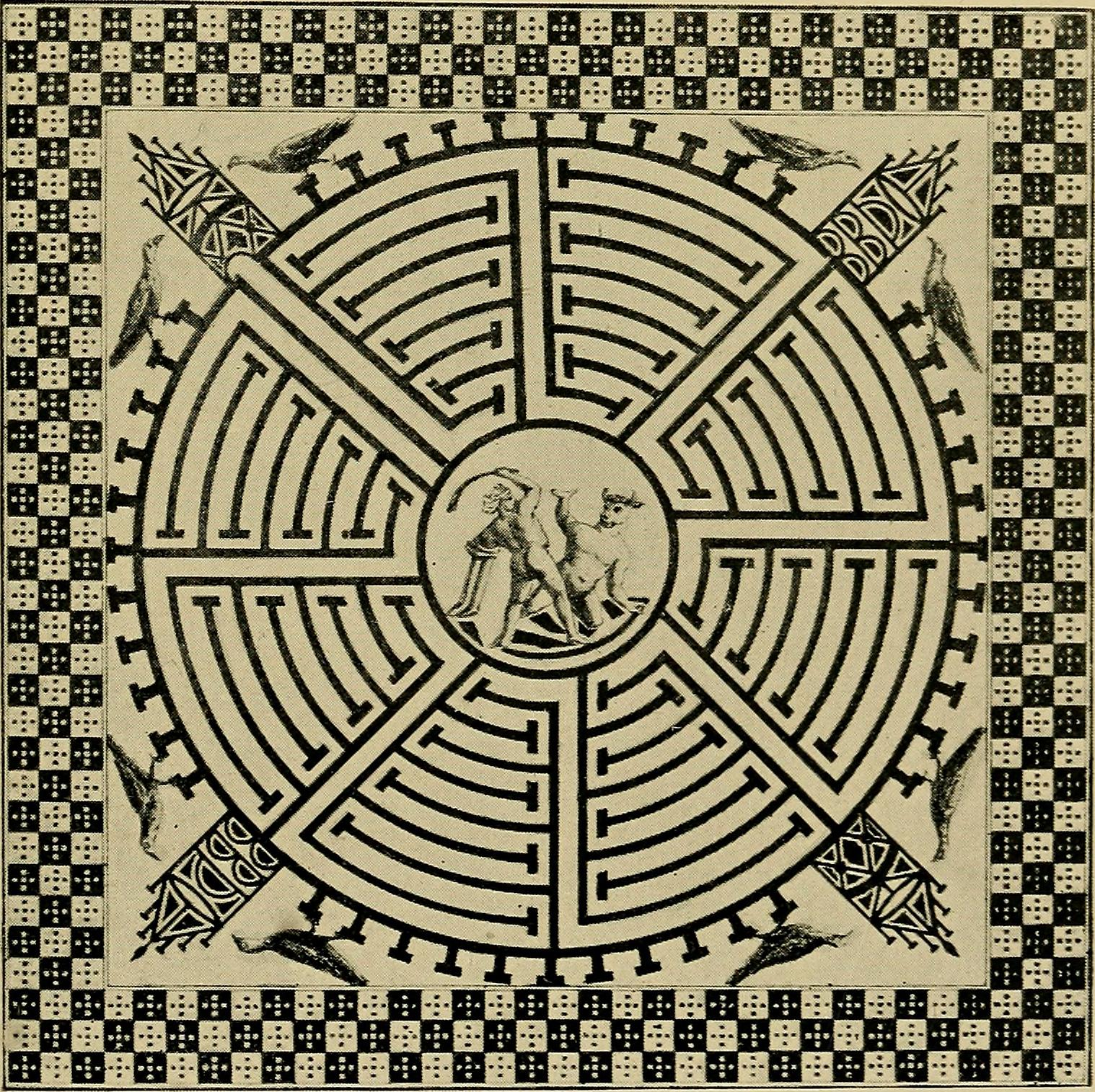
Drawing of the Cormérod mosaic in W. H. Matthews's Mazes and Labyrinths (1922)

Cormérod is first mentioned in 1142 as Cormoral. An important Roman villa stood there; its mosaic from the first half of the 3rd century shows Theseus fighting the Minotaur in the labyrinth.

In 1228 Rudolf of Neuchâtel granted the tithe of Cormérod as a fief to four burghers of Fribourg. The lords of Englisberg gave property there to Hauterive Abbey in 1250–1251 and 1258, and Anselme d'Illens gave other property to the hospital of Fribourg in 1274. These acquisitions prepared the way for Cormérod's incorporation into Fribourg's Old Territories (Anciennes Terres), to which it belonged, in the Hospital banner (bannière de l'Hôpital), from the 15th century until 1798. It was then part of the district of Avenches until 1803 and of the district of Fribourg until 1848.

Cormérod has belonged to the parish of Courtion since at least the middle of the 15th century. The chapel of Saint Anthony the Hermit was built in the middle of the 17th century, and the school building dates from 1873. Cattle farming and fodder crops are practiced; a cheese dairy society (société de fromagerie) dates from 1830.

Cormérod had 118 inhabitants in 1811, 173 in 1850, 235 in 1900, 188 in 1920, 218 in 1930, 168 in 1950 and 154 in 1990.

== Bibliography ==
- Les monuments d'art et d'histoire du canton de Fribourg, vol. 4, 1989, pp. 86–90
