= Mannens-Grandsivaz =

Former municipality, canton of Fribourg

- Former municipality
- Coat of arms
- Location of Mannens-Grandsivaz
- Location within Switzerland Location within Canton of Fribourg
- Coordinates: 46.800002°N 6.966669°E
- Country: Switzerland
- Canton: Fribourg
- District: Broye
- Municipality: Montagny

Population (2000)
  - Total: 472
- Time zone: UTC+01:00 (CET)
  - Summer (DST): UTC+02:00 (CEST)
- ISO 3166 code: CH-FR
- Website

Mannens-Grandsivaz is a former municipality in the Broye district of the canton of Fribourg, Switzerland, on the cantonal road from Fribourg to Payerne. Since 2004 it has been part of the municipality of Montagny, together with Montagny-la-Ville and Montagny-les-Monts. It was formed in 1831 by joining the two former municipalities of Mannens and Grandsivaz, and was called Mannens until 1953.

== History ==
Mannens-Grandsivaz is first mentioned in 1184 as Magnens. Other name forms are the Latin grandis silva (great forest) and the former German name Grossenwald. Archaeological finds include three graves from the Early Bronze Age and a Hallstatt tumulus.

Payerne Priory owned property in Grandsivaz in 1183. Mannens-Grandsivaz was part of the lordship of Montagny, which Fribourg acquired in 1478. It belonged to the bailiwick of Montagny (1478–1798), then to the districts of Payerne (1798–1803), Montagny (1803–1830), Dompierre (1831–1848) and Broye (from 1848). In church matters, it came under the parish of Tours-Montagny until it was made a parish of its own in 1874. The church of the Sacred Heart was built in 1875–1879 on the site of the former chapel of Saint Anthony, which had been consecrated in 1697, enlarged in the 18th century and demolished in 1875.

Businesses include a transport company, a mechanical workshop, a joinery and a cabinetmaker's workshop. Agriculture consists of cereal growing and livestock farming (17 farms in 2000). Mannens-Grandsivaz had 252 inhabitants in 1811, 319 in 1850, 398 in 1900, 407 in 1950 and 472 in 2000. In 2004 it became part of the municipality of Montagny.

== Bibliography ==
- S. Jäggi, Die Herrschaft Montagny, 1989

=== Archives ===
- Card index, State Archives of Fribourg (Archives de l'Etat de Fribourg)
