= Grolley-Ponthaux =

- Municipality
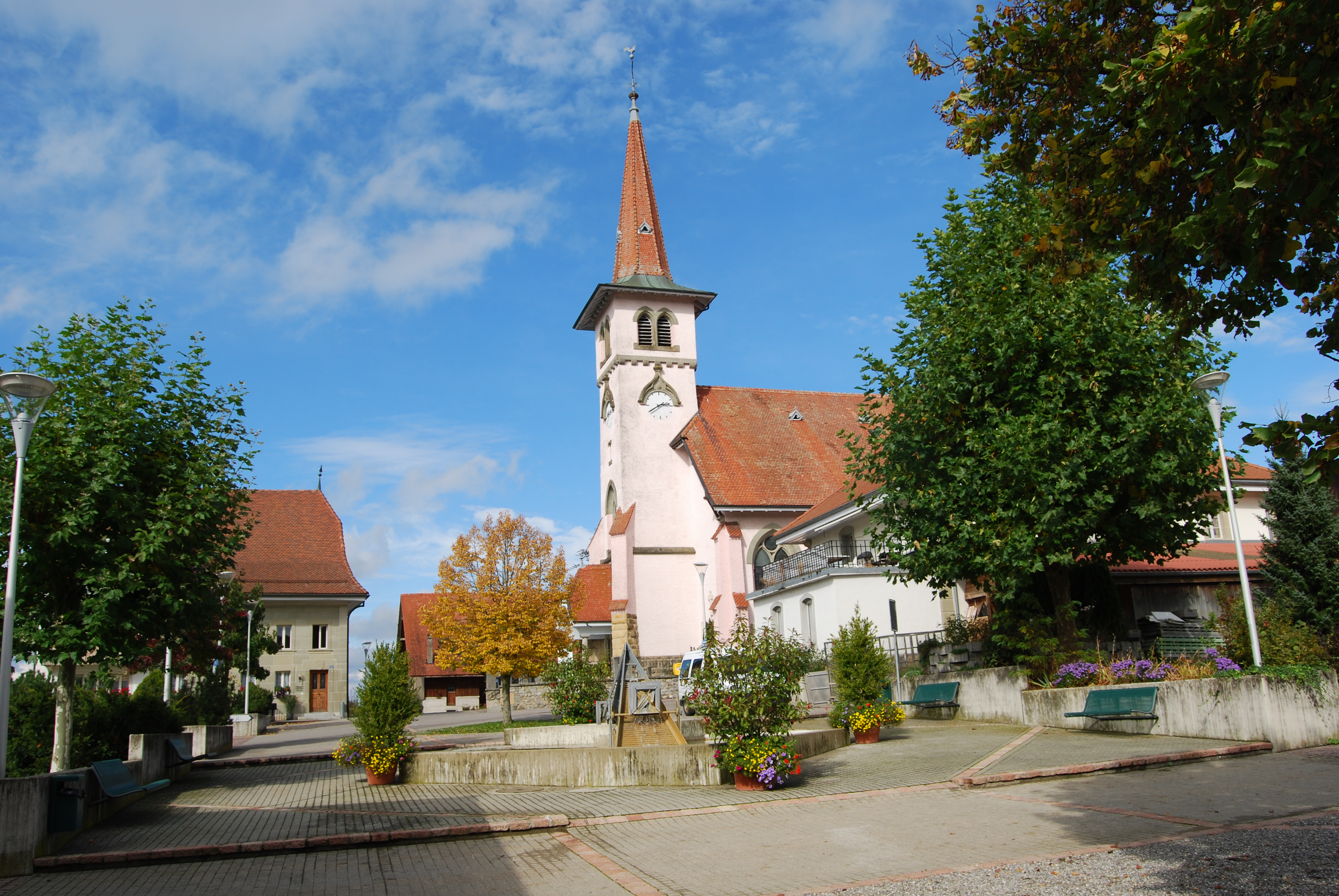
- Catholic church of Grolley

- Flag Coat of arms
- Location of Grolley-Ponthaux
- Location within Switzerland Location within Canton of Fribourg
- Coordinates: 46°50′N 7°04′E
- Country: Switzerland
- Canton: Fribourg
- District: Sarine

Government
  - Executive: Conseil communal with 9 members
  - Mayor: Syndic; Christophe Prétet (as of 2025)
  - Parliament: Conseil général with 42 members

Area
  - Total: 11.25 km^{2} (4.34 sq mi)

Population (2025-12-31)
  - Total: 2,881
  - Density: 256.1/km^{2} (663.3/sq mi)
- Time zone: UTC+01:00 (CET)
  - Summer (DST): UTC+02:00 (CEST)
- Postal code: 1772
- SFOS number: 2239
- ISO 3166 code: CH-FR
- Localities: Corsalettes, Grolley, Nierlet-les-Bois, Ponthaux
- Surrounded by: Belfaux, Belmont-Broye, Corminboeuf, Misery-Courtion, Montagny, Prez
- Website: www.grolley-ponthaux.ch

Grolley-Ponthaux (French: [ɡʁɔlɛ pɔ̃to]) is a municipality in the district of Sarine in the canton of Fribourg in Switzerland. It was formed on 1 January 2025 by the merger of Grolley and Ponthaux. It had an official population of 2881 as of 31 December 2022.

== Geography ==
Grolley-Ponthaux is located between Fribourg in the east and Payerne in the west, on the divide between the Broye and Sarine watersheds. It borders the municipalities of Belfaux, Belmont-Broye, Corminboeuf, Misery-Courtion, Montagny, and Prez. It has an area of 11.25 square kilometres (4.34 sq mi).

== History ==
Grolley became part of Fribourg's Anciennes Terres in 1442, while Ponthaux has been in Fribourg's possession since 1478, except when it was briefly attached to the canton of Léman from 1798 to 1803.

A vehicle park for the Swiss Army and a wastewater treatment plant were built in Grolley in 1970, and a new primary school in 1972.

The municipality of Nierlet-des-Bois merged with Ponthaux in 1981, and Corsalettes merged with Grolley in 2000.

A proposal to merge Grolley and Ponthaux narrowly failed in 2015, but a second referendum on merging the two municipalities succeeded in 2024. The merger went into effect on 1 January 2025.

== Economy and infrastructure ==
Agricultural activities in the area include the farming of cereals, fodder crops, and livestock. While Ponthaux has retained its agricultural character, Grolley has experienced some residential development since the 1980s due to its proximity to Fribourg, and it has an industrial park.

Grolley-Ponthaux is located on Swiss main road H157, which connects it to Fribourg in the east and Payerne in the west. It is served by Grolley station on the Fribourg–Yverdon railway, on which RER Fribourg provides regular service to Fribourg/Freiburg and Yverdon-les-Bains.
