= Belfaux =

- Municipality
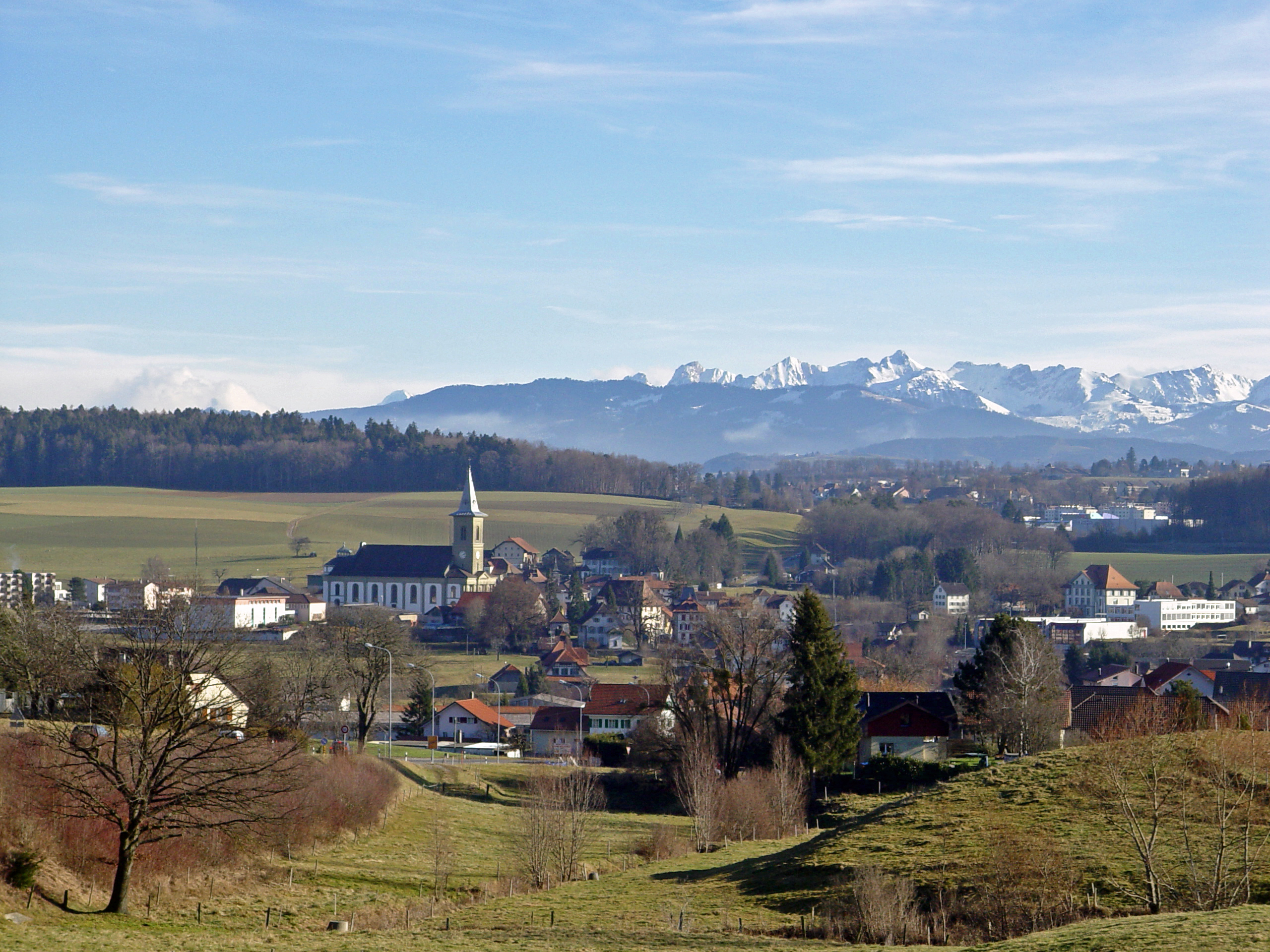
- Belfaux village

- Flag Coat of arms
- Location of Belfaux
- Location within Switzerland Location within Canton of Fribourg
- Coordinates: 46°49′N 7°6′E
- Country: Switzerland
- Canton: Fribourg
- District: Sarine

Government
  - Mayor: Syndic

Area
  - Total: 6.43 km^{2} (2.48 sq mi)
- Elevation: 584 m (1,916 ft)

Population (December 2020)
  - Total: 3,342
  - Density: 520/km^{2} (1,350/sq mi)
- Time zone: UTC+01:00 (CET)
  - Summer (DST): UTC+02:00 (CEST)
- Postal code: 1782
- SFOS number: 2175
- ISO 3166 code: CH-FR
- Surrounded by: Corminboeuf, Givisiez, Grolley-Ponthaux, La Sonnaz, Misery-Courtion
- Website: belfaux.ch

Belfaux (French: [bɛlfo]; Arpitan: Bélfox, locally Bifou [biˈfu]) is a municipality in the district of Sarine in the canton of Fribourg in Switzerland. Its former German name was Gumschen, but this is no longer in use.

== History ==
Belfaux is first mentioned in the 12th century as Bellofago. In 1229 it was mentioned as Bellfozen. The municipality was formerly known by its German name Gumschen, however, that name is no longer used.

On 1 January 2016, Belfaux annexed the neighboring municipality of Autafond.

== Geography ==
Belfaux has an area, as of 2009, of 6.5 square kilometers (2.5 mi^{2}). Of this area, 3.45 km^{2} (1.33 mi^{2}) or 53.4% is used for agricultural purposes, while 2 km^{2} (0.77 mi^{2}) or 31.0% is forested. Of the rest of the land, 0.94 km^{2} (0.36 mi^{2}) or 14.6% is settled (buildings or roads), 0.03 km^{2} (7.4 acres) or 0.5% is either rivers or lakes and 0.01 km^{2} (2.5 acres) or 0.2% is unproductive land.

Of the built up area, housing and buildings made up 9.4% and transportation infrastructure made up 3.6%. Out of the forested land, 28.9% of the total land area is heavily forested and 2.0% is covered with orchards or small clusters of trees. Of the agricultural land, 35.6% is used for growing crops and 16.6% is pastures, while 1.2% is used for orchards or vine crops. Of the water in the municipality, 0.2% is in lakes and 0.3% is in rivers and streams.

The municipality is located in the Sarine district. It consists of the villages of Belfaux, Cutterwil and Autafond.

== Coat of arms ==
The blazon of the municipal coat of arms is Or a doe Sable langued Gules statant on a coupeau Vert and in chief sinister a rose of the Third barbed in the Fourth and seeded of the First.

== Demographics ==
Belfaux has a population (as of December 2020) of 3,342. As of 2008, 20.9% of the population are resident foreign nationals. Over the last 10 years (2000–2010) the population has changed at a rate of 18.1%. Migration accounted for 11.6%, while births and deaths accounted for 6.5%.

Most of the population (as of 2000) speaks French (1,890 or 85.4%) as their first language, German is the second most common (166 or 7.5%) and Macedonian is the third (34 or 1.5%). There are 15 people who speak Italian.

As of 2008, the population was 50.6% male and 49.4% female. The population was made up of 1,007 Swiss men (38.9% of the population) and 304 (11.7%) non-Swiss men. There were 1,031 Swiss women (39.8%) and 248 (9.6%) non-Swiss women. Of the population in the municipality, 572 or about 25.8% were born in Belfaux and lived there in 2000. There were 909 or 41.1% who were born in the same canton, while 327 or 14.8% were born somewhere else in Switzerland, and 332 or 15.0% were born outside of Switzerland.

As of 2000, children and teenagers (0–19 years old) make up 27.3% of the population, while adults (20–64 years old) make up 61.8% and senior citizens (over 64 years old) make up 10.9%.

As of 2000, there were 972 people who were single and never married in the municipality. There were 1,075 married individuals, 84 widows or widowers and 83 individuals who are divorced.

As of 2000, there were 836 private households in the municipality, and an average of 2.6 persons per household. There were 212 households that consist of only one person and 85 households with five or more people. In 2000, a total of 793 apartments (91.3% of the total) were permanently occupied, while 51 apartments (5.9%) were seasonally occupied and 25 apartments (2.9%) were empty. As of 2009, the construction rate of new housing units was 35.2 new units per 1000 residents. The vacancy rate for the municipality, in 2010, was 1.15%.

The historical population is given in the following chart:

== Heritage sites of national significance ==
The Saint-Etienne Church and the mansion de Lanthen-Heid are listed as Swiss heritage site of national significance.

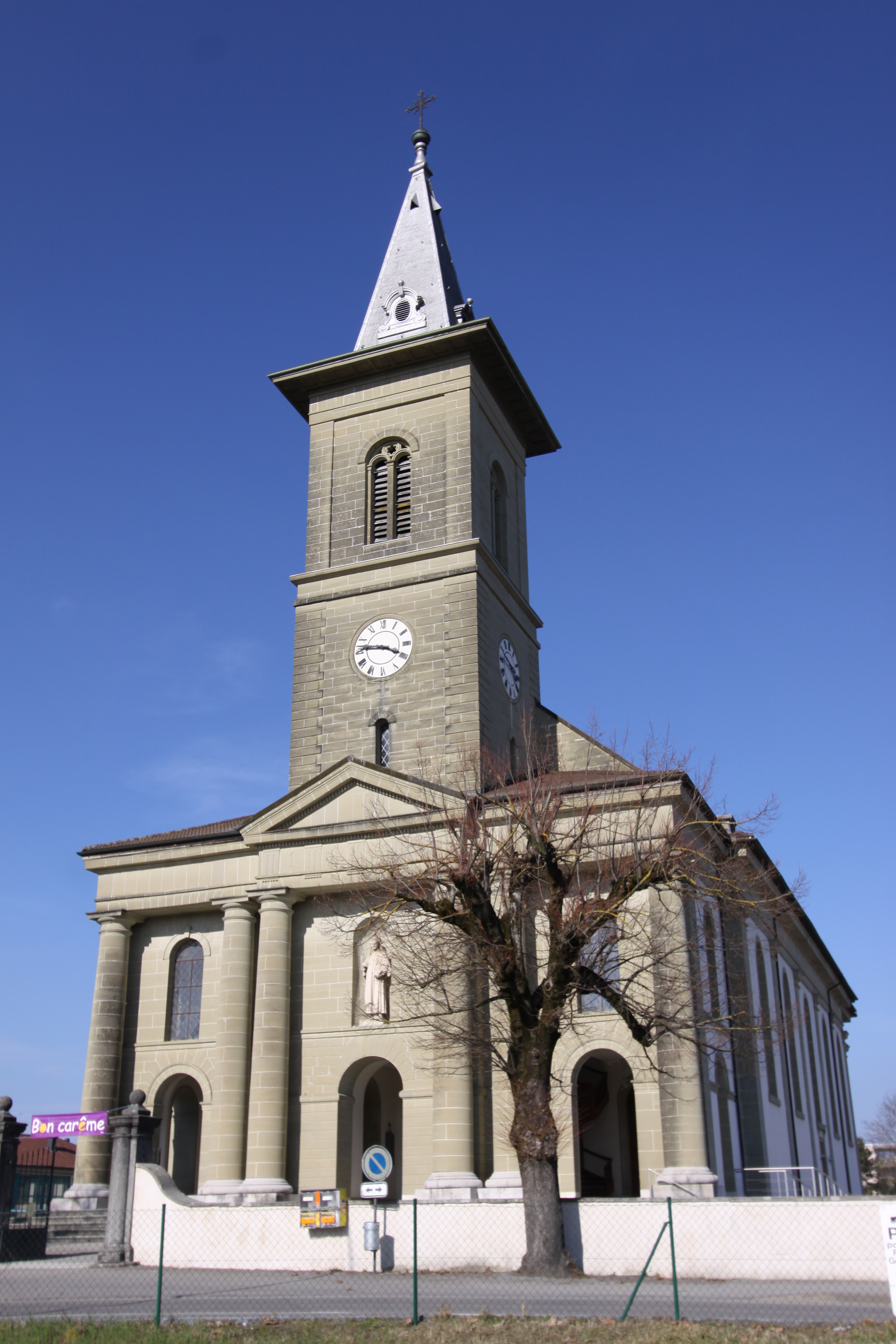
Saint-Etienne Church

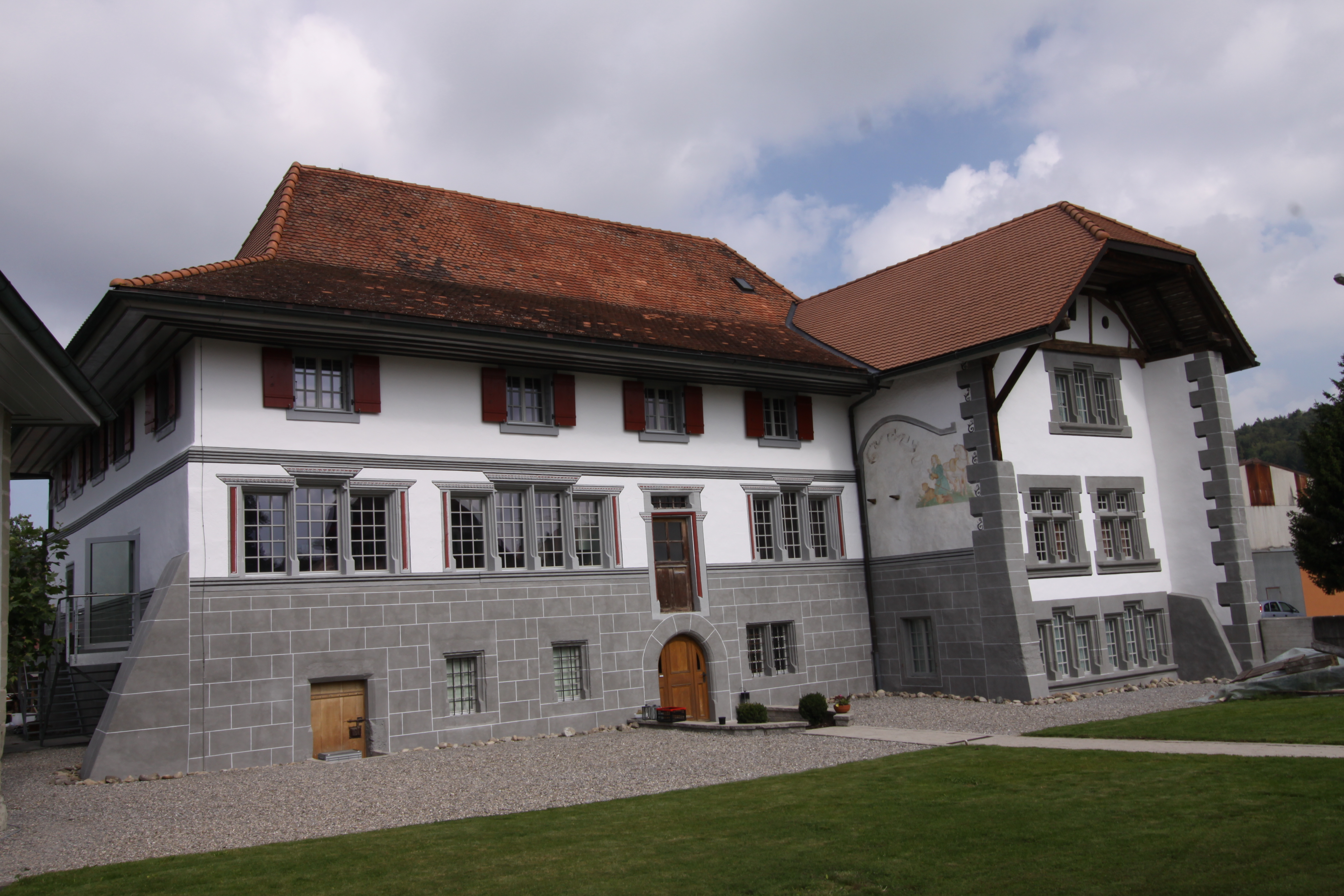
Mansion de Lanthen-Heid

== Politics ==
In the 2011 federal election the most popular party was the SPS which received 37.9% of the vote. The next three most popular parties were the CVP (26.1%), the SVP (12.2%) and the FDP (6.3%).

The SPS received about the same percentage of the vote as they did in the 2007 Federal election (37.1% in 2007 vs 37.9% in 2011). The CVP retained about the same popularity (26.9% in 2007), the SVP retained about the same popularity (13.9% in 2007) and the FDP retained about the same popularity (7.0% in 2007). A total of 877 votes were cast in this election, of which 15 or 1.7% were invalid.

== Economy ==
As of 2010, Belfaux had an unemployment rate of 3.5%. As of 2008, there were 47 people employed in the primary economic sector and about 16 businesses involved in this sector. 170 people were employed in the secondary sector and there were 17 businesses in this sector. 281 people were employed in the tertiary sector, with 52 businesses in this sector. There were 1,132 residents of the municipality who were employed in some capacity, of which females made up 43.0% of the workforce.

In 2008 the total number of full-time equivalent jobs was 396. The number of jobs in the primary sector was 36, of which 27 were in agriculture, 8 were in forestry or lumber production and 1 was in fishing or fisheries. The number of jobs in the secondary sector was 161 of which 87 or (54.0%) were in manufacturing and 74 (46.0%) were in construction. The number of jobs in the tertiary sector was 199. In the tertiary sector; 67 or 33.7% were in wholesale or retail sales or the repair of motor vehicles, 5 or 2.5% were in the movement and storage of goods, 20 or 10.1% were in a hotel or restaurant, 2 or 1.0% were in the information industry, 10 or 5.0% were the insurance or financial industry, 15 or 7.5% were technical professionals or scientists, 17 or 8.5% were in education and 13 or 6.5% were in health care.

In 2000, there were 288 workers who commuted into the municipality and 889 workers who commuted away. The municipality is a net exporter of workers, with about 3.1 workers leaving the municipality for every one entering. Of the working population, 17% used public transportation to get to work, and 66.4% used a private car.

== Religion ==
From the 2000 census, 1,706 or 77.1% were Roman Catholic, while 162 or 7.3% belonged to the Swiss Reformed Church. Of the rest of the population, there were 52 members of an Orthodox church (or about 2.35% of the population), and there were 48 individuals (or about 2.17% of the population) who belonged to another Christian church. There were 50 (or about 2.26% of the population) who were Islamic. There were 4 individuals who were Buddhist and 4 individuals who belonged to another church. 114 (or about 5.15% of the population) belonged to no church, are agnostic or atheist, and 98 individuals (or about 4.43% of the population) did not answer the question.

== Education ==
In Belfaux about 745 or (33.6%) of the population have completed non-mandatory upper secondary education, and 328 or (14.8%) have completed additional higher education (either university or a Fachhochschule). Of the 328 who completed tertiary schooling, 64.0% were Swiss men, 25.9% were Swiss women, 7.3% were non-Swiss men and 2.7% were non-Swiss women.

The Canton of Fribourg school system provides one year of non-obligatory Kindergarten, followed by six years of Primary school. This is followed by three years of obligatory lower Secondary school where the students are separated according to ability and aptitude. Following the lower Secondary students may attend a three or four year optional upper Secondary school. The upper Secondary school is divided into gymnasium (university preparatory) and vocational programs. After they finish the upper Secondary program, students may choose to attend a Tertiary school or continue their apprenticeship.

During the 2010–11 school year, there were a total of 277 students attending 14 classes in Belfaux. A total of 547 students from the municipality attended any school, either in the municipality or outside of it. There were 2 kindergarten classes with a total of 45 students in the municipality. The municipality had 11 primary classes and 223 students. During the same year, there were no lower secondary classes in the municipality, but 118 students attended lower secondary school in a neighboring municipality. There were no upper Secondary classes or vocational classes, but there were 70 upper Secondary students and 81 upper Secondary vocational students who attended classes in another municipality. The municipality had one special Tertiary class, with 9 specialized Tertiary students.

As of 2000, there were 63 students in Belfaux who came from another municipality, while 205 residents attended schools outside the municipality.

== Transportation ==
The municipality has two railway stations, Belfaux-Village and Belfaux CFF. They are located on the Fribourg–Ins and Fribourg–Yverdon lines, respectively, and between them have regular service to Fribourg/Freiburg, Yverdon-les-Bains, Ins, and Neuchâtel.
