= Montagny-les-Monts =

Former municipality, canton of Fribourg

- Former municipality
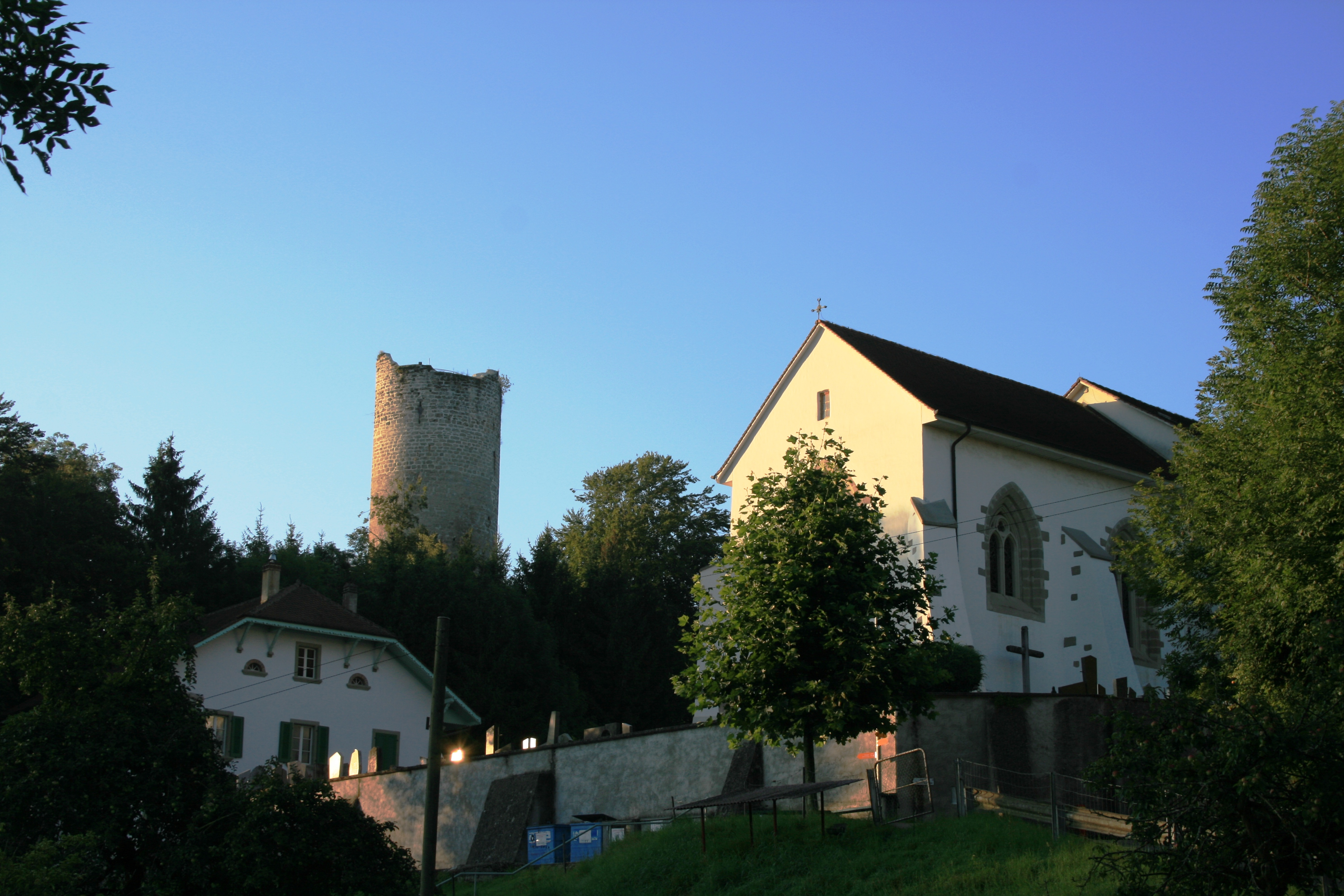
- Church and castle tower

- Coat of arms
- Location of Montagny-les-Monts
- Location within Switzerland Location within Canton of Fribourg
- Coordinates: 46.8094°N 6.9907°E
- Country: Switzerland
- Canton: Fribourg
- District: Broye
- Municipality: Montagny

Population (1999)
  - Total: 864
- Time zone: UTC+01:00 (CET)
  - Summer (DST): UTC+02:00 (CEST)
- ISO 3166 code: CH-FR
- Website

Montagny-les-Monts is a former municipality in the Broye district of the canton of Fribourg, Switzerland, on the left bank of the Arbogne. It comprised the villages of Montagny-les-Monts and Cousset, the hamlets of Les Arbognes and Villarey, and the enclave of Tours. In 2000 it merged with Montagny-la-Ville to form the municipality of Montagny.

== History ==
Montagny-les-Monts is first mentioned in 1146 as castrum Montaniacum; its former German name is Montenach-Berg. Archaeological remains include traces from the Mesolithic, graves from the Bronze Age and the Hallstatt period, and a Gallo-Roman villa at Tours. In the Middle Ages Montagny-les-Monts was the center of the lordship of Montagny, which Fribourg acquired in 1478 and made a bailiwick. Montagny-les-Monts then belonged to the districts of Payerne (from 1798), Montagny (from 1803), Dompierre (from 1831) and Broye (from 1848).

Of the castle, which was plundered in 1476, burned in 1504, restored in 1509 and 1752 and used as a quarry from 1802, only a 13th-century tower remains. The castle chapel (14th century) forms the choir of the present church, which is dedicated to the Immaculate Conception, rebuilt in 1760 and enlarged in 1926. The parish of Montagny-les-Monts, originally based at Tours, included Montagny-la-Ville and Mannens-Grandsivaz, which became separate in 1874.

In 1876 Montagny-les-Monts received a station at Cousset on the Fribourg–Payerne railway line. A dairy society was founded in 1889. In the 19th century there were mills, a sawmill and an oil mill. Watchmaking was carried on from 1964 to 1983, and a factory of the Fabriques de tabac réunies operated from 1964 to 1987. The Fondation Général Nicolas de Gady was set up in 1989 to preserve the tower.

Montagny-les-Monts had 284 inhabitants in 1811, 615 in 1850, 774 in 1900, 752 in 1950, 754 in 1990 and 864 in 1999. In 2000 it merged with Montagny-la-Ville to form Montagny.

== Bibliography ==
- A. Dellion, Dictionnaire historique et statistique des paroisses catholiques du canton de Fribourg, 8, pp. 417–436
- M.-H. Bossy, Evolution et avenir économique de la commune de Montagny-les-Monts, licentiate thesis, Fribourg, 1968
- B. de Vevey, Châteaux et maisons fortes du canton de Fribourg, 1978, pp. 243–249
- Archéologie fribourgeoise, 1989/1992, pp. 101–105
