= Misery-Courtion =

- Municipality
- Coat of arms
- Location of Misery-Courtion
- Location within Switzerland Location within Canton of Fribourg
- Coordinates: 46°51′N 7°4′E
- Country: Switzerland
- Canton: Fribourg
- District: See

Government
  - Executive: Conseil communal with 9 members
  - Mayor: Syndic

Area
  - Total: 11.42 km^{2} (4.41 sq mi)
- Elevation: 580 m (1,900 ft)

Population (December 2020)
  - Total: 2,225
  - Density: 194.8/km^{2} (504.6/sq mi)
- Time zone: UTC+01:00 (CET)
  - Summer (DST): UTC+02:00 (CEST)
- Postal code: 1721
- SFOS number: 2272
- ISO 3166 code: CH-FR
- Surrounded by: Avenches (VD), Belfaux, Belmont-Broye, Courtepin, Grolley-Ponthaux, La Sonnaz
- Website: www.misery-courtion.ch

Misery-Courtion (French: [mizəʁi kuʁtijɔ̃]; Arpitan: Miseri-Cortion) is a municipality in the district of See in the canton of Fribourg in Switzerland. It was formed on January 1, 1997 by the union of the villages of Misery, Courtion, Cormérod, and Cournillens.

== Geography ==
Misery-Courtion has an area of 11.38 km^{2} (4.39 sq mi). Of this area, 8.6 km^{2} (3.3 mi^{2}) or 75.4% is used for agricultural purposes, while 1.98 km^{2} (0.76 mi^{2}) or 17.4% is forested. Of the rest of the land, 0.82 km^{2} (0.32 mi^{2}) or 7.2% is settled (buildings or roads), 0.03 km^{2} (7.4 acres) or 0.3% is either rivers or lakes.

Of the built up area, housing and buildings made up 3.6% and transportation infrastructure made up 2.4%. Out of the forested land, all of the forested land area is covered with heavy forests. Of the agricultural land, 53.3% is used for growing crops and 20.7% is pastures, while 1.4% is used for orchards or vine crops. All the water in the municipality is flowing water.

The municipality is located in the See/Lac district.

== Coat of arms ==
The blazon of the municipal coat of arms is Per bend Or and Gules overall a Quatrefoil Vert slipped. The four leaved clover stands for the four former municipalities of Cormerod, Cournillens, Courtion and Misery.

== Demographics ==
Misery-Courtion has a population (as of December 2020) of 2,225. As of 2008, 13.7% of the population are resident foreign nationals. Over the last 10 years (2000–2010) the population has changed at a rate of 17.5%. Migration accounted for 10.8%, while births and deaths accounted for 4.5%.

Most of the population (as of 2000) speaks French (1,064 or 86.4%) as their first language, German is the second most common (114 or 9.3%) and Portuguese is the third (14 or 1.1%). There are 6 people who speak Italian.

As of 2008, the population was 52.6% male and 47.4% female. The population was made up of 642 Swiss men (44.2% of the population) and 123 (8.5%) non-Swiss men. There were 601 Swiss women (41.4%) and 87 (6.0%) non-Swiss women. Of the population in the municipality, 470 or about 38.1% were born in Misery-Courtion and lived there in 2000. There were 409 or 33.2% who were born in the same canton, while 191 or 15.5% were born somewhere else in Switzerland, and 117 or 9.5% were born outside of Switzerland.

As of 2000, children and teenagers (0–19 years old) make up 27.5% of the population, while adults (20–64 years old) make up 58.9% and seniors (over 64 years old) make up 13.6%.

As of 2000, there were 535 people who were single and never married in the municipality. There were 582 married individuals, 64 widows or widowers and 51 individuals who are divorced.

As of 2000, there were 448 private households in the municipality, and an average of 2.7 persons per household. There were 98 households that consist of only one person and 48 households with five or more people. In 2000, a total of 432 apartments (89.1% of the total) were permanently occupied, while 37 apartments (7.6%) were seasonally occupied and 16 apartments (3.3%) were empty. As of 2009, the construction rate of new housing units was 11.1 new units per 1000 residents. The vacancy rate for the municipality, in 2010, was 0.34%.

The historical population is given in the following chart:

== Politics ==
In the 2011 federal election the most popular party was the CVP which received 29.7% of the vote. The next three most popular parties were the SVP (26.6%), the SPS (19.3%) and the FDP (6.4%).

The CVP improved their position in Misery-Courtion rising to first, from third in 2007 (with 23.2%) The SVP retained about the same popularity (24.8% in 2007), the SPS moved from first in 2007 (with 27.3%) to third and the FDP retained about the same popularity (7.9% in 2007). A total of 411 votes were cast in this election, of which 9 or 2.2% were invalid.

== Economy ==
As of 2010, Misery-Courtion had an unemployment rate of 2.3%. As of 2008, there were 117 people employed in the primary economic sector and about 40 businesses involved in this sector. 61 people were employed in the secondary sector and there were 8 businesses in this sector. 140 people were employed in the tertiary sector, with 25 businesses in this sector. There were 620 residents of the municipality who were employed in some capacity, of which females made up 41.5% of the workforce.

In 2008 the total number of full-time equivalent jobs was 255. The number of jobs in the primary sector was 89, of which 76 were in agriculture and 13 were in forestry or lumber production. The number of jobs in the secondary sector was 56 of which 25 or (44.6%) were in manufacturing and 31 (55.4%) were in construction. The number of jobs in the tertiary sector was 110. In the tertiary sector; 16 or 14.5% were in wholesale or retail sales or the repair of motor vehicles, 2 or 1.8% were in the movement and storage of goods, 14 or 12.7% were in a hotel or restaurant, 4 or 3.6% were in the information industry, 3 or 2.7% were technical professionals or scientists, 9 or 8.2% were in education and 47 or 42.7% were in health care.

In 2000, there were 62 workers who commuted into the municipality and 463 workers who commuted away. The municipality is a net exporter of workers, with about 7.5 workers leaving the municipality for every one entering. Of the working population, 8.9% used public transportation to get to work, and 70.2% used a private car.

== Religion ==
From the 2000 census, 950 or 77.1% were Roman Catholic, while 118 or 9.6% belonged to the Swiss Reformed Church. Of the rest of the population, there were 9 members of an Orthodox church (or about 0.73% of the population), and there were 10 individuals (or about 0.81% of the population) who belonged to another Christian church. There was 1 individual who was Jewish, and 19 (or about 1.54% of the population) who were Islamic. There were 2 individuals who were Buddhist and 1 individual who belonged to another church. 64 (or about 5.19% of the population) belonged to no church, are agnostic or atheist, and 63 individuals (or about 5.11% of the population) did not answer the question.

== Education ==
In Misery-Courtion about 377 or (30.6%) of the population have completed non-mandatory upper secondary education, and 129 or (10.5%) have completed additional higher education (either university or a Fachhochschule). Of the 129 who completed tertiary schooling, 62.8% were Swiss men, 21.7% were Swiss women, 8.5% were non-Swiss men and 7.0% were non-Swiss women.

The Canton of Fribourg school system provides one year of non-obligatory Kindergarten, followed by six years of Primary school. This is followed by three years of obligatory lower Secondary school where the students are separated according to ability and aptitude. Following the lower Secondary students may attend a three or four year optional upper Secondary school. The upper Secondary school is divided into gymnasium (university preparatory) and vocational programs. After they finish the upper Secondary program, students may choose to attend a Tertiary school or continue their apprenticeship.

During the 2010-11 school year, there were a total of 154 students attending 8 classes in Misery-Courtion. A total of 262 students from the municipality attended any school, either in the municipality or outside of it. There were no kindergarten classes in the municipality, but 18 students attended kindergarten in a neighboring municipality. The municipality had 8 primary classes and 154 students. During the same year, there were no lower secondary classes in the municipality, but 45 students attended lower secondary school in a neighboring municipality. There were no upper Secondary classes or vocational classes, but there were 34 upper Secondary students and 47 upper Secondary vocational students who attended classes in another municipality. The municipality had no non-university Tertiary classes, but there were 8 non-university Tertiary students and one specialized Tertiary student who attended classes in another municipality.

As of 2000, there were 104 students from Misery-Courtion who attended schools outside the municipality.
