= Montagny, Fribourg =

Montagny
- Municipality
- Flag Coat of arms
- Location of Montagny
- Location within Switzerland Location within Canton of Fribourg
- Coordinates: 46°49′N 7°0′E
- Country: Switzerland
- Canton: Fribourg
- District: Broye

Government
  - Mayor: Syndic

Area
  - Total: 17.52 km^{2} (6.76 sq mi)
- Elevation: 563 m (1,847 ft)

Population (December 2020)
  - Total: 2,712
  - Density: 154.8/km^{2} (400.9/sq mi)
- Time zone: UTC+01:00 (CET)
  - Summer (DST): UTC+02:00 (CEST)
- Postal codes: 1774 Montagny-les-Monts; 1776 Montagny-la-Ville; 1775 Mannens-Grandsivaz
- SFOS number: 2029
- ISO 3166 code: CH-FR
- Surrounded by: Belmont-Broye, Corcelles-près-Payerne (VD), Grolley-Ponthaux, Payerne (VD), Prez, Torny
- Website: montagny-fr.ch

Montagny (French: [mɔ̃taɲi]; Arpitan: Montagni) is a municipality in the district of Broye, in the canton of Fribourg, Switzerland. In 2000 the municipality was created when Montagny-les-Monts and Montagny-la-Ville merged. On 1 January 2004 the former municipality of Mannens-Grandsivaz merged into the municipality of Montagny (FR).

== History ==
Montagny was created in 2000.

== Geography ==
Montagny has an area, as of 2009, of 17.5 square kilometers (6.8 mi^{2}). Of this area, 10.03 km^{2} (3.87 mi^{2}) or 57.2% is used for agricultural purposes, while 5.91 km^{2} (2.28 mi^{2}) or 33.7% is forested. Of the rest of the land, 1.44 km^{2} (0.56 mi^{2}) or 8.2% is settled (buildings or roads), 0.06 km^{2} (15 acres) or 0.3% is either rivers or lakes and 0.08 km^{2} (20 acres) or 0.5% is unproductive land.

Of the built up area, housing and buildings made up 4.4% and transportation infrastructure made up 2.5%. Out of the forested land, 31.9% of the total land area is heavily forested and 1.8% is covered with orchards or small clusters of trees. Of the agricultural land, 35.0% is used for growing crops and 20.7% is pastures, while 1.5% is used for orchards or vine crops. All the water in the municipality is flowing water.

It consists of the villages of Montagny-la-Ville, Montagny-les-Monts, Mannens-Grandsivaz and Cousset along with the hamlets of Tours, Les Arbognes and Le Grabou.

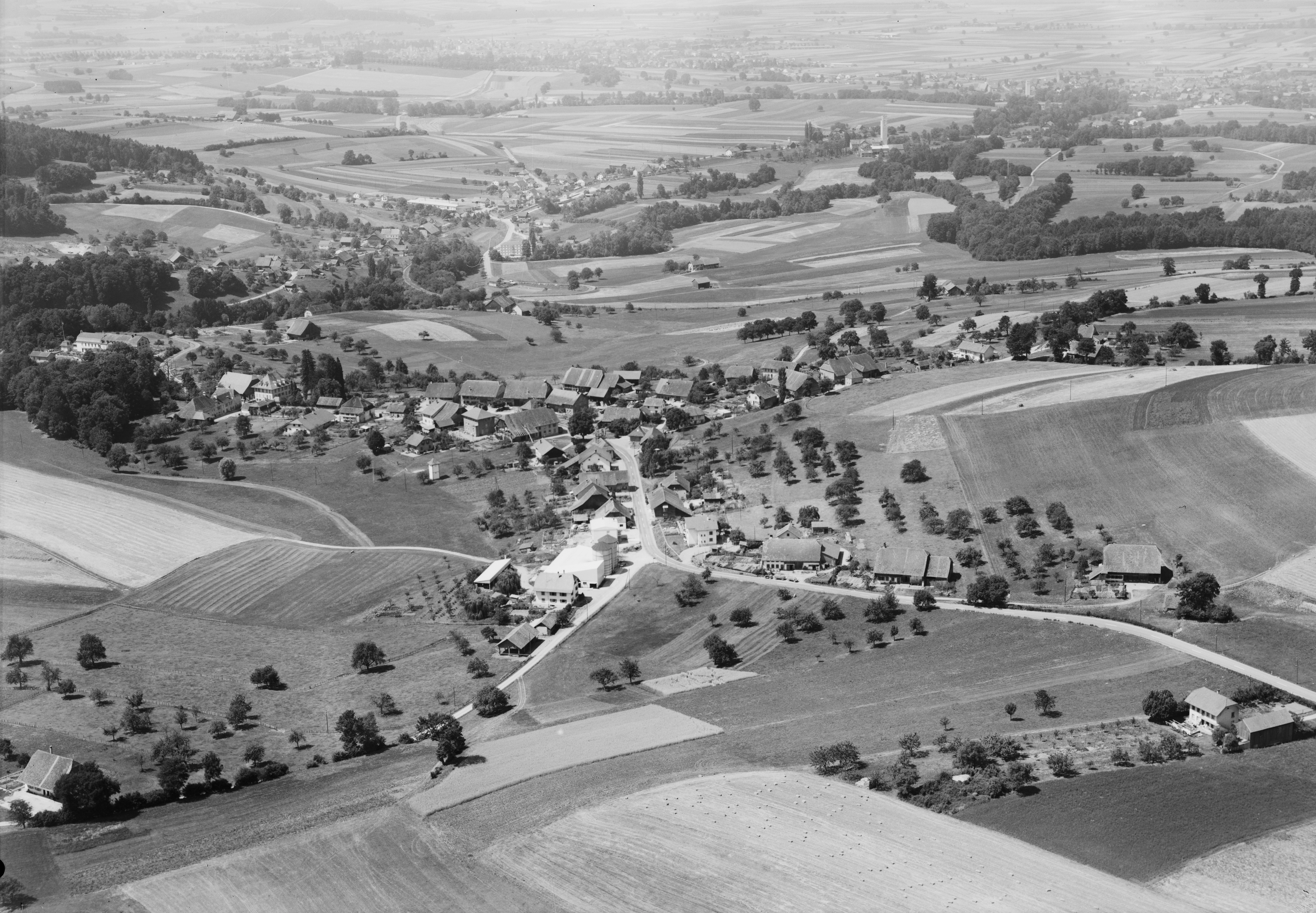
Aerial view (1964)

Aerial view (1964)

== Coat of arms ==
The blazon of the municipal coat of arms is Paly of six Or and Gules and a Chief Argent. The coat of arms combines elements from the former municipalities of Montagny-la-Ville and Montagny-les-Monts.

== Demographics ==
Montagny has a population (as of December 2020) of 2,712. As of 2008, 7.1% of the population are resident foreign nationals. Over the last 10 years (2000–2010) the population has changed at a rate of 14.7%. Migration accounted for 10.3%, while births and deaths accounted for 2.8%.

Most of the population (as of 2000) speaks French (1,169 or 90.6%) as their first language, German is the second most common (68 or 5.3%) and Portuguese is the third (17 or 1.3%). There are 10 people who speak Italian.

As of 2008, the population was 48.5% male and 51.5% female. The population was made up of 901 Swiss men (44.4% of the population) and 83 (4.1%) non-Swiss men. There were 976 Swiss women (48.1%) and 69 (3.4%) non-Swiss women. Of the population in the municipality, 532 or about 41.2% were born in Montagny and lived there in 2000. There were 382 or 29.6% who were born in the same canton, while 223 or 17.3% were born somewhere else in Switzerland, and 112 or 8.7% were born outside of Switzerland.

The age distribution, as of 2000, in Montagny is; 242 children or 13.7% of the population are between 0 and 9 years old and 224 teenagers or 12.7% are between 10 and 19. Of the adult population, 213 people or 12.1% of the population are between 20 and 29 years old. 296 people or 16.8% are between 30 and 39, 244 people or 13.8% are between 40 and 49, and 227 people or 12.9% are between 50 and 59. The senior population distribution is 132 people or 7.5% of the population are between 60 and 69 years old, 117 people or 6.6% are between 70 and 79, there are 58 people or 3.3% who are between 80 and 89, and there are 9 people or 0.5% who are 90 and older.

As of 2000, there were 517 people who were single and never married in the municipality. There were 663 married individuals, 73 widows or widowers and 37 individuals who are divorced.

As of 2000, there were 663 private households in the municipality, and an average of 2.6 persons per household. There were 138 households that consist of only one person and 43 households with five or more people. In 2000, a total of 472 apartments (90.9% of the total) were permanently occupied, while 27 apartments (5.2%) were seasonally occupied and 20 apartments (3.9%) were empty. As of 2009, the construction rate of new housing units was 6.8 new units per 1000 residents. The vacancy rate for the municipality, in 2010, was 0.85%.

The historical population is given in the following chart:

== Heritage sites of national significance ==
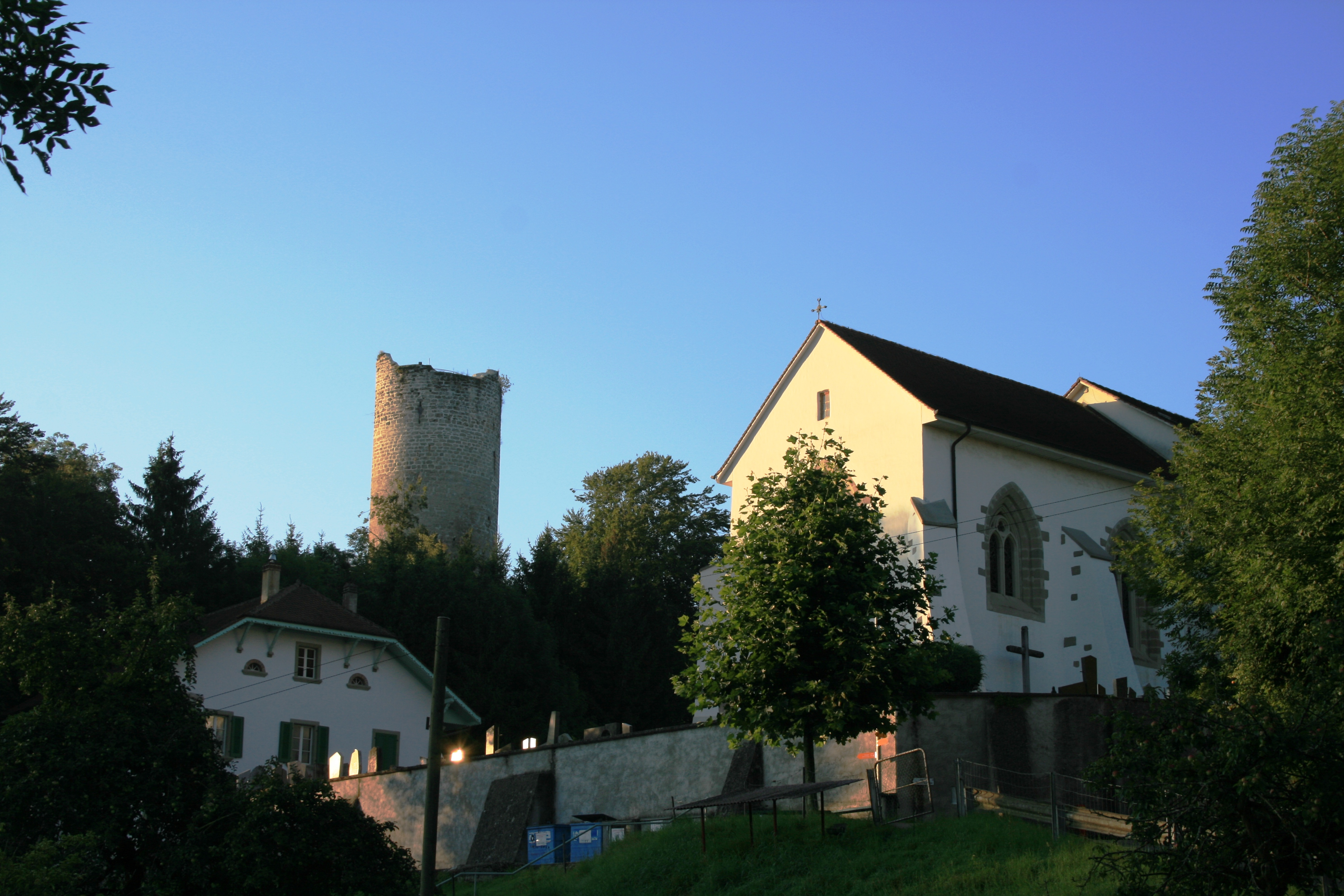
Notre-Dame Church

The Notre-Dame Church is listed as a Swiss heritage site of national significance. The Montagny-les-Monts area is part of the Inventory of Swiss Heritage Sites.

== Politics ==
In the 2011 federal election the most popular party was the SP which received 27.2% of the vote. The next three most popular parties were the SVP (24.5%), the CVP (22.4%) and the FDP (9.4%).

The SPS improved their position in Montagny rising to first, from third in 2007 (with 24.3%) The SVP moved from first in 2007 (with 28.2%) to second in 2011, the CVP moved from second in 2007 (with 25.1%) to third and the FDP retained about the same popularity (9.5% in 2007). A total of 637 votes were cast in this election, of which 6 or 0.9% were invalid.

== Economy ==
As of 2010, Montagny had an unemployment rate of 1.6%. As of 2008, there were 130 people employed in the primary economic sector and about 43 businesses involved in this sector. 69 people were employed in the secondary sector and there were 19 businesses in this sector. 240 people were employed in the tertiary sector, with 47 businesses in this sector. There were 641 residents of the municipality who were employed in some capacity, of which females made up 43.4% of the workforce.

In 2008 the total number of full-time equivalent jobs was 345. The number of jobs in the primary sector was 102, of which 92 were in agriculture and 10 were in forestry or lumber production. The number of jobs in the secondary sector was 63 of which 45 or (71.4%) were in manufacturing and 18 (28.6%) were in construction. The number of jobs in the tertiary sector was 180. In the tertiary sector; 55 or 30.6% were in wholesale or retail sales or the repair of motor vehicles, 6 or 3.3% were in the movement and storage of goods, 14 or 7.8% were in a hotel or restaurant, 2 or 1.1% were in the information industry, 5 or 2.8% were the insurance or financial industry, 9 or 5.0% were technical professionals or scientists, 13 or 7.2% were in education and 51 or 28.3% were in health care.

In 2000, there were 123 workers who commuted into the municipality and 469 workers who commuted away. The municipality is a net exporter of workers, with about 3.8 workers leaving the municipality for every one entering. Of the working population, 7.4% used public transportation to get to work, and 72.3% used a private car.

== Religion ==
From the 2000 census, 997 or 77.3% were Roman Catholic, while 131 or 10.2% belonged to the Swiss Reformed Church. Of the rest of the population, there were 4 individuals (or about 0.31% of the population) who belonged to the Christian Catholic Church, and there were 42 individuals (or about 3.26% of the population) who belonged to another Christian church. There were 6 individuals (or about 0.47% of the population) who were Jewish, and 20 (or about 1.55% of the population) who were Islamic. There was 1 person who was Hindu. 67 (or about 5.19% of the population) belonged to no church, are agnostic or atheist, and 43 individuals (or about 3.33% of the population) did not answer the question.

== Education ==
In Montagny about 422 or (32.7%) of the population have completed non-mandatory upper secondary education, and 114 or (8.8%) have completed additional higher education (either university or a Fachhochschule). Of the 114 who completed tertiary schooling, 63.2% were Swiss men, 21.9% were Swiss women, 10.5% were non-Swiss men and 4.4% were non-Swiss women.

The Canton of Fribourg school system provides one year of non-obligatory Kindergarten, followed by six years of Primary school. This is followed by three years of obligatory lower Secondary school where the students are separated according to ability and aptitude. Following the lower Secondary students may attend a three or four year optional upper Secondary school. The upper Secondary school is divided into gymnasium (university preparatory) and vocational programs. After they finish the upper Secondary program, students may choose to attend a Tertiary school or continue their apprenticeship.

During the 2010–11 school year, there were a total of 192 students attending 10 classes in Montagny. A total of 351 students from the municipality attended any school, either in the municipality or outside of it. There was one kindergarten class with a total of 21 students in the municipality. The municipality had 9 primary classes and 171 students. During the same year, there were no lower secondary classes in the municipality, but 81 students attended lower secondary school in a neighboring municipality. There were no upper Secondary classes or vocational classes, but there were 4 upper Secondary students and 53 upper Secondary vocational students who attended classes in another municipality. The municipality had no non-university Tertiary classes, but there were 3 non-university Tertiary students and 5 specialized Tertiary students who attended classes in another municipality.

As of 2000, there were 44 students in Montagny who came from another municipality, while 147 residents attended schools outside the municipality.

== Transportation ==
The municipality has a railway station, Cousset, on the Fribourg–Yverdon line. It has regular service Fribourg/Freiburg and Yverdon-les-Bains.
