= Autafond =

- Former municipality
- Coat of arms
- Location of Autafond
- Location within Switzerland Location within Canton of Fribourg
- Coordinates: 46°49′N 7°5′E
- Country: Switzerland
- Canton: Fribourg
- District: Sarine

Area
  - Total: 2.43 km^{2} (0.94 sq mi)
- Elevation: 656 m (2,152 ft)

Population (Dec 2014)
  - Total: 68
  - Density: 28/km^{2} (72/sq mi)
- Time zone: UTC+01:00 (CET)
  - Summer (DST): UTC+02:00 (CEST)
- Postal code: 1782
- SFOS number: 2172
- ISO 3166 code: CH-FR
- Website: belfaux.ch

Autafond is a former municipality in the district of Sarine in the canton of Fribourg in Switzerland.

On 1 January 2016, Autafond was annexed by the municipality of Belfaux.

== History ==
Autafond is first mentioned in 1236 as Auta-fonz.

== Geography ==
Autafond had an area, as of 2009, of 2.4 square kilometers (0.93 mi^{2}). Of this area, 1.61 km^{2} (0.62 mi^{2}) or 66.5% is used for agricultural purposes, while 0.73 km^{2} (0.28 mi^{2}) or 30.2% is forested. Of the rest of the land, 0.09 km^{2} (22 acres) or 3.7% is settled (buildings or roads).

Of the built up area, housing and buildings made up 0.8% and transportation infrastructure made up 2.1%. Out of the forested land, 28.1% of the total land area is heavily forested and 2.1% is covered with orchards or small clusters of trees. Of the agricultural land, 38.0% is used for growing crops and 27.7% is pastures.

The former municipality is located in the Sarine district.

== Coat of arms ==
The blazon of the municipal coat of arms is Per pale Argent and Gules three Roses counterchanged barbed and seeded proper.

== Demographics ==
Autafond had a population (as of 2014) of 68. As of 2008, 5.8% of the population are resident foreign nationals. Over the last 10 years (2000–2010) the population has changed at a rate of -5.5%. Migration accounted for -5.5%, while births and deaths accounted for 0%.

Most of the population (as of 2000) speaks French (69 or 85.2%) as their first language with the rest speaking German

As of 2008, the population was 55.8% male and 44.2% female. The population was made up of 39 Swiss men (50.6% of the population) and 4 (5.2%) non-Swiss men. There were 33 Swiss women (42.9%) and 1 (1.3%) non-Swiss women. Of the population in the municipality, 35 or about 43.2% were born in Autafond and lived there in 2000. There were 35 or 43.2% who were born in the same canton, while 9 or 11.1% were born somewhere else in Switzerland, and 1 or 1.2% were born outside of Switzerland.

As of 2000, children and teenagers (0–19 years old) make up 33.3% of the population, while adults (20–64 years old) make up 56.8% and seniors (over 64 years old) make up 9.9%.

As of 2000, there were 40 people who were single and never married in the municipality. There were 37 married individuals, 3 widows or widowers and 1 individuals who are divorced.

As of 2000, there were 22 private households in the municipality, and an average of 3.3 persons per household. There were 2 households that consist of only one person and 6 households with five or more people. In 2000, a total of 20 apartments (100.0% of the total) were permanently occupied. As of 2009, the construction rate of new housing units was 14.5 new units per 1000 residents.

The historical population is given in the following chart:

== Politics ==
In the 2011 federal election the most popular party was the CVP which received 41.7% of the vote. The next three most popular parties were the SVP (22.3%), the FDP (21.7%) and the SP (4.7%).

The CVP received about the same percentage of the vote as they did in the 2007 Federal election (46.1% in 2007 vs 41.7% in 2011). The SVP moved from third in 2007 (with 18.0%) to second in 2011, the FDP moved from second in 2007 (with 21.5%) to third and the SPS moved from below fourth place in 2007 to fourth. A total of 45 votes were cast in this election, of which 1 or 2.2% was invalid.

== Economy ==
As of 2010, Autafond had an unemployment rate of 2%. As of 2008, there were 20 people employed in the primary economic sector and about 7 businesses involved in this sector. No one was employed in the secondary sector or the tertiary sector. There were 42 residents of the municipality who were employed in some capacity, of which females made up 31.0% of the workforce.

In 2008 the total number of full-time equivalent jobs was 17, all of which were in agriculture.

In 2000, there were 22 workers who commuted away from the municipality. Of the working population, 4.8% used public transportation to get to work, and 45.2% used a private car.

== Religion ==
From the 2000 census, 67 or 82.7% were Roman Catholic, while 12 or 14.8% belonged to the Swiss Reformed Church. 1 (or about 1.23% of the population) belonged to no church, are agnostic or atheist, and 1 individuals (or about 1.23% of the population) did not answer the question.

== Education ==
In Autafond about 24 or (29.6%) of the population have completed non-mandatory upper secondary education, and 7 or (8.6%) have completed additional higher education (either university or a Fachhochschule). Of the 7 who completed tertiary schooling, 71.4% were Swiss men, 28.6% were Swiss women.

The Canton of Fribourg school system provides one year of non-obligatory Kindergarten, followed by six years of Primary school. This is followed by three years of obligatory lower Secondary school where the students are separated according to ability and aptitude. Following the lower Secondary students may attend a three or four year optional upper Secondary school. The upper Secondary school is divided into gymnasium (university preparatory) and vocational programs. After they finish the upper Secondary program, students may choose to attend a Tertiary school or continue their apprenticeship.

During the 2010–11 school year, there were no students attending school in Autafond, but a total of 15 students attended school in other municipalities. Of these students, one was in kindergarten, 7 were in a primary school, 3 were in a mandatory secondary school, 2 were in an upper secondary school and one was in a vocational secondary program. There was one tertiary student from the municipality.

As of 2000, there were 17 students from Autafond who attended schools outside the municipality.
