= Montagny-la-Ville =

Former municipality, canton of Fribourg

- Former municipality
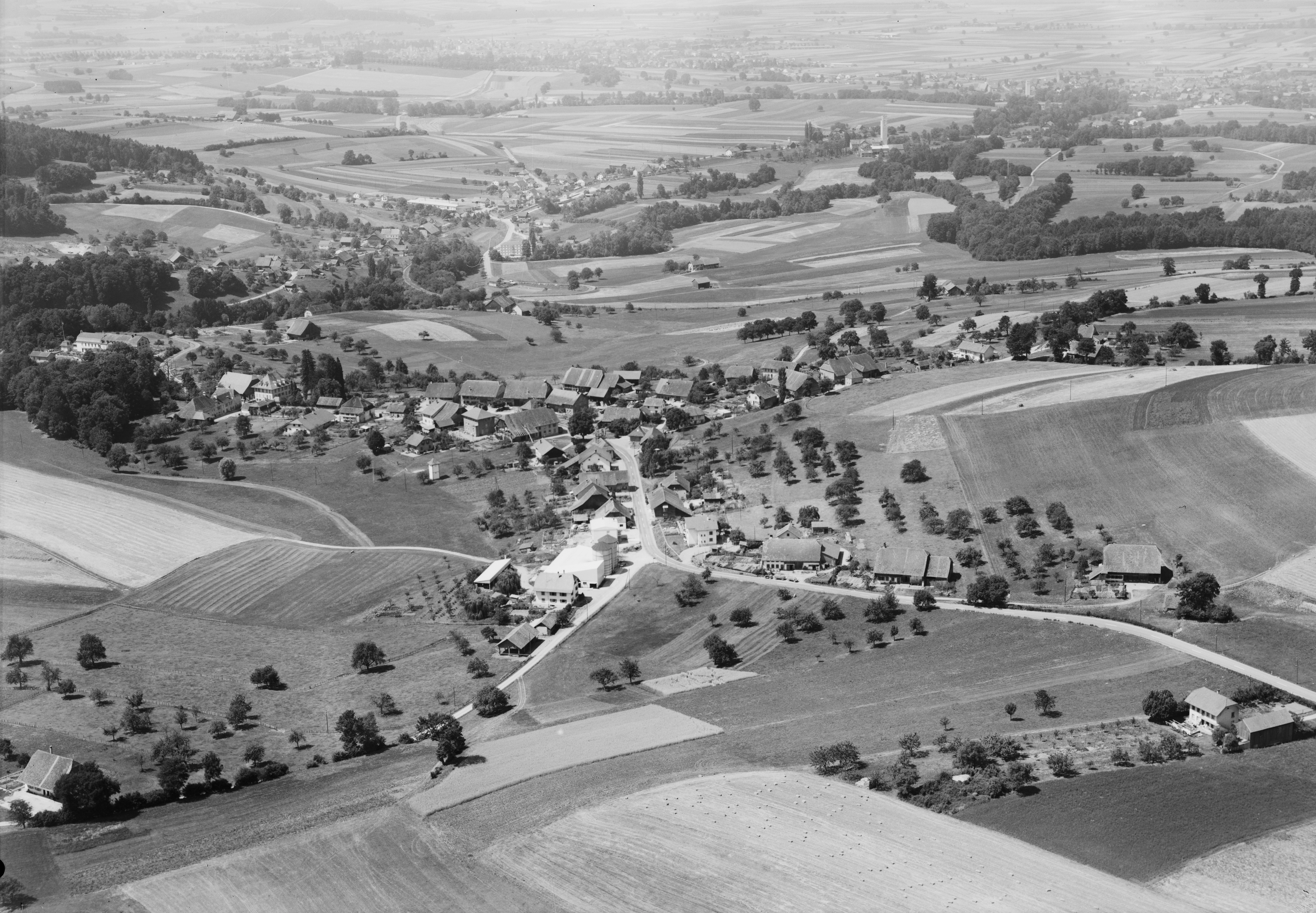
- Aerial view (1964)
- Location of Montagny-la-Ville
- Location within Switzerland Location within Canton of Fribourg
- Coordinates: 46.8174°N 6.9953°E
- Country: Switzerland
- Canton: Fribourg
- District: Broye
- Municipality: Montagny

Population (1999)
  - Total: 457
- Time zone: UTC+01:00 (CET)
  - Summer (DST): UTC+02:00 (CEST)
- ISO 3166 code: CH-FR
- Website

Montagny-la-Ville is a former municipality in the Broye district of the canton of Fribourg, Switzerland, on the right bank of the Arbogne. In 2000 it merged with Montagny-les-Monts to form the municipality of Montagny.

== History ==
Montagny-la-Ville is first mentioned around 1177 as de Montaniaco and in 1320 as Montagnie li villa; its former German name is Montenach-Stadt. Two Iron Age tumuli and the remains of a Roman aqueduct have been found there. Montagny-la-Ville was part of the lordship of Montagny and of the bailiwick of the same name (1478–1798), then of the districts of Payerne, Montagny (from 1803), Dompierre (1831–1848) and Broye (from 1848). In church matters it belongs to the parish of Tours-Montagny. The chapel of Saint Peter dates from the 17th century.

The architect Charles de Castella had several patrician houses built in Montagny-la-Ville, among them those of his own family, of the court clerk (curial) Bielmann and of the von der Weid and Buman families. The Institut des Fauvettes, owned by the Sisters of Providence of Langres, was a girls' orphanage in 1903, with a home economics school from 1905, a boarding school in 1960 and a convalescent home from 1992. A dairy society was founded in 1910. Once focused on agriculture (cereals and livestock), the village is increasingly developing as a residential area.

Montagny-la-Ville had 216 inhabitants in 1811, 280 in 1850, 332 in 1900, 426 in 1950, 464 in 1990 and 457 in 1999. In 2000 it merged with Montagny-les-Monts to form Montagny.

== Bibliography ==
- Ch. Marmy, Le paupérisme rural dans la Broye aux XIXe–XXe siècles, licentiate thesis, Fribourg, 2003
