= S30 (RER Fribourg) =

Railway service in Switzerland

Overview
- First service: 14 December 2014
- Current operator: Swiss Federal Railways

Route
- Termini: Yverdon-les-Bains; Fribourg/Freiburg
- Stops: 19
- Distance travelled: 49.9 kilometres (31.0 mi)
- Average journey time: 54 minutes
- Service frequency: Half-hourly
- Line used: Fribourg–Yverdon line

The S30 is a railway service of RER Fribourg that provides half-hourly service between Yverdon-les-Bains and Fribourg/Freiburg, in the Swiss cantons of Vaud and Fribourg, respectively. Swiss Federal Railways, the national railway company of Switzerland, operates the service.

== Operations ==
The S30 runs half-hourly between Yverdon-les-Bains and Fribourg/Freiburg over the Fribourg–Yverdon line. The line, 49.9 kilometres (31.0 mi) long, connects two major main lines: the Jura Foot and the Lausanne–Bern line. The S30 is the only service over the line.

== History ==
RER Fribourg introduced the S30 designation on 14 December 2014 for a half-hourly service between Yverdon-les-Bains and Fribourg/Freiburg on weekdays until 8 pm. In December 2020, the half-hourly service was extended from weekdays only to every day of the week and further in the evenings.

From 28 June 2025, S30 trains will continue to run on lines S40/S41, offering a new link every half-hour, without changing, between Lausanne and Yverdon-les-Bains, via Fribourg/Freiburg.
