= La Brinaz railway station =

Railway station in Montagny-près-Yverdon, Switzerland

La Brinaz

General information
- Location: Montagny-près-Yverdon; Switzerland
- Coordinates: 46°47′38″N 6°37′12″E
- Elevation: 441 m (1,447 ft)
- Owner: Travys
- Line: Yverdon–Ste-Croix line
- Distance: 2.2 km (1.4 mi) from Yverdon-les-Bains
- Platforms: 1 side platform
- Tracks: 1
- Train operators: Travys
- Connections: CarPostal SA buses; travys buses

Construction
- Accessible: No

Other information
- Station code: 8504291 (BRIN)
- Fare zone: 40 (mobilis)

Services
Preceding station	Travys	Following station
Valeyres-sous-Montagny towards Ste-Croix	R12	Yverdon William Barbey towards Yverdon-les-Bains
Location

La Brinaz railway station (French: Gare de La Brinaz) is a railway station in the municipality of Montagny-près-Yverdon, in the Swiss canton of Vaud. It is an intermediate stop and a request stop on the 1,000 mm (3 ft 3 3/8 in) gauge Yverdon–Ste-Croix line of Travys.

== History ==
Following the December 2024 timetable change, rail services at this station have been limited to shorten travel times along the line and ensure better connections with long-distance trains at Yverdon-les-Bains. Consequently, on weekdays between 5 am and 9 pm, trains no longer stop at this station; instead, a bus service operates between Yverdon-les-Bains and Valeyres-sous-Montagny.

== Services ==
As of the December 2024 timetable change, the following services stop at La Brinaz:

- Regio:
  - Weekdays: hourly service in the early mornings and late evenings between Ste-Croix and Yverdon-les-Bains.
  - Weekends: hourly service between Ste-Croix and Yverdon-les-Bains.
