= Valeyres-sous-Montagny railway station =

Railway station in Valeyres-sous-Montagny, Switzerland

Valeyres-sous-Montagny

General information
- Location: Valeyres-sous-Montagny; Switzerland
- Coordinates: 46°47′49″N 6°36′40″E
- Elevation: 450 m (1,480 ft)
- Owner: Travys
- Line: Yverdon–Ste-Croix line
- Distance: 3.0 km (1.9 mi) from Yverdon-les-Bains
- Platforms: 1 side platform
- Tracks: 1
- Train operators: Travys
- Connections: CarPostal SA buses; travys buses

Construction
- Accessible: Yes

Other information
- Station code: 8504292 (VASM)
- Fare zone: 46 (mobilis)

Services
Preceding station	Travys	Following station
Essert-sous-Champvent towards Ste-Croix	R12	La Brinaz towards Yverdon-les-Bains
Location

Valeyres-sous-Montagny railway station (French: Gare de Valeyres-sous-Montagny) is a railway station in the municipality of Valeyres-sous-Montagny, in the Swiss canton of Vaud. It is an intermediate stop and a request stop on the 1,000 mm (3 ft 3 3/8 in) gauge Yverdon–Ste-Croix line of Travys.

== History ==
Following the December 2024 timetable change, rail services at this station have been limited to shorten travel times along the line and ensure better connections with long-distance trains at Yverdon-les-Bains. Consequently, on weekdays between 5 am and 9 pm, trains no longer stop at this station; instead, a bus service operates to Yverdon-les-Bains.

== Services ==
As of the December 2024 timetable change, the following services stop at Valeyres-sous-Montagny:

- Regio:
  - Weekdays: hourly service in the early mornings and late evenings between Ste-Croix and Yverdon-les-Bains.
  - Weekends: hourly service between Ste-Croix and Yverdon-les-Bains.
