= Baulmes railway station =

Railway station in Baulmes, Switzerland

Baulmes
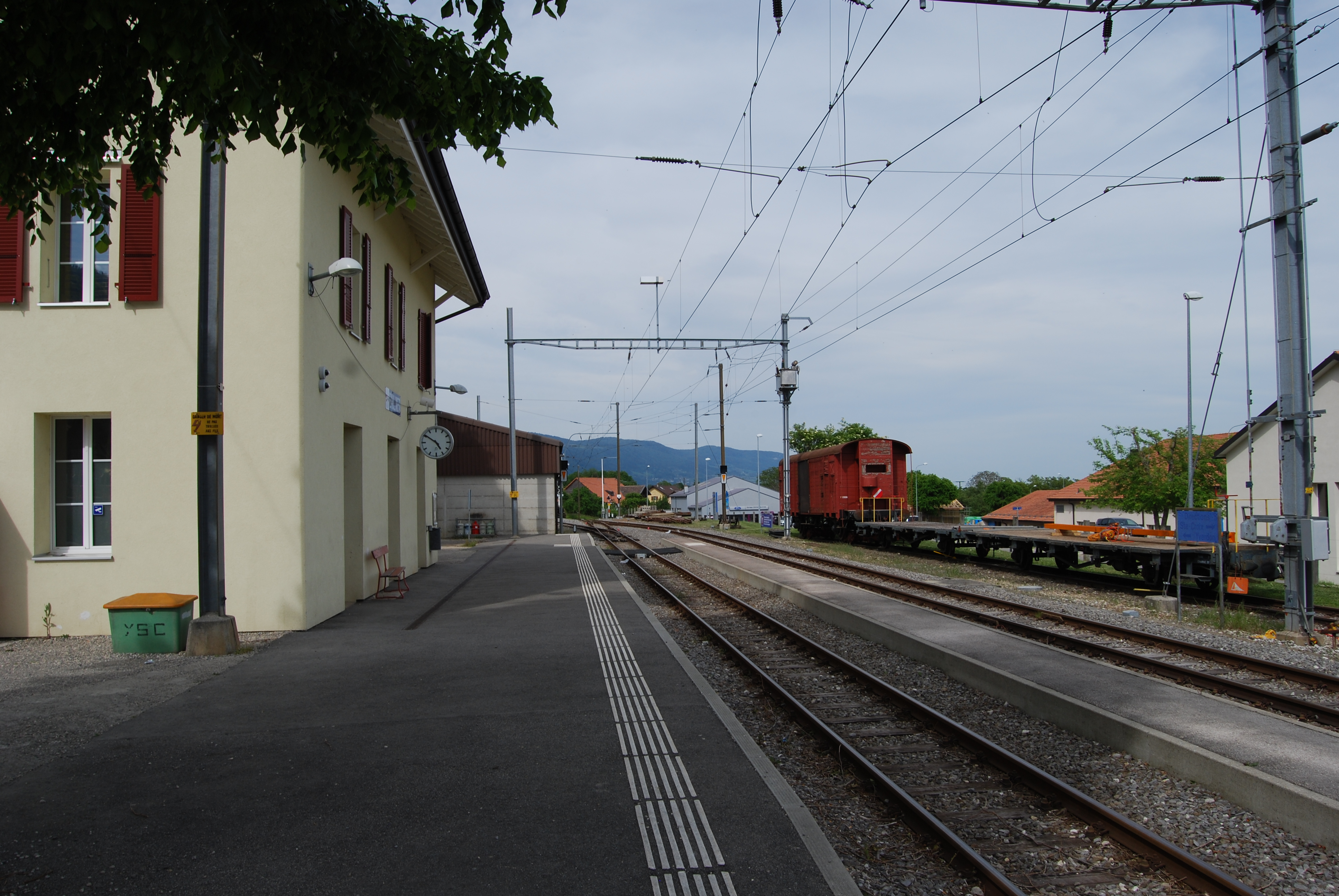
- A train at the station in 2014

General information
- Location: Baulmes; Switzerland
- Coordinates: 46°47′20″N 6°31′26″E
- Elevation: 631 m (2,070 ft)
- Owner: Travys
- Line: Yverdon–Ste-Croix line
- Distance: 11.5 km (7.1 mi) from Yverdon-les-Bains
- Platforms: 2: 1 side platform; 1 island platform
- Tracks: 2
- Train operators: Travys
- Connections: Travys bus line

Construction
- Accessible: Partly

Other information
- Station code: 8504295 (BAU)
- Fare zone: 47 (mobilis)

Services
Preceding station	Travys	Following station
Six-Fontaines towards Ste-Croix	R12	Vuiteboeuf towards Yverdon-les-Bains
Six-Fontaines towards Ste-Croix	R22	Vuiteboeuf towards Yverdon-les-Bains
Location

Baulmes railway station (French: Gare de Baulmes) is a railway station in the municipality of Baulmes, in the Swiss canton of Vaud. It is an intermediate stop on the 1,000 mm (3 ft 3 3/8 in) metre gauge Yverdon–Ste-Croix line of Travys.

== Services ==
As of the December 2024 timetable change, the following services stop at Baulmes:

- Regio: half-hourly or hourly service between Ste-Croix and Yverdon-les-Bains.
