= Essert-sous-Champvent railway station =

Railway station in Champvent, Switzerland

Essert-sous-Champvent
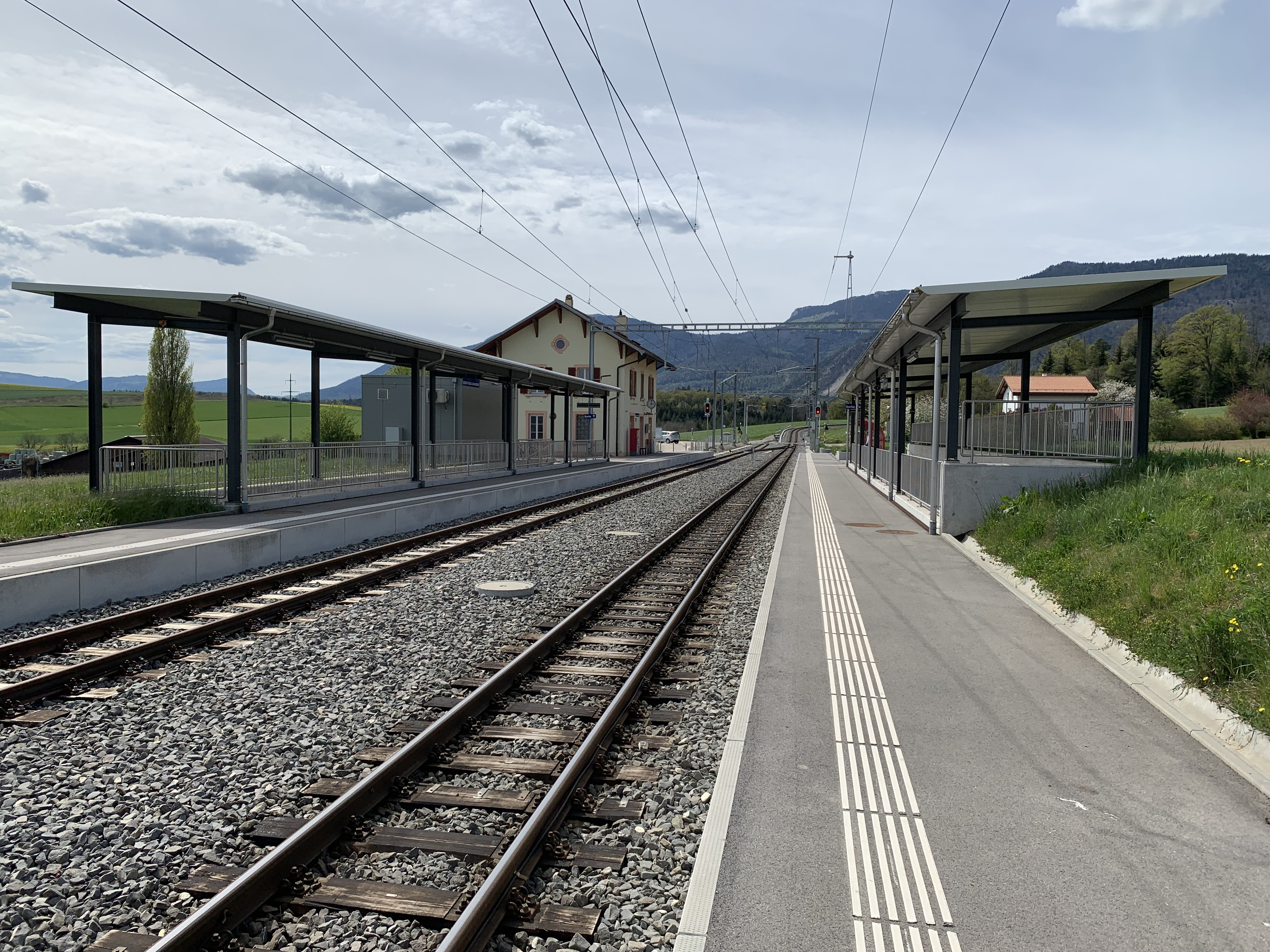
- The station in 2022

General information
- Location: Champvent; Switzerland
- Coordinates: 46°47′42″N 6°34′48″E
- Elevation: 507 m (1,663 ft)
- Owner: Travys
- Line: Yverdon–Ste-Croix line
- Distance: 5.5 km (3.4 mi) from Yverdon-les-Bains
- Platforms: 2 side platforms
- Tracks: 2
- Train operators: Travys
- Connections: travys buses

Construction
- Accessible: Yes

Other information
- Station code: 8504293 (ESSC)
- Fare zone: 46 and 121 (mobilis)

Services
| Preceding station | Travys | Following station |
|---|---|---|
| Vuiteboeuf towards Ste-Croix | R12 | Valeyres-sous-Montagny towards Yverdon-les-Bains |
Location

Essert-sous-Champvent railway station (French: Gare de Essert-sous-Champvent) is a railway station in the municipality of Champvent, in the Swiss canton of Vaud. It is an intermediate stop and a request stop on the 1,000 mm (3 ft 3 3/8 in) gauge Yverdon–Ste-Croix line of Travys.

== History ==
Following the December 2024 timetable change, rail services at this station have been limited to shorten travel times along the line and ensure better connections with long-distance trains at Yverdon-les-Bains. Consequently, on weekdays between 5 am and 9 pm, trains no longer stop at this station; instead, an existing bus service frequency was increased, it operates to Yverdon-les-Bains.

== Services ==
As of the December 2024 timetable change, the following services stop at Essert-sous-Champvent:

- Regio:
  - Weekdays: hourly service in the early mornings and late evenings between Ste-Croix and Yverdon-les-Bains.
  - Weekends: hourly service between Ste-Croix and Yverdon-les-Bains.
