= Six-Fontaines railway station =

Railway station in Baulmes, Switzerland

Six-Fontaines
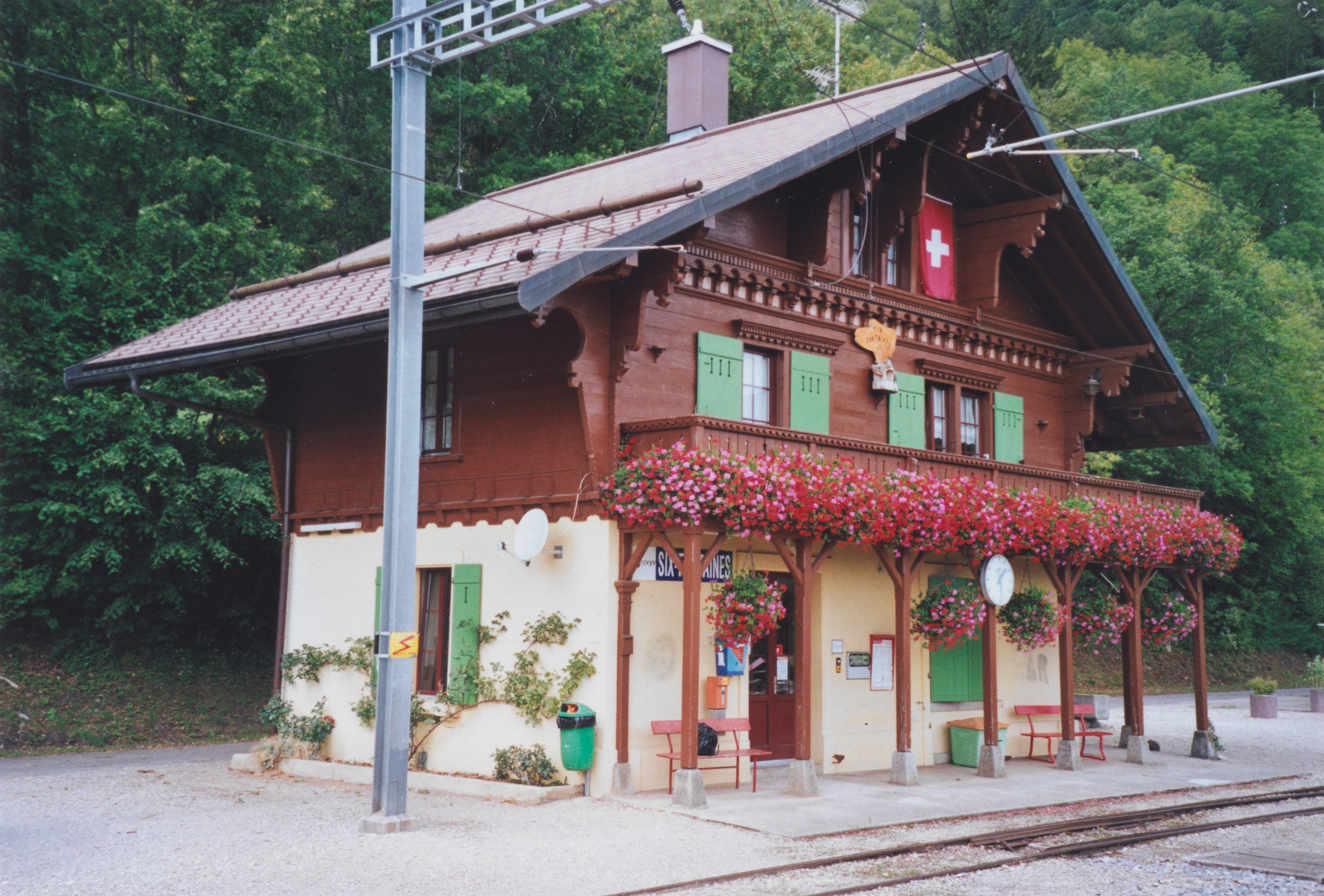
- The station building in 2006

General information
- Location: Baulmes; Switzerland
- Coordinates: 46°46′26″N 6°29′56″E
- Elevation: 705 m (2,313 ft)
- Owner: Travys
- Line: Yverdon–Ste-Croix line
- Distance: 14.4 km (8.9 mi) from Yverdon-les-Bains
- Platforms: 1
- Tracks: 2
- Train operators: Travys

Construction
- Accessible: No

Other information
- Station code: 8504296 (SIXF)
- Fare zone: 114 (mobilis)

Services
Preceding station	Travys	Following station
Ste-Croix Terminus	R12	Baulmes towards Yverdon-les-Bains
Ste-Croix Terminus	R22	Baulmes towards Yverdon-les-Bains
Location

Six-Fontaines railway station (French: Gare de Six-Fontaines) is a railway station in the municipality of Baulmes, in the Swiss canton of Vaud. It is an intermediate stop and a request stop on the 1,000 mm (3 ft 3 3/8 in) gauge Yverdon–Ste-Croix line of Travys.

== Services ==
As of the December 2024 timetable change, the following services stop at Six-Fontaines:

- Regio: half-hourly or hourly service between Ste-Croix and Yverdon-les-Bains.
