= Yverdon William Barbey railway station =

Railway station in Yverdon-les-Bains, Switzerland

Yverdon William Barbey
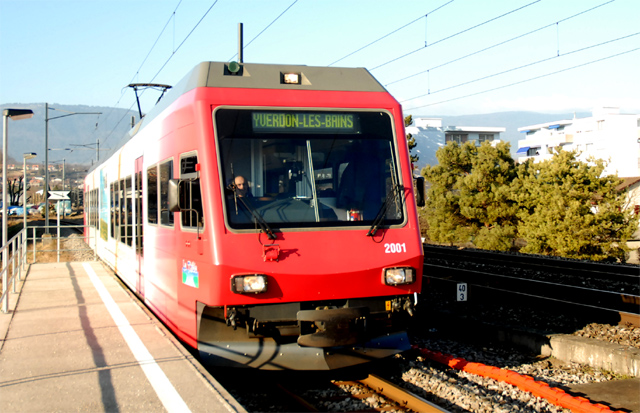
- A train at the station in 2007

General information
- Location: Yverdon-les-Bains; Switzerland
- Coordinates: 46°47′20″N 6°37′55″E
- Elevation: 435 m (1,427 ft)
- Owner: Travys
- Line: Yverdon–Ste-Croix line
- Distance: 1.1 km (0.68 mi) from Yverdon-les-Bains
- Platforms: 1 side platform
- Tracks: 1
- Train operators: Travys
- Connections: Travys buses

Construction
- Accessible: No

Other information
- Station code: 8530263 (YVWB)
- Fare zone: 40 (mobilis)

Services
Preceding station	Travys	Following station
La Brinaz towards Ste-Croix	R12	Yverdon-les-Bains Terminus
Location

Yverdon William Barbey railway station (French: Gare de Yverdon William Barbey) is a railway station in the municipality of Yverdon-les-Bains, in the Swiss canton of Vaud. It is an intermediate stop and a request stop on the 1,000 mm (3 ft 3 3/8 in) gauge Yverdon–Ste-Croix line of Travys.

== History ==
Following the December 2024 timetable change, rail services at this station have been limited to shorten travel times along the line and ensure better connections with long-distance trains at Yverdon-les-Bains. Consequently, on weekdays between 5 am and 9 pm, trains no longer stop at this station; instead, a bus service operates between Yverdon-les-Bains and Valeyres-sous-Montagny.

== Services ==
As of the December 2024 timetable change, the following services stop at Yverdon William Barbey:

- Regio:
  - Weekdays: hourly service in the early mornings and late evenings between Ste-Croix and Yverdon-les-Bains.
  - Weekends: hourly service between Ste-Croix and Yverdon-les-Bains.
