= Les Granges (Orbe) railway station =

Railway station in Orbe, Switzerland

Les Granges (Orbe)
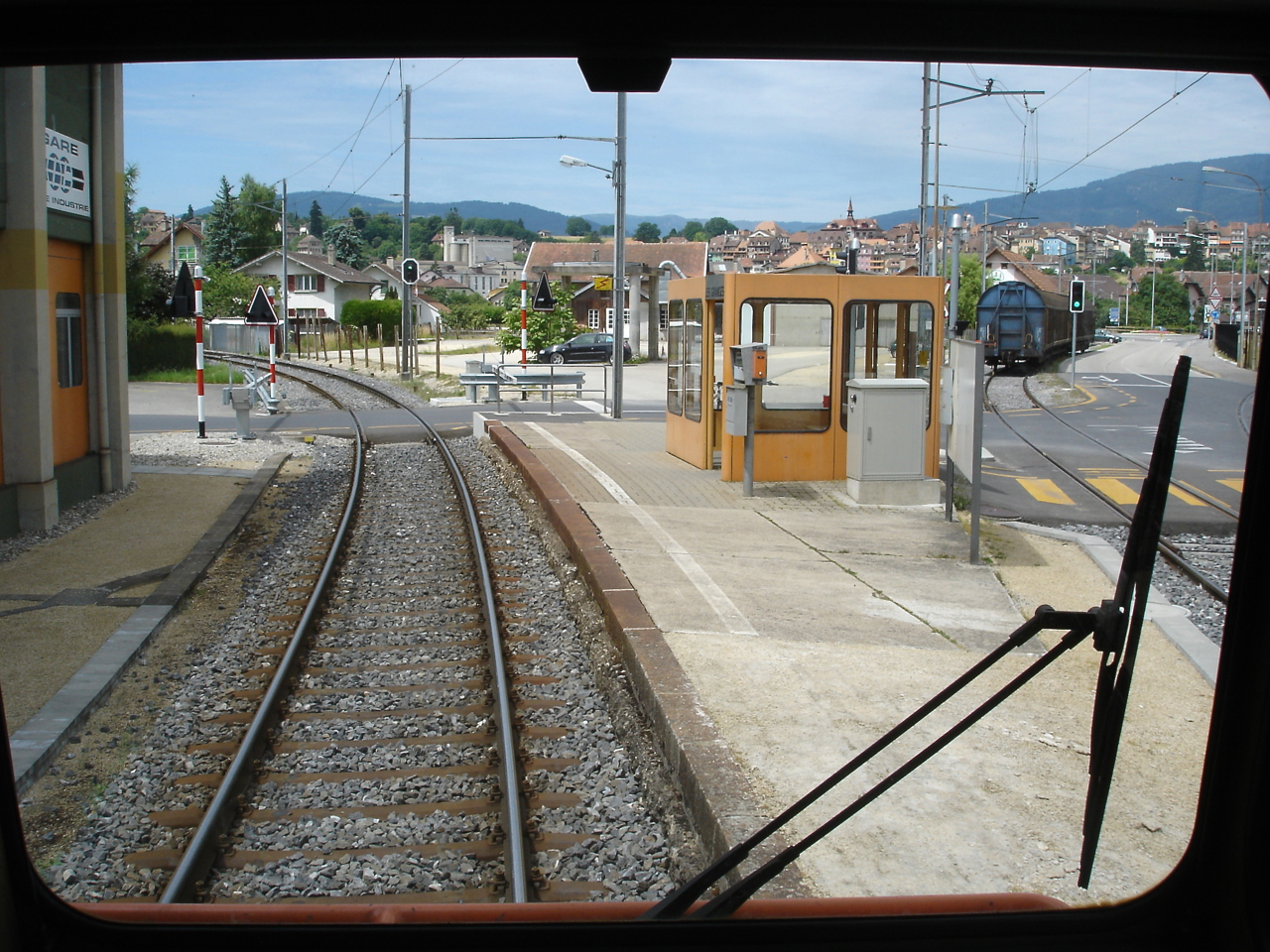
- The station in 2008

General information
- Location: Orbe; Switzerland
- Coordinates: 46°43′N 6°32′E
- Elevation: 445 m (1,460 ft)
- Owner: Travys
- Line: Orbe–Chavornay line
- Distance: 1.5 km (0.93 mi) from Orbe
- Platforms: 1 side platform
- Tracks: 1
- Train operators: Travys
- Connections: Travys buses

Construction
- Accessible: No

Other information
- Station code: 8501194 (GRAN)
- Fare zone: 48 (mobilis)

Services
Preceding station	Travys	Following station
St-Eloi towards Orbe	R11	Chavornay Terminus
Location

Les Granges (Orbe) railway station (French: Gare de Les Granges (Orbe)) is a railway station in the municipality of Orbe, in the Swiss canton of Vaud. It is an intermediate stop and a request stop on the 1,000 mm (3 ft 3 3/8 in) gauge Orbe–Chavornay line of Travys.

== Services ==
As of the December 2024 timetable change, the following services stop at Les Granges (Orbe):

- Regio: hourly or half-hourly service between Orbe and Chavornay.
