= Vuiteboeuf railway station =

Railway station in Vuiteboeuf, Switzerland

Vuiteboeuf
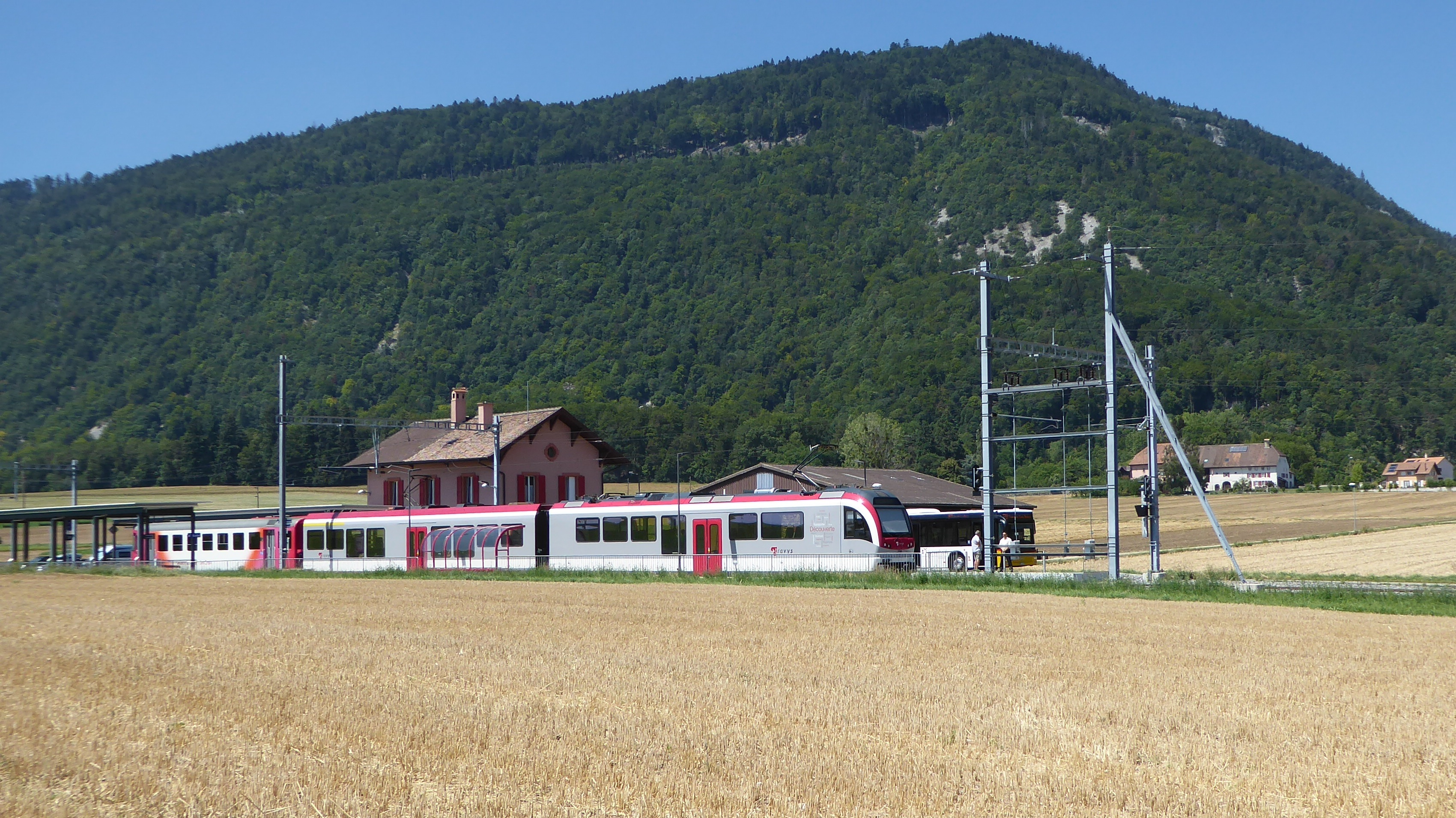
- A train at the station in 2018

General information
- Location: Vuiteboeuf; Switzerland
- Coordinates: 46°48′14″N 6°33′14″E
- Elevation: 589 m (1,932 ft)
- Owner: Travys
- Line: Yverdon–Ste-Croix line
- Distance: 8.5 km (5.3 mi) from Yverdon-les-Bains
- Platforms: 2 side platforms
- Tracks: 2
- Train operators: Travys
- Connections: CarPostal SA bus line

Construction
- Accessible: Yes

Other information
- Station code: 8504294 (VUIB)
- Fare zone: 121 (mobilis)

Services
Preceding station	Travys	Following station
Baulmes towards Ste-Croix	R12	Essert-sous-Champvent towards Yverdon-les-Bains
Baulmes towards Ste-Croix	R22	Yverdon-les-Bains Terminus
Location

Vuiteboeuf railway station (French: Gare de Vuiteboeuf) is a railway station in the municipality of Vuiteboeuf, in the Swiss canton of Vaud. It is an intermediate stop and a request stop on the 1,000 mm (3 ft 3 3/8 in) gauge Yverdon–Ste-Croix line of Travys.

== Services ==
As of the December 2024 timetable change, the following services stop at Vuiteboeuf:

- Regio: half-hourly or hourly service between Ste-Croix and Yverdon-les-Bains.
