= Concise (disambiguation) =

Concise may refer to:

- Concision, conciseness
- Concise, Switzerland; a municipality in Jura-Nord Vaudois, Vaud
  - Concise railway station
- USS Concise (AM-163), a WWII U.S. Navy Admirable-class minesweeper
- Project Concise, a U.S. military project to close extraneous military installations after the U.S.-Vietnam War
- Concise Command Language, the command language for the command line interpreters of several DEC computers
- The Wikipedia style guideline that recommends succinctness in articles

== See also ==
- Succinct (disambiguation)
