= Bevaix railway station =

Railway station in La Grande Béroche, Switzerland

Bevaix
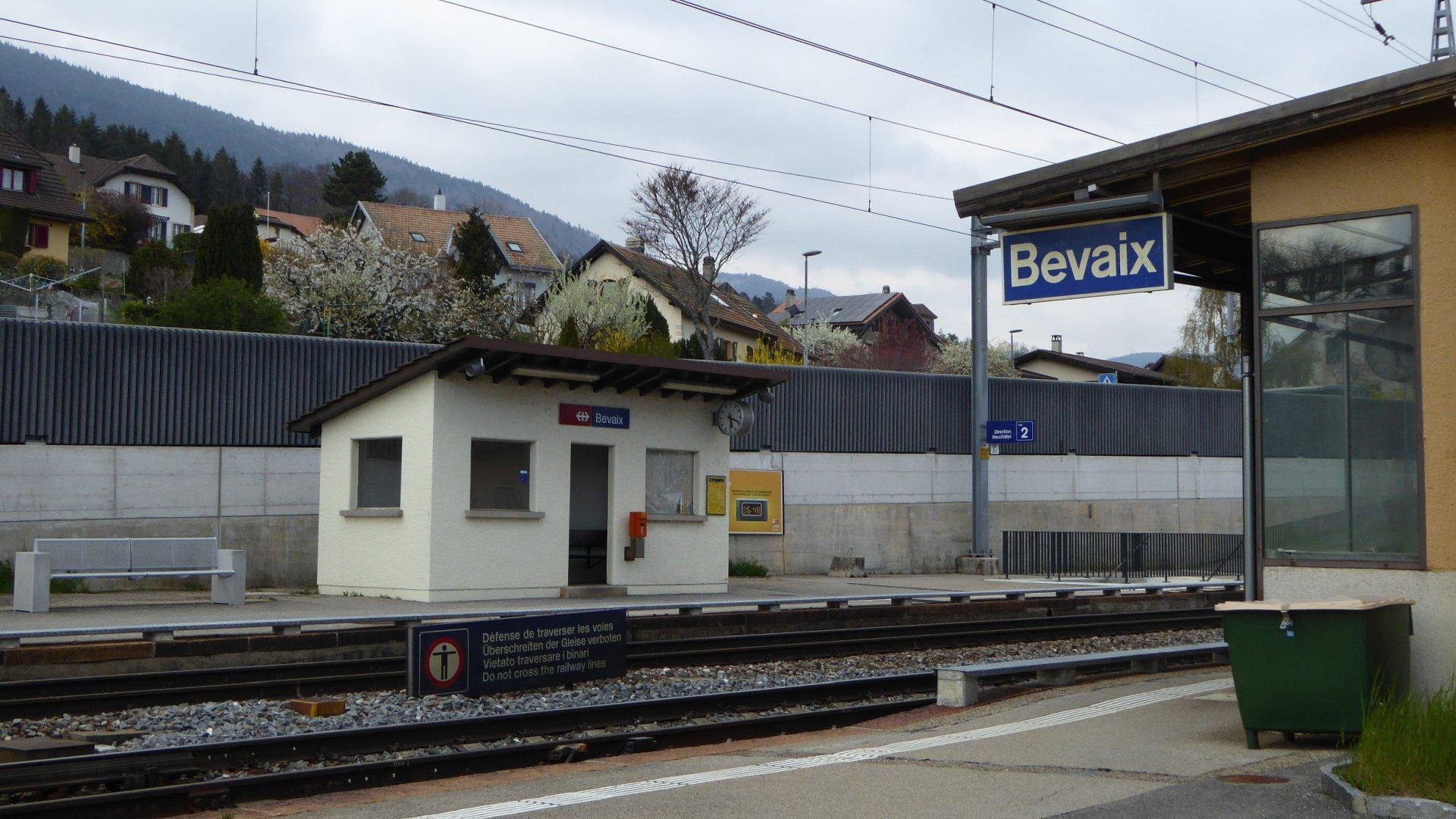
- The station platforms in 2018

General information
- Location: La Grande Béroche; Switzerland
- Coordinates: 46°55′47″N 6°48′42″E
- Elevation: 489 m (1,604 ft)
- Owner: Swiss Federal Railways
- Line: Jura Foot line
- Distance: 62.3 km (38.7 mi) from Lausanne
- Platforms: 2 side platforms
- Tracks: 2
- Train operators: Swiss Federal Railways

Construction
- Parking: Yes (10 spaces)
- Cycle facilities: Yes (10 spaces
- Accessible: No

Other information
- Station code: 8504206 (BV)
- Fare zone: 11 (Onde Verte)

Passengers
- 2023: 600 per weekday (SBB)

Services
Preceding station	SBB CFF FFS	Following station
Gorgier-St-Aubin towards Yverdon-les-Bains	R13	Boudry towards Biel/Bienne
Location
- Location within Switzerland Location within Canton of Neuchâtel

Bevaix railway station (French: Gare de Bevaix) is a railway station in the municipality of La Grande Béroche, in the Swiss canton of Neuchâtel. It is an intermediate stop on the standard gauge Jura Foot line of Swiss Federal Railways.

== Services ==
As of the December 2024 timetable change, the following services stop at Bevaix:

- Regio: hourly service between Biel/Bienne and Yverdon-les-Bains.
