= Gorgier-St-Aubin railway station =

Railway station in La Grande Béroche, Switzerland

Gorgier-St-Aubin
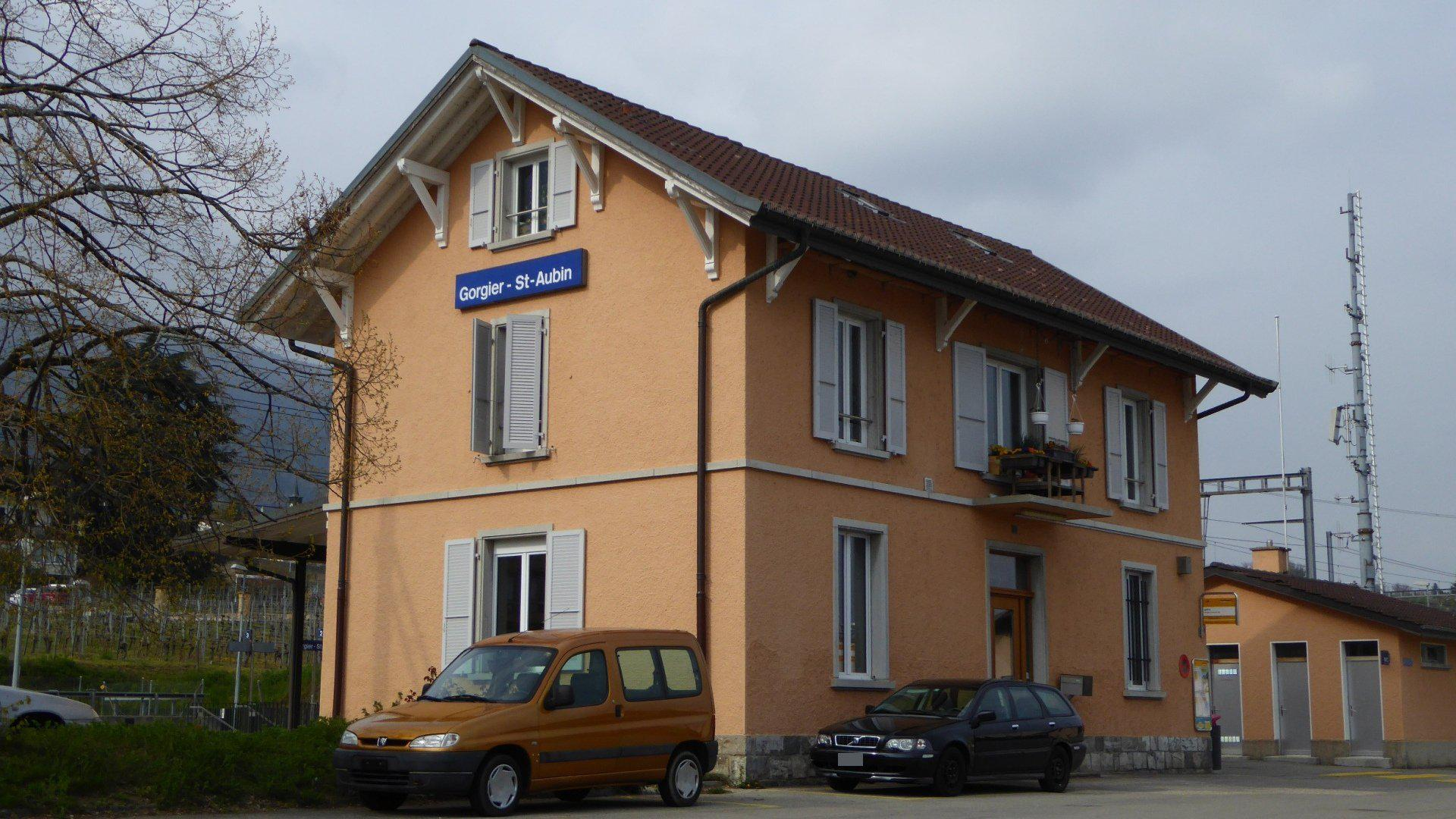
- The station building in 2018

General information
- Location: La Grande Béroche; Switzerland
- Coordinates: 46°53′57″N 6°46′52″E
- Elevation: 451 m (1,480 ft)
- Owner: Swiss Federal Railways
- Line: Jura Foot line
- Distance: 58.1 km (36.1 mi) from Lausanne
- Platforms: 3; 1 island platform; 1 side platform
- Train operators: Swiss Federal Railways
- Connections: CarPostal SA bus lines

Construction
- Parking: Yes (28 spaces)
- Cycle facilities: Yes (20 spaces)
- Accessible: Platform 1 only

Other information
- Station code: 8504205 (GOR)
- Fare zone: 15 (Onde Verte); 126 (mobilis)

Passengers
- 2023: 770 per weekday (SBB)

Services
Preceding station	SBB CFF FFS	Following station
Concise towards Yverdon-les-Bains	R13	Bevaix towards Biel/Bienne
Location
- Location within Switzerland Location within Canton of Neuchâtel

Gorgier-St-Aubin railway station (French: Gare de Gorgier-St-Aubin) is a railway station in the municipality of La Grande Béroche, in the Swiss canton of Neuchâtel. It is an intermediate stop on the standard gauge Jura Foot line of Swiss Federal Railways.

== Services ==
As of the December 2024 timetable change, the following services stop at Gorgier-St-Aubin:

- Regio: hourly service between Biel/Bienne and Yverdon-les-Bains.
