= Boudry railway station =

Railway station in Boudry, Switzerland

Boudry
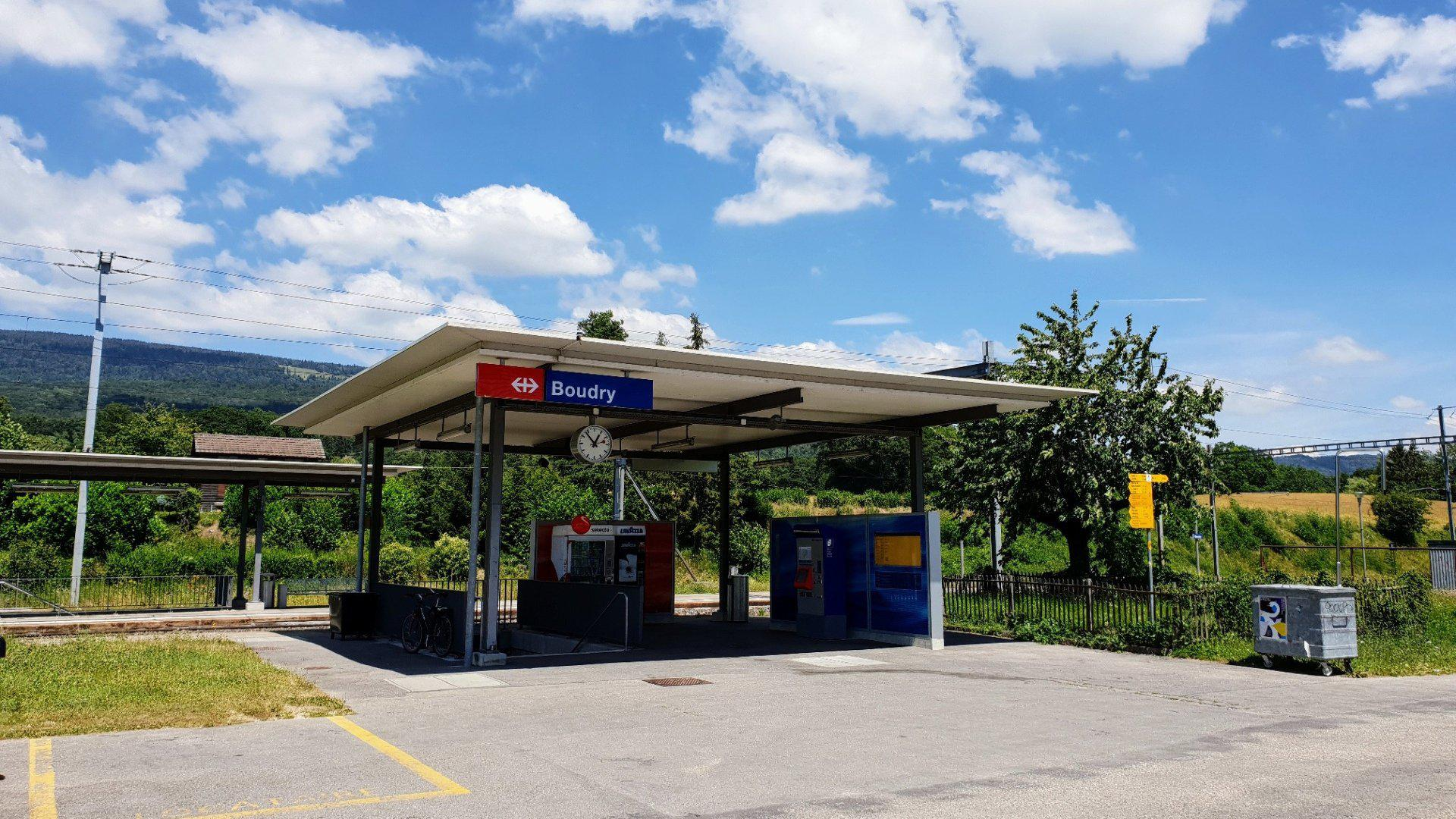
- The station platform in 2018

General information
- Location: Boudry; Switzerland
- Coordinates: 46°57′34″N 6°50′06″E
- Elevation: 491 m (1,611 ft)
- Owner: Swiss Federal Railways
- Line: Jura Foot line
- Distance: 66.3 km (41.2 mi) from Lausanne
- Platforms: 2 (1 island platform)
- Tracks: 3
- Train operators: Swiss Federal Railways
- Connections: CarPostal SA bus line

Construction
- Parking: Yes (21 spaces)
- Accessible: No

Other information
- Station code: 8504208 (BDR)
- Fare zone: 11 (Onde Verte)

Passengers
- 2023: 470 per weekday (SBB)

Services
Preceding station	SBB CFF FFS	Following station
Bevaix towards Yverdon-les-Bains	R13	Colombier NE towards Biel/Bienne
Location
- Location within Switzerland Location within Canton of Neuchâtel

Boudry railway station (French: Gare de Boudry) is a railway station in the municipality of Boudry, in the Swiss canton of Neuchâtel. It is an intermediate stop on the standard gauge Jura Foot line of Swiss Federal Railways.

== Services ==
As of the December 2024 timetable change, the following services stop at Boudry:

- Regio: hourly service between Biel/Bienne and Yverdon-les-Bains.
