= Colombier NE railway station =

Railway station in Milvignes, Switzerland

Colombier NE
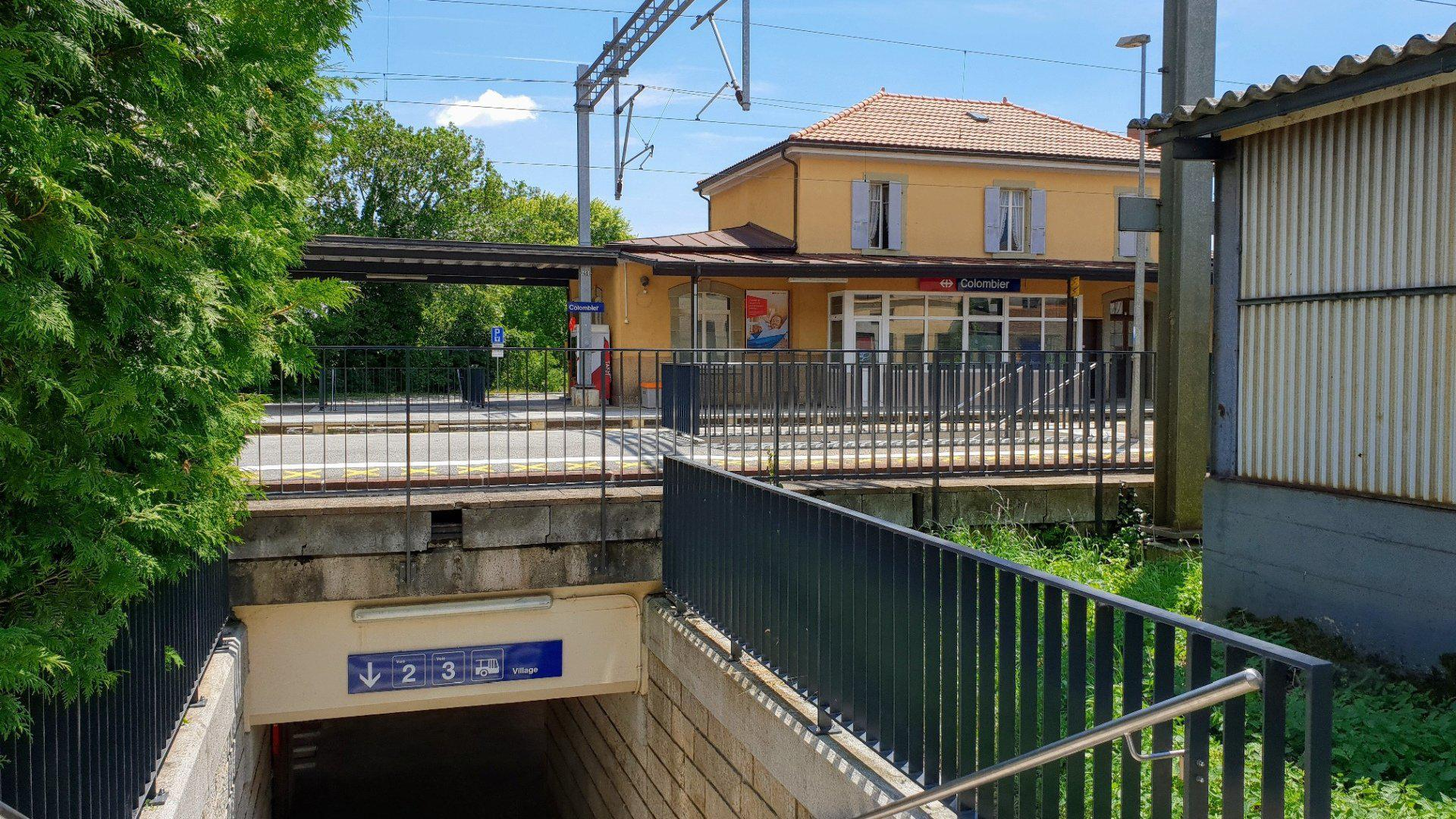
- The station in 2018

General information
- Location: Milvignes; Switzerland
- Coordinates: 46°58′03″N 6°50′56″E
- Elevation: 489 m (1,604 ft)
- Owner: Swiss Federal Railways
- Line: Jura Foot line
- Distance: 67.7 km (42.1 mi) from Lausanne
- Platforms: 3; 1 side platform; 1 island platform
- Tracks: 3
- Train operators: Swiss Federal Railways
- Connections: TransN bus line

Construction
- Parking: Yes (8 spaces)
- Cycle facilities: Yes (19 spaces)
- Accessible: No

Other information
- Station code: 8504209 (CLB)
- Fare zone: 10 (Onde Verte)

Passengers
- 2023: 420 per weekday (SBB, transN)

Services
Preceding station	SBB CFF FFS	Following station
Boudry towards Yverdon-les-Bains	R13	Auvernier towards Biel/Bienne
Location
- Location within Switzerland Location within Canton of Neuchâtel

Colombier NE railway station (French: Gare de Colombier NE) is a railway station in the municipality of Milvignes, in the Swiss canton of Neuchâtel. It is an intermediate stop on the standard gauge Jura Foot line of Swiss Federal Railways.

== History ==
Le 22 of march 1871, a trash between two trains inside the station. A train with a thousand passengers collides with a freight train on a siding. Twenty-four French soldiers die and sixty are injured.

== Services ==
As of the December 2024 timetable change, the following services stop at Colombier NE:

- Regio: hourly service between Biel/Bienne and Yverdon-les-Bains.
