= Auvernier railway station =

Railway station in Milvignes, Switzerland

Auvernier
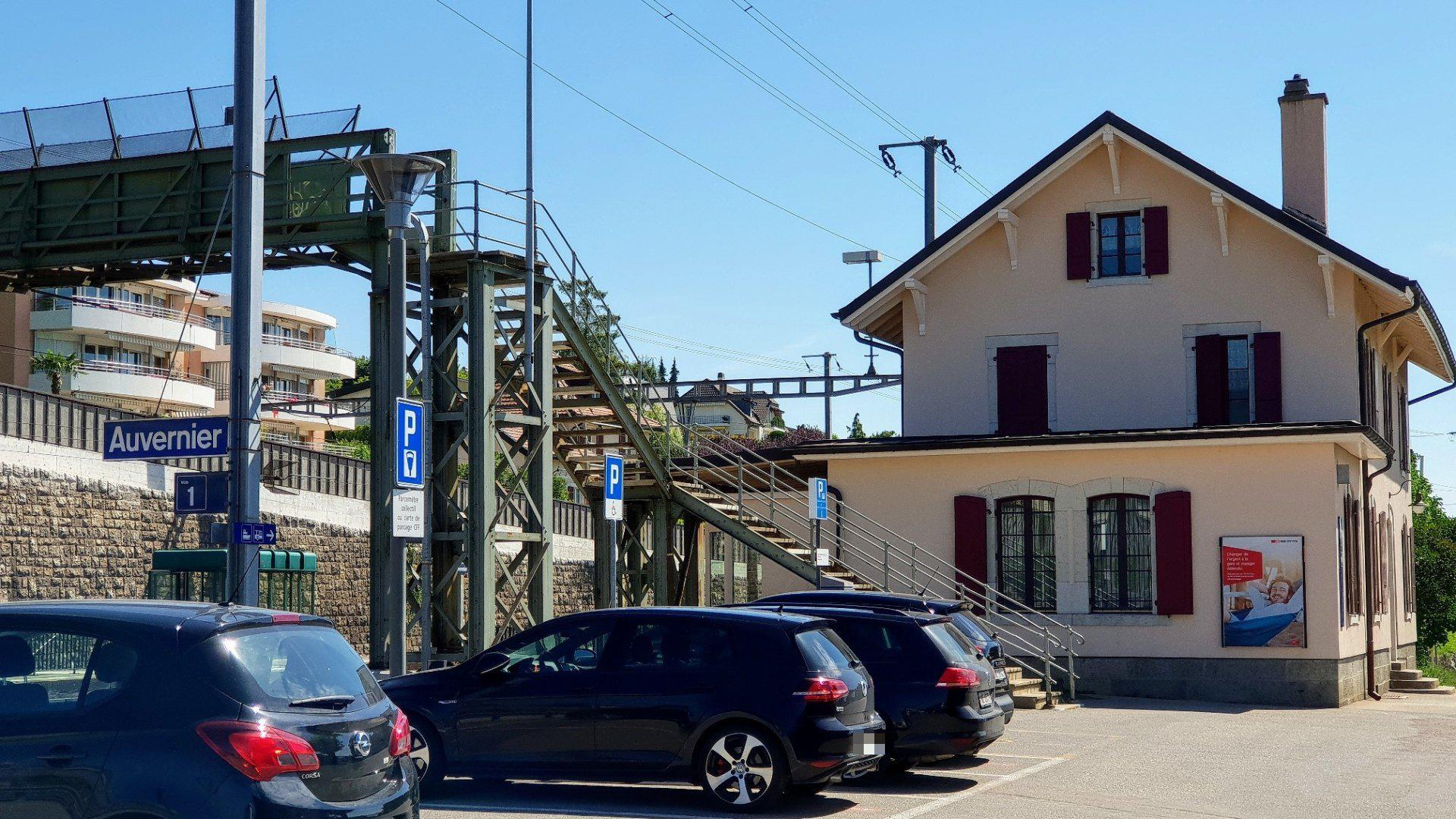
- The station building in 2018

General information
- Location: Milvignes; Switzerland
- Coordinates: 46°58′47″N 6°52′40″E
- Elevation: 492 m (1,614 ft)
- Owner: Swiss Federal Railways
- Lines: Jura Foot line; Neuchâtel–Pontarlier line
- Distance: 70.3 km (43.7 mi) from Lausanne
- Platforms: 3; 1 Island platform; 1 side platform
- Tracks: 3
- Train operators: Swiss Federal Railways; Transports publics Neuchâtelois
- Connections: TransN bus line

Construction
- Parking: Yes (37 spaces)
- Cycle facilities: Yes (16 spaces)
- Accessible: No

Other information
- Station code: 8504219 (AUV)
- Fare zone: 10 (Onde Verte)

Passengers
- 2023: 610 per weekday (SBB, transN)

Services
Preceding station	SBB CFF FFS	Following station
Colombier NE towards Yverdon-les-Bains	R13	Neuchâtel-Serrières towards Biel/Bienne
Preceding station	Transports publics Neuchâtelois	Following station
Bôle towards Buttes	R21	Neuchâtel-Serrières towards Neuchâtel
Location
- Location within Switzerland Location within Canton of Neuchâtel

Auvernier railway station (French: Gare de Auvernier) is a railway station in the municipality of Milvignes, in the Swiss canton of Neuchâtel. It is located at the junction of the standard gauge Jura Foot and Neuchâtel–Pontarlier lines of Swiss Federal Railways.

== Services ==
As of the December 2024 timetable change, the following services stop at Auvernier:

- Regio:
  - half-hourly service between Neuchâtel and Buttes.
  - hourly service between Biel/Bienne and Yverdon-les-Bains.
