= Neuchâtel-Serrières railway station =

Railway station in Neuchâtel, Switzerland

Neuchâtel-Serrières
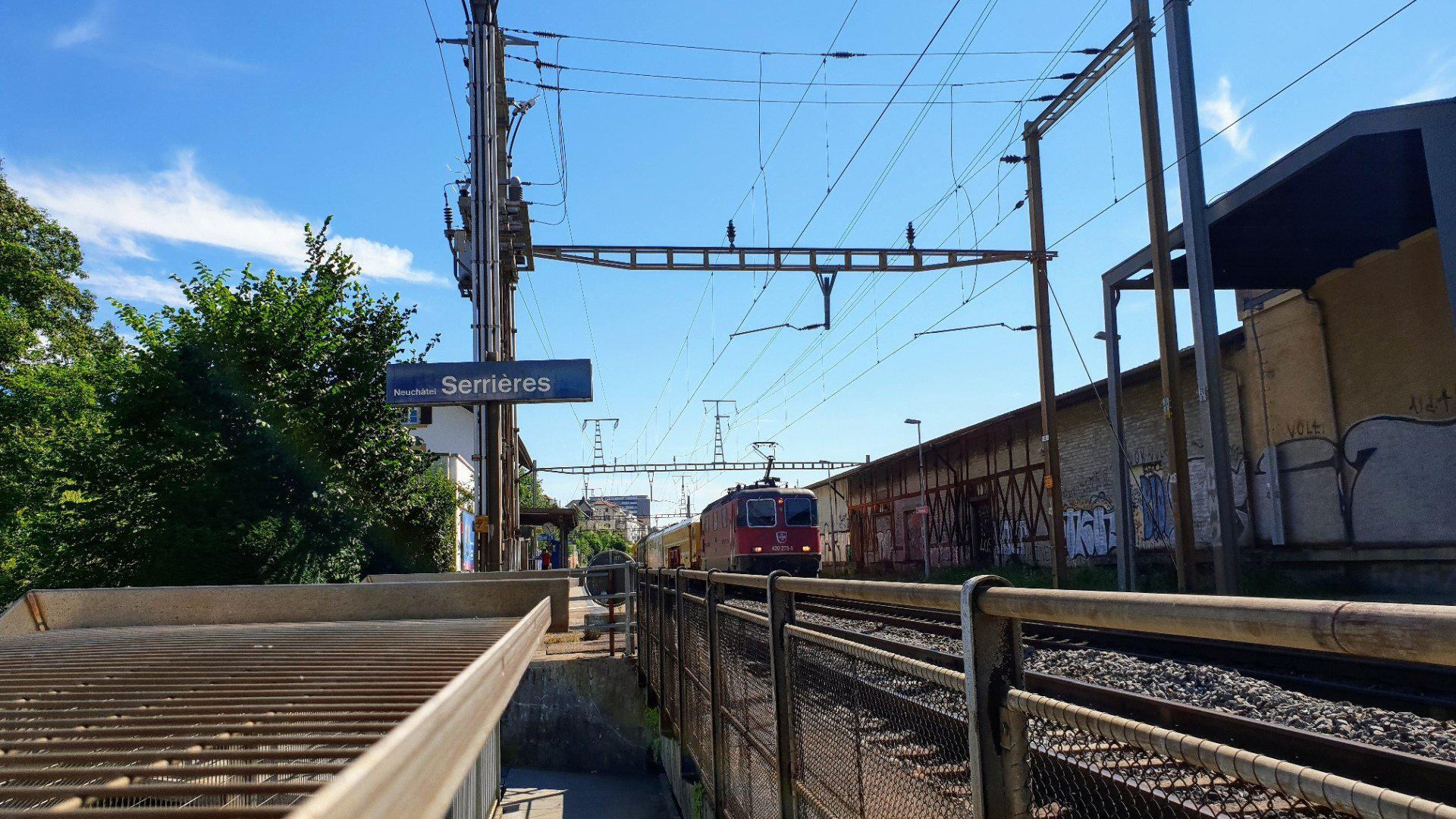
- An SBB train passes the station platform in 2018

General information
- Location: Neuchâtel; Switzerland
- Coordinates: 46°59′02″N 6°54′12″E
- Elevation: 475 m (1,558 ft)
- Owner: Swiss Federal Railways
- Lines: Jura Foot line; Neuchâtel–Pontarlier line
- Distance: 72.4 km (45.0 mi) from Lausanne
- Platforms: 2 side platforms
- Tracks: 2
- Train operators: Swiss Federal Railways; Transports publics Neuchâtelois

Construction
- Parking: Yes (22 spaces)
- Cycle facilities: 8
- Accessible: No

Other information
- Station code: 8504220 (NESE)
- Fare zone: 10 (Onde Verte)

Passengers
- 2023: 910 per weekday (SBB, transN)

Services
Preceding station	SBB CFF FFS	Following station
Auvernier towards Yverdon-les-Bains	R13	Neuchâtel towards Biel/Bienne
Preceding station	Transports publics Neuchâtelois	Following station
Auvernier towards Buttes	R21	Neuchâtel Terminus
Location
- Location within Switzerland Location within Canton of Neuchâtel

Neuchâtel-Serrières railway station (French: Gare de Neuchâtel-Serrières) is a railway station in the municipality of Neuchâtel, in the Swiss canton of Neuchâtel. It is an intermediate stop on the standard gauge Jura Foot and Neuchâtel–Pontarlier lines of Swiss Federal Railways.

Funiculaire Suchard in Serrières linked the station with the factory in the Serrières valley below (1892-1955).

== Services ==
As of the December 2024 timetable change, the following services stop at Neuchâtel-Serrières:

- Regio:
  - half-hourly service between Neuchâtel and Buttes.
  - hourly service between Biel/Bienne and Yverdon-les-Bains.
