= Chavornay, Switzerland =

Chavornay
- Municipality
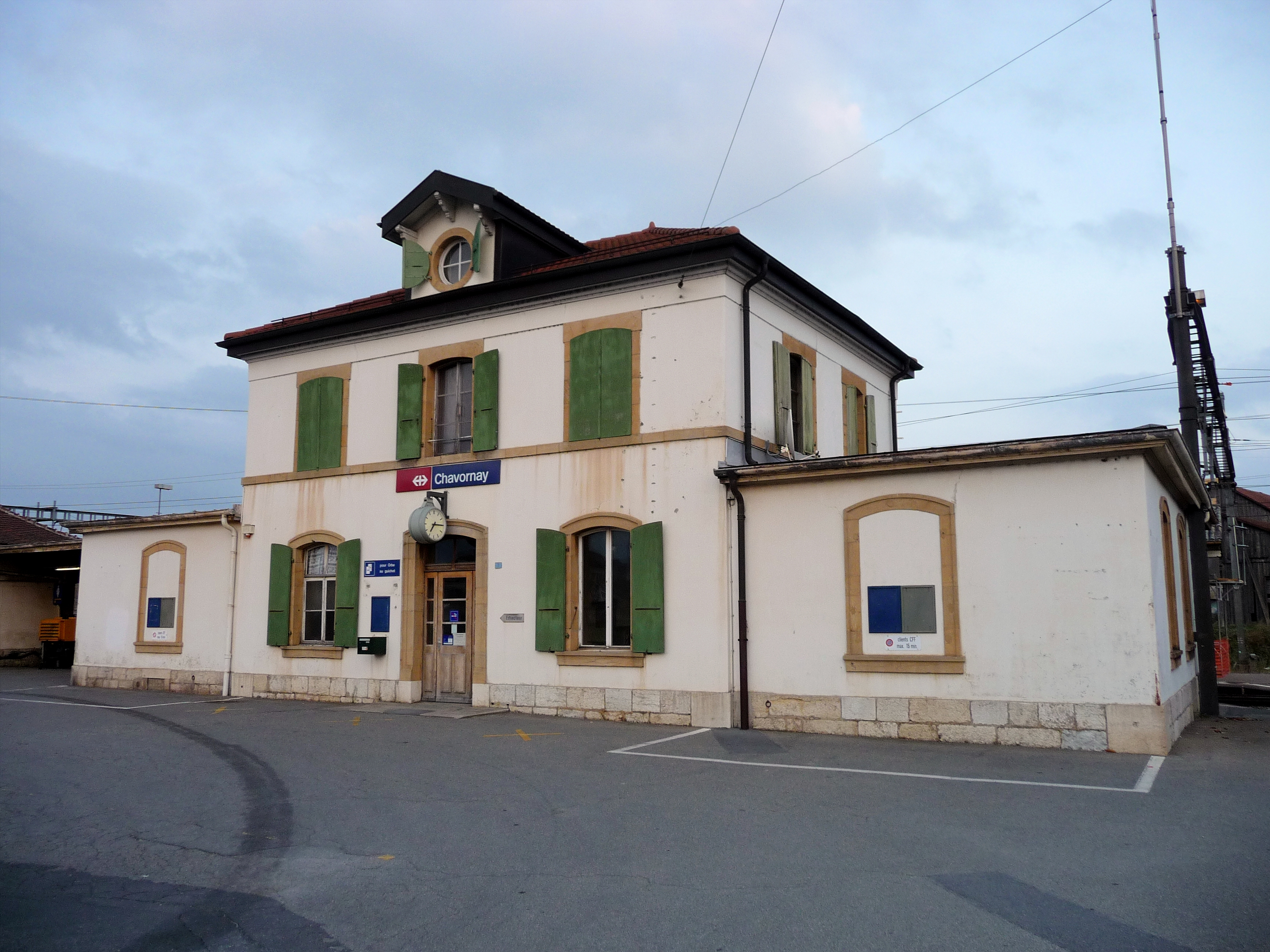
- Chavornay train station

- Flag Coat of arms
- Location of Chavornay
- Location within Switzerland Location within Canton of Vaud
- Coordinates: 46°42′N 06°34′E
- Country: Switzerland
- Canton: Vaud
- District: Jura-Nord Vaudois

Government
  - Mayor: Syndic

Area
  - Total: 11.07 km^{2} (4.27 sq mi)
- Elevation: 452 m (1,483 ft)

Population (2003)
  - Total: 2,834
  - Density: 256.0/km^{2} (663.1/sq mi)
- Time zone: UTC+01:00 (CET)
  - Summer (DST): UTC+02:00 (CEST)
- Postal code: 1373
- SFOS number: 5749
- ISO 3166 code: CH-VD
- Surrounded by: Arnex-sur-Orbe, Bavois, Corcelles-sur-Chavornay, Essert-Pittet, Orbe, Penthéréaz, Suchy
- Website: www.chavornay.ch

Chavornay (French pronunciation: [ʃavɔʁnɛ]) is a municipality in the district of Jura-Nord Vaudois in the canton of Vaud in Switzerland. In 2017 the former municipalities of Essert-Pittet and Corcelles-sur-Chavornay merged into the municipality of Chavornay.

== History ==
Chavornay is first mentioned in 927 as Cavorniacum. In 1228 it was mentioned as Chavornai.

== Geography ==
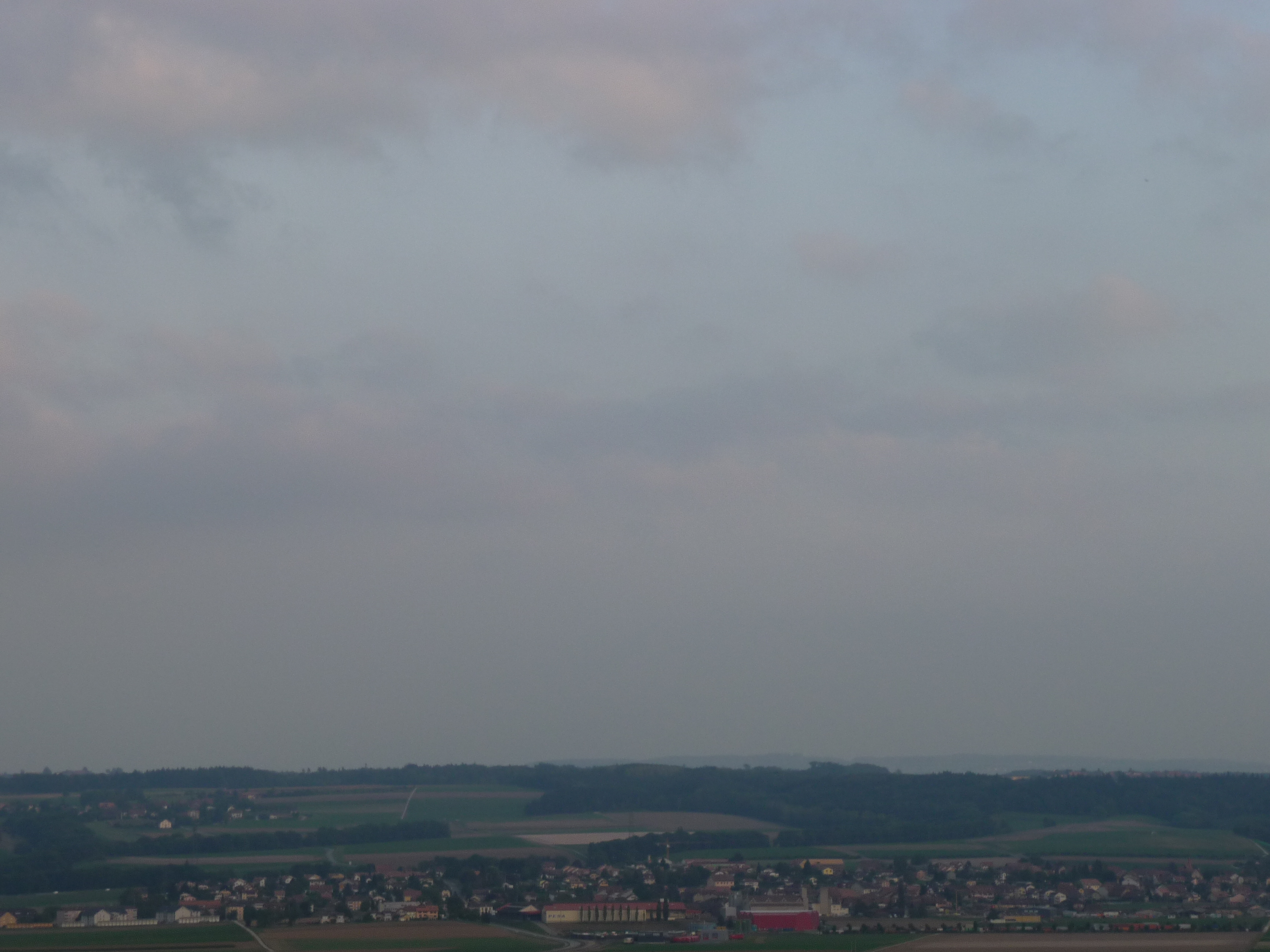
Chavornay and surroundings

After the 2017 merger Chavornay had an area of 19.28 km^{2} (7.44 sq mi). Before the merger Chavornay had an area, (as of the 2004/09 survey) of 11.07 square kilometers (4.27 sq mi). Of this area, about 65.7% is used for agricultural purposes, while 15.6% is forested. Of the rest of the land, 14.8% is settled (buildings or roads) and 3.9% is unproductive land. In the 2013/18 survey a total of 105 ha (260 acres) or about 9.5% of the total area was covered with buildings, an increase of 49 ha (120 acres) over the 1980 amount. Over the same time period, the amount of recreational space in the municipality increased by 2 ha (4.9 acres) and is now about 0.63% of the total area. Of the agricultural land, 10 ha (25 acres) is used for orchards and vineyards, 706 ha (1,740 acres) is fields and grasslands and 0 ha (0 acres) consists of alpine grazing areas. Since 1980 the amount of agricultural land has decreased by 54 ha (130 acres). Over the same time period the amount of forested land has increased by 1 ha (2.5 acres). Rivers and lakes cover 36 ha (89 acres) in the municipality.

The municipality was part of the Orbe District until it was dissolved on 31 August 2006, and Chavornay became part of the new district of Jura-Nord Vaudois.

The municipality is located on the eastern edge of the Orbe valley, on the right side of the Talent river.

== Coat of arms ==
The blazon of the municipal coat of arms is Per pale Argent and Gules, overall a Crown Or ornamented Vert and Azure.

== Demographics ==
Chavornay has a population (as of December 2020) of 5,229. As of 2008, 21.9% of the population are resident foreign nationals. Over the last 10 years (1999–2009 ) the population has changed at a rate of 28.5%. It has changed at a rate of 21% due to migration and at a rate of 8.2% due to births and deaths.

Most of the population (as of 2000) speaks French (2,468 or 88.6%), with German being second most common (104 or 3.7%) and Portuguese being third (62 or 2.2%). There are 40 people who speak Italian.

The age distribution, as of 2009, in Chavornay is; 473 children or 13.6% of the population are between 0 and 9 years old and 468 teenagers or 13.4% are between 10 and 19. Of the adult population, 504 people or 14.4% of the population are between 20 and 29 years old. 525 people or 15.1% are between 30 and 39, 597 people or 17.1% are between 40 and 49, and 406 people or 11.6% are between 50 and 59. The senior population distribution is 283 people or 8.1% of the population are between 60 and 69 years old, 139 people or 4.0% are between 70 and 79, there are 77 people or 2.2% who are between 80 and 89, and there are 16 people or 0.5% who are 90 and older.

As of 2000, there were 1,194 people who were single and never married in the municipality. There were 1,294 married individuals, 138 widows or widowers and 159 individuals who are divorced.

As of 2000, there were 1,159 private households in the municipality, and an average of 2.4 persons per household. There were 388 households that consist of only one person and 91 households with five or more people. Out of a total of 1,181 households that answered this question, 32.9% were households made up of just one person and there were 7 adults who lived with their parents. Of the rest of the households, there are 300 married couples without children, 383 married couples with children There were 66 single parents with a child or children. There were 15 households that were made up of unrelated people and 22 households that were made up of some sort of institution or another collective housing.

In 2000 there were 307 single family homes (or 57.2% of the total) out of a total of 537 inhabited buildings. There were 103 multi-family buildings (19.2%), along with 92 multi-purpose buildings that were mostly used for housing (17.1%) and 35 other use buildings (commercial or industrial) that also had some housing (6.5%).

In 2000, a total of 1,143 apartments (89.0% of the total) were permanently occupied, while 92 apartments (7.2%) were seasonally occupied and 49 apartments (3.8%) were empty. As of 2009, the construction rate of new housing units was 5.4 new units per 1000 residents. The vacancy rate for the municipality, in 2010, was 1.11%.

The historical population is given in the following chart:

== Heritage sites of national significance ==
The Swiss Reformed Church of Saint-Maurice is listed as a Swiss heritage site of national significance.

== Politics ==
In the 2015 federal election the most popular party was the SVP with 28.2% of the vote. The next three most popular parties were the FDP (25.9%), the SP (20.1%) and the GPS (9.3%). In the federal election, a total of 876 votes were cast, and the voter turnout was 37.3%. The 2015 election saw a large change in the voting when compared to 2011. The percentage of the vote received by the FDP increased from 17.2% in 2011 to 25.9% in 2015.

In the 2007 federal election the most popular party was the SVP which received 23.66% of the vote. The next three most popular parties were the SP (21.07%), the FDP (17.78%) and the LPS Party (10.86%). In the federal election, a total of 720 votes were cast, and the voter turnout was 36.4%.

== Economy ==
Chavornay is a bedroom community with many new residents. The municipality is part of the agglomeration of Lausanne.

As of 2014, there were a total of 1,498 people employed in the municipality. Of these, 86 people worked in 19 businesses in the primary economic sector. A majority (51.2%) of the primary sector employees worked in very small businesses (less than ten employees). The remainder worked in 2 small businesses with a total of 42 employees. The secondary sector employed 866 workers in 37 separate businesses. In 2014, 180 employees worked in 36 small companies (less than 50 employees). There was also one large business which employed 686 people. Finally, the tertiary sector provided 546 jobs in 151 businesses. In 2014 a total of 9.8% of the population received social assistance.

In 2008 the total number of full-time equivalent jobs was 851. The number of jobs in the primary sector was 79, of which 74 were in agriculture and 5 were in fishing or fisheries. The number of jobs in the secondary sector was 292 of which 228 or (78.1%) were in manufacturing and 52 (17.8%) were in construction. The number of jobs in the tertiary sector was 480. In the tertiary sector; 146 or 30.4% were in wholesale or retail sales or the repair of motor vehicles, 191 or 39.8% were in the movement and storage of goods, 25 or 5.2% were in a hotel or restaurant, 3 or 0.6% were in the information industry, 5 or 1.0% were the insurance or financial industry, 24 or 5.0% were technical professionals or scientists, 10 or 2.1% were in education and 11 or 2.3% were in health care.

In 2000, there were 528 workers who commuted into the municipality and 1,038 workers who commuted away. The municipality is a net exporter of workers, with about 2.0 workers leaving the municipality for every one entering. About 9.1% of the workforce coming into Chavornay are coming from outside Switzerland. Of the working population, 13.8% used public transportation to get to work, and 68.3% used a private car.

Chavornay station is served by the Swiss Federal Railways and the Orbe-Chavornay railway (the first electrified railway line in Switzerland).

== Religion ==
From the 2000 census, 682 or 24.5% were Roman Catholic, while 1,394 or 50.1% belonged to the Swiss Reformed Church. Of the rest of the population, there were 42 members of an Orthodox church (or about 1.51% of the population), and there were 140 individuals (or about 5.03% of the population) who belonged to another Christian church. There was 1 individual who was Jewish, and 101 (or about 3.63% of the population) who were Islamic. There were 7 individuals who were Buddhist, 4 individuals who were Hindu and 6 individuals who belonged to another church. 357 (or about 12.82% of the population) belonged to no church, are agnostic or atheist, and 118 individuals (or about 4.24% of the population) did not answer the question.

== Weather ==
Chavornay has an average of 116.5 days of rain or snow per year and on average receives 847 mm (33.3 in) of precipitation. The wettest month is June during which time Chavornay receives an average of 92 mm (3.6 in) of rain or snow. During this month there is precipitation for an average of 10.7 days. The month with the most days of precipitation is May, with an average of 11.8, but with only 77 mm (3.0 in) of rain or snow. The driest month of the year is April with an average of 58 mm (2.3 in) of precipitation over 9.3 days.

== Education ==
In Chavornay about 1,043 or (37.5%) of the population have completed non-mandatory upper secondary education, and 281 or (10.1%) have completed additional higher education (either university or a Fachhochschule). Of the 281 who completed tertiary schooling, 53.7% were Swiss men, 23.8% were Swiss women, 14.6% were non-Swiss men and 7.8% were non-Swiss women.

In the 2009/2010 school year there were a total of 515 students in the Chavornay school district. In the Vaud cantonal school system, two years of non-obligatory pre-school are provided by the political districts. During the school year, the political district provided pre-school care for a total of 578 children of which 359 children (62.1%) received subsidized pre-school care. The canton's primary school program requires students to attend for four years. There were 282 students in the municipal primary school program. The obligatory lower secondary school program lasts for six years and there were 229 students in those schools. There were also 4 students who were home schooled or attended another non-traditional school.

As of 2000, there were 62 students in Chavornay who came from another municipality, while 228 residents attended schools outside the municipality.

== Transportation ==
The municipality has two railway stations, Chavornay and Essert-Pittet, on the Jura Foot and Orbe–Chavornay lines. It has regular service to Grandson, Yverdon-les-Bains, Aigle, Orbe, and Lausanne.

== Crime ==
In 2014 the crime rate, of the over 200 crimes listed in the Swiss Criminal Code (running from murder, robbery and assault to accepting bribes and election fraud), in Chavornay was 77.6 per thousand residents, slightly higher than the national average (64.6 per thousand). During the same period, the rate of drug crimes was 9.8 per thousand residents, almost exactly the same as the national rate (9.9). The rate of violations of immigration, visa and work permit laws was 7.8 per thousand residents, which is 59.2% greater than the national rate.
