= Essert-Pittet railway station =

Railway station in Charvonay, Switzerland

Essert-Pittet
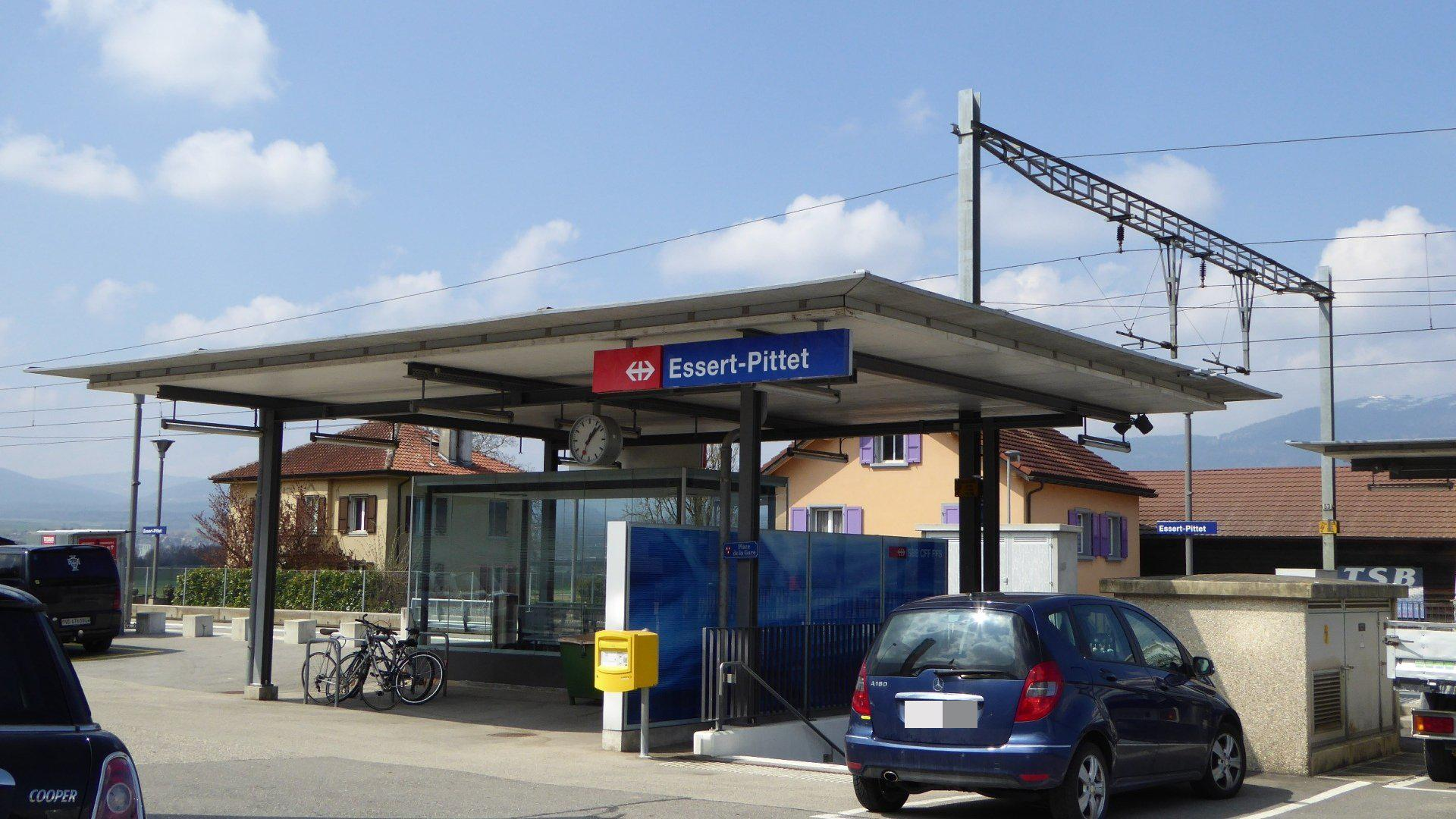
- The station in 2018

General information
- Location: Chavornay; Switzerland
- Coordinates: 46°43′40″N 6°34′50″E
- Elevation: 438 m (1,437 ft)
- Owner: Swiss Federal Railways
- Line: Jura Foot line
- Distance: 29.7 km (18.5 mi) from Lausanne
- Platforms: 2 (2 side platform)
- Tracks: 2
- Train operators: Swiss Federal Railways

Construction
- Cycle facilities: Yes (6 spaces)
- Accessible: Platforms only

Other information
- Station code: 8501111 (ESP)
- Fare zone: 42 (mobilis)

Passengers
- 2023: 80 per weekday (SBB)

Services
Preceding station	RER Vaud	Following station
Yverdon-les-Bains towards Grandson	R1	Chavornay towards Bex
Location

Essert-Pittet railway station (French: Gare de Essert-Pittet) is a railway station in the municipality of Chavornay, in the Swiss canton of Vaud. It is an intermediate stop on the standard gauge Jura Foot line of Swiss Federal Railways.

== Services ==
As of the December 2024 timetable change, the following services stop at Essert-Pittet:

- RER Vaud R1: hourly service between Grandson and Cully.
