= Funiculaire Suchard in Serrières =

Former industrial funicular railway in the canton of Neuchâtel, Switzerland

Overview
- Other name: Plan incliné de la gare de Serrières
- Status: ceased operation
- Coordinates: 46.983389°N 6.902869°E
- Termini: "Chocolat Suchard factory"; "Serrières railway station"
- Stations: 3

Service
- Type: funicular
- Operator(s): Société du plan incliné de la gare de Serrières

History
- Opened: 2 June 1892
- Closed: 1955 (71 years ago)

Technical
- Line length: 54.7 m (179 ft)
- Number of tracks: 1 with passing loop
- Track gauge: 1,000 mm (3 ft 3 3/8 in)
- Maximum incline: 60%

Funiculaire Suchard in Serrières was a funicular railway in Serrières, canton of Neuchâtel, Switzerland. The line connected the Chocolat Suchard factory in the Serrières valley with the Serrières railway station above. It had a length of 55 m for a difference of elevation of 28 m.

Société du plan incliné de la gare de Serrières was created in April 1890 to build and operate the line. The funicular was completed in 1892 based on plans by Henri Ladame. The company was closed in 1951 and the funicular was closed in 1954. Remnants were still visible in 2006. Musée d'Art et d'Histoire of Neuchâtel holds images of the funicular.

== See also ==
- Water balance railway
