= Chavornay railway station =

Railway station in Charvonay, Switzerland

Chavornay
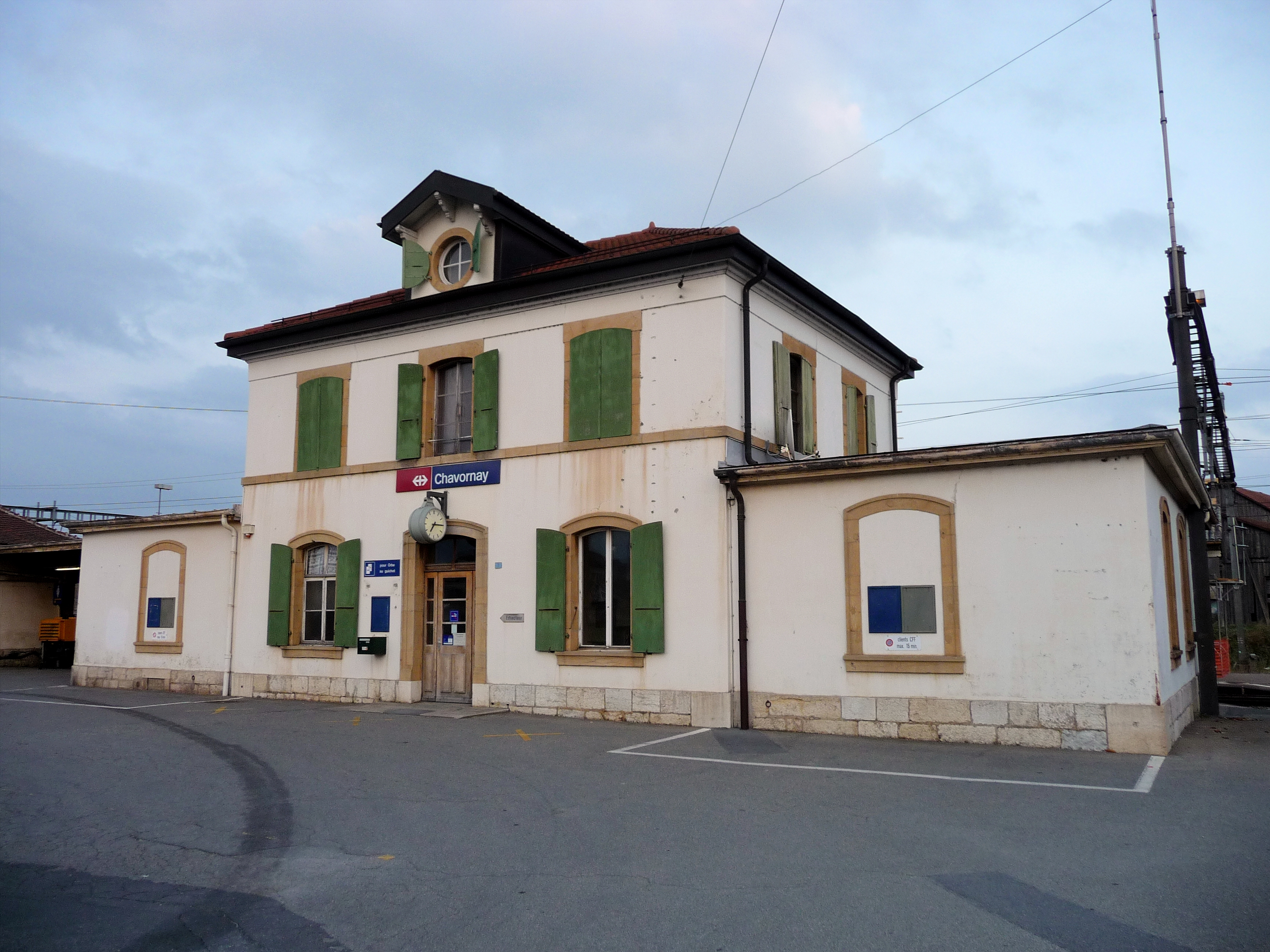
- The station building in 2009

General information
- Location: Chavornay; Switzerland
- Coordinates: 46°42′36″N 6°34′05″E
- Elevation: 447 m (1,467 ft)
- Owner: Swiss Federal Railways
- Lines: Jura Foot line; Orbe–Chavornay line
- Distance: 27.5 km (17.1 mi) from Lausanne
- Platforms: 3: 1 island platform; 1 side platform
- Tracks: 3
- Train operators: Swiss Federal Railways; Travys
- Connections: CarPostal SA buses; Travys bus line

Construction
- Parking: Yes (49 spaces)
- Cycle facilities: Yes (51 spaces)
- Accessible: SBB platforms only

Other information
- Station code: 8501112 (CHV)
- Fare zone: 42 and 43 (mobilis)

Passengers
- 2023: 2'600 per weekday (SBB)

Services
Preceding station	RER Vaud	Following station
Essert-Pittet towards Grandson	R1	Bavois towards Bex
Ependes VD towards Grandson	R2	Bavois towards Bex
Preceding station	Travys	Following station
Les Granges (Orbe) towards Orbe	R11	Terminus
Location

Chavornay railway station (French: Gare de Chavornay) is a railway station in the municipality of Chavornay, in the Swiss canton of Vaud. It is located at the junction of the standard gauge Jura Foot line of Swiss Federal Railways and Orbe–Chavornay line of Travys.

== Services ==
As of the December 2024 timetable change, the following services stop at Chavornay:

- R11: hourly service to Orbe.
- RER Vaud R1 / R2: half-hourly service between Grandson and Cully.
