= Succinct (disambiguation) =

Succinctness is a characteristic.

Succinct may also refer to:

- Succinct game, in algorithmic game theory
- Succinct problems with respect to the P versus NP problem
- Succinct data structure, a data structure in computer science
- The Wikipedia style guideline that recommends succinctness in articles

== See also ==
- Concise (disambiguation)
