= USS Concise =

Minesweeper of the United States Navy

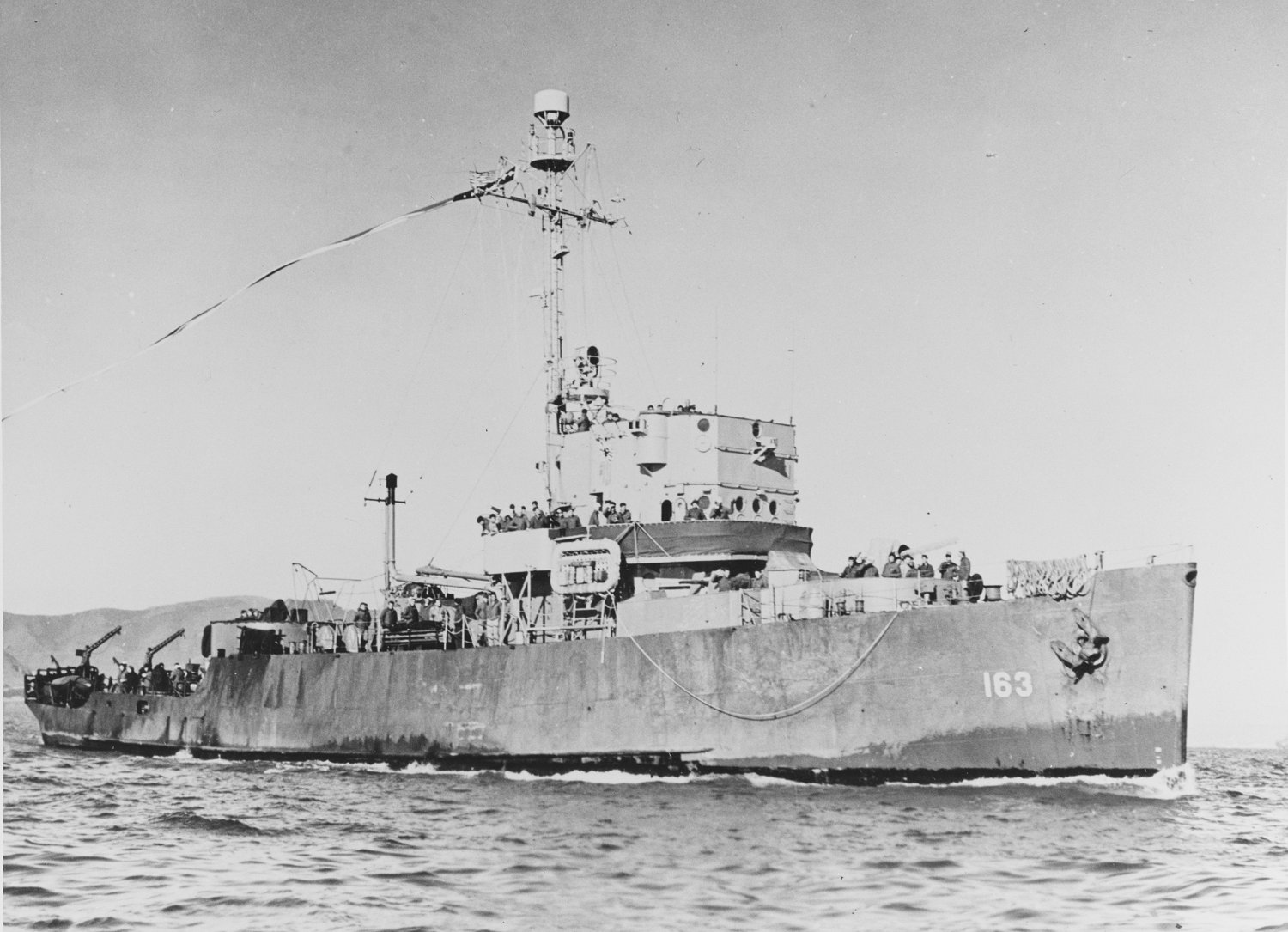
- Concise returns to San Francisco Bay flying her large homeward bound pennant.

History

United States
- Name: USS Concise
- Builder: Willamette Iron and Steel Works
- Laid down: 15 June 1942
- Launched: 6 January 1943
- Commissioned: 25 April 1944
- Decommissioned: 31 May 1946
- Reclassified: MSF-163, 7 February 1955
- Fate: Scrapped in 1959

General characteristics
- Class & type: Admirable-class minesweeper
- Displacement: 650 tons
- Length: 184 ft 6 in (56.24 m)
- Beam: 33 ft (10 m)
- Draft: 9 ft 9 in (2.97 m)
- Propulsion: 2 × ALCO 539 diesel engines, 1,710 shp (1.3 MW); Farrel-Birmingham single reduction gear; 2 shafts
- Speed: 14.8 knots (27.4 km/h)
- Complement: 104
- Armament: 1 × 3"/50 caliber gun DP; 2 × twin Bofors 40 mm guns; 1 × Hedgehog anti-submarine mortar; 2 × Depth charge tracks

Service record
- Part of: US Pacific Fleet (1944–1946)
- Awards: 1 Battle star

USS Concise (AM-163) was an Admirable-class minesweeper built for the U.S. Navy during World War II. She was built to clear minefields in offshore waters, and served the Navy in the Pacific Ocean.

She was reclassified AM-163, 21 February 1942; launched 6 February 1943 by Willamette Iron and Steel Works, Portland, Oregon; and commissioned 25 April 1944.

== World War II Pacific Ocean operations ==
Sailing from San Francisco, California, 3 July 1944 for Pearl Harbor, Concise arrived 13 July for training. She swept mines at French Frigate Shoals from 6 August to 16 August then sailed to Eniwetok, arriving 28 September. Assigned to convoy escort duty until 11 August 1945 Concise arrived off Okinawa, 30 August. On 8 September she sailed to clear mines from Japanese waters in protection of occupation shipping, sweeping off Wakayama, Osaka, and Nagoya until 20 November.

== Post-War Decommissioning ==
Concise returned to San Francisco, California, 16 December 1945 and was placed out of commission in reserve 31 May 1946 at San Diego, California. She was reclassified MSF-163 on 7 February 1955.

== Awards ==
Concise received one battle star for World War II service.
