= Orbe railway station =

Railway station in Orbe, Switzerland

Orbe
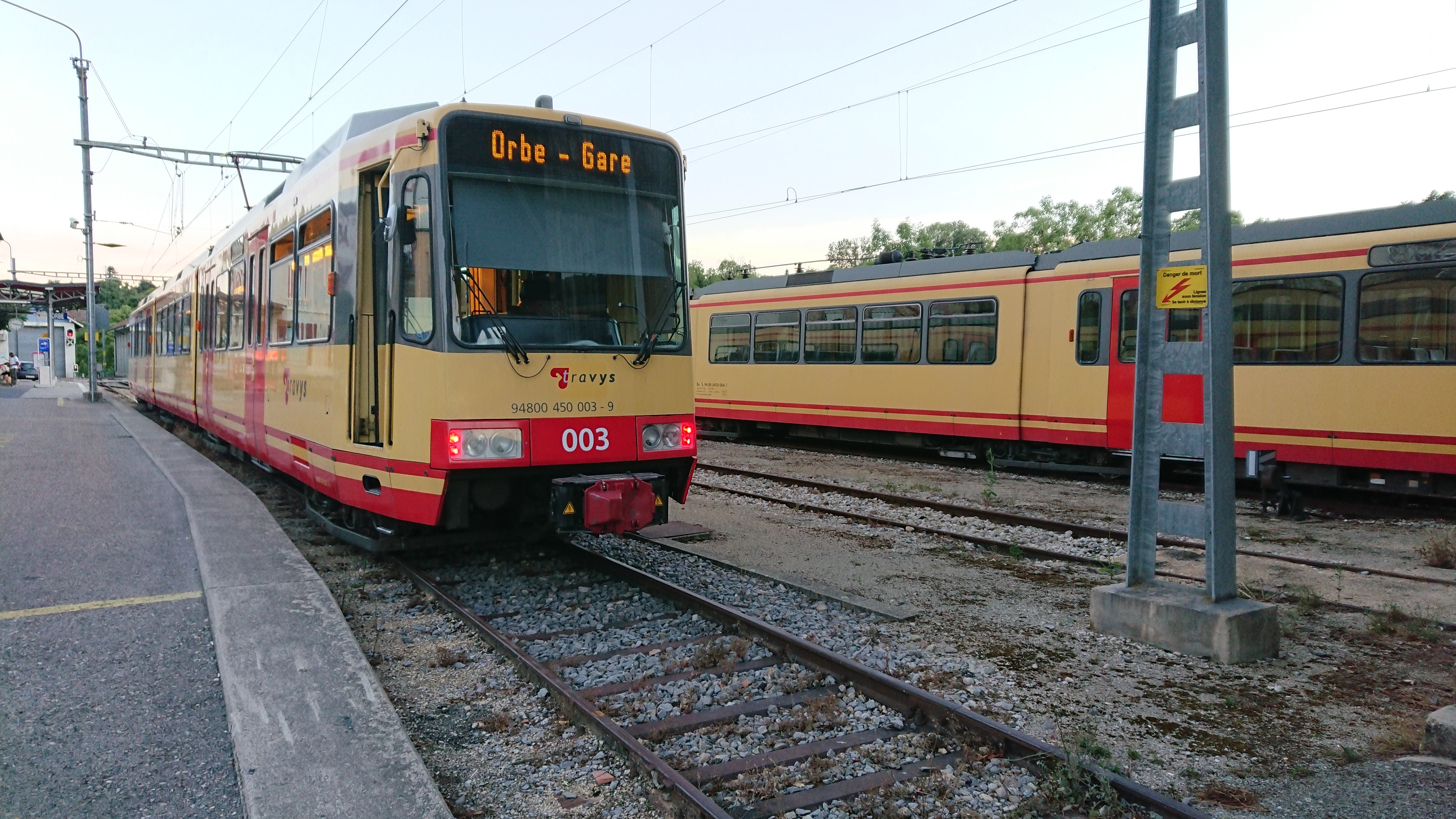
- A train at the station in 2022

General information
- Location: Orbe; Switzerland
- Coordinates: 46°43′N 6°32′E
- Elevation: 473 m (1,552 ft)
- Owner: Travys
- Line: Orbe–Chavornay line
- Platforms: 1 side platform
- Tracks: 1
- Train operators: Travys
- Connections: Travys buses

Construction
- Accessible: No

Other information
- Station code: 8501192 (ORBE)
- Fare zone: 48 (mobilis)

Services
Preceding station	Travys	Following station
Terminus	R11	St-Eloi towards Chavornay
Location

Orbe railway station (French: Gare de Orbe) is a railway station in the municipality of Orbe, in the Swiss canton of Vaud. It is the western terminus of the standard gauge Orbe–Chavornay line of Travys.

== Services ==
As of the December 2024 timetable change, the following services stop at Orbe:

- Regio: hourly or half-hourly service to Chavornay.
