= Concise railway station =

Railway station in Concise, Vaud, Switzerland

Concise
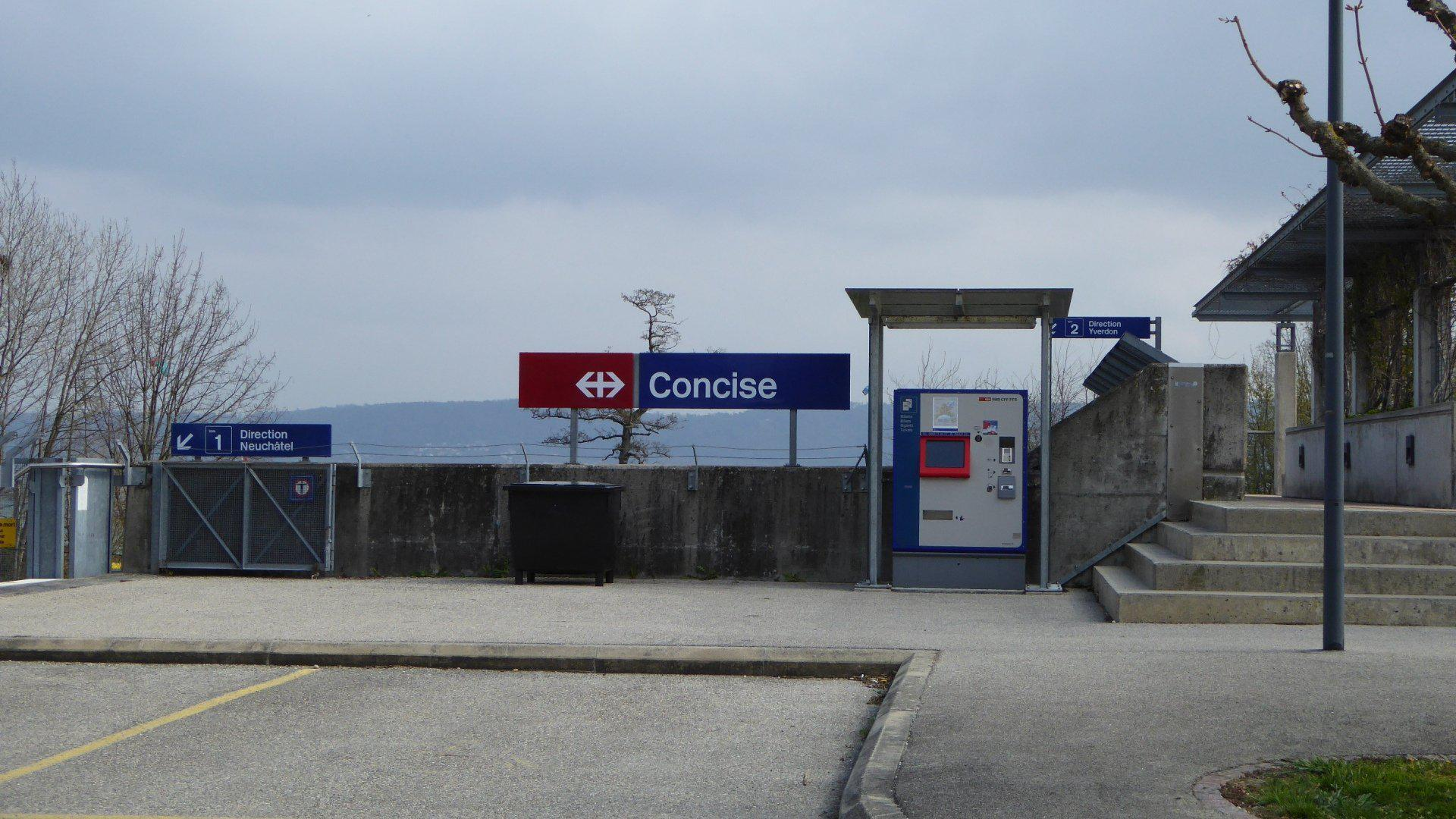
- The station entrance in 2018

General information
- Location: Concise; Switzerland
- Coordinates: 46°51′03″N 6°43′23″E
- Elevation: 429 m (1,407 ft)
- Owner: Swiss Federal Railways
- Line: Jura Foot line
- Distance: 50.7 km (31.5 mi) from Lausanne
- Platforms: 2 side platforms
- Tracks: 2
- Train operators: Swiss Federal Railways

Construction
- Parking: Yes (35 spaces)
- Accessible: No

Other information
- Station code: 8504203 (CC)
- Fare zone: 125 (Mobilis)

Passengers
- 2023: 60 per weekday (SBB)

Services
Preceding station	SBB CFF FFS	Following station
Yverdon-les-Bains Terminus	R13	Gorgier-St-Aubin towards Biel/Bienne
Location
- Location within Switzerland Location within Canton of Vaud

Concise railway station (French: Gare de Concise) is a railway station in the municipality of Concise, in the Swiss canton of Vaud. It is an intermediate stop on the standard gauge Jura Foot line of Swiss Federal Railways.

== Services ==
As of the December 2024 timetable change, the following services stop at Concise:

- Regio: hourly service between Biel/Bienne and Yverdon-les-Bains.
