= Orbe-Chavornay railway =

Railway line in Switzerland

Orbe-Chavornay railway line
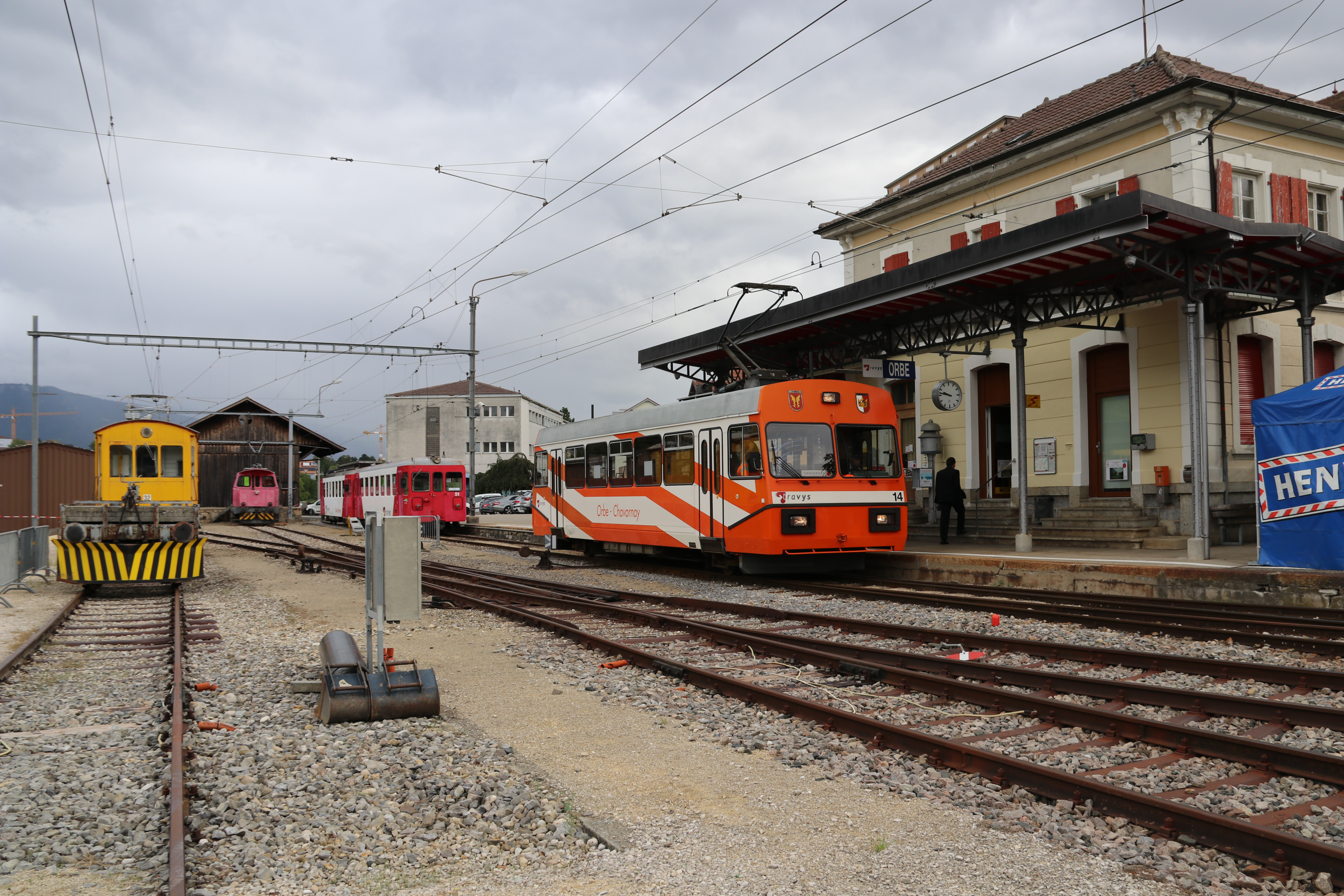
- Orbe railway station

Overview
- Status: Operational
- Owner: Travys
- Locale: Vaud, Switzerland
- Termini: Orbe railway station; Chavornay railway station
- Stations: 4

Service
- Operator: Travys

History
- Opened: 1894

Technical
- Line length: 3.9 km (2.4 mi)
- Num of tracks: Single track
- Track gauge: 1,435 mm (4 ft 8 1/2 in) standard gauge
- Electrification: 750 V DC overhead wire
Route map

The Orbe-Chavornay railway (OC) is a 3.9 km (2.4 mi) long standard gauge railway in Vaud, Switzerland which links the towns of Orbe and Chavornay, where there is an interchange with the Jura Foot Line. The line was opened in 1894 and was operated by electric traction from the start, as the first electrified standard-gauge railway in Switzerland. It is the only standard gauge railway in Switzerland using DC electrification.

The line was originally owned by the municipal power company but the original company was taken over by Travys in June 2003.

== Modernisation ==
The line is being upgraded and converted to the Swiss standard 15 kV AC system so that trains from Orbe can join the RER Vaud network. The modernisation will also provide accessible stations and increase capacity for goods traffic. The estimated costs of the project are 100 million Swiss francs. Passenger trains last ran on the old line on 13 December 2025 and buses have replaced them during the works. Freight trains are due to use the rebuilt line from 22 March 2027 and passenger trains from 5 April 2027. From then on the new RER Vaud line R10 will run from Orbe to Renens without a change at Chavornay and will be operated by the Swiss Federal Railways instead of Travys. Through trains to Lausanne are planned for a later date and depend on other projects such as the modernisation of Lausanne station.

To ease the transition and after the existing railcars faced technical defects, in 2022 Travys acquired two GT8-100C/2S tram-train vehicles from Albtal-Verkehrs-Gesellschaft. These previously operated on the Karlsruhe Stadtbahn and are equipped with both 750 V DC and 15 kV AC electrification.
