= Ste-Croix railway station =

Railway station in Sainte-Croix, Switzerland

Ste-Croix
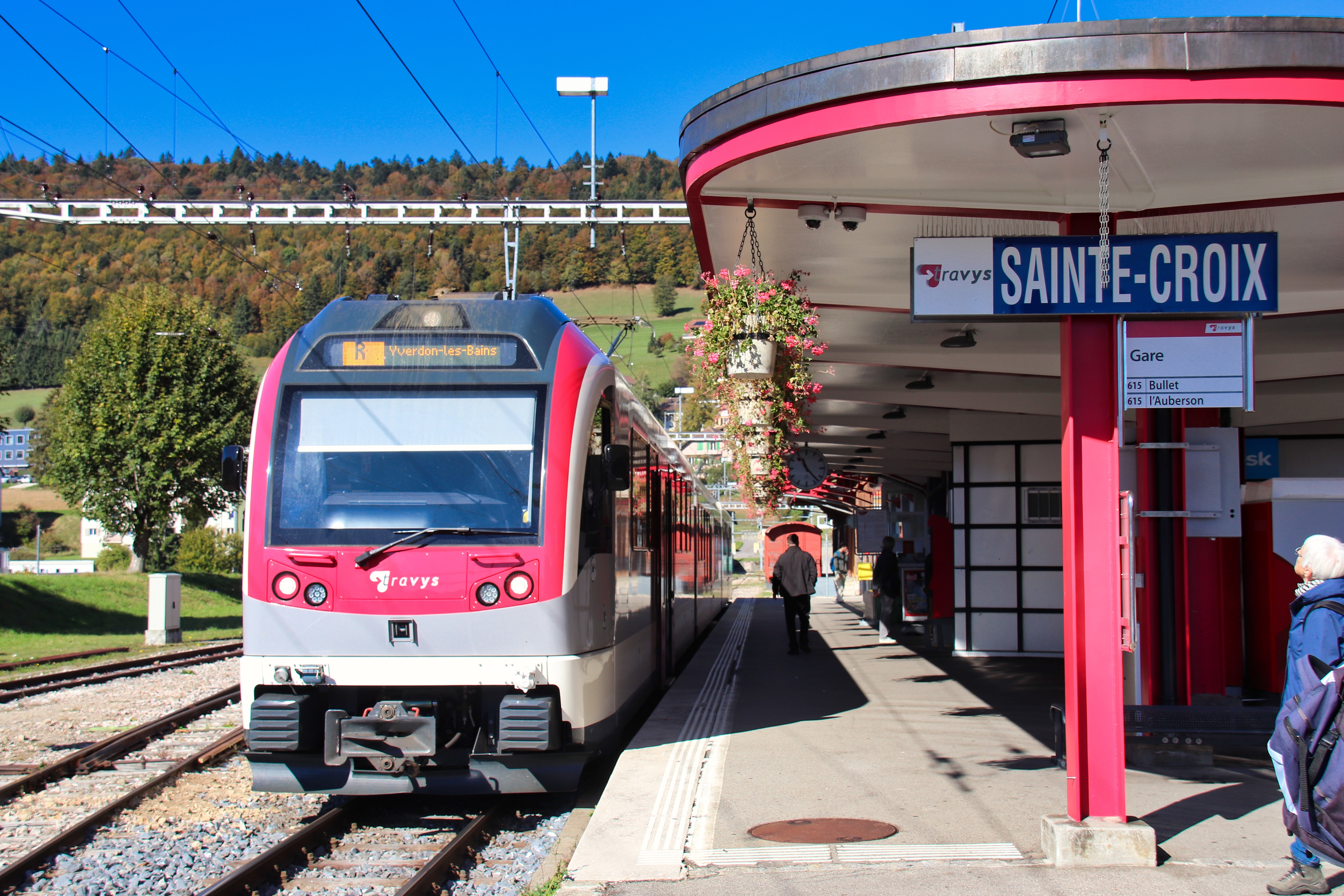
- A train at the station in 2018

General information
- Location: Sainte-Croix; Switzerland
- Coordinates: 46°49′N 6°30′E
- Elevation: 1,066 m (3,497 ft)
- Owner: Travys
- Line: Yverdon–Ste-Croix line
- Distance: 24.2 km (15.0 mi) from Yverdon-les-Bains
- Platforms: 2 side platforms
- Tracks: 2
- Train operators: Travys
- Connections: CarPostal SA buses; travys buses

Construction
- Accessible: Yes

Other information
- Station code: 8504298 (STCR)
- Fare zone: 120 (mobilis)

Services
| Preceding station | Travys | Following station |
|---|---|---|
| Terminus | R12 | Six-Fontaines towards Yverdon-les-Bains |
| Terminus | R22 | Six-Fontaines towards Yverdon-les-Bains |
Location

Ste-Croix railway station (French: Gare de Ste-Croix) is a railway station in the municipality of Sainte-Croix, in the Swiss canton of Vaud. It is the western terminus of the 1,000 mm (3 ft 3 3/8 in) gauge Yverdon–Ste-Croix line of Travys.

== Services ==
As of the December 2024 timetable change, the following services stop at Ste-Croix:

- Regio: half-hourly or hourly service to Yverdon-les-Bains.
