= Yverdon–Ste-Croix railway =

Narrow gauge railway line in canton of Vaud, Switzerland

Yverdon–Ste-Croix Railway line
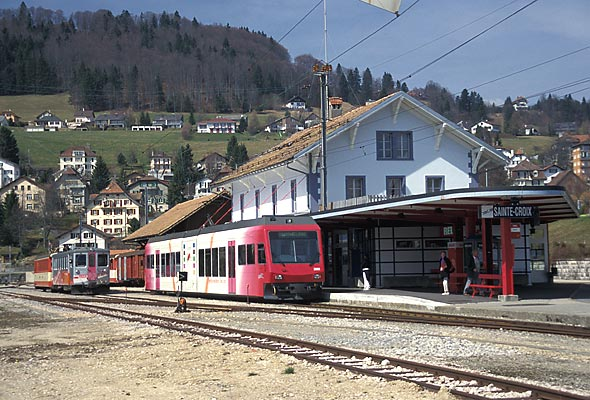
- The station at Ste-Croix

Overview
- Status: Operational
- Owner: TRAVYS
- Locale: Canton of Vaud, Switzerland
- Termini: Yverdon-les-Bains; Sainte-Croix
- Stations: 10

Service
- Type: Light rail
- Services: 1
- Operator(s): TRAVYS
- Depot(s): Yverdon-les-Bains

History
- Opened: 1893

Technical
- Line length: 24 km (15 mi)
- Number of tracks: Single track
- Track gauge: 1,000 mm (3 ft 3 3/8 in) metre gauge
- Minimum radius: 100 m (328 ft)
- Electrification: 15 kV 16.7 Hz AC overhead wire
- Maximum incline: 4.4%

The Yverdon to Sainte-Croix Railway (French: Chemin de fer Yverdon–Ste-Croix, YSteC) is a 1,000 mm (3 ft 3 3/8 in) metre gauge railway line and former railway company in Switzerland. The line connects the towns of Yverdon-les-Bains and Sainte-Croix, both in the canton of Vaud, and is some 24 kilometres (15 mi) long, overcoming a vertical height change of 633 metres (2,077 ft). It is now owned and operated by the TRAVYS company (Transports Vallée-de-Joux - Yverdon-les-Bains - Sainte-Croix).

== History ==
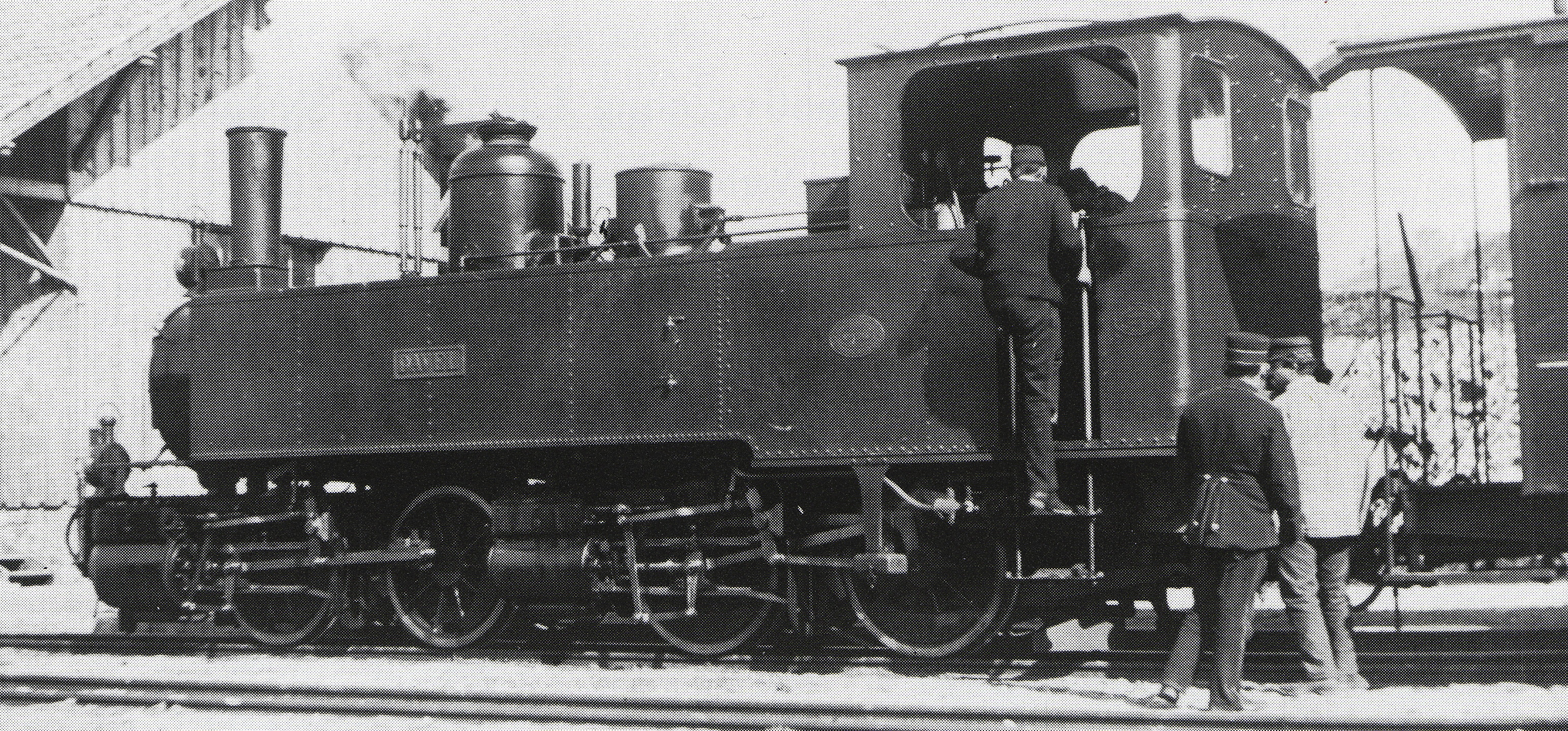
One of the original steam locomotives

The line was opened in 1893 by the Yverdon–Ste-Croix railway company, largely as a result of the influence of William Barbey from Valeyres-sous-Rances, who financed the building of the line. The line initially used steam locomotives to the articulated Mallet design. Because of the influence of the religious William Barbey, the line did not operate any trains on Sundays.

In 1918, after the death of William Barbey, the line began operations on Sundays. Like many Swiss railways, it suffered from a shortage of coal during the Second World War and, in 1945, it was electrified at 15 kV 16.7 Hz AC, using overhead wires.

In 1974 the railway pioneered the Vevey system of Rollbocks, which allows a train of standard-gauge wagons to be automatically loaded onto transporter bogies so that it can travel on a narrow-gauge line.

On February 14, 1976, two railcars collided head-to-head between Essert-sous-Champvent and Valeyres-sous-Montagny at about 50 km/h (31 mph). Seven people died and 40 others were injured. The accident was put down to human error; the two trains were scheduled to cross at Essert-sous-Champvent, but the line was not equipped with automatic block signalling that would have prevented the accident.

In 2001, the Yverdon–Ste-Croix railway company was merged with the Pont-Brassus railway company and the Transports Publics Yverdon-Grandson bus company to form the new TRAVYS company. The company has since also absorbed the Orbe–Chavornay railway company.

In 2013 and as part of a joint order with Transports de la région Morges-Bière-Cossonay, the Montreux–Oberland Bernois railway and Transports publics fribourgeois, TRAVYS ordered three new trains for the Yverdon–Ste-Croix railway from Stadler Rail. Of these, two will be used to replace older stock, whilst the third will allow the introduction of a half-hourly service on the line. The trains are due for delivery in 2015.

== Locomotives and rolling stock ==
No.	Type	Seats: 2nd	Builders Details	Date Built	Notes	Image
1	Be4/4	40	ACMV/SIG/SAAS	1981	Named "Yverdon - les - Bains"	
2	Be4/4	40	ACMV/SIG/SAAS	1981	Named "Baulmes".	
3	Be4/4	40	ACMV/SIG/SAAS	1981	2004 sold to Chemin de fer Bière-Apples-Morges as No.15	
4	Be4/4	46	SIG/BBC	1945	withdrawn March 2008	
5	Be4/4	46	SIG/BBC	1945		
21	Ge4/4		YSC/SIG/BBC	1950		
22	B		SIG	1893	Sold to Chemin de Fer de la Baie de Somme (CFBS)	
22"	Tm2/2		Schöma/Deutz	1971		
23	Tm2/2		RACO/Cummins	1989		
26	BF		SIG	1893	Sold to CFBS	
27	BF		SIG	1893	Sold to CFBS	
31	B		SIG	1929	Sold to CFBS	
32	B		SIG	1929	Sold to CFBS	
35	B	64	SWP	1968	Wired as intermediate coach for 1-3/51-53 and 4-5/54	
36	Ars		SIG/RhB/Travys	1913	ex-RhB B 2218, saloon "La Traverse". Rebuilt in 1960 (RhB) and again in 2002 (Travys).	
51	Bt	56	ACMV/SAAS	1983	Driving Trailer for 1-3/2000-01	
52	Bt	56	ACMV/SAAS	1983	2004 sold to BAM as No.54	
52"	Bt		Stadler	2007	Driving Trailer for 1-2/2000-01	
53	BDt	64	SWP/SWA	1968	Ex-No.33, Rebuilt in 1991 from B, driving trailer for 1-3/2000-01	
54	BDt	64	SWP/SWA	1968	Ex-No.34, Rebuilt in 1991 from B, driving trailer for 4	
55	Bt	64	ACMV/SAAS	1981		
2000	Be2/6	88	Stadler/Adtranz	2001	Stadler GTW	
2001	Be2/6	88	Stadler/Adtranz	2001	Stadler GTW	
