= Yverdon-les-Bains railway station =

Railway station in Yverdon-les-Bains, Switzerland

Yverdon-les-Bains
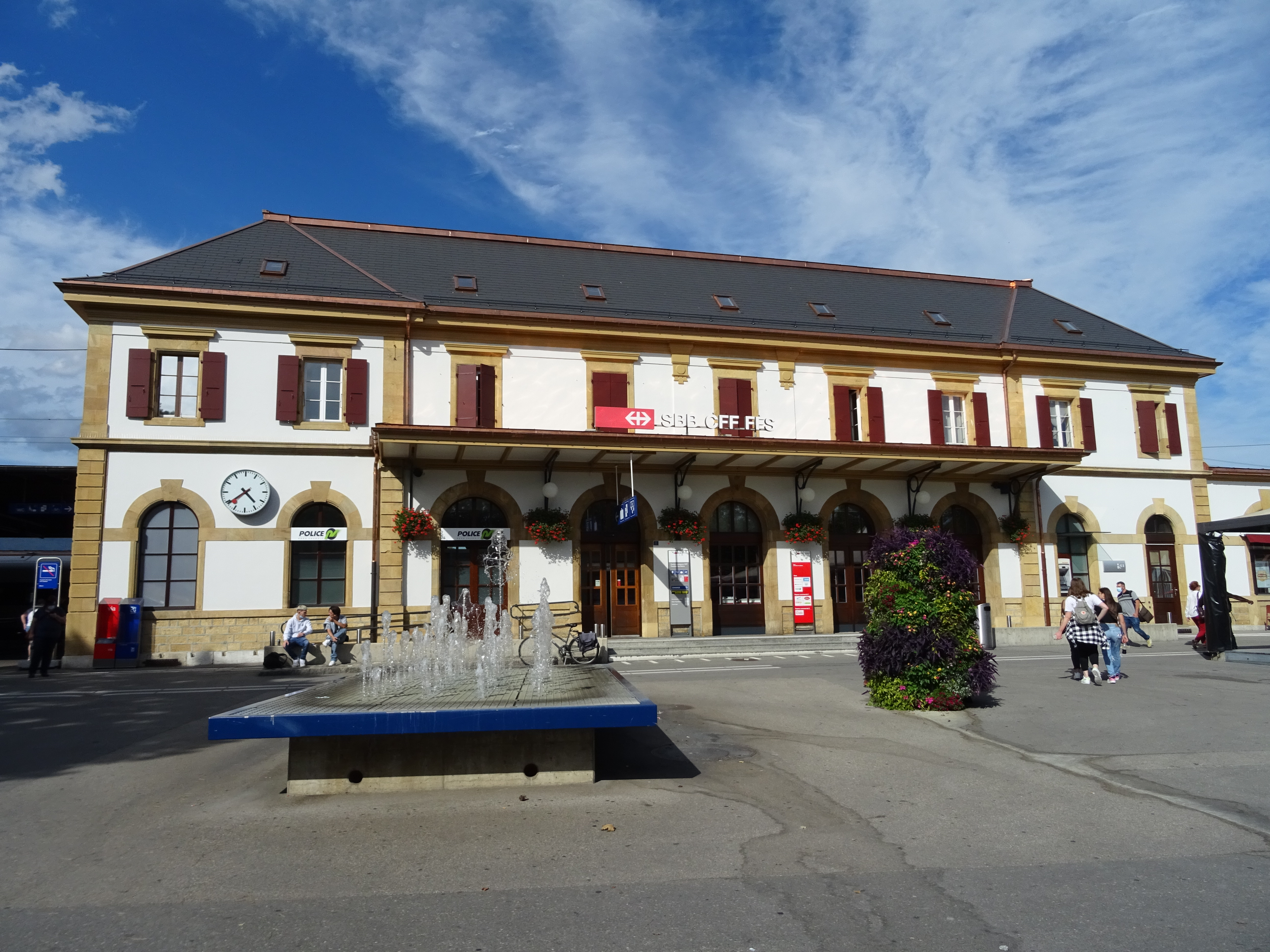
- The station building in 2009

General information
- Location: Yverdon-les-Bains; Switzerland
- Coordinates: 46°46′55″N 6°38′28″E
- Elevation: 434 m (1,424 ft)
- Owner: Swiss Federal Railways
- Lines: Fribourg–Yverdon line; Jura Foot line; Yverdon–Ste-Croix line
- Distance: 39.1 km (24.3 mi) from Lausanne
- Platforms: 5: 2 island platform; 1 side platform
- Tracks: 5
- Train operators: Swiss Federal Railways; Travys
- Connections: CarPostal SA buses; travys buses

Construction
- Parking: Yes (240 spaces)
- Cycle facilities: Yes (140 spaces)
- Accessible: Yes

Other information
- Station code: 8504200 (YV)
- Fare zone: 40 (mobilis)

History
- Former names: Yverdon (until 2001)

Passengers
- 2025: 19,300 per day (SBB)
- Rank: 39 out of 1,095 (Note: Tied with Nyon railway station.)

Services
Preceding station	SBB CFF FFS	Following station
Neuchâtel towards Zürich Hauptbahnhof, St. Gallen or Rorschach	IC 5	Renens VD towards Lausanne
Neuchâtel towards Basel SBB	IC 51	Renens VD towards Lausanne
Neuchâtel Terminus	IR 57	Morges towards Geneva Airport
Concise towards Biel/Bienne	R13	Terminus
Preceding station	RER Vaud	Following station
Grandson Terminus	R1	Essert-Pittet towards Bex
Grandson Terminus	R2	Ependes VD towards Bex
Preceding station	RER Fribourg	Following station
Terminus	S30	Yvonand towards Fribourg/Freiburg
Terminus	S30	Yvonand towards Fribourg/Freiburg
Preceding station	Travys	Following station
Yverdon William Barbey towards Ste-Croix	R12	Terminus
Vuiteboeuf towards Ste-Croix	R22	Terminus
Location

Yverdon-les-Bains railway station (French: Gare d'Yverdon-les-Bains) is a railway station in the municipality of Yverdon-les-Bains, in the Swiss canton of Vaud. It is located at the junction of the standard gauge Fribourg–Yverdon and Jura Foot lines of Swiss Federal Railways and the 1,000 mm (3 ft 3 3/8 in) gauge Yverdon–Ste-Croix line of Travys.

== Services ==
As of the December 2025 timetable change, the following services stop at Yverdon-les-Bains:

- InterCity: half-hourly service between Lausanne and Biel/Bienne and hourly service to Rorschach and Basel SBB.
- InterRegio: limited service between Geneva Airport and Neuchâtel.
- Regio:
  - half-hourly or hourly service to Ste-Croix.
  - hourly service to Biel/Bienne.
- RER Vaud R1 / R2: half-hourly service between Grandson and Cully.
- RER Fribourg S30 S30: half-hourly service to Fribourg/Freiburg.
