= Travys =

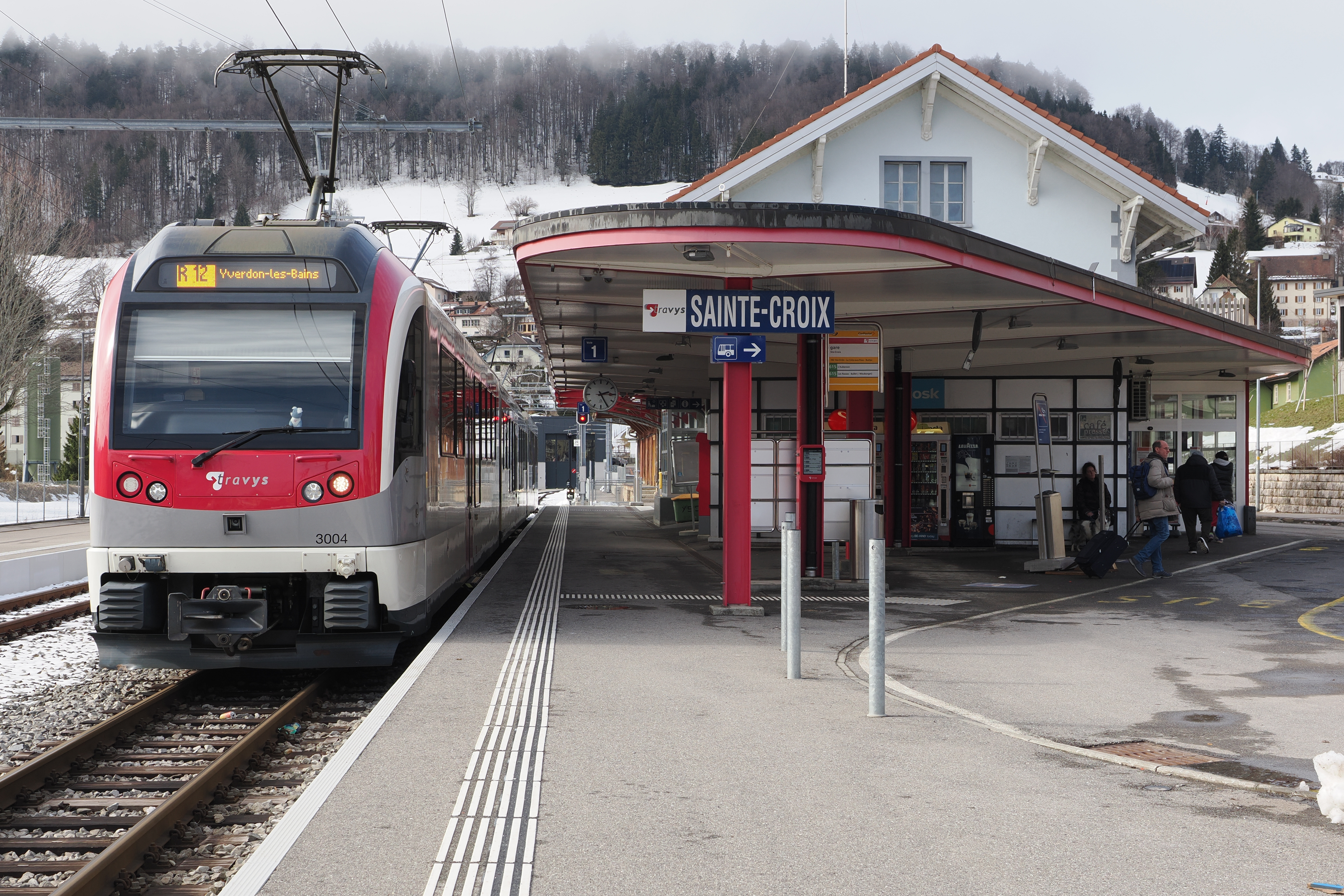
Ste-Croix station

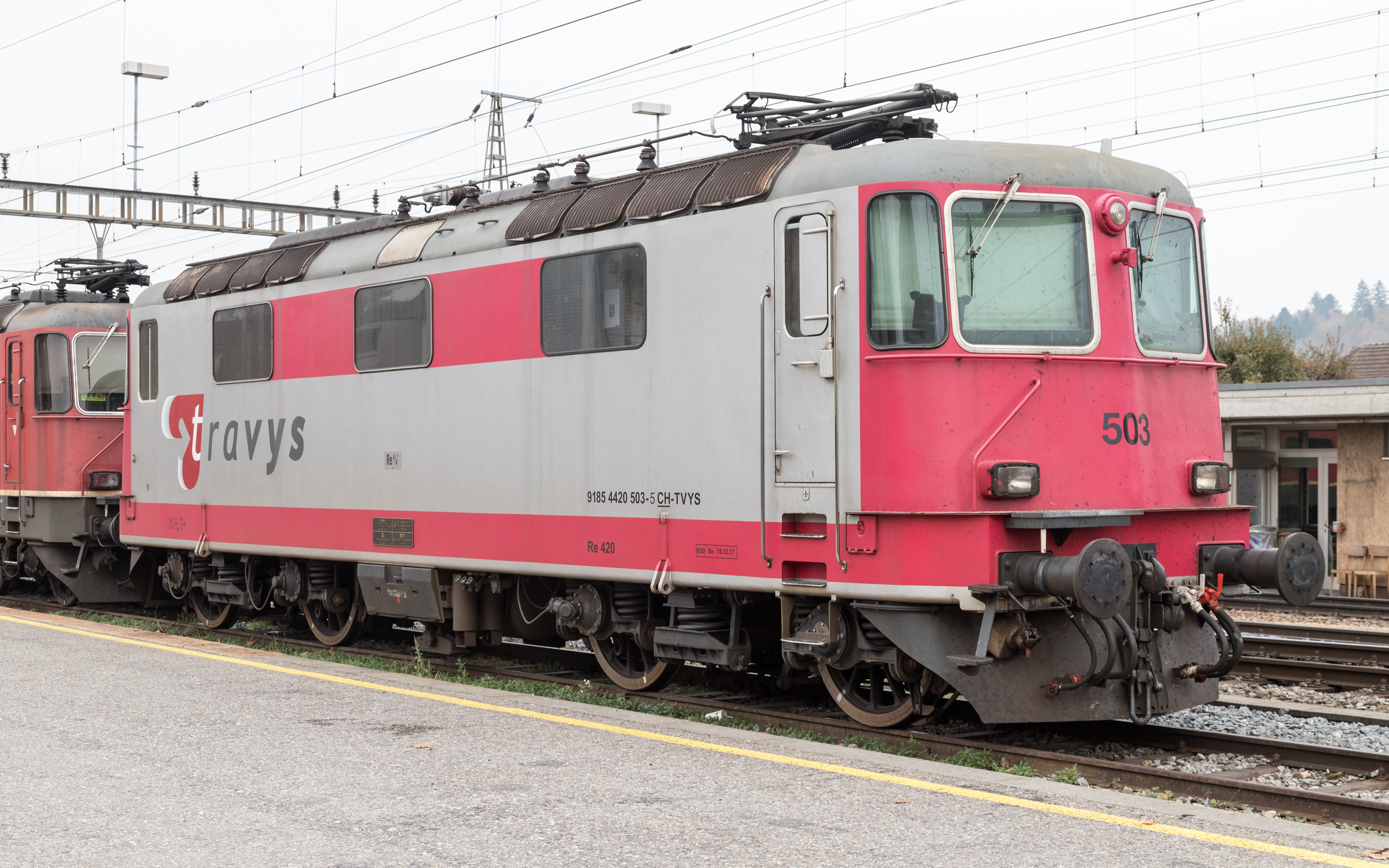
Travys Re 420 No. 503 in Aarberg BE

Travys is the brand name of a public transport company operating several rail and bus lines in the Yverdon region in the north of the Swiss canton of Vaud. Its name is based is on an acronym for Transports Vallée de Joux–Yverdon-les-Bains–Ste-Croix ("valley of Joux–Yverdon-les-Bains–Ste-Croix transport"). It was created on 1 January 2001 from the merger of the following companies:

- Yverdon–Ste-Croix Railway (Chemin de fer Yverdon–Ste-Croix; YSteC)
- Pont–Brassus Railway (Chemin de fer Pont–Brassus; PBr)
- Transports publics Yverdon-Grandson et environs (TPYG)

Travys also took over the management of the Orbe-Chavornay railway (Chemin de fer Orbe–Chavornay; OC) on 1 June 2003. The shares of the Usines de l'Orbe ("Orbe power stations") were later acquired and the OC was fully merged into Travys in 2008.

The YSteC and PBr railways as well as the TPYG bus operation worked closely together for several decades. YSteC and TPYG cooperated from 1954 and PBr was jointly managed with YSteC from 1981.

== Network ==
The company owns the following lines:

- the standard gauge Vallorbe–Le Brassus railway line (operations managed by the SBB)
- the metre gauge Yverdon–Ste-Croix railway
- the standard gauge Orbe-Chavornay railway (OC) between Orbe and Chavornay
- the city bus lines from Yverdon and the bus lines to the adjacent towns of Cheseaux-Noréaz, Montagny and Chamblon
- the Yverdon–Orbe–Vallorbe fast bus line (connecting to TGV services, among other things)
- the L'Auberson–Sainte-Croix–Bullet–Mauborget bus line
