= Belfaux-Village railway station =

Railway station in Belfaux, Switzerland

Belfaux-Village
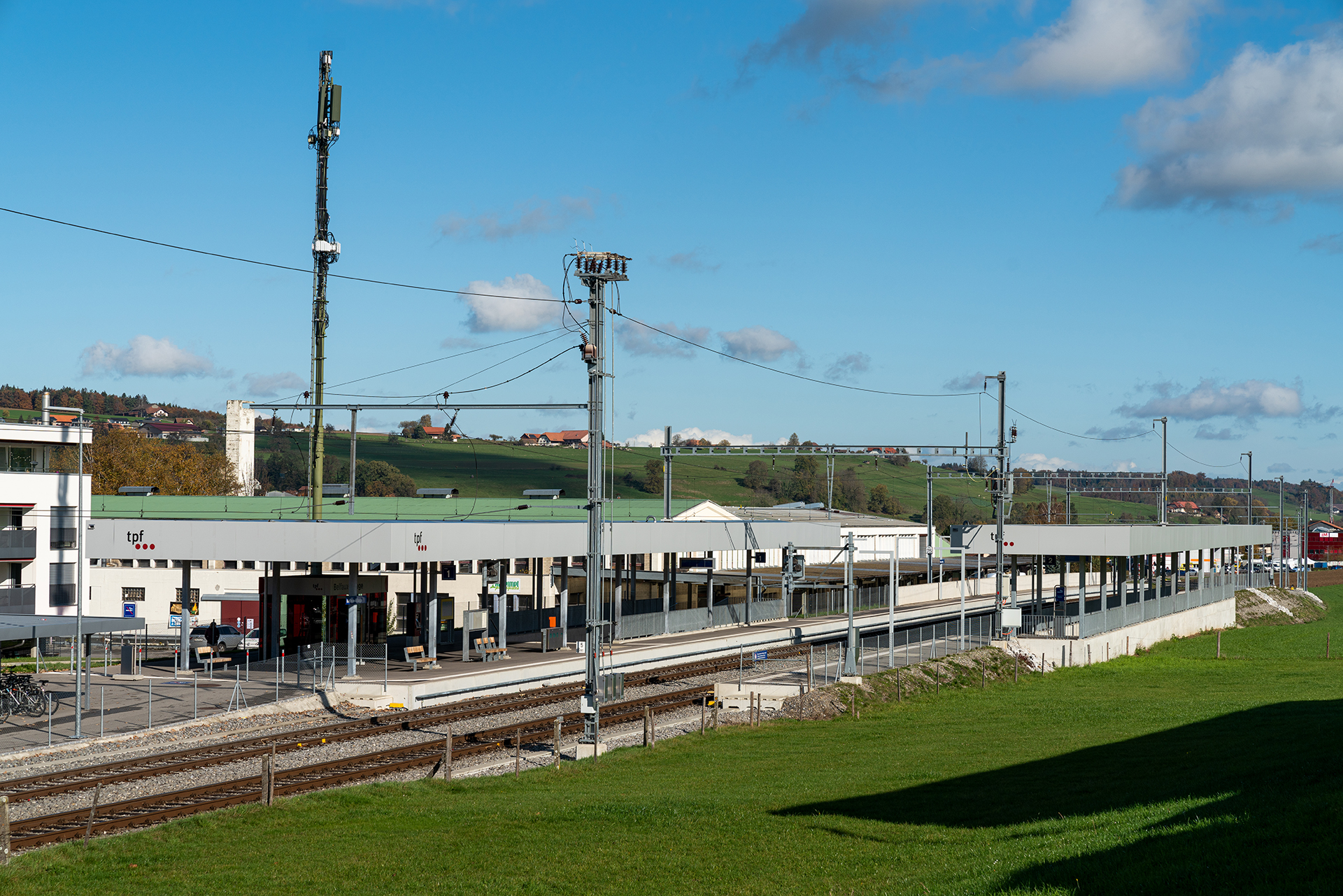
- The station in 2019

General information
- Location: Belfaux; Switzerland
- Coordinates: 46°49′22″N 7°06′37″E
- Elevation: 587 m (1,926 ft)
- Owner: Transports publics Fribourgeois
- Line: Fribourg–Ins line
- Distance: 5.8 km (3.6 mi) from Fribourg/Freiburg
- Platforms: 2 (2 side platforms)
- Tracks: 2
- Train operators: Transports publics Fribourgeois
- Connections: Transports publics Fribourgeois night buses

Construction
- Parking: Yes (28 spaces)
- Accessible: Yes

Other information
- Station code: 8504182 (BFV)
- Fare zone: 11 (frimobil)

Services
Preceding station	RER Fribourg	Following station
Pensier towards Neuchâtel	S20	Givisiez towards Fribourg/Freiburg
Pensier towards Neuchâtel	S21	Givisiez towards Fribourg/Freiburg
Location

Belfaux-Village railway station (French: Gare de Belfaux-Village) is a railway station in the municipality of Belfaux, in the Swiss canton of Fribourg. It is an intermediate stop on the standard gauge Fribourg–Ins line of Transports publics Fribourgeois. The station is 750 metres (2,460 ft) north of Belfaux CFF on the Fribourg–Yverdon line.

== Services ==
As of the December 2024 timetable change, the following services stop at Belfaux-Village:

- RER Fribourg S20 / S21: half-hourly service between Neuchâtel and Fribourg/Freiburg.
