= Pensier railway station =

Railway station in Courtepin, Switzerland

Pensier
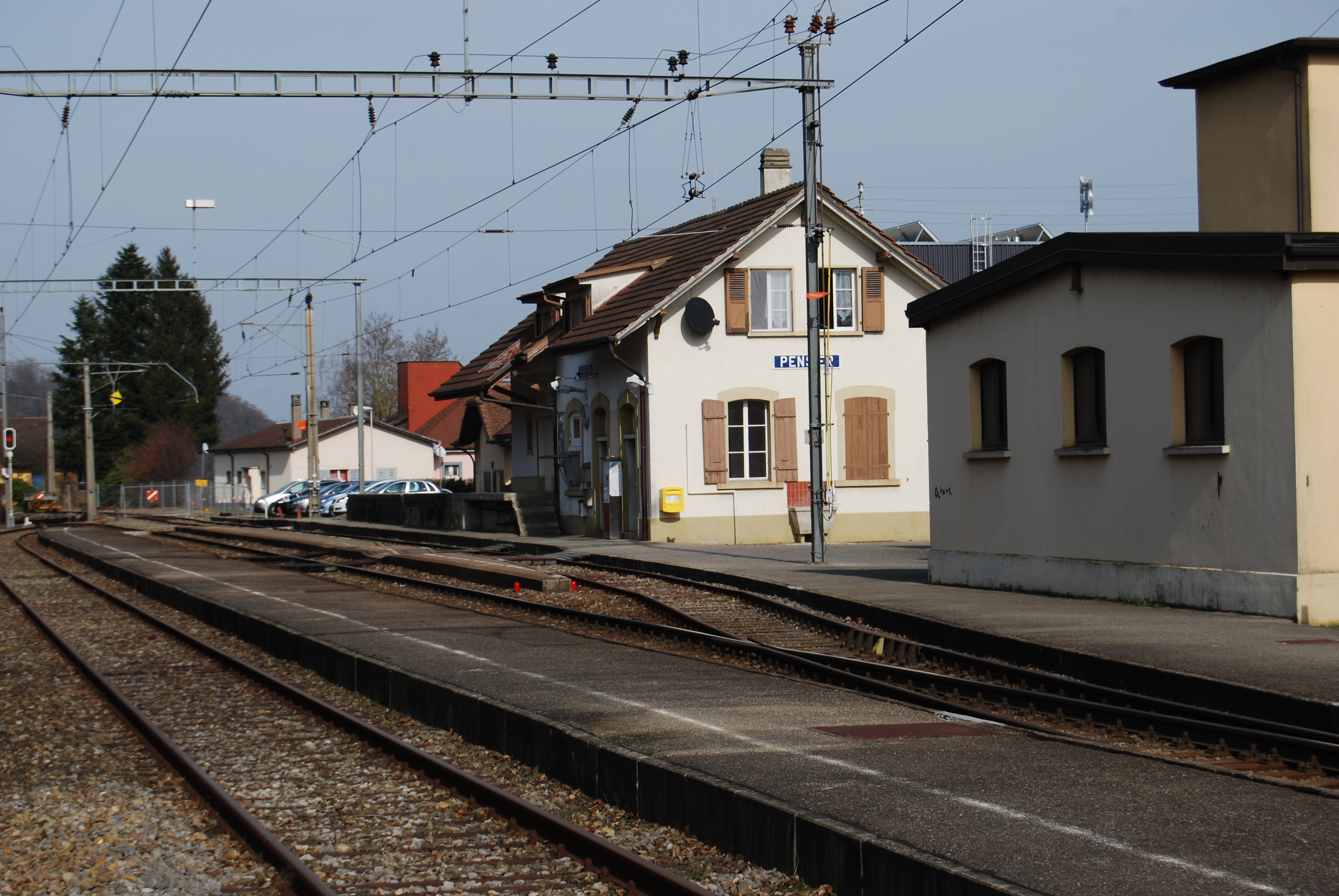
- The station in 2014

General information
- Location: Courtepin; Switzerland
- Coordinates: 46°50′30″N 7°08′07″E
- Elevation: 551 m (1,808 ft)
- Owner: Transports publics Fribourgeois
- Line: Fribourg–Ins line
- Distance: 9.2 km (5.7 mi) from Fribourg/Freiburg
- Platforms: 2 (2 side platforms)
- Tracks: 2
- Train operators: Transports publics Fribourgeois

Construction
- Accessible: Yes

Other information
- Station code: 8504183 (PEN)
- Fare zone: 11 and 53 (frimobil)

Services
Preceding station	RER Fribourg	Following station
Courtepin towards Neuchâtel	S20	Belfaux-Village towards Fribourg/Freiburg
Courtepin towards Neuchâtel	S21	Belfaux-Village towards Fribourg/Freiburg
Location

Pensier railway station (French: Gare de Pensier) is a railway station in the municipality of Courtepin, in the Swiss canton of Fribourg. It is an intermediate stop on the standard gauge Fribourg–Ins line of Transports publics Fribourgeois.

== Services ==
As of the December 2024 timetable change, the following services stop at Pensier:

- RER Fribourg S20 / S21: half-hourly service between Neuchâtel and Fribourg/Freiburg.
