= Münchenwiler-Courgevaux railway station =

Railway station in Münchenwiler, Switzerland

Münchenwiler-Courgevaux
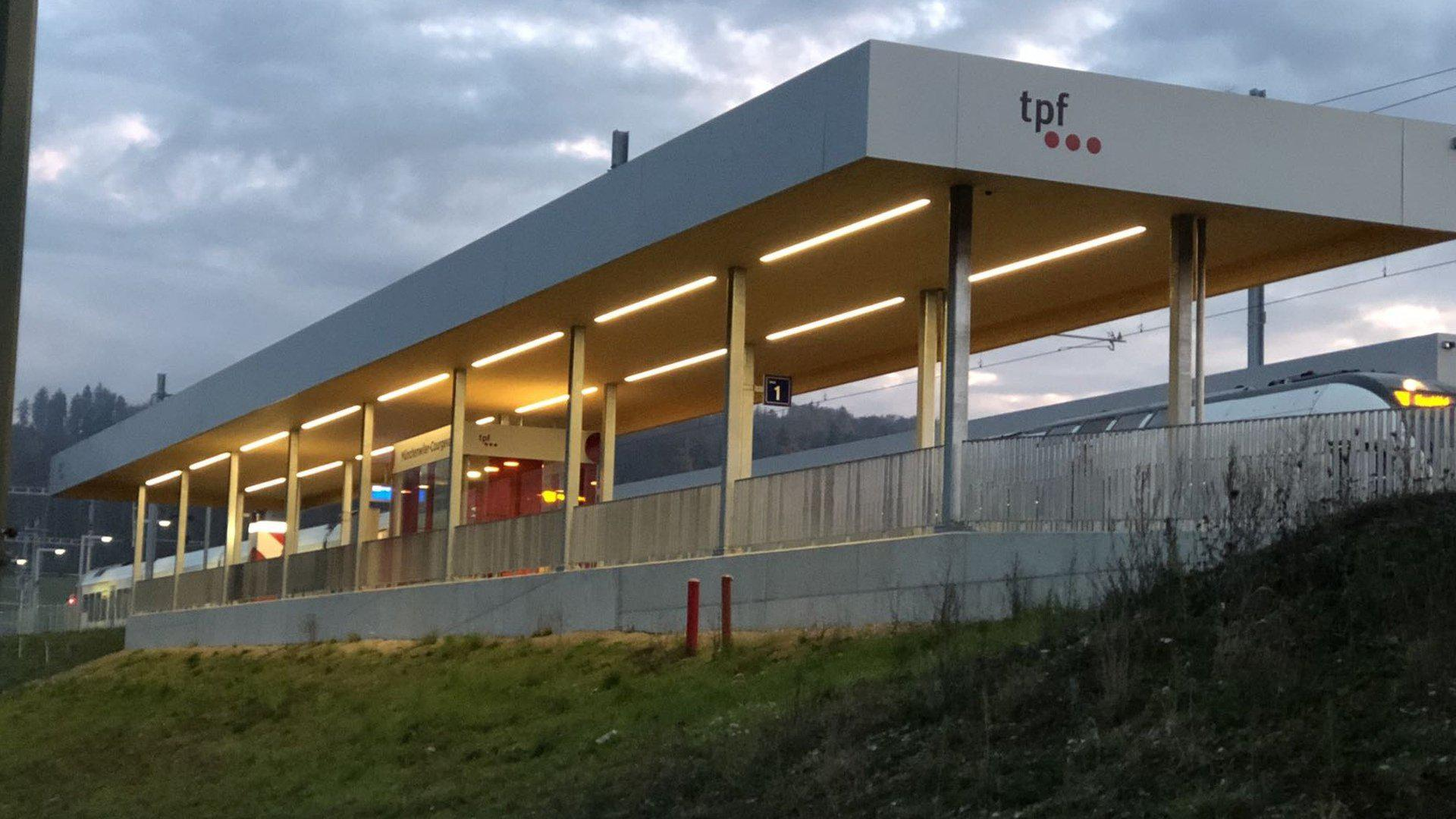
- The station in 2018

General information
- Location: Münchenwiler; Switzerland
- Coordinates: 46°54′39″N 7°06′58″E
- Elevation: 481 m (1,578 ft)
- Owner: Transports publics Fribourgeois
- Line: Fribourg–Ins line
- Distance: 20.6 km (12.8 mi) from Fribourg/Freiburg
- Platforms: 2 (2 side platforms)
- Tracks: 2
- Train operators: Transports publics Fribourgeois
- Connections: Transports publics Fribourgeois buses

Construction
- Parking: Yes (10 spaces)
- Accessible: Yes

Other information
- Station code: 8504186 (MUCO)
- Fare zone: 50 (frimobil)

Services
Preceding station	RER Fribourg	Following station
Murten/Morat towards Neuchâtel	S20	Cressier FR towards Fribourg/Freiburg
Murten/Morat towards Neuchâtel	S21	Cressier FR towards Fribourg/Freiburg
Location

Münchenwiler-Courgevaux railway station (German: Bahnhof Münchenwiler-Courgevaux, French: Gare de Münchenwiler-Courgevaux) is a railway station in the municipality of Münchenwiler, in the Swiss canton of Bern. It is an intermediate stop on the standard gauge Fribourg–Ins line of Transports publics Fribourgeois.

== Services ==
As of the December 2024 timetable change, the following services stop at Münchenwiler-Courgevaux:

- RER Fribourg S20 / S21: half-hourly service between Neuchâtel and Fribourg/Freiburg.
