= Givisiez railway station =

Railway station in Givisiez, Switzerland

Givisiez
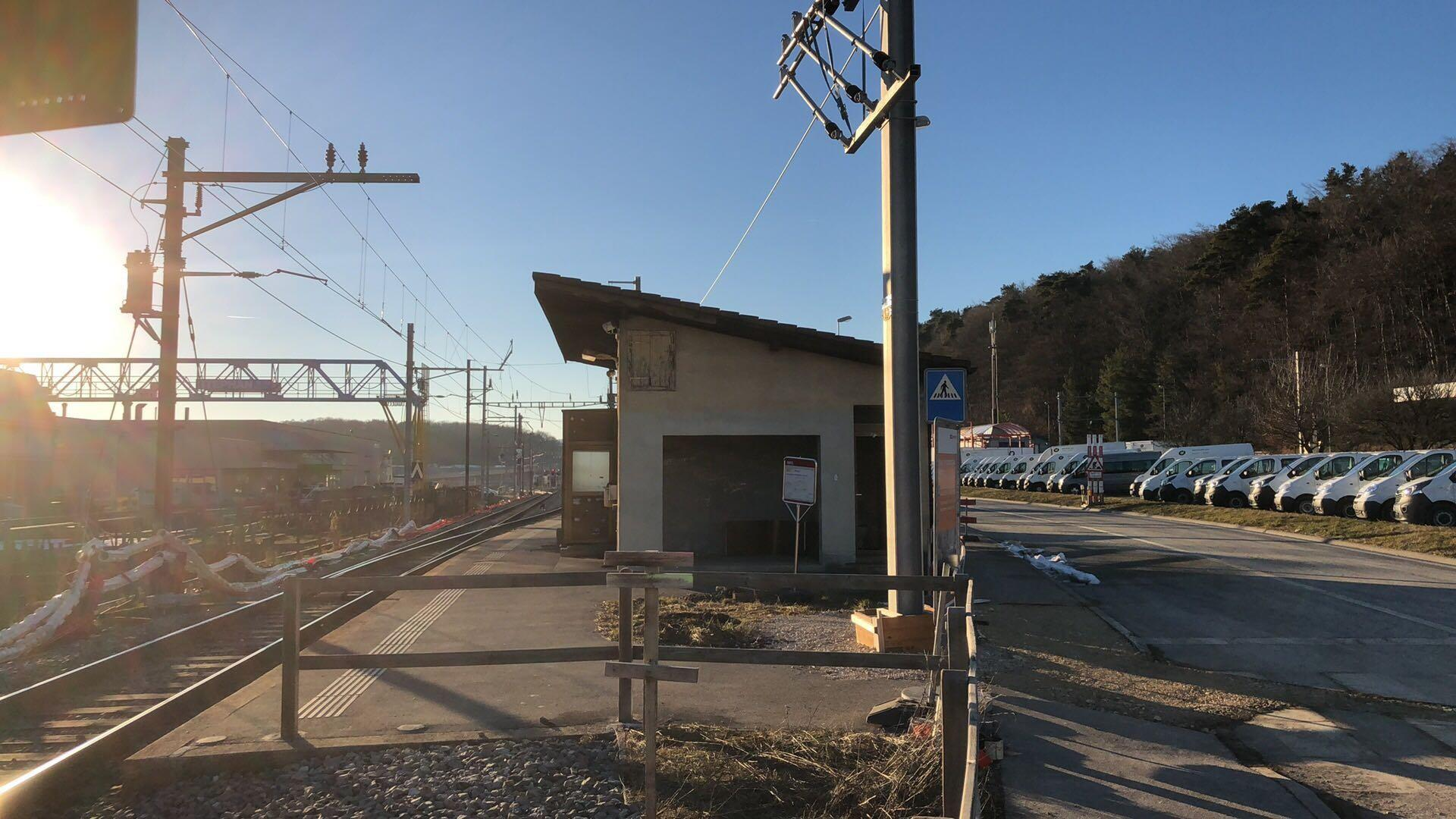

General information
- Location: Givisiez; Switzerland
- Coordinates: 46°49′00″N 7°07′48″E
- Elevation: 615 m (2,018 ft)
- Owner: Swiss Federal Railways
- Lines: Fribourg–Ins line; Fribourg–Yverdon line
- Distance: 4.0 km (2.5 mi) from Fribourg/Freiburg; 46.0 km (28.6 mi) from Yverdon-les-Bains
- Platforms: 2 (1 island platform)
- Tracks: 2
- Train operators: Swiss Federal Railways; Transports publics Fribourgeois
- Connections: Transports publics Fribourgeois buses

Construction
- Parking: Yes
- Accessible: Yes

Other information
- Station code: 8504181 (GIV)
- Fare zone: 10 (frimobil)

History
- Opened: 15 December 2019

Passengers
- 2023: 1'000 per weekday (SBB, TPF)

Services
Preceding station	RER Fribourg	Following station
Belfaux-Village towards Neuchâtel	S20	Fribourg/Freiburg Terminus
Belfaux-Village towards Neuchâtel	S21	Fribourg/Freiburg Terminus
Belfaux CFF towards Yverdon-les-Bains	S30	Fribourg/Freiburg Terminus
Belfaux CFF towards Yverdon-les-Bains	S30	Fribourg/Freiburg Terminus
Location

Givisiez railway station (French: Gare de Givisiez) is a railway station in the municipality of Givisiez, in the Swiss canton of Fribourg. It is located at the junction of the standard gauge Fribourg–Ins line of Transports publics Fribourgeois and the Fribourg–Yverdon line of Swiss Federal Railways.

The current facility opened on 15 December 2019, replacing a platform to the west. The new station has additional track capacity and a longer platform permitting additional service.

== Services ==
As of the December 2024 timetable change, the following services stop at Givisiez:

- RER Fribourg:
  - S20 / S21: half-hourly service between Neuchâtel and Fribourg/Freiburg.
  - S30 S30: half-hourly service between Yverdon-les-Bains and Fribourg/Freiburg.
