= Courtepin railway station =

Railway station in Courtepin, Switzerland

Courtepin
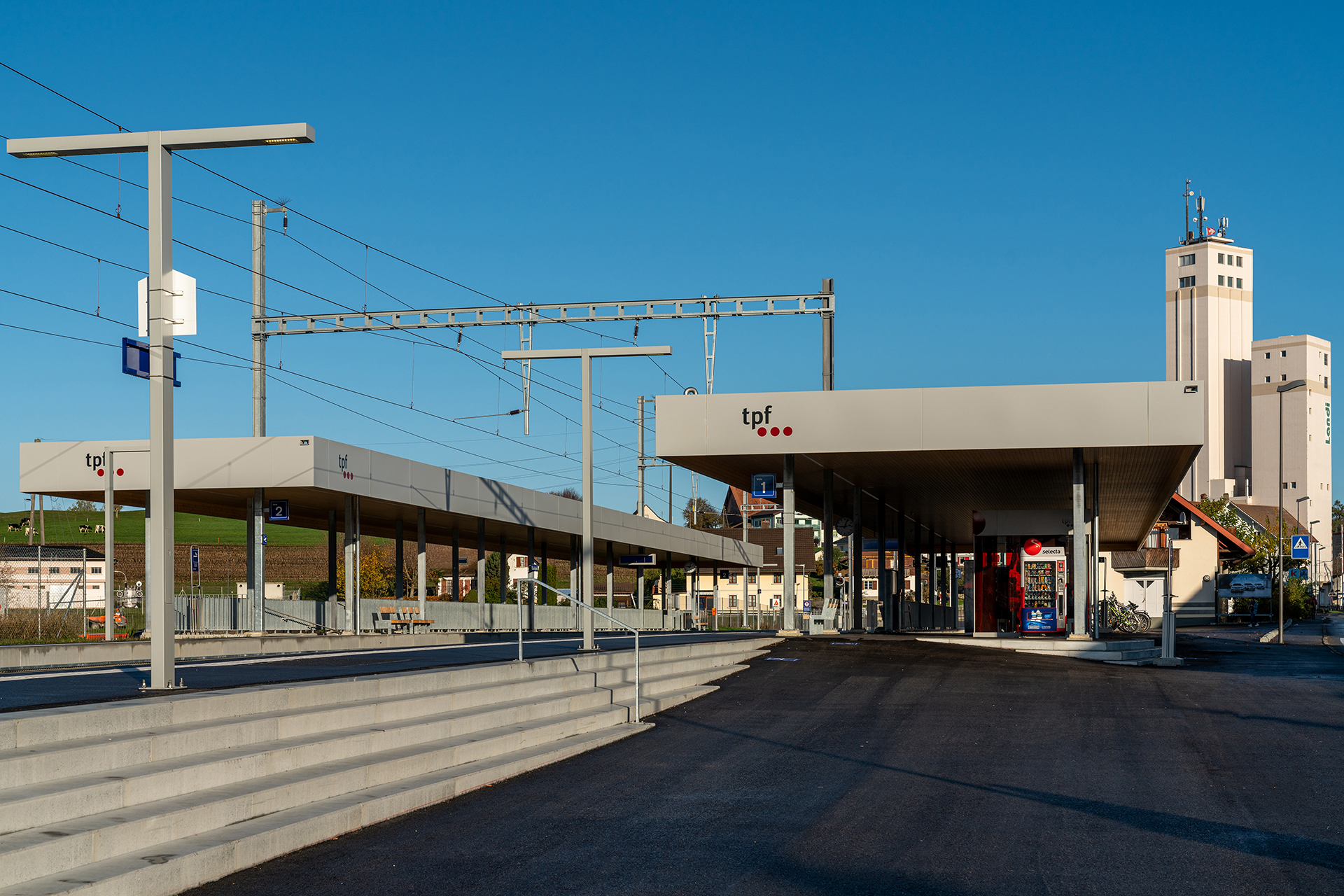
- The station in 2019

General information
- Location: Courtepin; Switzerland
- Coordinates: 46°52′02″N 7°07′22″E
- Elevation: 576 m (1,890 ft)
- Owner: Transports publics Fribourgeois
- Line: Fribourg–Ins line
- Distance: 12.4 km (7.7 mi) from Fribourg/Freiburg
- Platforms: 2 (2 side platforms)
- Tracks: 2
- Train operators: Transports publics Fribourgeois
- Connections: Transports publics Fribourgeois buses

Construction
- Parking: Yes (14 spaces)
- Accessible: Yes

Other information
- Station code: 8504184 (COUR)
- Fare zone: 52 and 53 (frimobil)

Services
Preceding station	RER Fribourg	Following station
Cressier FR towards Neuchâtel	S20	Pensier towards Fribourg/Freiburg
Cressier FR towards Neuchâtel	S21	Pensier towards Fribourg/Freiburg
Location

Courtepin railway station (French: Gare de Courtepin) is a railway station in the municipality of Courtepin, in the Swiss canton of Fribourg. It is an intermediate stop on the standard gauge Fribourg–Ins line of Transports publics Fribourgeois.

== Services ==
As of the December 2024 timetable change, the following services stop at Courtepin:

- RER Fribourg S20 / S21: half-hourly service between Neuchâtel and Fribourg/Freiburg.
