= Cressier FR railway station =

Railway station in Cressier, Canton of Fribourg, Switzerland

Cressier FR
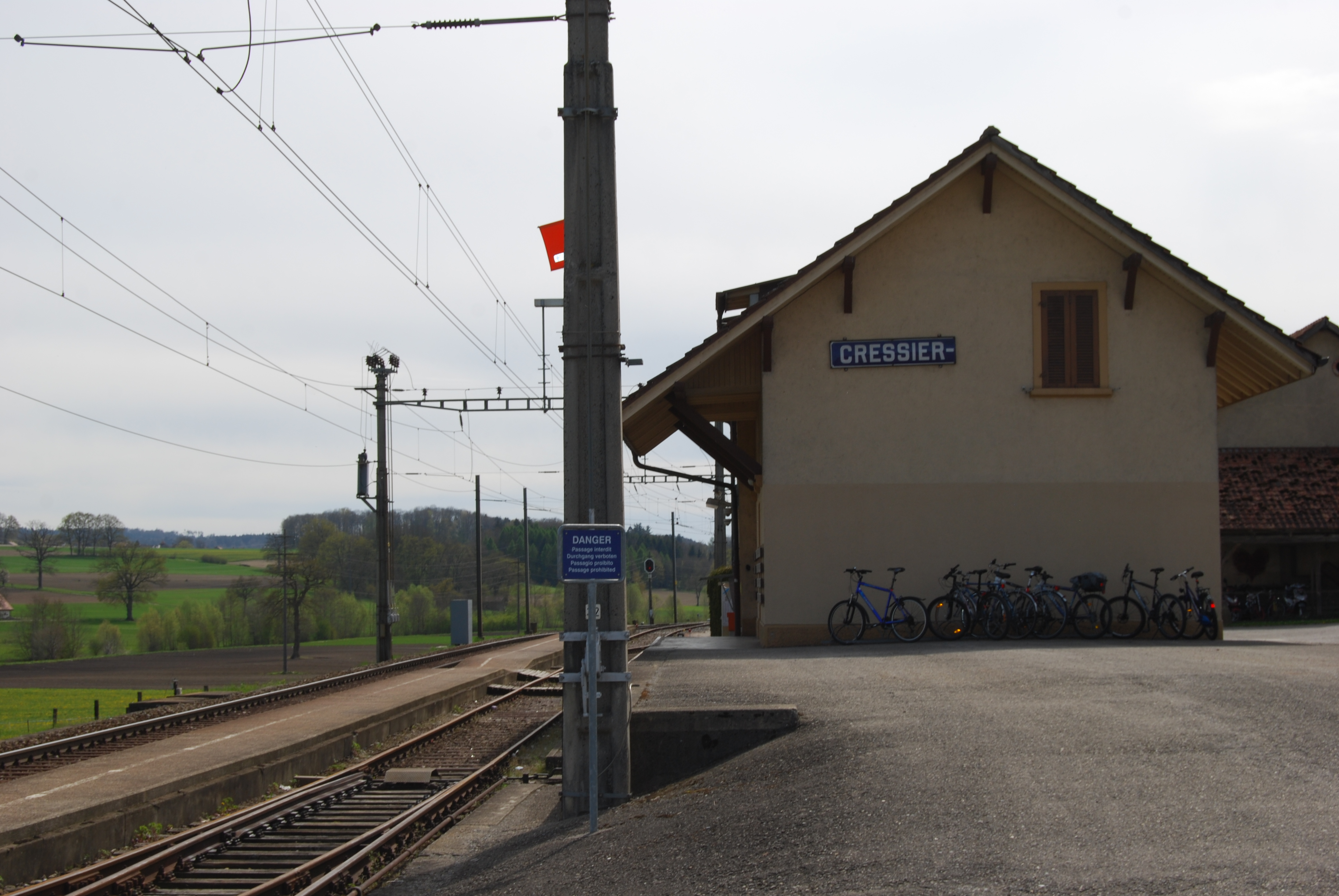
- The station in 2014

General information
- Location: Cressier; Switzerland
- Coordinates: 46°54′01″N 7°08′59″E
- Elevation: 540 m (1,770 ft)
- Owner: Transports publics Fribourgeois
- Line: Fribourg–Ins line
- Distance: 16.9 km (10.5 mi) from Fribourg/Freiburg
- Platforms: 1 (1 side platform)
- Tracks: 1
- Train operators: Transports publics Fribourgeois

Construction
- Parking: Yes (6 spaces)
- Accessible: Yes

Other information
- Station code: 8504185 (CRFR)
- Fare zone: 52 (frimobil)

Services
Preceding station	RER Fribourg	Following station
Münchenwiler-Courgevaux towards Neuchâtel	S20	Courtepin towards Fribourg/Freiburg
Münchenwiler-Courgevaux towards Neuchâtel	S21	Courtepin towards Fribourg/Freiburg
Location

Cressier FR railway station (French: Gare de Cressier FR) is a railway station in the municipality of Cressier, in the Swiss canton of Fribourg. It is an intermediate stop on the standard gauge Fribourg–Ins line of Transports publics Fribourgeois.

== Services ==
As of the December 2024 timetable change, the following services stop at Cressier FR:

- RER Fribourg S20 / S21: half-hourly service between Neuchâtel and Fribourg/Freiburg.
