= Sugiez railway station =

Railway station in Mont-Vully, Switzerland

Sugiez
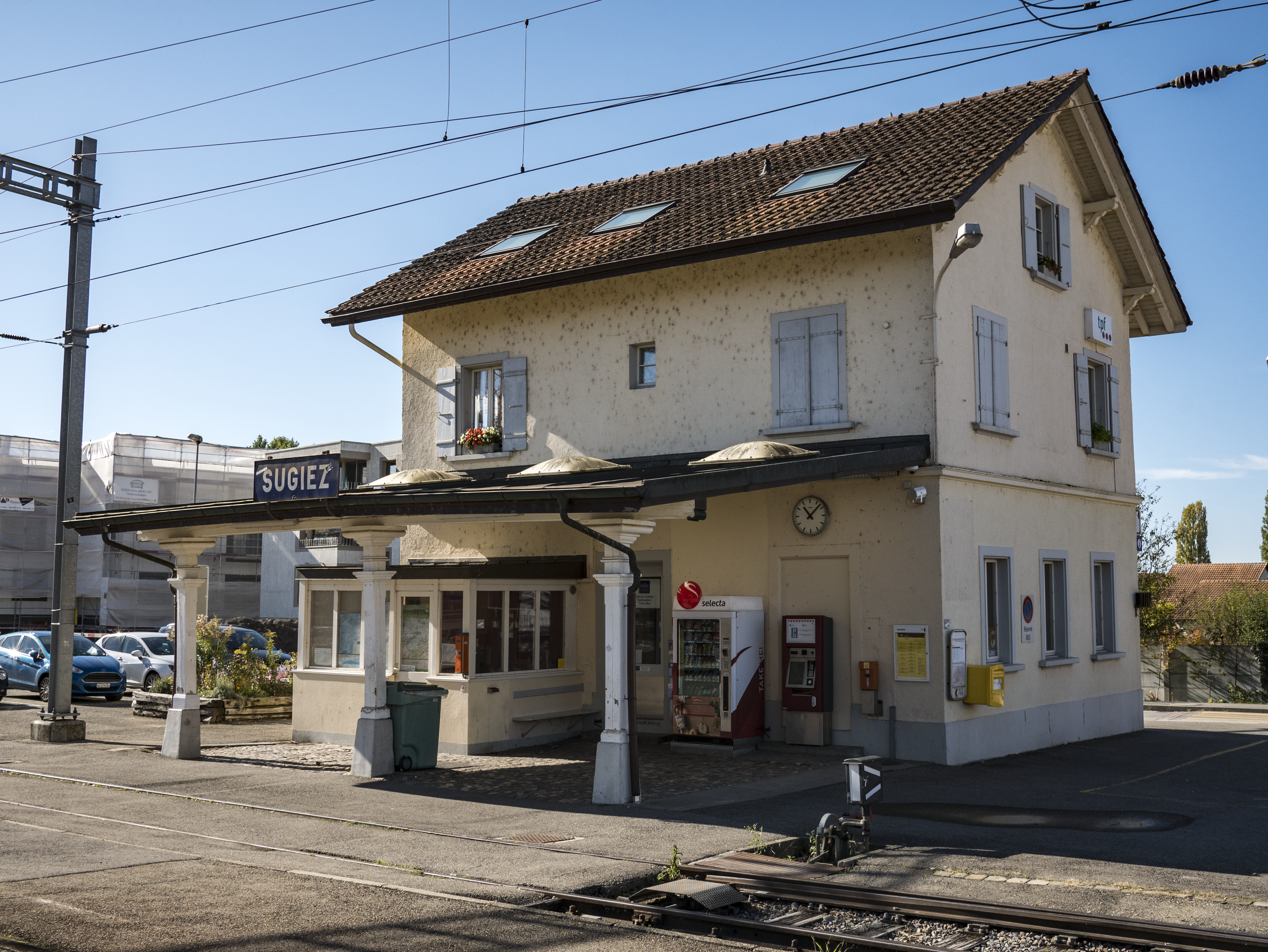
- The station in 2017

General information
- Location: Mont-Vully; Switzerland
- Coordinates: 46°57′51″N 7°07′10″E
- Elevation: 432 m (1,417 ft)
- Owner: Transports publics Fribourgeois
- Line: Fribourg–Ins line
- Distance: 27.8 km (17.3 mi) from Fribourg/Freiburg
- Platforms: 2 side platforms
- Tracks: 3
- Train operators: Transports publics Fribourgeois
- Connections: Transports publics Fribourgeois buses

Construction
- Parking: Yes (10 spaces)
- Accessible: Yes

Other information
- Station code: 8504188 (SUGI)
- Fare zone: 54 (frimobil)

Services
Preceding station	RER Fribourg	Following station
Ins towards Neuchâtel	S20	Murten/Morat towards Fribourg/Freiburg
Ins towards Neuchâtel	S21	Muntelier-Löwenberg towards Fribourg/Freiburg
Location

Sugiez railway station (German: Bahnhof Sugiez, French: Gare de Sugiez) is a railway station in the municipality of Mont-Vully, in the Swiss canton of Fribourg. It is an intermediate stop on the standard gauge Fribourg–Ins line of Transports publics Fribourgeois.

== Services ==
As of the December 2024 timetable change, the following services stop at Sugiez:

- RER Fribourg S20 / S21: half-hourly service between Neuchâtel and Fribourg/Freiburg.
