= Ins railway station =

Railway station in Ins, Switzerland

Ins
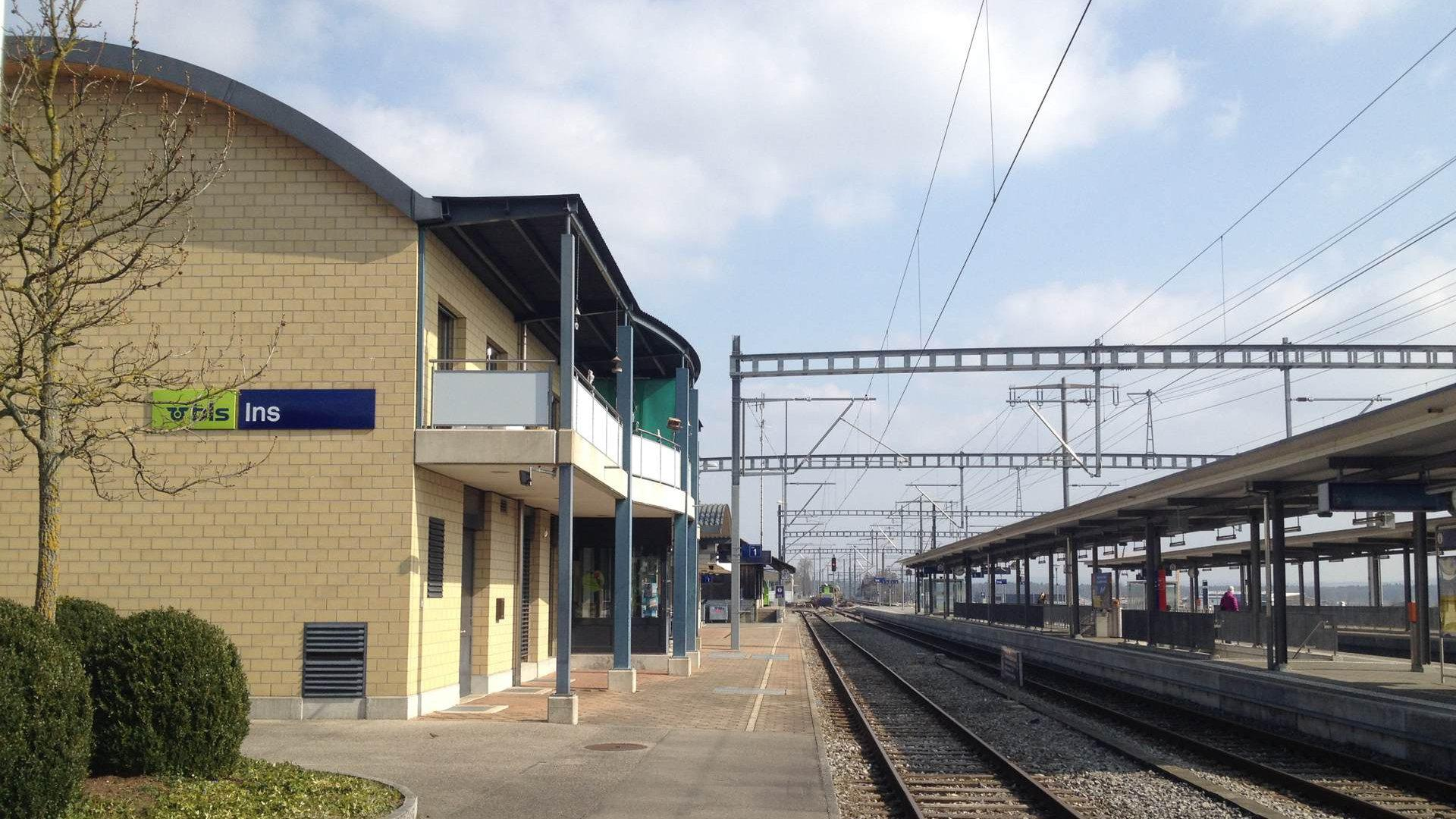
- The station building in 2018

General information
- Location: Ins; Switzerland
- Coordinates: 46°59′59″N 7°05′58″E
- Elevation: 436 m (1,430 ft)
- Owner: BLS AG
- Lines: Bern–Neuchâtel line; Biel–Täuffelen–Ins line; Fribourg–Ins line
- Distance: 32.2 km (20.0 mi) from Fribourg/Freiburg; 29.8 km (18.5 mi) from Bern
- Platforms: 4: 3 side platforms; 1 island platform
- Tracks: 5
- Train operators: Aare Seeland mobil; BLS AG; Transports publics Fribourgeois
- Connections: PostAuto AG buses

Construction
- Parking: Yes (145 spaces)
- Accessible: Yes

Other information
- Station code: 8504483 (INS)
- Fare zone: 55 (frimobil); 696 (Libero)

Passengers
- 2023: 2'600 per weekday (BLS, TPF (excluding asm))

Services
Preceding station	BLS	Following station
Neuchâtel towards La Chaux-de-Fonds	IR 66	Kerzers towards Bern
Marin-Epagnier One-way operation	IR 66 Rush-hour service	Müntschemier towards Bern
Neuchâtel Terminus	IR 66 Rush-hour service	Kerzers One-way operation
Preceding station	RER Fribourg	Following station
Marin-Epagnier towards Neuchâtel	S20	Sugiez towards Fribourg/Freiburg
Marin-Epagnier towards Neuchâtel	S21	Sugiez towards Fribourg/Freiburg
Preceding station	Bern S-Bahn	Following station
Gampelen towards Neuchâtel	S5	Müntschemier towards Bern
Terminus	S52	Müntschemier towards Bern
Preceding station	Aare Seeland mobil	Following station
Terminus	S37	Ins Dorf towards Biel/Bienne
Location

Ins railway station (German: Bahnhof Ins); (French: Gare d'Anet) is a railway station in the municipality of Ins, in the Swiss canton of Bern. It is located at the junction of standard gauge Bern–Neuchâtel line of BLS AG and the standard gauge Fribourg–Ins line of Swiss Federal Railways. Aare Seeland mobil also serves the station on its 1,000 mm (3 ft 3 3/8 in) gauge Biel–Täuffelen–Ins line.

== Services ==
As of the December 2024 timetable change, the following services stop at Ins:

- InterRegio:
  - : hourly service between La Chaux-de-Fonds and Bern.
  - : rush-hour service between Neuchâtel and Bern.
- S37: half-hourly or hourly service to Biel/Bienne.
- RER Fribourg S20 / S21: half-hourly service between Neuchâtel and Fribourg/Freiburg.
- Bern S-Bahn:
  - S5: hourly service between Neuchâtel and Bern.
  - S52: rush-hour service to Bern.
