= Marin-Epagnier railway station =

Railway station in La Tène, Switzerland

Marin-Epagnier
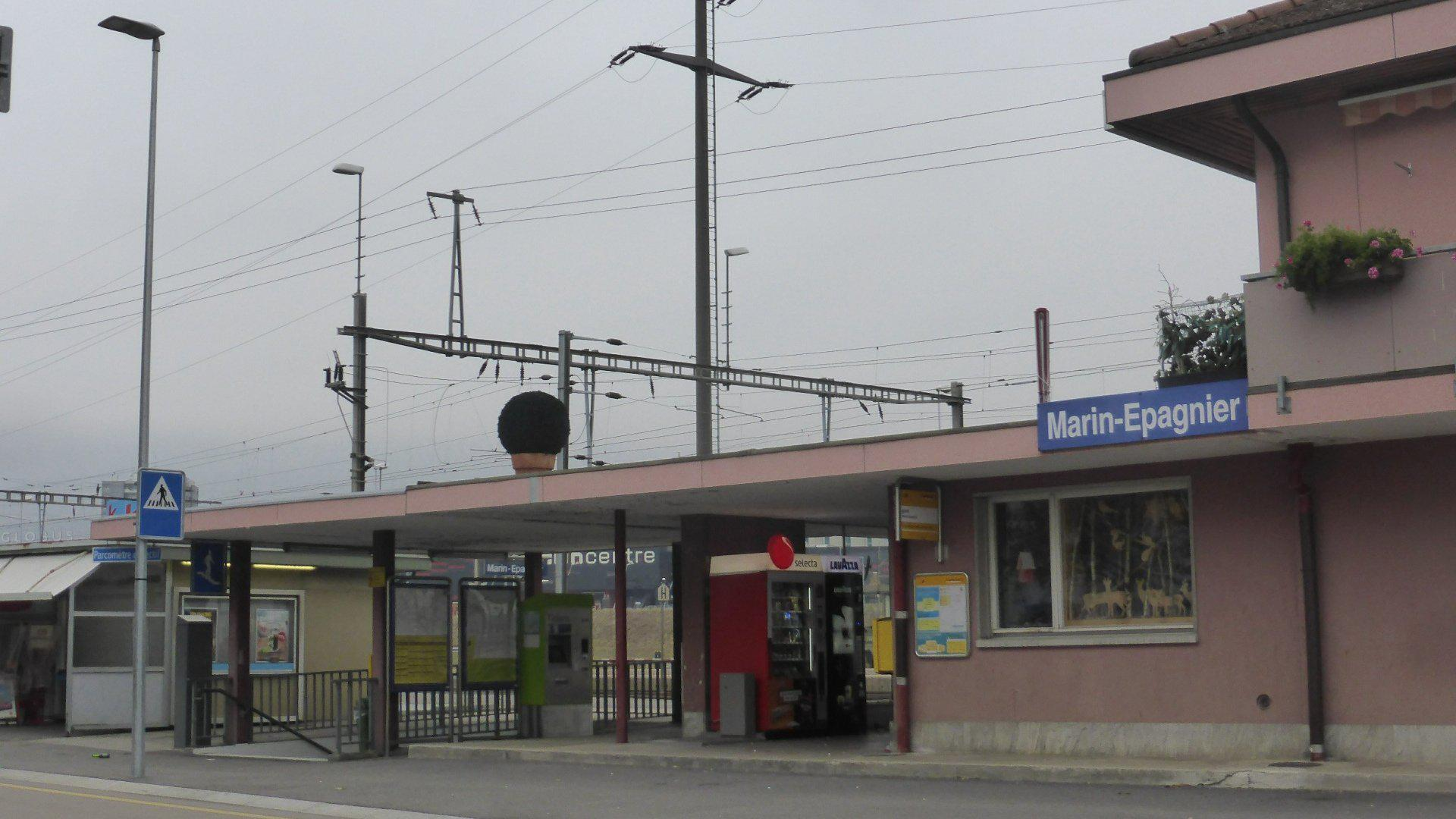
- The station building in 2018

General information
- Location: La Tène; Switzerland
- Coordinates: 47°00′33″N 7°00′38″E
- Elevation: 449 m (1,473 ft)
- Owner: BLS AG
- Line: Bern–Neuchâtel line
- Distance: 36.7 km (22.8 mi) from Bern
- Platforms: 2 (1 island platform)
- Tracks: 4
- Train operators: BLS AG; Transports publics Fribourgeois
- Connections: TN trolleybuses (line 101,107); CarPostal SA

Construction
- Parking: Yes (18 spaces)
- Accessible: No

Other information
- Station code: 8504481 (MEP)
- Fare zone: 11 (Onde Verte)

Passengers
- 2023: 890 per weekday (BLS, TPF)

Services
Preceding station	RER Fribourg	Following station
St-Blaise-Lac towards Neuchâtel	S20	Ins towards Fribourg/Freiburg
Neuchâtel Terminus	S21	Ins towards Fribourg/Freiburg
Preceding station	Bern S-Bahn	Following station
St-Blaise-Lac towards Neuchâtel	S5	Zihlbrücke towards Bern
Preceding station	BLS	Following station
Neuchâtel One-way operation	IR 66 Rush-hour service	Ins towards Bern
Location
- Location within Switzerland Location within Canton of Neuchâtel

Marin-Epagnier railway station (French: Gare de Marin-Epagnier) is a railway station in the municipality of La Tène, in the Swiss canton of Neuchâtel. It is an intermediate stop on the standard gauge Bern–Neuchâtel line of BLS AG.

== Services ==
As of the December 2024 timetable change, the following services stop at Marin-Epagnier:

- RER Fribourg S20 / S21: half-hourly service between Neuchâtel and Fribourg/Freiburg.
- Bern S-Bahn S5: hourly service between Neuchâtel and Bern.
- InterRegio:
  - : daily rush-hour service to Bern.
