= St-Blaise-Lac railway station =

Railway station in Saint-Blaise, Switzerland

St-Blaise-Lac
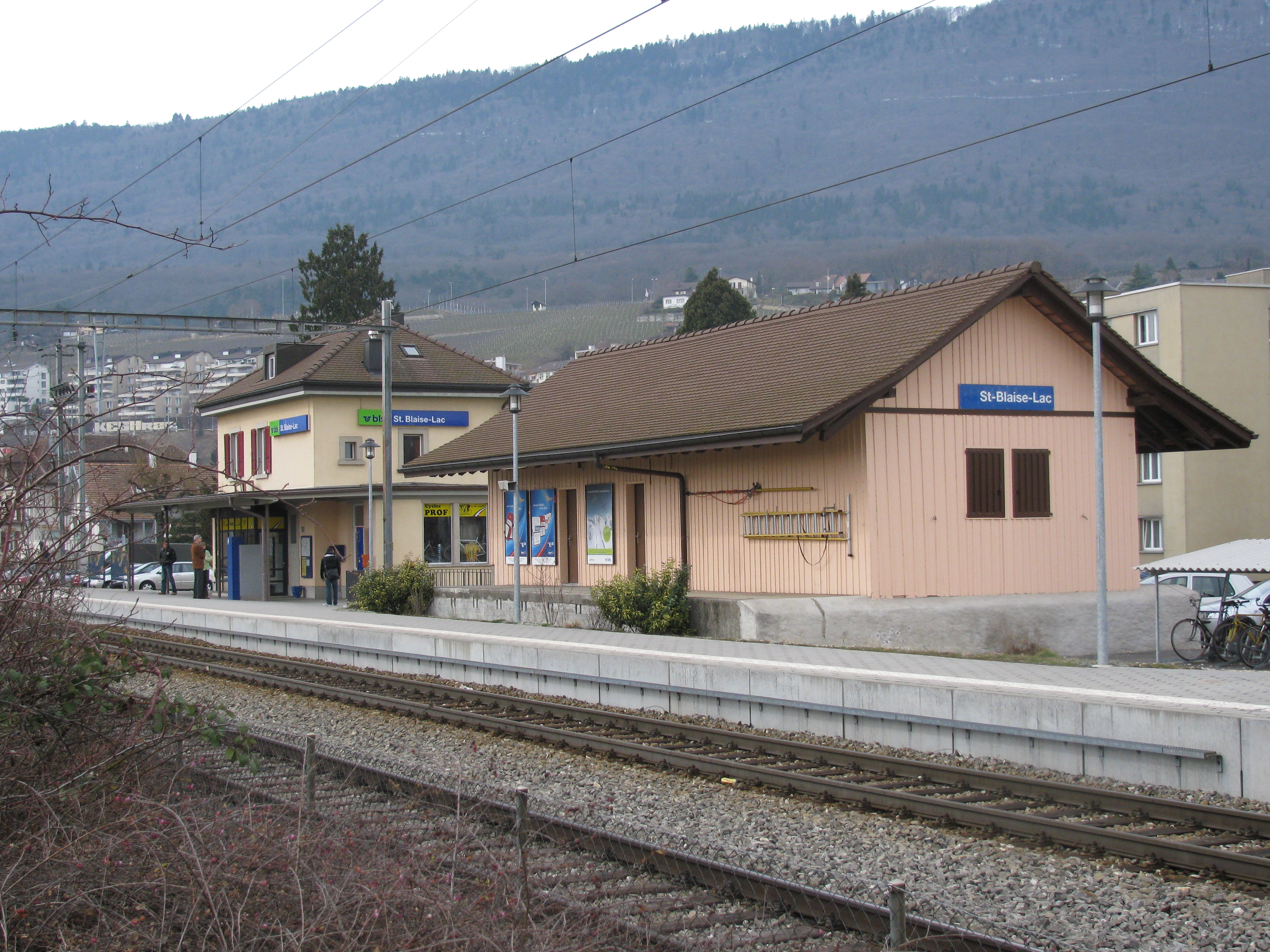
- The station building in 2009

General information
- Location: Saint-Blaise; Switzerland
- Coordinates: 47°00′44″N 6°59′05″E
- Elevation: 432 m (1,417 ft)
- Owner: BLS AG
- Line: Bern–Neuchâtel line
- Distance: 38.7 km (24.0 mi) from Bern
- Platforms: 1 side platform
- Tracks: 2
- Train operators: BLS AG; Transports publics Fribourgeois
- Connections: TN trolleybuses (line 101,107); CarPostal SA

Construction
- Parking: Yes
- Accessible: Yes

Other information
- Station code: 8504480 (SBLB)
- Fare zone: 11 (Onde Verte)

History
- Former names: St-Blaise BN

Passengers
- 2023: 600 per weekday (BLS, TPF)

Services
Preceding station	RER Fribourg	Following station
Neuchâtel Terminus	S20	Marin-Epagnier towards Fribourg/Freiburg
Preceding station	Bern S-Bahn	Following station
Neuchâtel Terminus	S5	Marin-Epagnier towards Bern
Location
- Location within Switzerland Location within Canton of Neuchâtel

St-Blaise-Lac railway station (French: Gare de St-Blaise-Lac; previously "St-Blaise BN") is a railway station in the municipality of Saint-Blaise, in the Swiss canton of Neuchâtel. It is an intermediate stop on the standard gauge Bern–Neuchâtel line of BLS AG. The station is 500 metres (1,600 ft) from St-Blaise CFF on the Jura Foot line of Swiss Federal Railways.

== Services ==
As of the December 2024 timetable change, the following services stop at St-Blaise-Lac:

- RER Fribourg S20 / Bern S-Bahn S5: half-hourly service to Neuchâtel and hourly service to Fribourg/Freiburg and Bern.

== Gallery ==
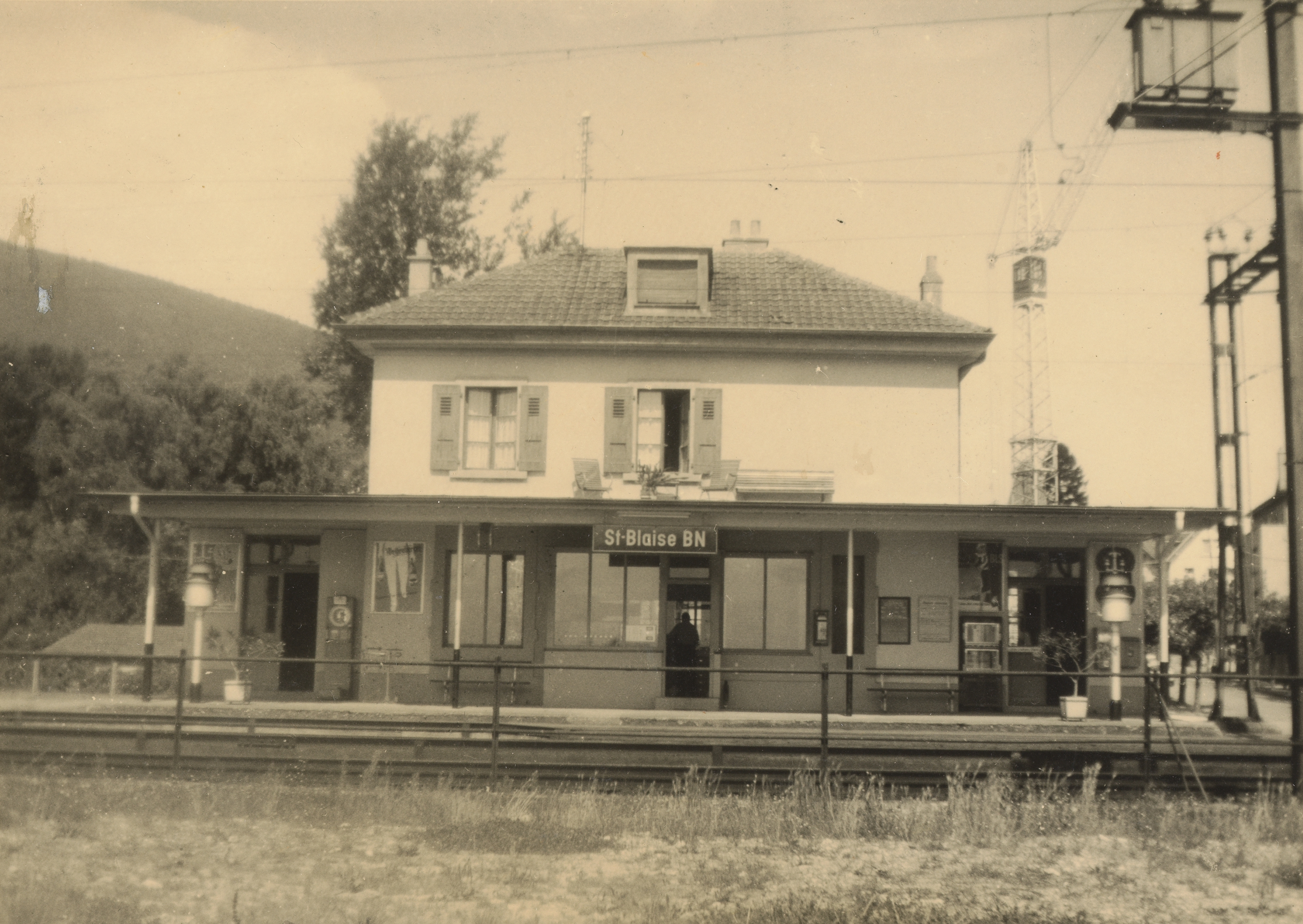
station building (ca. 1960)

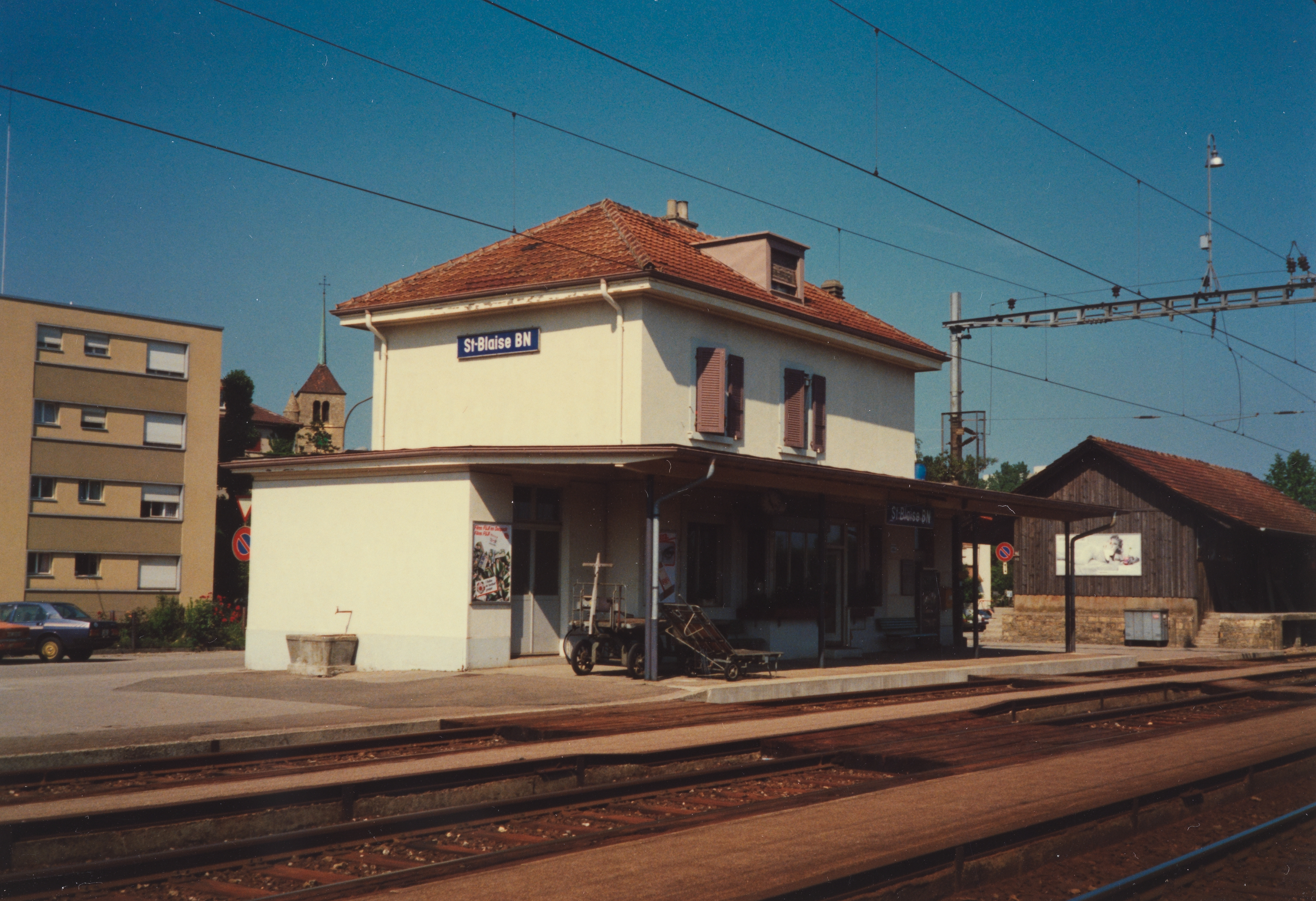
station building (ca. 1980)
