= Belfaux CFF railway station =

Railway station in Belfaux, Switzerland

Belfaux CFF
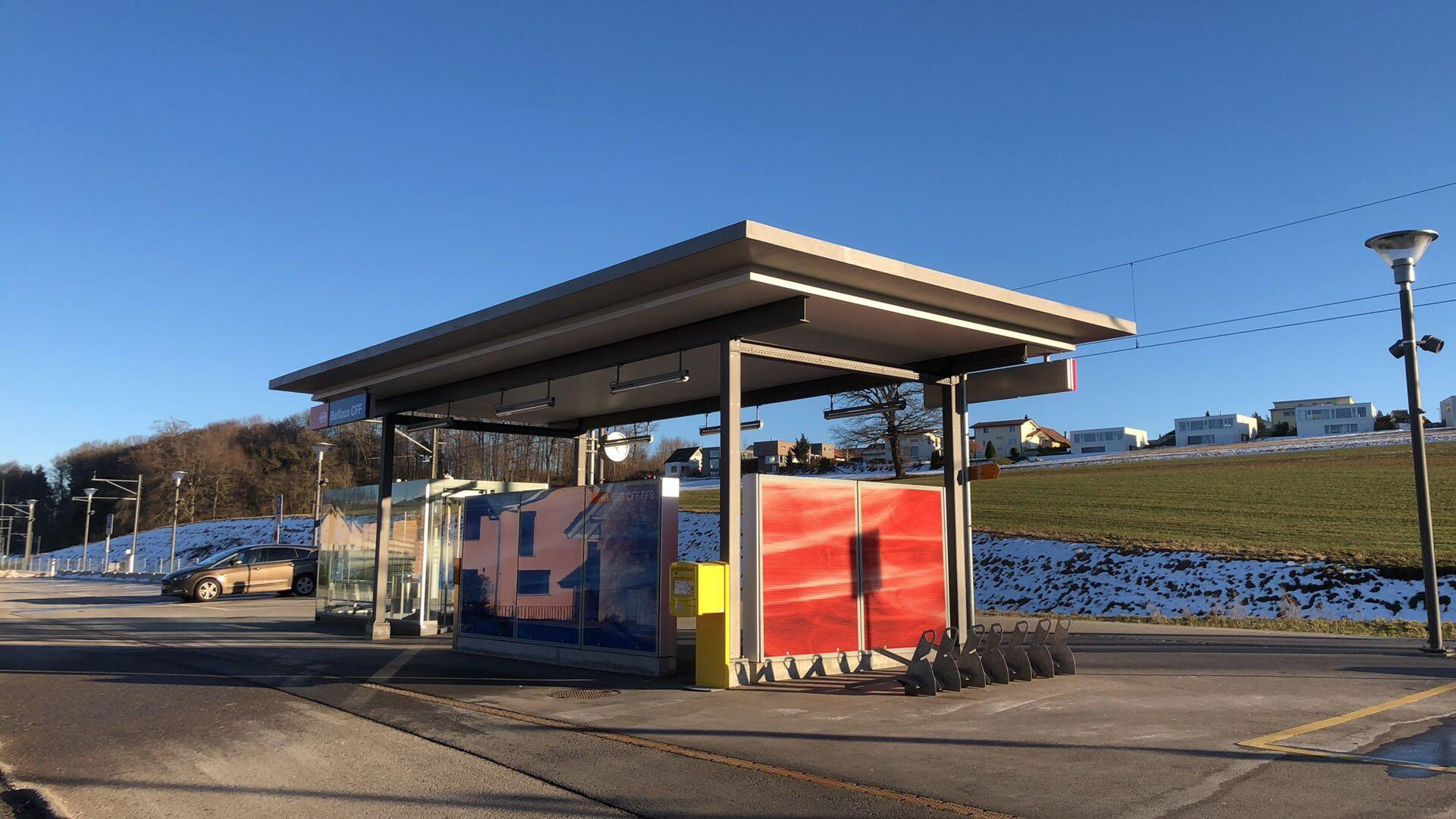
- The station in 2019

General information
- Location: Belfaux; Switzerland
- Coordinates: 46°49′01″N 7°06′22″E
- Elevation: 612 m (2,008 ft)
- Owner: Swiss Federal Railways
- Line: Fribourg–Yverdon line
- Distance: 44.5 km (27.7 mi) from Yverdon-les-Bains
- Platforms: 1 (1 side platform)
- Tracks: 1
- Train operators: Swiss Federal Railways
- Connections: Transports publics Fribourgeois buses

Construction
- Parking: Yes (20 spaces)
- Cycle facilities: Yes (14 spaces)
- Accessible: Yes

Other information
- Station code: 8504139 (BF)
- Fare zone: 11 (frimobil)

Passengers
- 2023: 680 per weekday (SBB)

Services
| Preceding station | RER Fribourg | Following station |
|---|---|---|
| Grolley towards Yverdon-les-Bains | S30 | Givisiez towards Fribourg/Freiburg |
| Grolley towards Yverdon-les-Bains | S30 | Givisiez towards Fribourg/Freiburg |
Location

Belfaux CFF railway station (French: Gare de Belfaux CFF) is a railway station in the municipality of Belfaux, in the Swiss canton of Fribourg. It is an intermediate stop on the standard gauge Fribourg–Yverdon line of Swiss Federal Railways. The station is 750 metres (2,460 ft) south of Belfaux-Village on the Fribourg–Ins line.

== Services ==
As of the December 2024 timetable change, the following services stop at Belfaux CFF:

- RER Fribourg S30 S30: half-hourly service between Yverdon-les-Bains and Fribourg/Freiburg.
