= Zihlbrücke railway station =

Railway station in Gampelen, Switzerland

Zihlbrücke
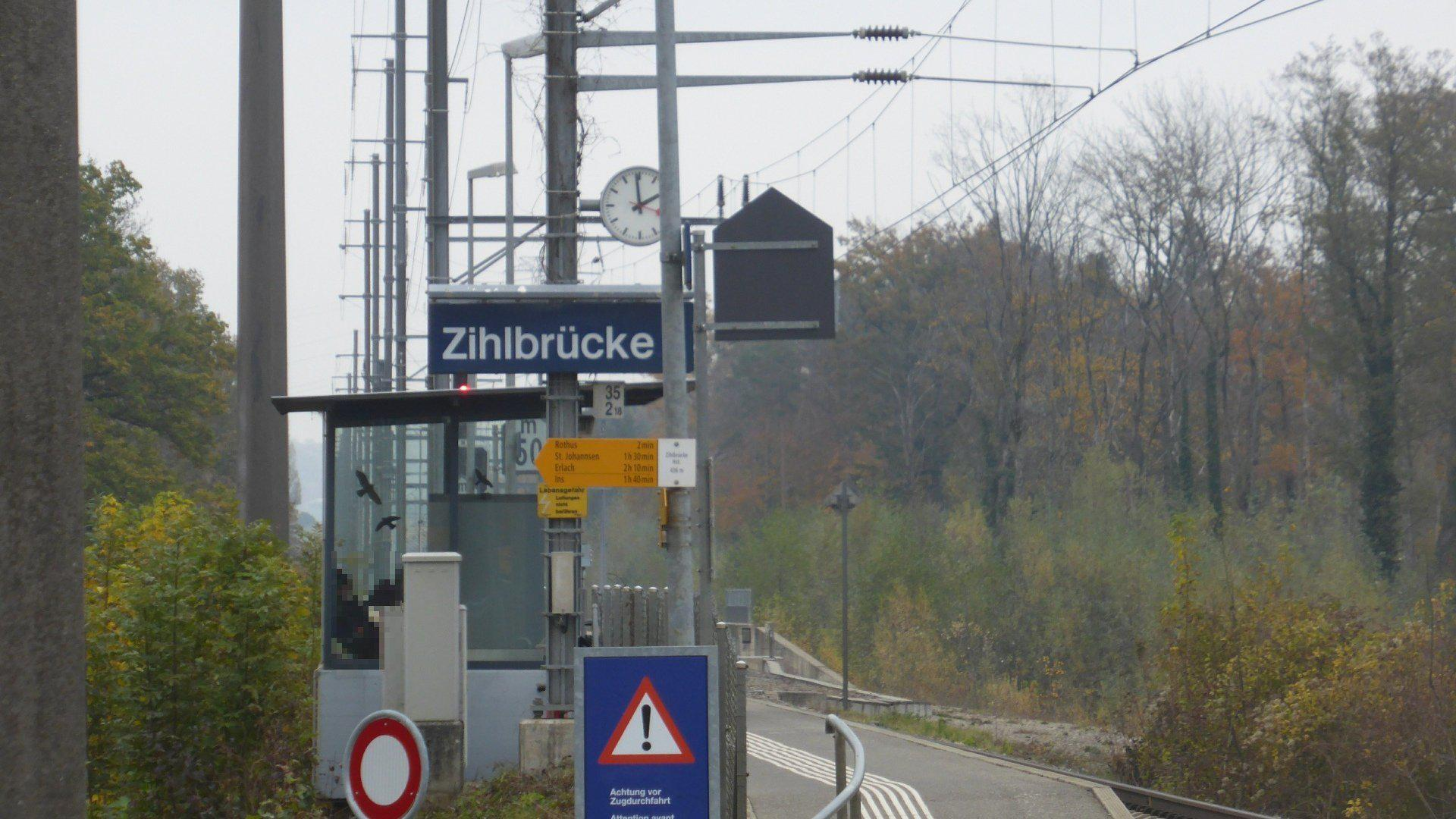
- The station platform in 2018

General information
- Location: Gampelen; Switzerland
- Coordinates: 47°00′33″N 7°01′50″E
- Elevation: 435 m (1,427 ft)
- Owner: BLS AG
- Line: Bern–Neuchâtel line
- Distance: 35.2 km (21.9 mi) from Bern
- Platforms: 1 side platform
- Tracks: 1
- Train operators: BLS AG

Construction
- Accessible: Partly

Other information
- Station code: 8504490 (ZBR)
- Fare zone: 313 (Libero); 11 (Onde Verte)

Passengers
- 2023: 80 per weekday (BLS, TPF)

Services
| Preceding station | Bern S-Bahn | Following station |
|---|---|---|
| Marin-Epagnier towards Neuchâtel | S5 | Gampelen towards Bern |
Location

Zihlbrücke railway station (German: Bahnhof Zihlbrücke) is a railway station in the municipality of Gampelen, in the Swiss canton of Bern. It is an intermediate stop serving as a request stop on the standard gauge Bern–Neuchâtel line of BLS AG. The station takes its name from the river Thielle (German: Zihl) which the railway line crosses into the Canton of Neuchâtel immediately to the west.

== Services ==
The following services stop at Zihlbrücke:

- Bern S-Bahn S5: hourly service between Bern and Neuchâtel.
