= Müntschemier railway station =

Railway station in Müntschemier, Switzerland

Müntschemier
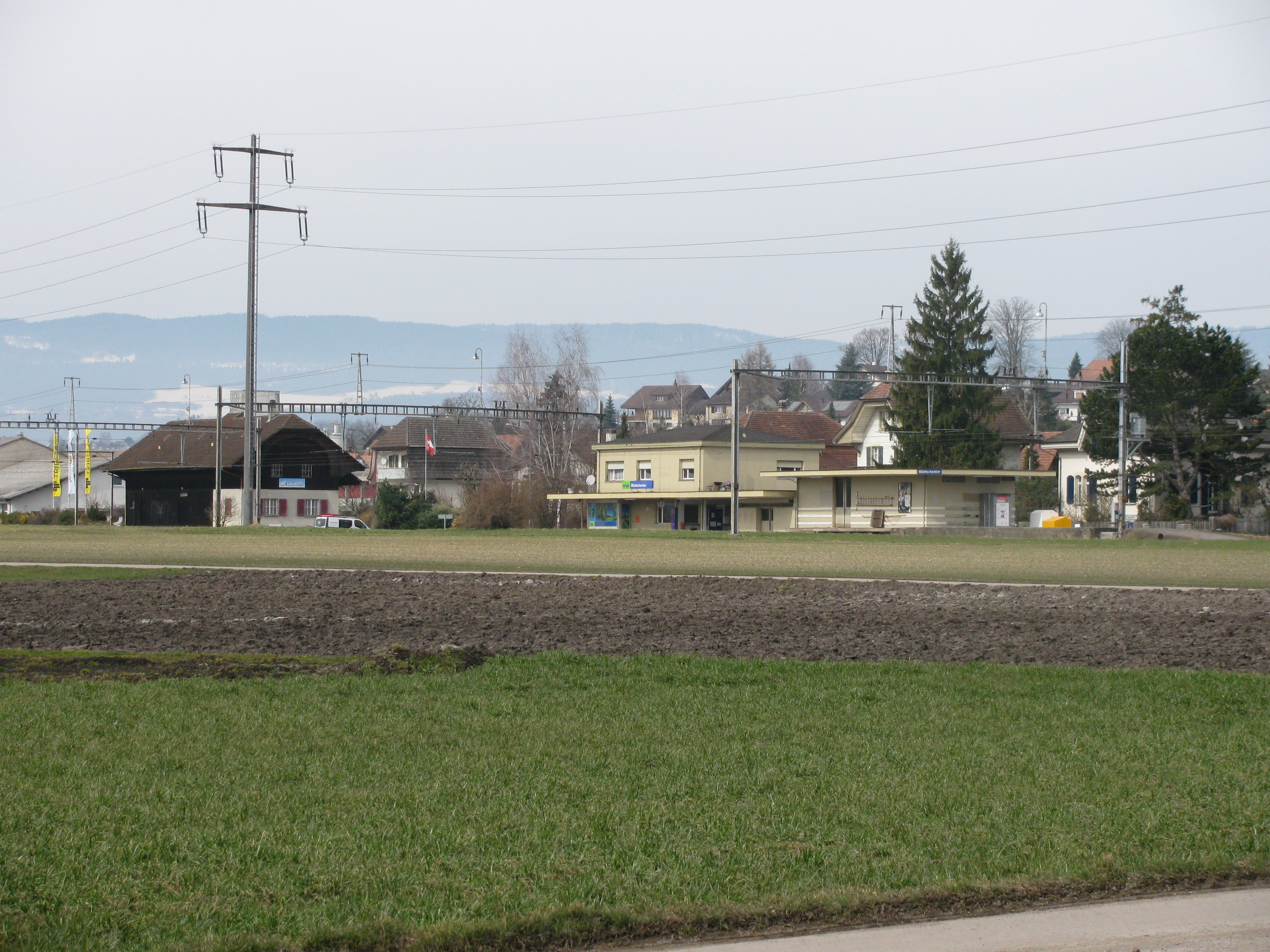
- The station building in 2009

General information
- Location: Müntschemier; Switzerland
- Coordinates: 46°59′36″N 7°08′33″E
- Elevation: 435 m (1,427 ft)
- Owner: BLS AG
- Line: Bern–Neuchâtel line
- Distance: 26.4 km (16.4 mi) from Bern
- Platforms: 2 side platforms
- Tracks: 2
- Train operators: BLS AG

Construction
- Parking: Yes (10 spaces)
- Accessible: Yes

Other information
- Station code: 8504484 (MM)
- Fare zone: 696 (Libero)

Passengers
- 2023: 310 per weekday (BLS)

Services
Preceding station	Bern S-Bahn	Following station
Ins towards Neuchâtel	S5	Kerzers towards Bern
Ins Terminus	S52 Limited service	Kerzers towards Bern
Preceding station	BLS	Following station
Ins One-way operation	IR 66 Rush-hour service	Kerzers towards Bern
Location

Müntschemier railway station (German: Bahnhof Müntschemier) is a railway station in the municipality of Müntschemier, in the Swiss canton of Bern. It is an intermediate stop on the standard gauge Bern–Neuchâtel line of BLS AG.

== Services ==
As of the December 2024 timetable change, the following services stop at Müntschemier:

- Bern S-Bahn:
  - S5: hourly service between Bern and Neuchâtel.
  - S52: rush-hour service between Bern and Ins.
- InterRegio:
  - : daily morning rush-hour service on weekdays to Bern.
