= Freiburg railway station =

Freiburg railway station could refer to:

- Freiburg Hauptbahnhof in Freiburg im Breisgau, Germany
- Fribourg/Freiburg railway station in Fribourg, Switzerland
