= St-Blaise CFF railway station =

Railway station in Saint-Blaise, Switzerland

St-Blaise CFF

General information
- Location: Saint-Blaise; Switzerland
- Coordinates: 47°00′52″N 6°58′56″E
- Elevation: 463 m (1,519 ft)
- Owner: Swiss Federal Railways
- Line: Jura Foot line
- Distance: 79.4 km (49.3 mi) from Lausanne
- Platforms: 2 side platforms
- Tracks: 2
- Train operators: Swiss Federal Railways
- Connections: CarPostal SA bus line

Construction
- Parking: Yes (45 spaces)
- Cycle facilities: Yes (8 spaces)
- Accessible: No

Other information
- Station code: 8504222 (SBL)
- Fare zone: 11 (Onde Verte)

Passengers
- 2023: 520 per weekday (SBB)

Services
| Preceding station | SBB CFF FFS | Following station |
|---|---|---|
| Neuchâtel towards Yverdon-les-Bains | R13 | Cornaux NE towards Biel/Bienne |
| Neuchâtel Terminus | R16 | Cornaux NE towards Biel/Bienne |
Location
- Location within Switzerland Location within Canton of Neuchâtel

St-Blaise CFF railway station (French: Gare de St-Blaise CFF) is a railway station in the municipality of Saint-Blaise, in the Swiss canton of Neuchâtel. It is an intermediate stop on the standard gauge Jura Foot line of Swiss Federal Railways. The station is 500 metres (1,600 ft) from St-Blaise-Lac on the Bern–Neuchâtel line of BLS AG.

== Services ==
As of the December 2024 timetable change, the following services stop at St-Blaise CFF:

- Regio:
  - hourly service between Biel/Bienne and Yverdon-les-Bains.
  - hourly service between Biel/Bienne and Neuchâtel at various times during the day.

== Gallery ==
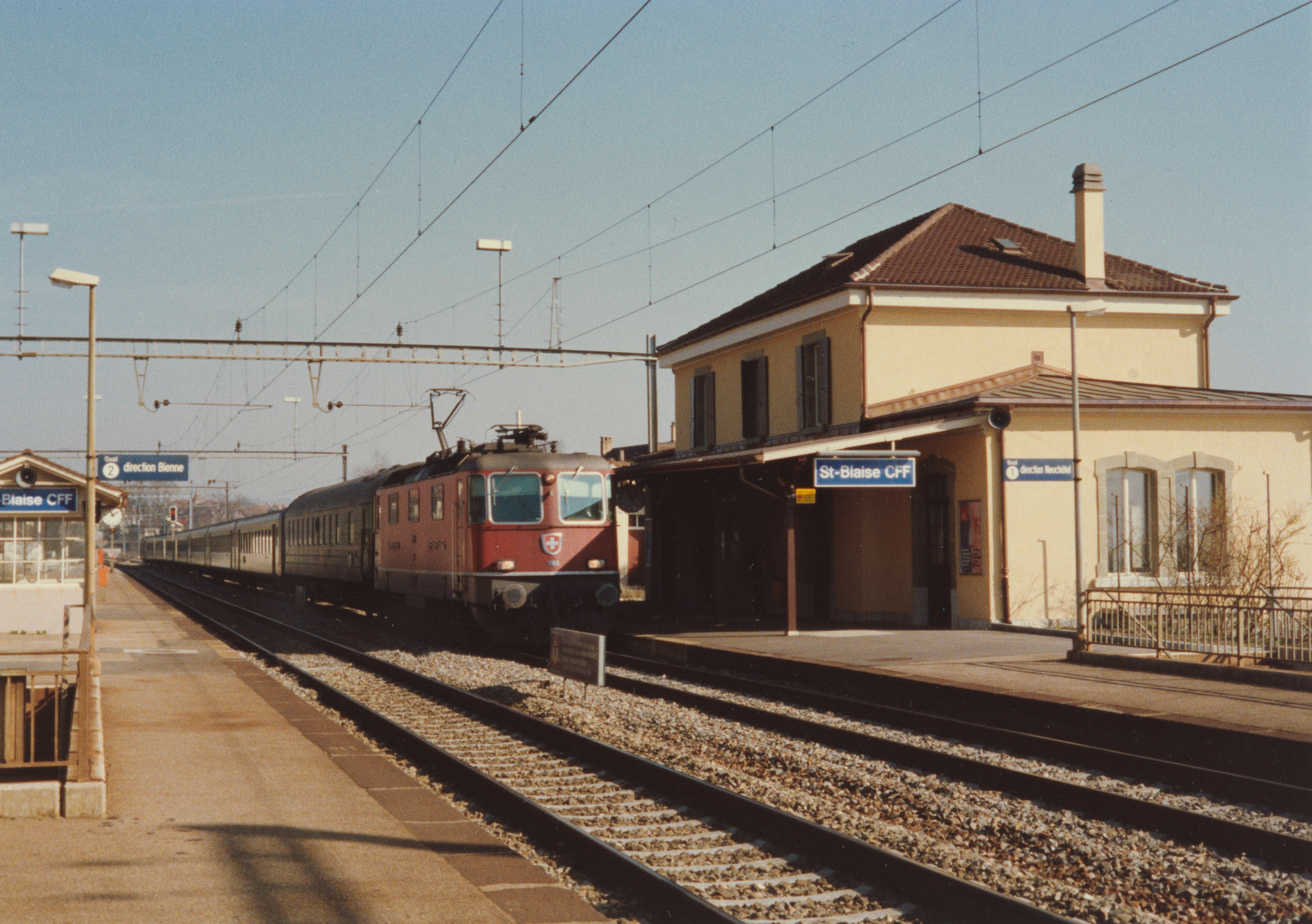
station building (unknown date)

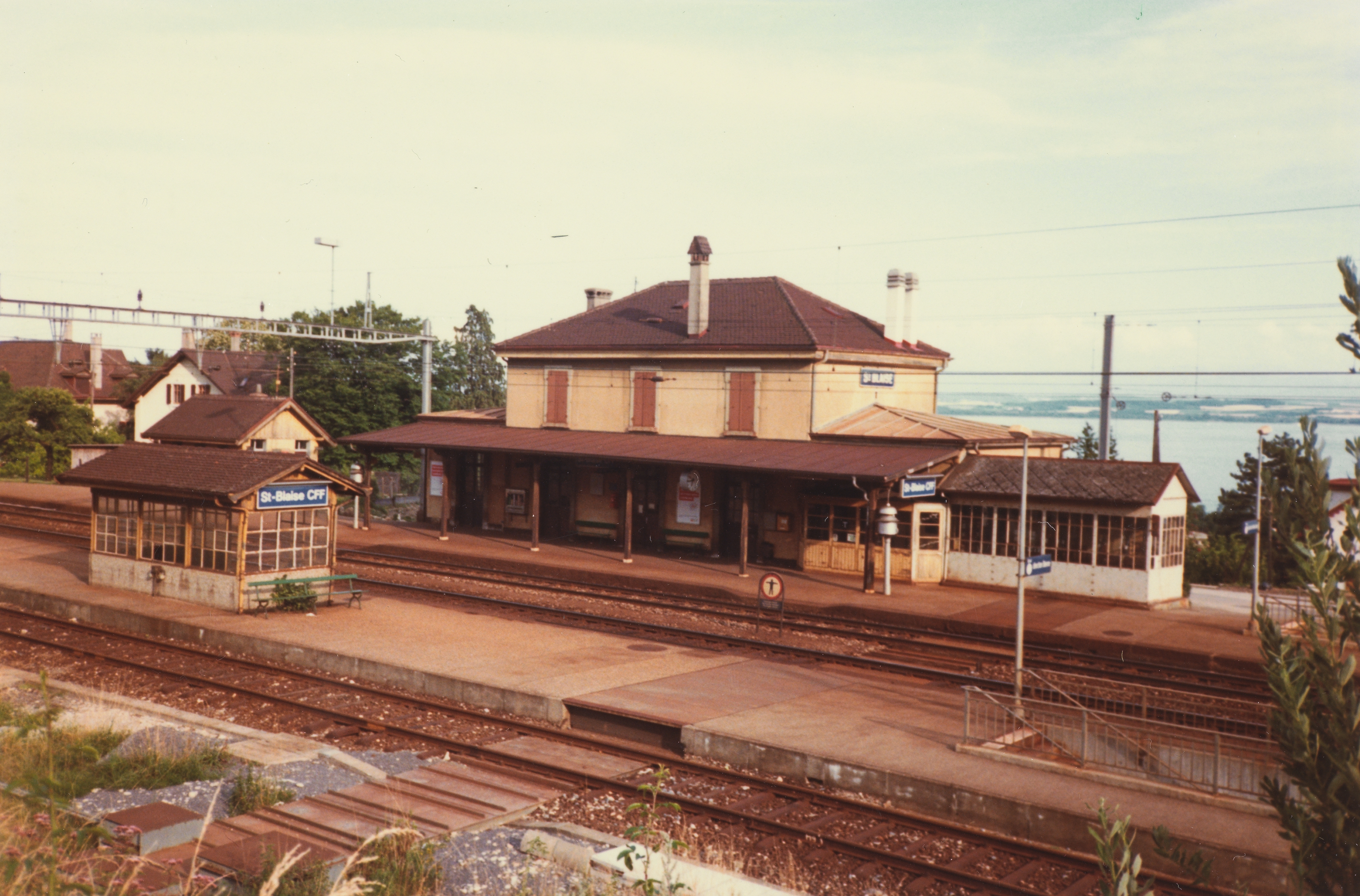
Station building with the later removed switch box

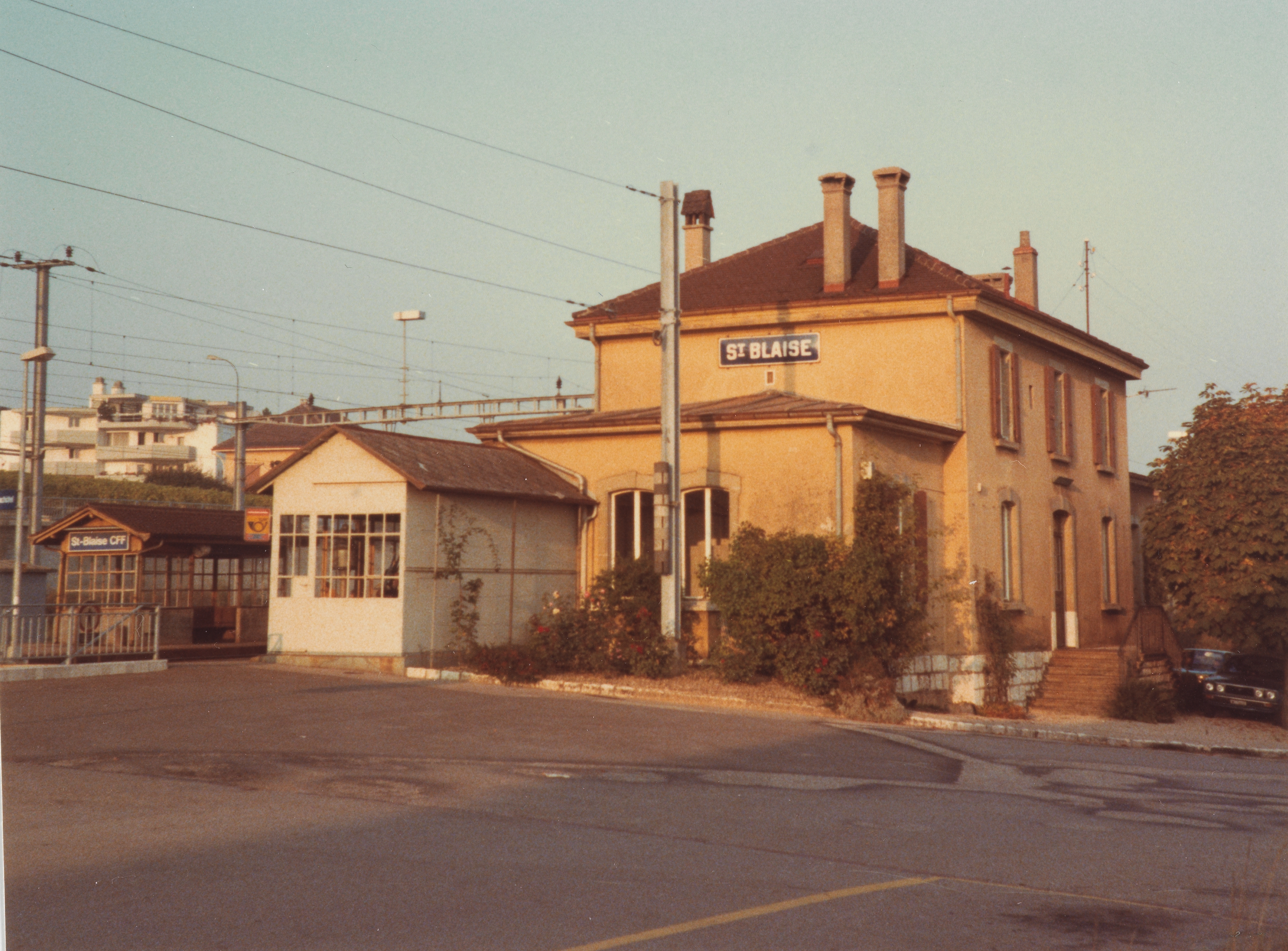
street side view
