= Biel–Täuffelen–Ins railway line =

Railway line in Switzerland

Biel-Täuffelen-Ins
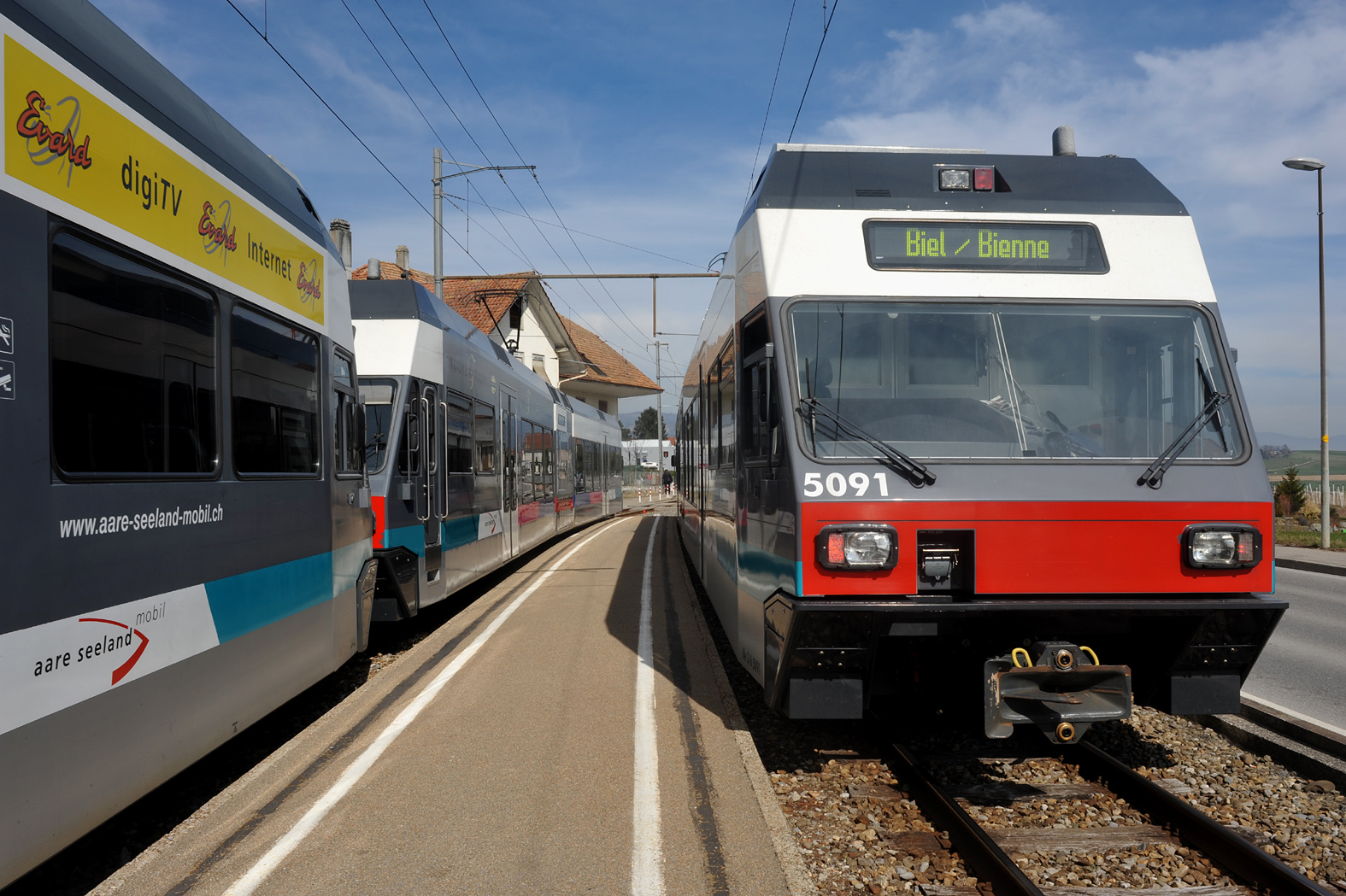
- Biel–Täuffelen–Ins railway

Overview
- Owner: Aare Seeland mobil
- Line number: 290
- Termini: Biel/Bienne; Ins

Technical
- Line length: 21.19 km (13.17 mi)
- Number of tracks: 1
- Track gauge: 1,000 mm (3 ft 3 3/8 in) metre gauge
- Electrification: 1,200 V DC
- Maximum incline: 4.8%

The Biel–Täuffelen–Ins railway line is a railway line in Switzerland that runs from Biel/Bienne to Ins along the east side of the Lake Biel. The line is owned and operated by Aare Seeland mobil (ASm).

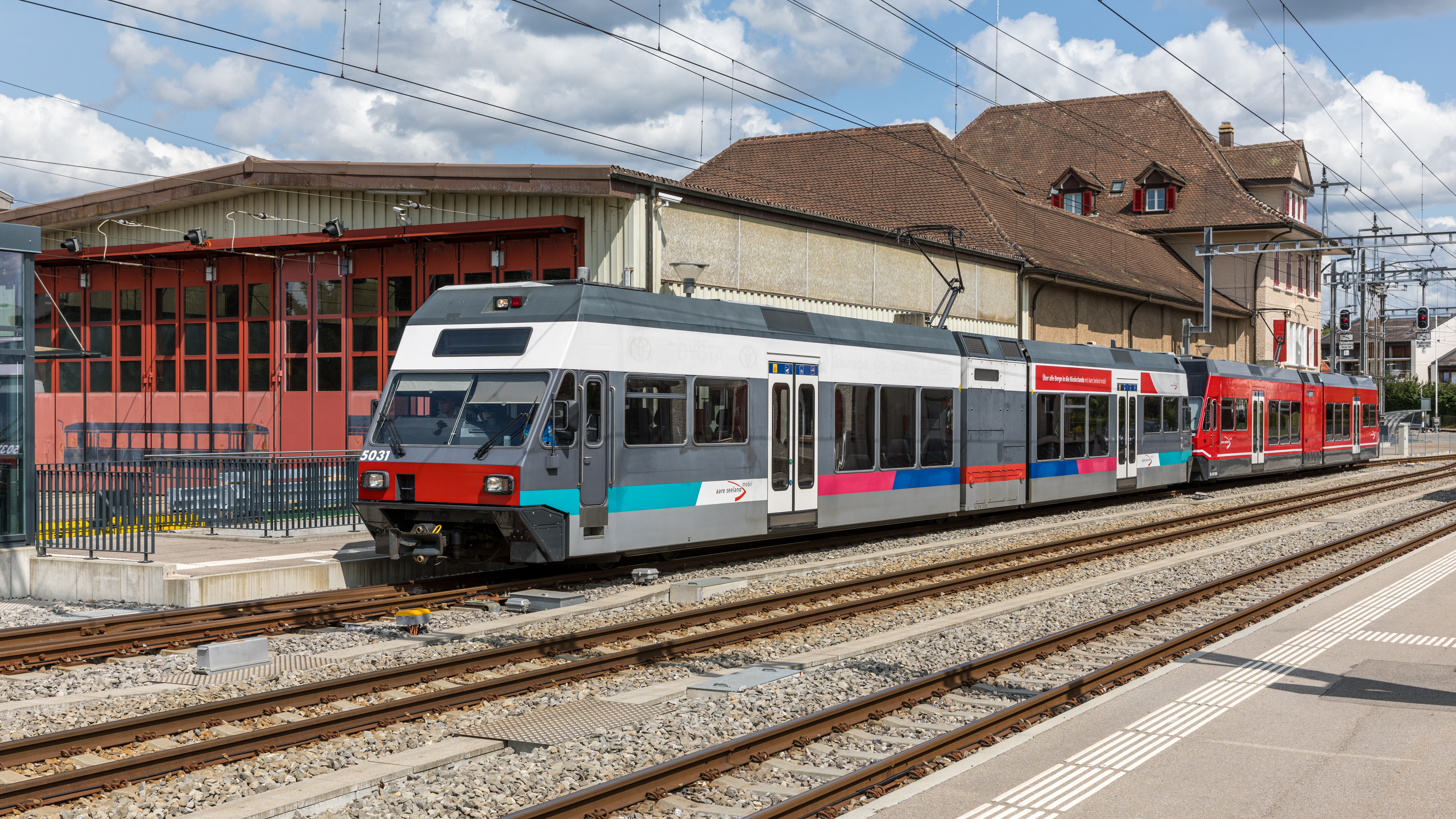
Täuffelen railway station: ASm Be 2/6 in front of the rolling stock depot and service building

== History ==
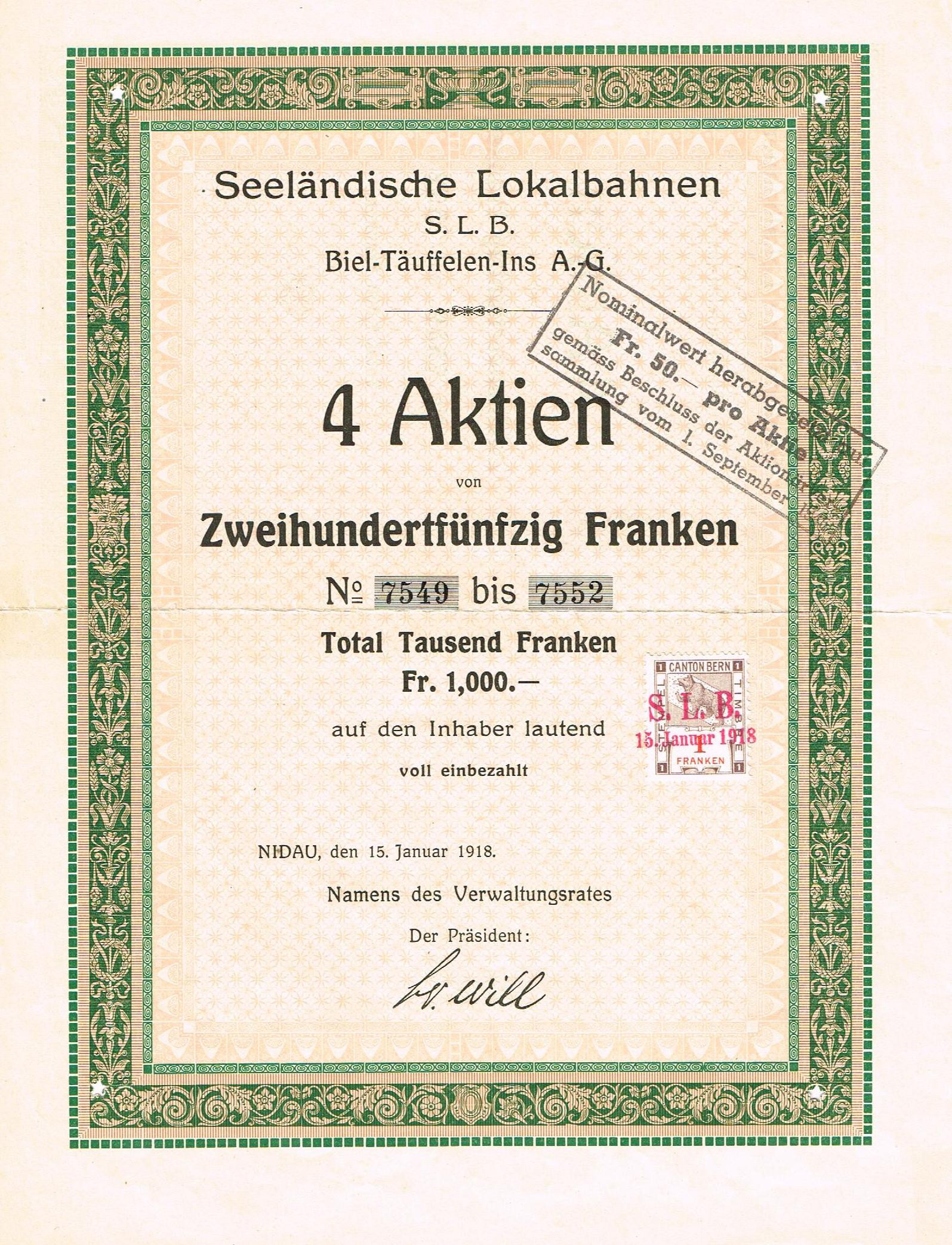
Certificate for 4 shares worth 250 francs each in the Seeländische Lokalbahnen, issued on 15 January 1918

The line was originally built by Seeländische Lokalbahnen (SLB), which was founded in 1912 with its headquarters in Täuffelen. The first section of the line from Nidau to Siselen was opened on 4 December 1916 and the section from Siselen to Ins followed on 19 March 1917. Since the line ends in Ins next to the standard-gauge line of the Bern–Neuchâtel railway (BN), a transporter wagon yard was opened at the same time for the carriage of standard gauge freight cars on the metre-gauge line. The line was electrified at 1200 V DC from construction.

The last section between Nidau and the Biel/Bienne station forecourt (Bahnhofplatz) followed on 21 August 1926. A transporter wagon system was opened here, too; wagon could be delivered to any point on the whole line.

The Biel–Täuffelen–Ins line remained the only line of the Seeländische Lokalbahnen.

The Seeländische Lokalbahnen was renamed the Biel-Täuffelen-Ins Railway (German: Biel-Täuffelen-Ins-Bahn, BTI) as of 1 September 1945. The cooperation between the Oberaargau-Jura railway (Oberaargau-Jura-Bahnen, OJB) and the Solothurn-Niederbipp Railway (Solothurn-Niederbipp-Bahn, SNB), which had existed for some time, was regulated by contract from 1960.

The new underground approach of the Biel-Täuffelen-Ins line to Biel/Bienne station was opened on 22 May 1975. This allowed the dismantling of the line that had run along streets under the large SBB railway bridge to Biel station forecourt. The underground station reduced the distance to the Swiss Federal Railways (SBB) trains and the station forecourt was cleared, allowing it to be rebuilt.

An early indication of the later merger was a formal agreement that was contracted on 5 April 1984 between the BTI, the OJB, the SNB, the Oberaargauischen Automobilkurse (a bus company; OAK), the Ligerz-Tessenberg-Bahn (a funicular railway; LTB) and the Bielersee-Schiffahrts-Gesellschaft (Lake Biel Ferry Company; BSG) under the name of Oberaargau-Solothurn-Seeland-Transport (OSST).

The first of seven low-floor GTW Be 2/6 articulated railcars was put into operation in 1997.

The majority of the participants of Oberaargau-Solothurn-Seeland-Transport were merged to form Aare Seeland mobil (ASm) in 1999. The Ligerz-Tessenberg-Bahn joined only in 2003, while the Bielersee-Schiffahrts-Gesellschaft still remains legally independent.

== Route ==
The line runs largely on its own right of way, although the line runs for a few hundred metres on public roads. The steepest section at 4.7 percent is located between the stations of Ins and Ins Dorf.

The BTI ends under Biel SBB station, which is the hub of four SBB lines. The Biel–Grenchen–Solothurn–Olten and Biel–Neuchâtel–Yverdon-les-Bains–Lausanne lines together form the line known as the Jura Foot Railway. The Biel/Bienne–Bern and the Biel/Bienne–La Chaux-de-Fonds lines also connect at the station.

== RegioTram planning ==
There is a Regiotram agglomeration Biel/Bienne project, in which the BTI line would in future be extended as a tram through Biel SBB station and through the city to Bözingenfeld railway station. Thus, the most important development areas (living, work, leisure) of the region would be connected without the need to change trains. With a total length of 27 kilometres, the line would be the longest tram line in Switzerland. The project was stopped by a government enquiry on 26 March 2015.
