= Fun'ambule =

Funicular railway in Neuchâtel, Switzerland

Coordinates: 46.9954°N 6.9372°E

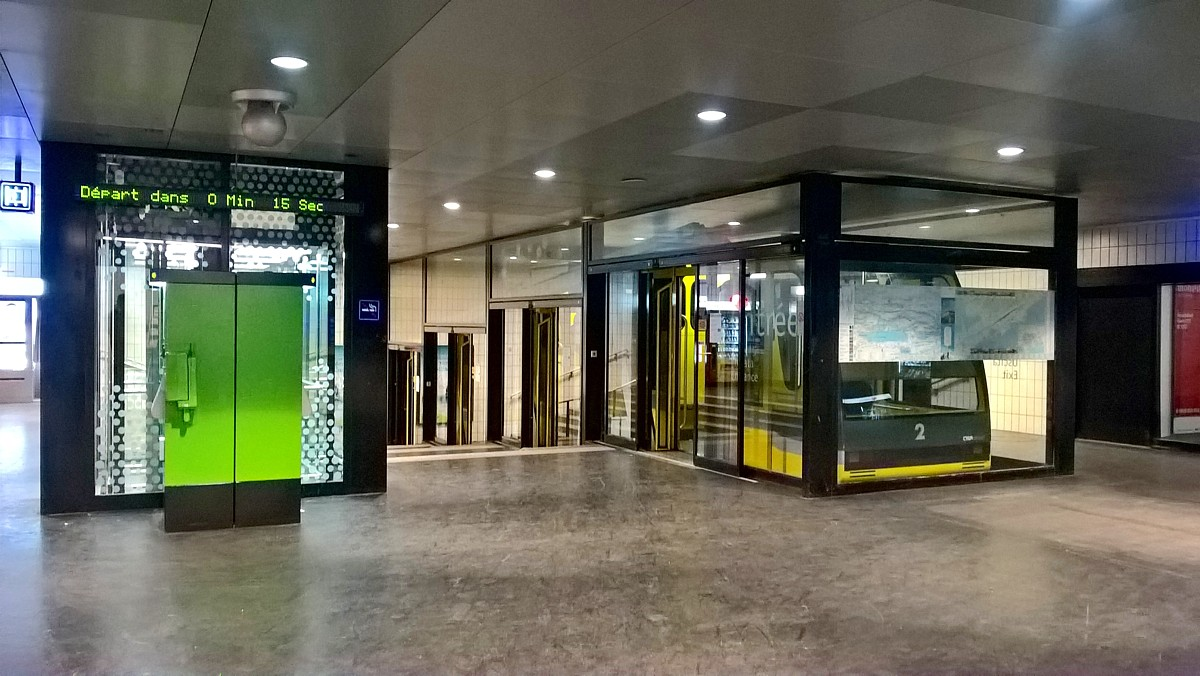
- Funicular Station at Neuchâtel railway station

Overview
- Status: in operation
- Locale: Neuchâtel, Canton of Neuchâtel, Switzerland
- Termini: "Neuchâtel-Université (FUNI)"; "Neuchâtel-gare (FUNI)"
- Stations: 2
- Website: TransN

Service
- Type: funicular railway
- Operator(s): Transports publics Neuchâtelois
- Rolling stock: 2 for 126 passengers each

History
- Opened: 27 April 2001 (24 years ago)

Technical
- Track length: 330 metres (1,080 ft)
- Track gauge: 1,600 mm (5 ft 3 in)
- Electrification: from opening
- Operating speed: 8 metres per second (26 ft/s)
- Highest elevation: 470 m (1,540 ft)
- Maximum incline: 34%

The Fun'ambule is a funicular railway in the city of Neuchâtel in the Swiss canton of Neuchâtel. The line runs in tunnel and links the lower part of the town, near the University, to the Neuchâtel railway station in the upper part.

== History ==
The funicular opened on April 27, 2001.

== Operation ==
The line has the following parameters:

Feature	Value
Number of cars	2
Number of stops	2
Configuration	Single track with passing loop
Track length	330 metres (1,080 ft)
Rise	46 metres (151 ft)
Maximum gradient	34%
Track gauge	1,600 mm (5 ft 3 in)
Capacity	126 passengers per car
Maximum speed	8 metres per second (26 ft/s)

== See also ==
- List of funicular railways
- List of funiculars in Switzerland
