= Fribourg–Yverdon railway =

Railway line in Switzerland

Fribourg−Yverdon railway
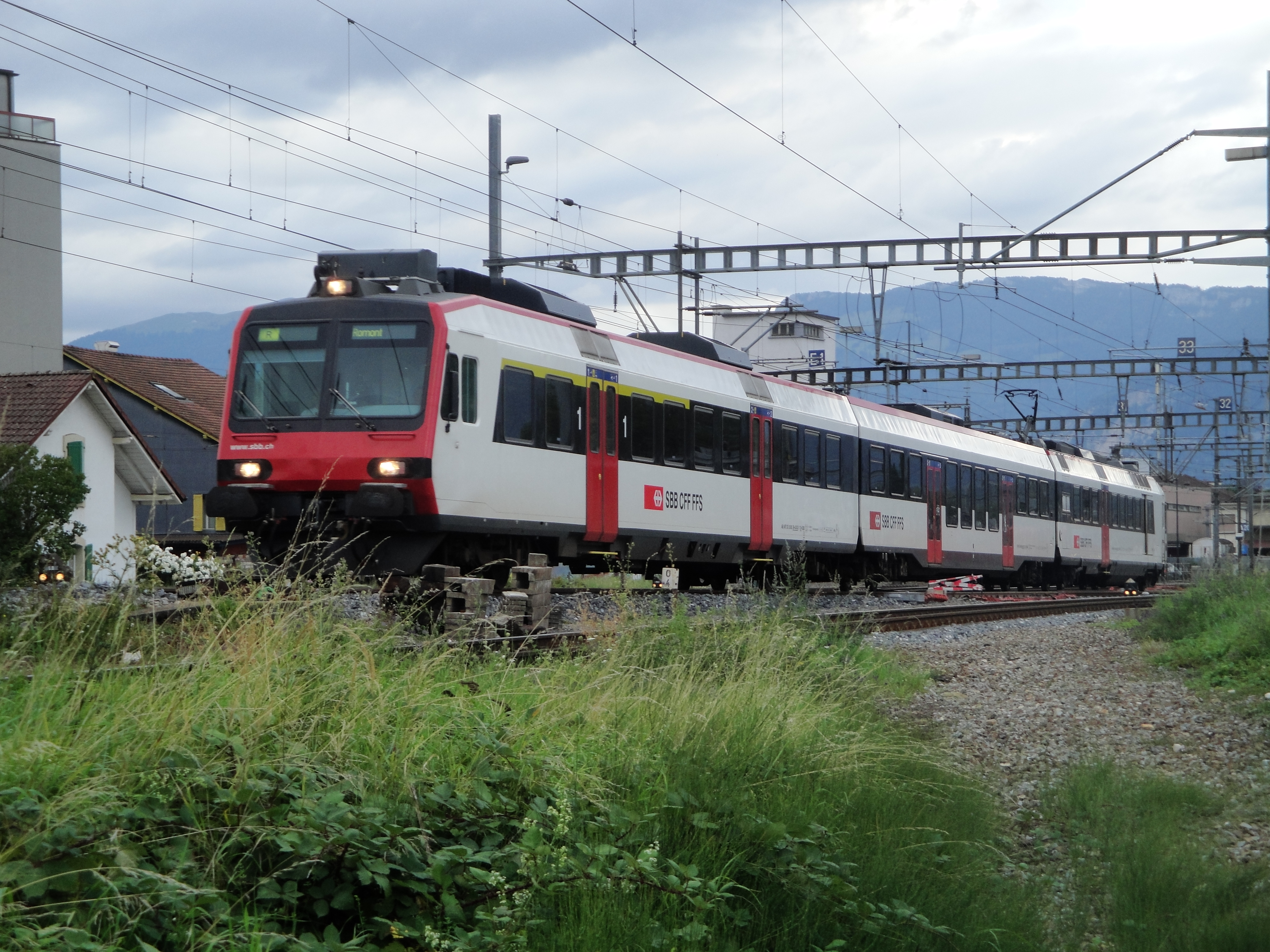
- Départure of an NPZ Domino set at the exit from Yverdon-les-Bains station.

Overview
- Owner: Swiss Federal Railways
- Line number: 252
- Termini: Yverdon-les-Bains; Fribourg/Freiburg

Technical
- Line length: 49.9 km (31.0 mi)
- Number of tracks: 1
- Track gauge: 1,435 mm (4 ft 8 1/2 in)
- Electrification: 15 kV 16.7 Hz AC overhead catenary
- Maximum incline: 2.1%

The Fribourg−Yverdon railway is a single-track standard-gauge line of the Swiss Federal Railways (SBB) in Romandy.

The line is sometimes considered to form one of two lines that intersect at Payerne station and are referred to in French as the Ligne de la Broye (Broye line) or in German as the Broyelinien (Broye lines) or Broyetallinien (Broye valley lines). The Fribourg−Yverdon railway is considered to form the Broye transversal. The Palézieux–Lyss railway includes the Broye longitudinal (Palézieux–Payerne–Murten–Kerzers). The lines are named after the Broye river, which passes through the cantons of Vaud and Fribourg, crossing the cantonal border ten times in total.

== History ==
The line was opened in two stages:

- 25 August 1876: Payerne–Palézieux
- 1 February 1877: Payerne–Yverdon.

The line was owned by the Western Swiss Railways (Chemins de fer de la Suisse Occidentale), which already operated the Jura Foot Railway via Yverdon and the Lausanne–Bern railway via Fribourg. The competition from the two established main lines and the rural character of the catchment area never allowed the Fribourg−Yverdon railway to advance beyond the status of a secondary line. Various mergers of railway companies led to the line becoming owned by the SBB at its foundation in 1903.

Most of the line was electrified in 1944–1947, late by Swiss standards and reflecting its low traffic. The Givisiez–Fribourg section had already been electrified from 1903 to 1947 for the trains of the Chemin de fer Fribourg–Morat–Anet (FMA) at 750 Volt and side-contact third rail.

== Route ==
The line runs from Yverdon to Estavayer-le-Lac through the Grande Cariçaie wetland landscape along the shores of Lake Neuchatel, before running through the broad Broye valley. The watershed between the Broye and the Saane is climbed after Payerne on a winding ramp that climbs at up to 2.1%.
