= S21 (RER Fribourg) =

Railway in Switzerland

Overview
- First service: 14 December 2014
- Current operator(s): Transports publics Fribourgeois

Route
- Termini: Neuchâtel; Fribourg/Freiburg
- Stops: 11
- Distance travelled: 45.3 kilometres (28.1 mi)
- Average journey time: 56 minutes
- Service frequency: Hourly
- Line(s) used: Bern–Neuchâtel line; Fribourg–Ins line

The S21 is a railway service of RER Fribourg that provides hourly service between Neuchâtel and Fribourg/Freiburg, in the Swiss cantons of Neuchâtel, Bern and Fribourg, respectively. Transports publics Fribourgeois operates the service.

== Operations ==
The S21 runs hourly between Neuchâtel and Fribourg/Freiburg. It uses the western end of the Bern–Neuchâtel line and the entirety of the Fribourg–Ins line. It is paired with the S20, providing half-hourly service.

== History ==
RER Fribourg introduced the S21 designation on 14 December 2014 for a rush-hour service between Fribourg and Kerzers. In December 2017 it was changed to an hourly service on weekdays between Fribourg and Ins, paired with the S20 and together providing half-hourly service. With the December 2021 timetable change, both the S20 and S21 were extended south from Fribourg to Romont, replacing the S40. The S21 began running on weekends with this change, while the S20 operated between Fribourg and Romont on weekdays only. In December 2024, the S21 was extended from Ins to Neuchâtel to provide half-hourly between Neuchâtel and Fribourg/Freiburg, the service between Fribourg and Romont was transferred to the S40/S41 lines.
