= S20 (RER Fribourg) =

Railway in Switzerland

Overview
- First service: 14 December 2014
- Current operator(s): Transports publics Fribourgeois

Route
- Termini: Neuchâtel; Fribourg/Freiburg
- Stops: 11
- Distance travelled: 45.3 kilometres (28.1 mi)
- Average journey time: 56 minutes
- Service frequency: Hourly
- Line(s) used: Bern–Neuchâtel line; Fribourg–Ins line

The S20 is a railway service of RER Fribourg that provides hourly service between Neuchâtel and Fribourg/Freiburg, in the Swiss cantons of Neuchâtel and Fribourg, respectively. Transports publics Fribourgeois operates the service.

== Operations ==
The S20 runs hourly between Neuchâtel and Fribourg/Freiburg. It uses the western end of the Bern–Neuchâtel line and the entirety of the Fribourg–Ins line. It is paired with the S21, providing half-hourly service between Neuchâtel and Fribourg/Freiburg.

== History ==
RER Fribourg introduced the S20 designation on 14 December 2014 for an hourly service between Fribourg/Freiburg and Neuchâtel. In December 2017, the S21, previously a rush-hour service between Fribourg and Kerzers, was re-routed to run between Fribourg and Ins and rescheduled for hourly service on weekdays, increasing the service level between Fribourg and Ins to half-hourly on weekdays. With the December 2021 timetable change, both the S20 and S21 were extended south from Fribourg to Romont, replacing the S40. The S21 began running on weekends with this change, while the S20 operated between Fribourg and Romont on weekdays only. In December 2024, the service between Fribourg and Romont was transferred to the S40/S41 lines.
