= Bern–Neuchâtel railway =

Railway line in Switzerland

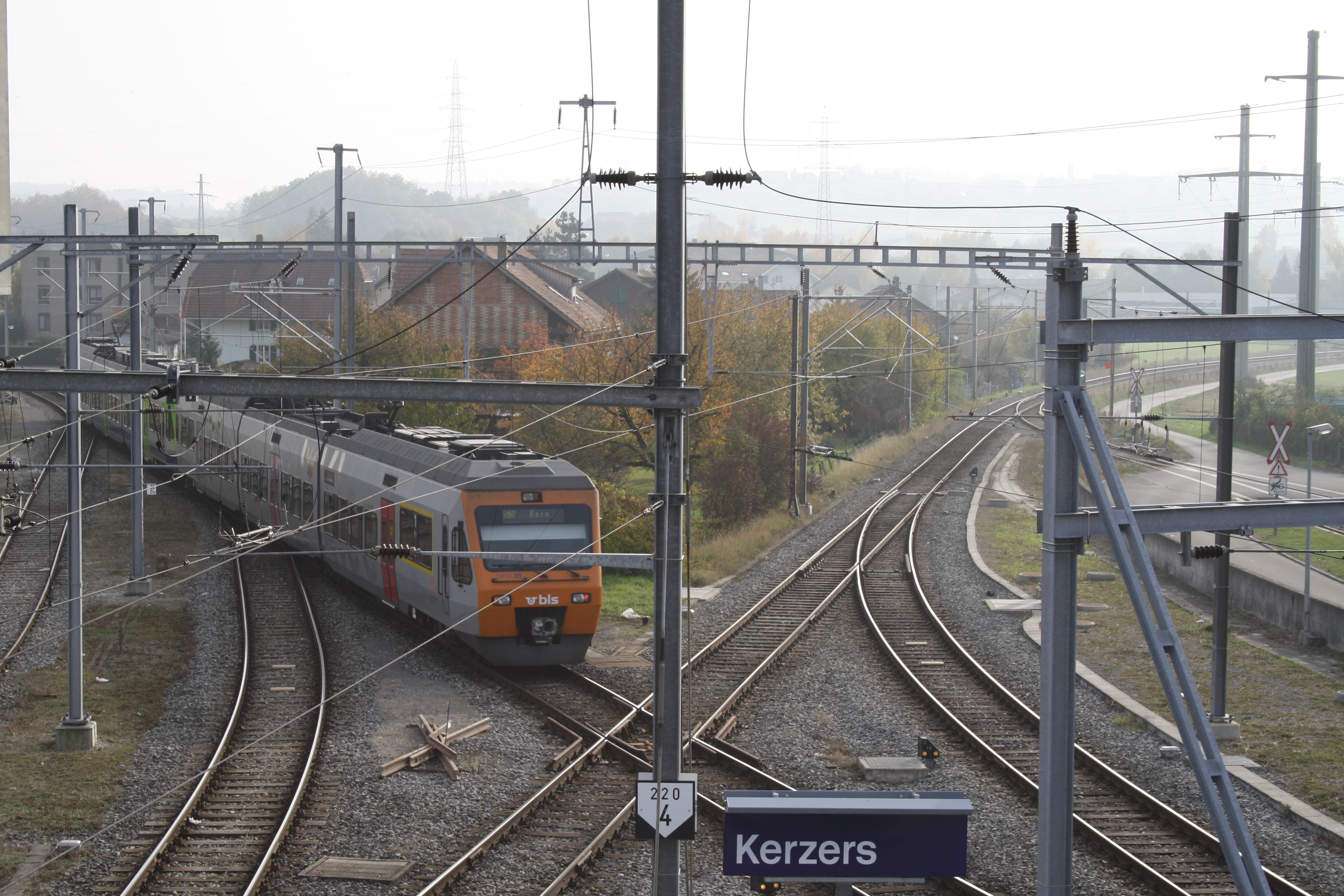
- Level crossing in Kerzers with train to Bern

Overview
- Line number: 305
- Termini: Bern; Neuchâtel

Technical
- Line length: 41.96 km (26.07 mi)
- Number of tracks: 2
- Track gauge: 1,435 mm (4 ft 8 1/2 in)
- Electrification: 15 kV/16.7 Hz AC overhead catenary
- Maximum incline: 2.2%

The Bern–Neuchâtel railway is a Swiss railway that was opened on 1 July 1901 by the Bern–Neuchâtel Railway (Bern-Neuenburg-Bahn). It is now part of the BLS AG network and is also called the Direkt Linie (direct line), because it crosses the Grand Marais in an almost straight line. In addition, the connection is part of the shortest railway line between Bern and Paris.

== Route ==
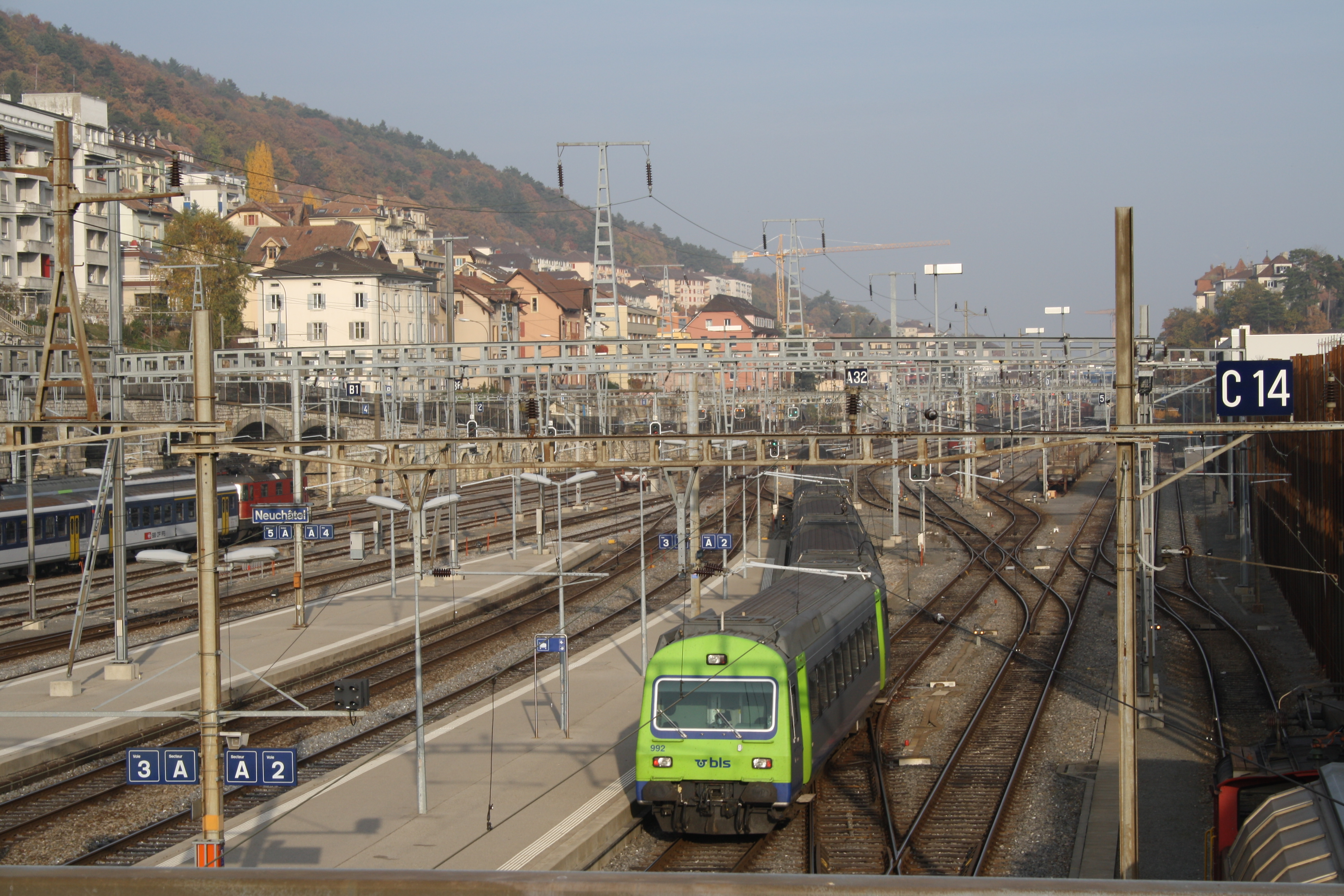
Neuchâtel with train arriving from Bern

The line was initially designed as a single track line for its full length. For the most part, it is still single track, but it is gradually being doubled.

The Bern–Holligen (BLS depot) section is shared with the Bern–Belp–Thun railway (Gürbetalbahn) and the line to Schwarzenburg.

There was a connection to the Flamatt–Gümmenen railway (Sensetalbahn—Sense Valley Railway) in Gümmenen between 1904 and 1993.

Immediately in front of Kerzers station, the line crosses the Palézieux–Kerzers railway (Broyelinie–Broye line) at a 60° angle. This is the only full crossing of two standard gauge railway lines in Switzerland. The station complex is designed as a Keilbahnhof (literally "wedge station"), a station located between branching tracks.

With the opening of this line, the Fribourg–Ins railway (French: Chemin de fer Fribourg–Morat–Anet) was extended from Murten to Ins; this section was also opened on 1 July 1901. The metre-gauge Biel–Täuffelen–Ins railway (Biel-Täuffelen-Ins-Bahn) has ended at the station forecourt since 19 March 1917.

In Neuchâtel, the route meets the existing Biel–Neuchâtel railway, which runs along the foot of the southern Jura. Lines branch from Neuchâtel station to Yverdon, Pontarlier and Le Locle.

Electric train operations on the Bümpliz Nord-Neuchâtel section commenced on 14 May 1928. The Bern (Holligen)–Bern Bümpliz Nord section had been electrified at 15 kV 16.7 Hz on 13 September 1923.

== Doubling ==
The BLS plans to complete doubling of the line to allow operations at 160 km/h. This has already been completed between Bern and Rosshäusern. The double track Rosshäusern Tunnel was opened on 25 August 2018 and doubling to the Saane is under way.

Double track was put into operations on the Ins–Fanelwald section on 24 June 2007 and it was extended to Zihlbrücke on 16 September 2012. The section is designed for operations at 160 km/h.

== Operations ==
Two BN Ea 3/6 tender locomotives were purchased for the line in 1913. They were the most powerful steam tender locomotives in Switzerland. Because of their high axle weights, no suitable alternative use could be found after the electrification of their home line, so they were scrapped early.

Today, in addition to the S5, S51 and S52 services of the Bern S-Bahn, BLS RegioExpress services run over the line.
