= Fribourg–Ins railway line =

Railway line in Switzerland

Fribourg–Ins

Overview
- Owner: Transports publics Fribourgeois
- Line number: 255
- Termini: Fribourg/Freiburg; Ins

Technical
- Line length: 25.60 km (15.91 mi)
- Number of tracks: 1
- Track gauge: 1,435 mm (4 ft 8 1/2 in)
- Electrification: 15 kV 16.7 Hz AC overhead catenary
- Maximum incline: 3.0%

The Fribourg–Ins railway line is a single-track standard-gauge line in Switzerland operated by Transports publics Fribourgeois. It was built by the Chemin de fer Fribourg–Morat–Anet (FMA).

== History ==
The Chemin de fer Fribourg–Morat (FM) (German: Freiburg-Murten-Bahn) opened the 22-kilometre (14 mi) standard-gauge line between Fribourg and Murten on 23 August 1898. The first four kilometres between Friborg and Givisiez that the FM used had been opened on 25 August 1876 by the Western Swiss Railways (Chemins de fer de la Suisse Occidentale, SO) as part of the Fribourg–Payerne section of the Fribourg–Yverdon railway (known as the Broye transversal). In Murten, the FM reached the Palézieux–Lyss railway (Palézieux–Murten–Lyss, known as the Broye longitudinal), which was also opened by the SO. The two Broye lines had already become part of the Jura–Simplon Railway (Chemins de Fer Jura–Simplon, JS).

On 1 May 1903, the line was extended by about 10 km from Murten to Ins (French: Anet) and the name of the company was changed to Chemin de fer Fribourg–Morat–Anet (FMA). Since then, the line has shared a 2.5 km-long section of the Fribourg−Yverdon railway between Murten and Muntelier, which was opened by the FMA on 12 June 1876. The JS, which owned the Broye lines, two parts of which were used by the FMA, was nationalised as part of the establishment of the Swiss Federal Railways (SBB) in 1903. In Ins, the Fribourg–Murten–Ins line reached the Bern–Neuchâtel railway, which was opened by the Bern-Neuenburg-Bahn (BN) on 1 July 1901.

The entire railway line was electrified with direct current on 23 July 1903. Since sections of the line were shared with the SBB, which would not at that time allow overhead wires, the FMA chose to use a side-contact third rail system—which is highly unusual in Switzerland. Only the Martigny–Châtelard Railway (MC) also uses a third rail system, but combined with sections of overhead wire. Over the years, the FMA used voltages between 750 and 900 volts.

Since 19 March 1917, there has been a connection to the metre-gauge Seeländische Lokalbahnen (SLB) line to Nidau; at the same time, a transporter wagon system was commissioned by the SLB. The SLB line was extended to Biel/Bienne on 21 August 1926.

On 1 January 1942 the FMA merged with the Chemin de fer Bulle–Romont and the Chemins de fer électriques de la Gruyère to form the Chemins de fer fribourgeois Gruyère–Fribourg–Morat (GFM).

The merger with the GFM had little impact on the operation of the FMA, as synergies with the BR were limited due to the geographical separation. With the progressive electrification of the surrounding SBB lines, the FMA was finally re-electrified with alternating current supplied via overhead line. Operations commenced under 15 kV 16 2/3 Hz on 12 August 1947.

On 1 January 2000 the GFM merged with the Transport en commun de Fribourg (TF) to form the Transports Publics Fribourgeois (Fribourg Public Transport, TPF) and the Fribourg–Murten–Ins has since belonged to the TPF.
