= Neuchâtel railway station =

Railway station in Neuchâtel, Switzerland

Neuchâtel
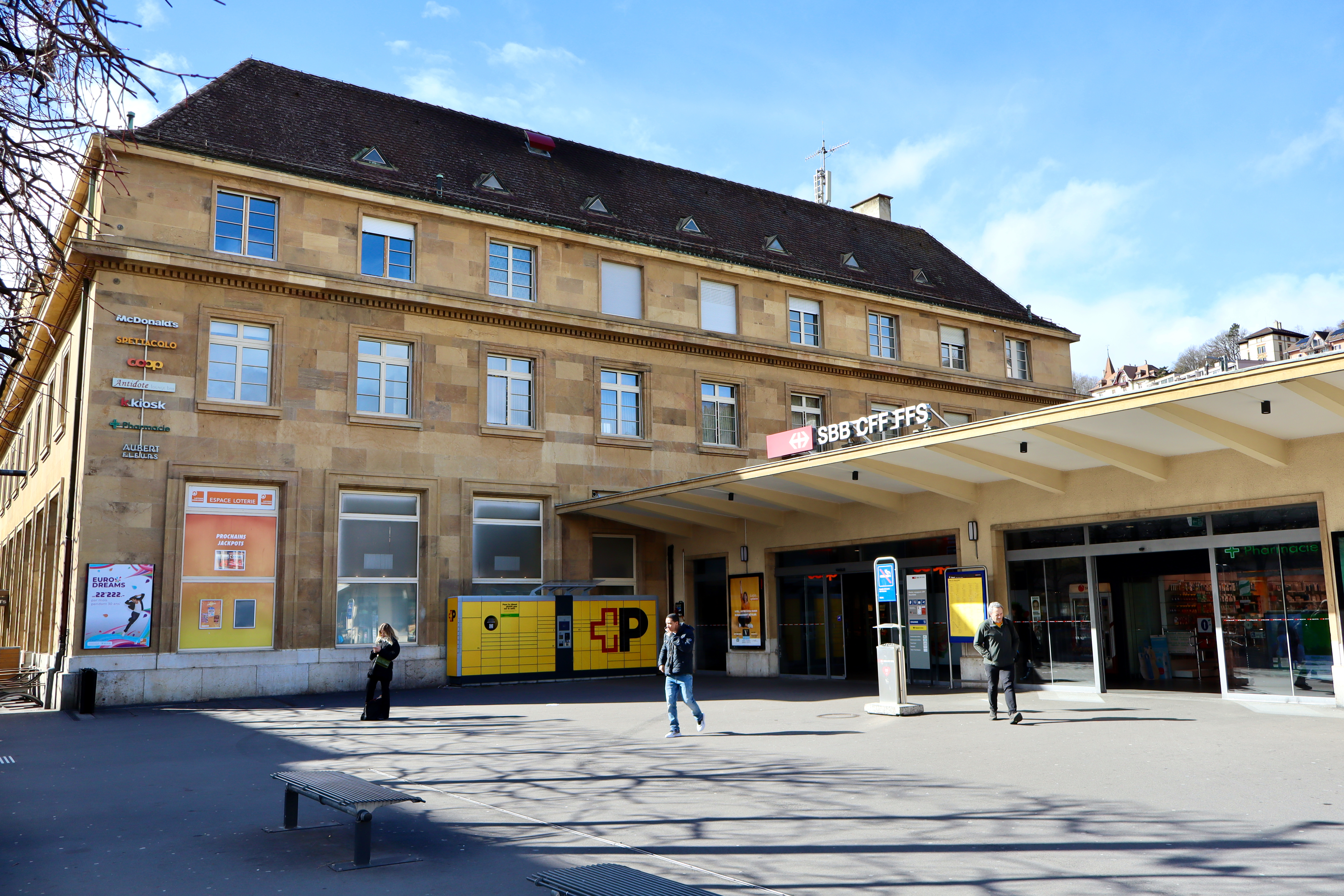
- The station building in 2024

General information
- Location: Place de la Gare 1 Neuchâtel; Switzerland
- Coordinates: 46°59′48″N 6°56′09″E
- Elevation: 479 m (1,572 ft)
- Owner: Swiss Federal Railways
- Lines: Bern–Neuchâtel line; Jura Foot line; Neuchâtel–Le Locle-Col-des-Roches line; Neuchâtel-Pontarlier line
- Distance: 42.9 kilometres (26.7 mi) from Bern; 75.3 kilometres (46.8 mi) from Lausanne
- Platforms: 7; 1 side platform; 3 island platforms
- Tracks: 7
- Train operators: BLS AG; Swiss Federal Railways; Transports publics Fribourgeois; Transports publics neuchâtelois
- Connections: TN trolleybuses (line 7); TN buses (lines 9, 9b, 10, S); CarPostal SA bus line

Construction
- Parking: Yes (190 spaces)
- Cycle facilities: Yes (278 spaces)
- Accessible: Yes

Other information
- Station code: 8504221 (NE)
- Fare zone: 10 (Onde Verte)

History
- Opened: 1857

Passengers
- 2025: 29,300 per day (BLS, SBB, TPF, transN)
- Rank: 24 out of 1,095
Services
Preceding station	SBB CFF FFS	Following station
Yverdon-les-Bains towards Lausanne	IC 5	Biel/Bienne towards Zürich HB, St. Gallen or Rorschach
Yverdon-les-Bains towards Lausanne	IC 51	Biel/Bienne towards Basel SBB
Yverdon-les-Bains towards Geneva Airport	IR 57	Terminus
Chambrelien towards Le Locle	RE6	Terminus
Travers towards Frasne	RE9	Terminus
Travers towards Frasne	RE9 Weekends only	Bern Terminus
Neuchâtel-Serrières towards Yverdon-les-Bains	R13	St-Blaise CFF towards Biel/Bienne
Terminus	R16	St-Blaise CFF towards Biel/Bienne
Les Deurres towards Corcelles-Peseux	R23	Terminus
Preceding station	BLS	Following station
Chambrelien towards La Chaux-de-Fonds	IR 66	Ins towards Bern
Terminus	IR 66 Rush-hour service	Ins One-way operation
Terminus	IR 66 Rush-hour service	Marin-Epagnier towards Bern
Preceding station	RER Fribourg	Following station
Terminus	S20	St-Blaise-Lac towards Fribourg/Freiburg
Terminus	S21	Marin-Epagnier towards Fribourg/Freiburg
Preceding station	Transports publics Neuchâtelois	Following station
Neuchâtel-Serrières towards Buttes	R21	Terminus
Preceding station	Bern S-Bahn	Following station
Terminus	S5	St-Blaise-Lac towards Bern
Location
- Location within Switzerland Location within Canton of Neuchâtel

Neuchâtel railway station (French: Gare de Neuchâtel) serves the municipality of Neuchâtel, the capital city of the canton of Neuchâtel, Switzerland. Opened in 1857, it is owned and operated by SBB-CFF-FFS.

The station forms part of one of Switzerland's most important railway lines, the Jura foot railway (Olten–Genève-Aéroport), which is one of two routes used by intercity trains between Geneva and Zürich. It is also a junction for SBB-CFF-FFS lines to Le Locle and Pontarlier, and for the BLS line from Bern.

== Location ==
Neuchâtel railway station is situated at Place de la Gare to the north east of the city centre, about a 15-minute walk from the central pedestrian zone. The Funambule funicular links the station to the lower part of the town, near the university.

== Services ==
As of the December 2025 timetable change, the following services stop at Neuchâtel:

- InterCity: half-hourly service between Lausanne and Biel/Bienne and hourly service to Rorschach and Basel SBB.
- InterRegio:
  - : hourly service between La Chaux-de-Fonds and Bern.
  - : daily rush-hour service on weekdays to Bern.
  - limited service to Geneva Airport.
- RegioExpress:
  - hourly service to Le Locle.
  - three trains per day to Frasne, connecting with the Paris–Lausanne TGV Lyria service.
  - daily service on weekends to Bern.
- Regio:
  - hourly to half-hourly service to Biel/Bienne.
  - half-hourly service to Buttes.
  - half-hourly service to Corcelles-Peseux.
  - hourly service to Yverdon-les-Bains.
- RER Fribourg S20/S21: half-hourly service to Fribourg/Freiburg.
- Bern S-Bahn S5: hourly service to Bern.

== See also ==
- History of rail transport in Switzerland
- Rail transport in Switzerland
- Trams in Neuchâtel
