= Fribourg/Freiburg railway station =

Railway station in Fribourg, Switzerland

Fribourg/Freiburg
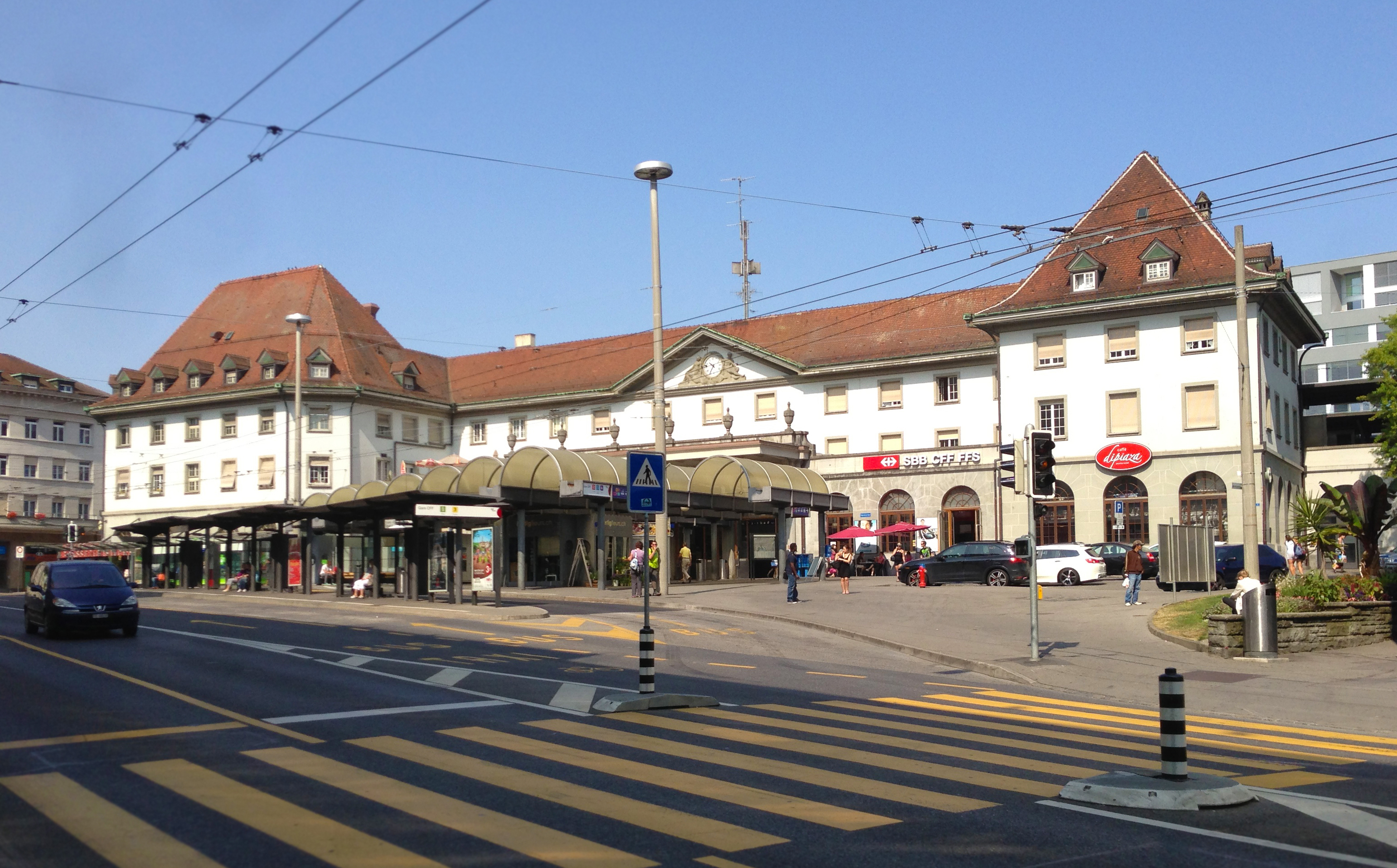
- Fribourg railway station, 2013

General information
- Location: Avenue de la Gare; Fribourg; Switzerland
- Coordinates: 46°48′12″N 7°09′04″E
- Elevation: 629 m (2,064 ft)
- Owner: Swiss Federal Railways
- Lines: Fribourg–Ins line; Fribourg–Yverdon line; Mittellandlinie
- Platforms: 5: 2 island platforms; 1 side platform
- Tracks: 5
- Train operators: BLS AG; Swiss Federal Railways; Transports publics Fribourgeois
- Connections: TPF buses; TPF trolleybuses

Construction
- Parking: Yes (69 spaces)
- Cycle facilities: Yes (225 spaces)
- Accessible: Yes

Other information
- Station code: 8504100 (FRI)
- IATA code: ZHF
- Fare zone: 10 (frimobil)

History
- Opened: 20 August 1862
- Rebuilt: 1872–1873, 1928
- Former names: Fribourg (until 2012)

Passengers
- 2025: 30,800 per day (BLS, SBB, TPF)
- Rank: 22 out of 1,095

Services
Preceding station	SBB CFF FFS	Following station
Lausanne towards Geneva Airport	IC 1	Bern towards St. Gallen
Romont FR towards Geneva Airport	IR 15	Bern towards Lucerne
Romont FR towards Le Châble VS	VosAlpes Express	Terminus
Preceding station	RER Fribourg	Following station
Romont FR towards Broc-Chocolaterie	RE2	Düdingen towards Bern
Romont FR towards Broc-Chocolaterie	RE3	Düdingen Terminus
Terminus	S20	Givisiez towards Neuchâtel
Terminus	S21	Givisiez towards Neuchâtel
through to S40	S30	Givisiez towards Yverdon-les-Bains
through to S41	S30	Givisiez towards Yverdon-les-Bains
Villars-sur-Glâne towards Lausanne	S40	through to S30
Villars-sur-Glâne towards Lausanne	S41	through to S30
Preceding station	Bern S-Bahn	Following station
Terminus	S1	Fribourg/Freiburg Poya towards Thun
Location
- Location within Switzerland Location within Canton of Fribourg

Fribourg/Freiburg railway station (French: Gare de Fribourg; German: Bahnhof Freiburg im Üechtland) serves the municipality of Fribourg, capital of the canton of Fribourg, Switzerland. Opened in 1862, it is owned and operated by SBB-CFF-FFS.

The station forms part of the Lausanne–Bern railway, which is the original portion of the Olten–Lausanne railway line (French: Ligne du Plateau suisse; German: Mittellandlinie). It is also the junction for the Yverdon-les-Bains–Payerne–Fribourg railway, and the Fribourg–Ins railway.

== Location ==
Fribourg railway station is right in the heart of the city centre, which has shifted from the Old City to the railway station quarter since the station's construction.

== History ==
The station was opened on 20 August 1862 by the Western Swiss Railways (French: Société des chemins de Fer Ouest-Suisse), upon completion of the Fribourg–Bern section of the Lausanne–Bern railway.

Completion of that section had been delayed for two years, due to the need to construct the 352 m (1,155 ft) long Grandfey Viaduct over the Saane/Sarine river, just to the north of the station. On 2 September 1862, the remaining section of the line was opened between Lausanne and Fribourg.

The first station building at Fribourg was a simple wooden hut. Between 1872 and 1873, a more substantial replacement building was constructed adjacent to the hut. The new building's design had been entrusted to the architect Adolphe Fraisse.

Initially, the army had not wanted the Lausanne–Bern railway to pass through Fribourg. The military had believed that the line would be too "vulnerable" in case of conflict. The government and the city had to fight for the route and the station. By 1905, the authorities wanted a new station building, which was completed in 1928.

On 7 September 2007, the 1872 station building became a cultural centre, incorporating a café, an entertainment hall and two festival theatres, for $4.5 million Swiss francs. A Swiss heritage site of regional significance (class B), the building houses the Nouveau Monde and its theatre, the International Film Festival of Fribourg and Belluard Bollwerk International.

== Services ==
As of the December 2024 timetable change, the following services stop at Fribourg/Freiburg:

- InterCity: hourly service between Geneva Airport and St. Gallen.
- InterRegio: hourly service between Geneva Airport and Lucerne.
- VosAlpes Express: daily direct service to Le Châble VS on weekends between December and April.
- RER Fribourg:
  - RE2 / RE3: half-hourly service between Düdingen and Broc-Chocolaterie and hourly service from Düdingen to Bern.
  - S20 / S21: half-hourly service to Neuchâtel.
  - S30 S30: half-hourly service to Yverdon-les-Bains.
  - S40 / S41: half-hourly service to Lausanne.
- Bern S-Bahn S1: half-hourly service to Thun.

== Interchange ==
Seven urban bus lines operated by the Transports publics fribourgeois call at the station, including TPF trolleybus lines.

== See also ==
- History of rail transport in Switzerland
- Rail transport in Switzerland
