= Düdingen =

- Municipality
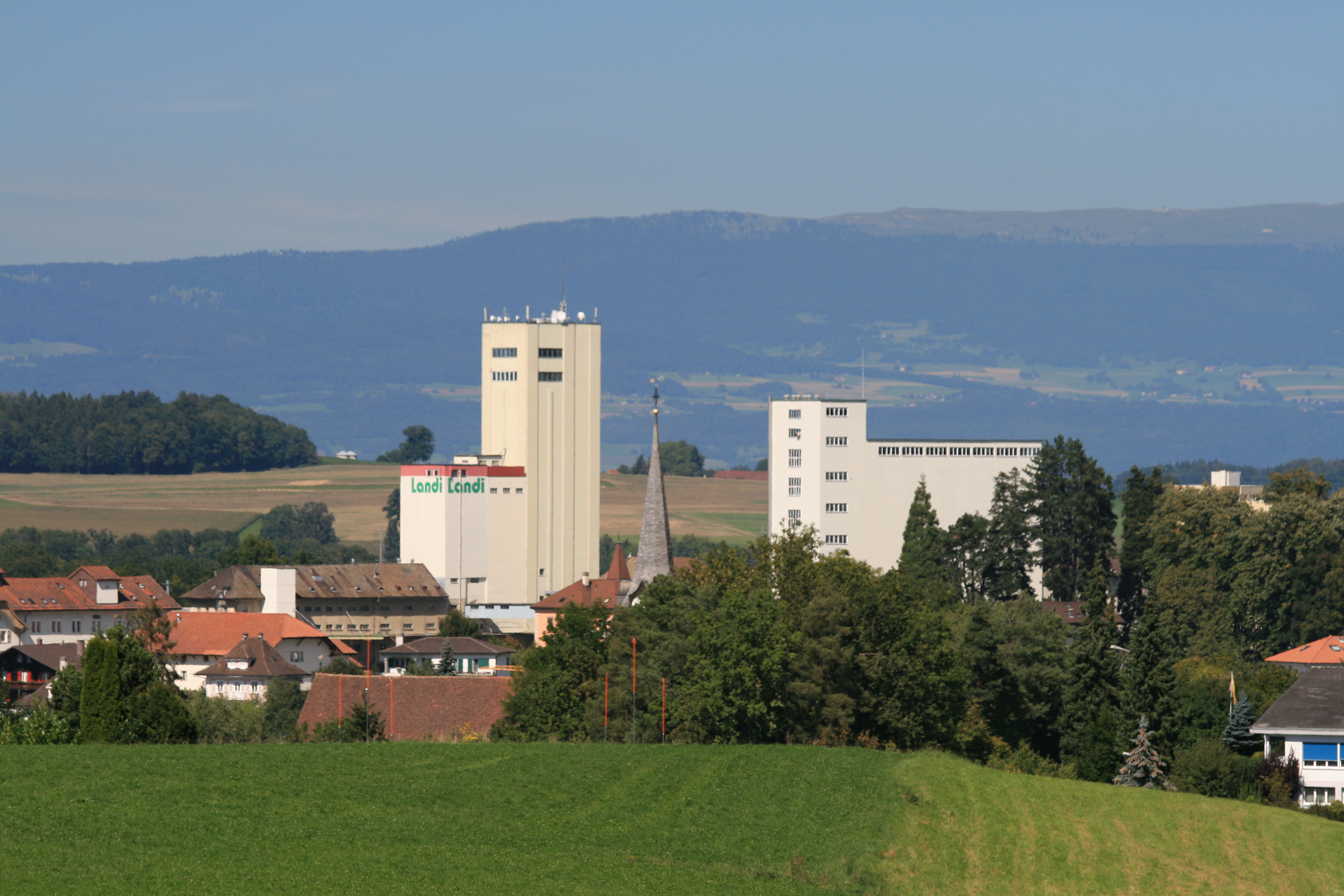
- Düdingen

- Flag Coat of arms
- Location of Düdingen
- Location within Switzerland Location within Canton of Fribourg
- Coordinates: 46°51′N 7°11′E
- Country: Switzerland
- Canton: Fribourg
- District: Sense

Government
  - Mayor: Gemeindeammann

Area
  - Total: 30.86 km^{2} (11.92 sq mi)
- Elevation: 596 m (1,955 ft)

Population (December 2020)
  - Total: 8,300
  - Density: 270/km^{2} (700/sq mi)
- Time zone: UTC+01:00 (CET)
  - Summer (DST): UTC+02:00 (CEST)
- Postal code: 3186
- SFOS number: 2293
- ISO 3166 code: CH-FR
- Surrounded by: Barberêche, Bösingen, Fribourg (Freiburg im Üechtland/Fribourg), Granges-Paccot, Gurmels, Kleinbösingen, La Sonnaz, Schmitten, Tafers
- Website: www.duedingen.ch

Düdingen (German: [ˈdyːdɪŋən]; French: Guin [ɡɛ̃]; Arpitan: Duens, locally Dyin [ɟɛ̃]) is a municipality in the district of Sense in the canton of Fribourg in Switzerland. It is one of the municipalities with a large majority of German speakers in the mostly French-speaking Canton of Fribourg.

== History ==
Düdingen is first mentioned in 1180 as Doens. In 1258 it was mentioned as Tiudingen and in 1414 as Dyung.

== Geography ==
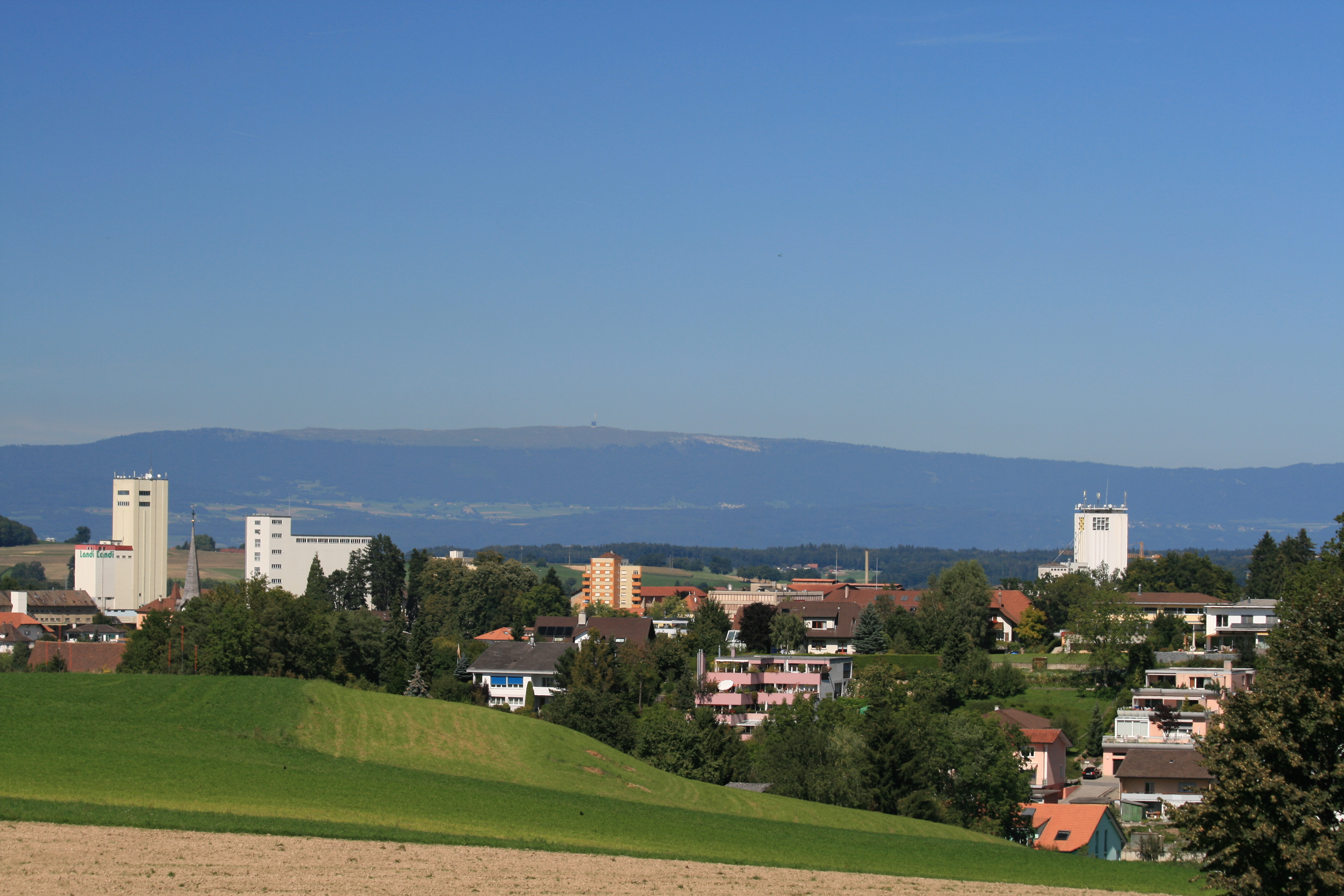
Düdingen

Aerial view (1964)

Düdingen has an area of 30.76 km^{2} (11.88 sq mi). Of this area, 20.78 km^{2} (8.02 mi^{2}) or 67.5% is used for agricultural purposes, while 4.08 km^{2} (1.58 mi^{2}) or 13.3% is forested. Of the rest of the land, 3.83 km^{2} (1.48 mi^{2}) or 12.4% is settled (buildings or roads), 1.95 km^{2} (0.75 mi^{2}) or 6.3% is either rivers or lakes and 0.18 km^{2} (0.069 mi^{2}) or 0.6% is unproductive land.

Of the built up area, housing and buildings made up 5.5% and transportation infrastructure made up 4.4%. Out of the forested land, 12.1% of the total land area is heavily forested and 1.2% is covered with orchards or small clusters of trees. Of the agricultural land, 48.9% is used for growing crops and 16.3% is pastures, while 2.3% is used for orchards or vine crops. All the water in the municipality is in lakes.

The municipality is located in the Sense district, north of Fribourg. It is the municipality with the biggest population of the Sense district. It consists of a number of hamlets including Mariahilf, Schiffenen, Bonn, Sankt Wolfgang, Ottisberg, Garmiswil, Jetschwil, Heitiwil and Galmis.

== Coat of arms ==
The blazon of the municipal coat of arms is Argent an Ox Skull Or and in on a Chief Gules three Roses of the first barbed and seeded proper.

== Demographics ==
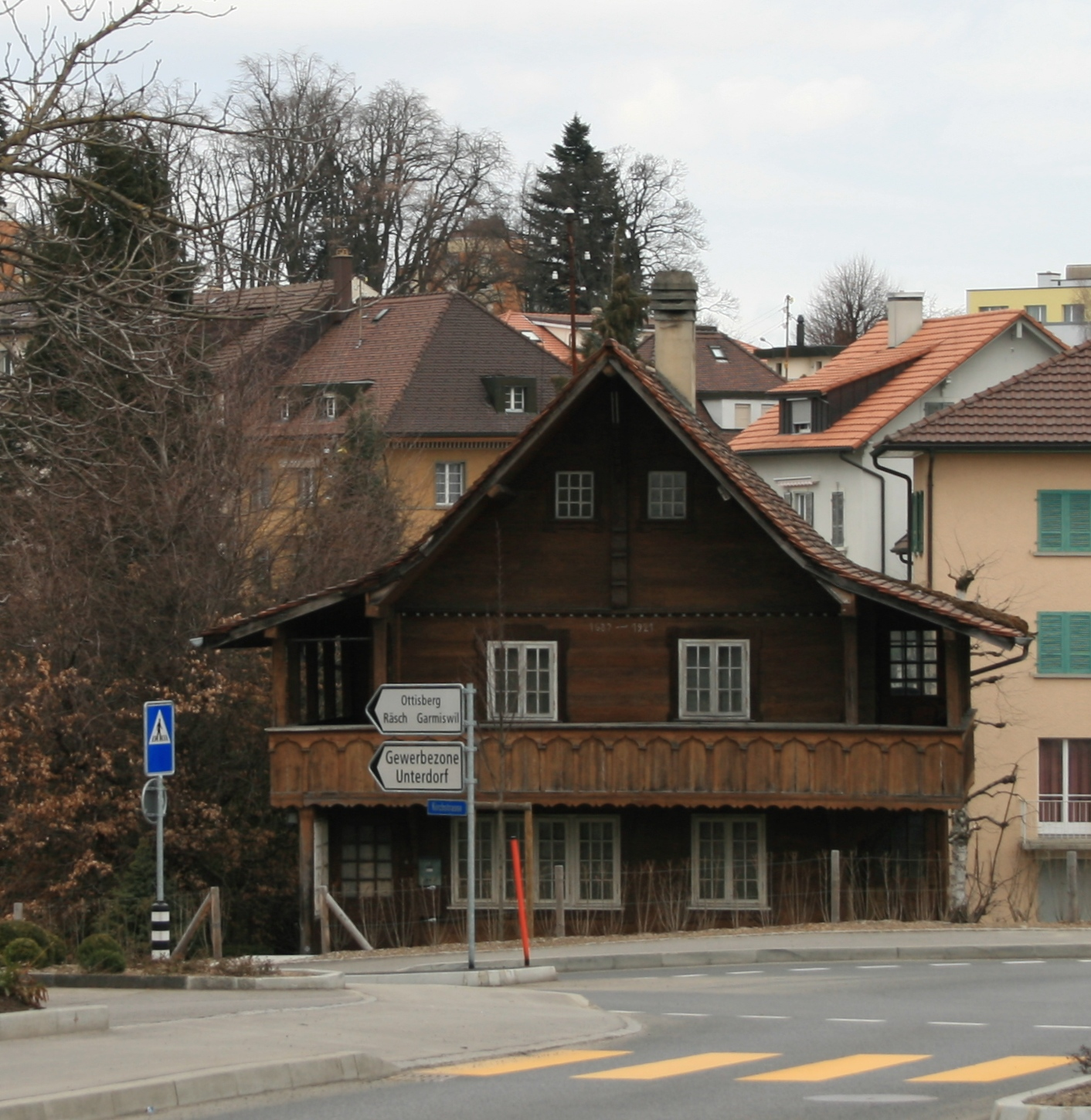
Houses in Düdingen

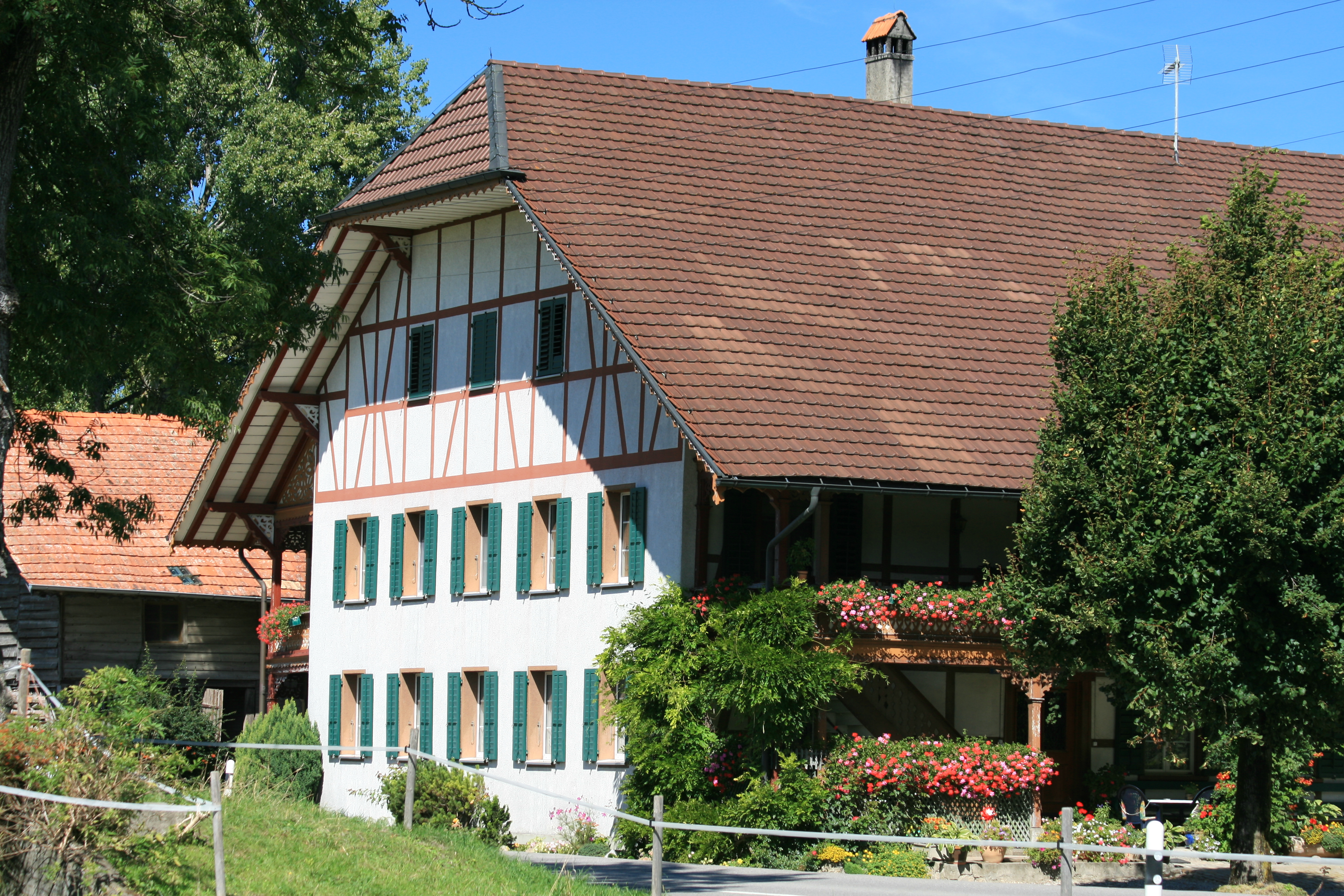
Farm house in Jetschwil hamlet

Düdingen has a population (as of December 2020) of 8,300. As of 2008, 9.7% of the population are resident foreign nationals. Over the last 10 years (2000–2010) the population has changed at a rate of 8.6%. Migration accounted for 5.9%, while births and deaths accounted for 2.8%.

Most of the population (as of 2000) speaks German (6,021 or 89.7%) as their first language, French is the second most common (300 or 4.5%) and Serbo-Croatian is the third (101 or 1.5%). There are 24 people who speak Italian.

As of 2008, the population was 49.8% male and 50.2% female. The population was made up of 3,223 Swiss men (44.5% of the population) and 389 (5.4%) non-Swiss men. There were 3,281 Swiss women (45.3%) and 356 (4.9%) non-Swiss women. Of the population in the municipality, 2,785 or about 41.5% were born in Düdingen and lived there in 2000. There were 2,008 or 29.9% who were born in the same canton, while 1,114 or 16.6% were born somewhere else in Switzerland, and 646 or 9.6% were born outside of Switzerland.

As of 2000, children and teenagers (0–19 years old) make up 23.8% of the population, while adults (20–64 years old) make up 64.3% and seniors (over 64 years old) make up 11.9%.

As of 2000, there were 2,935 people who were single and never married in the municipality. There were 3,216 married individuals, 337 widows or widowers and 224 individuals who are divorced.

As of 2000, there were 2,597 private households in the municipality, and an average of 2.5 persons per household. There were 685 households that consist of only one person and 202 households with five or more people. In 2000, a total of 2,527 apartments (93.2% of the total) were permanently occupied, while 128 apartments (4.7%) were seasonally occupied and 55 apartments (2.0%) were empty. As of 2009, the construction rate of new housing units was 4.7 new units per 1000 residents. The vacancy rate for the municipality, in 2010, was 0.8%.

The historical population is given in the following chart:

== Heritage sites of national significance ==
The farm house at Galmis 6, the former hermitage of St. Magdalena, the Grandfey-Viadukt (shared with Granges-Paccot), the de Boccard country manor, the von Montenach country manor, the pilgrimage chapel at St. Wolfgang 25 and the pilgrimage chapel Muttergottes are listed as Swiss heritage site of national significance. The entire hamlets of Jetschwil and Galmis are part of the Inventory of Swiss Heritage Sites.

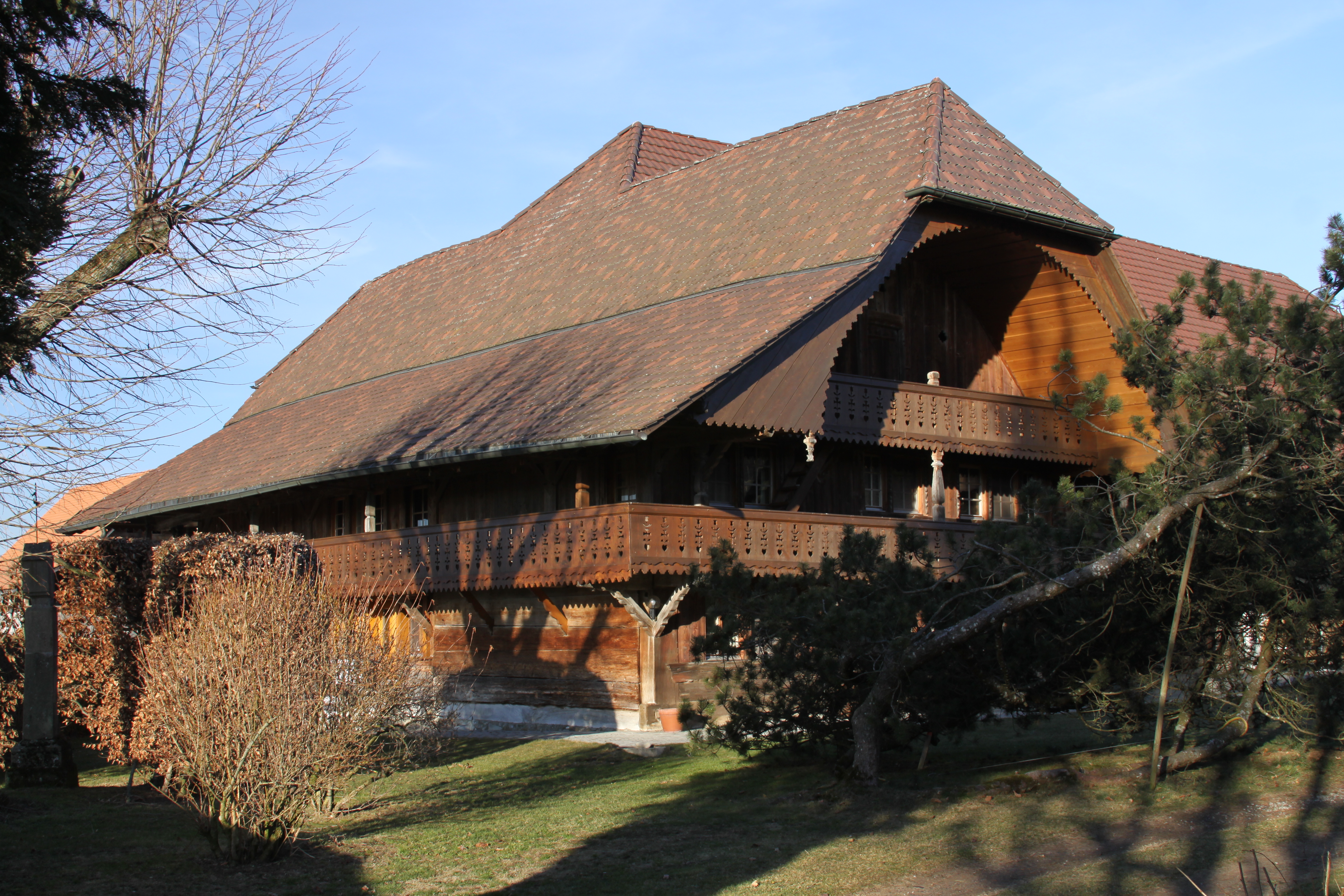
Farm House at Galmis 6

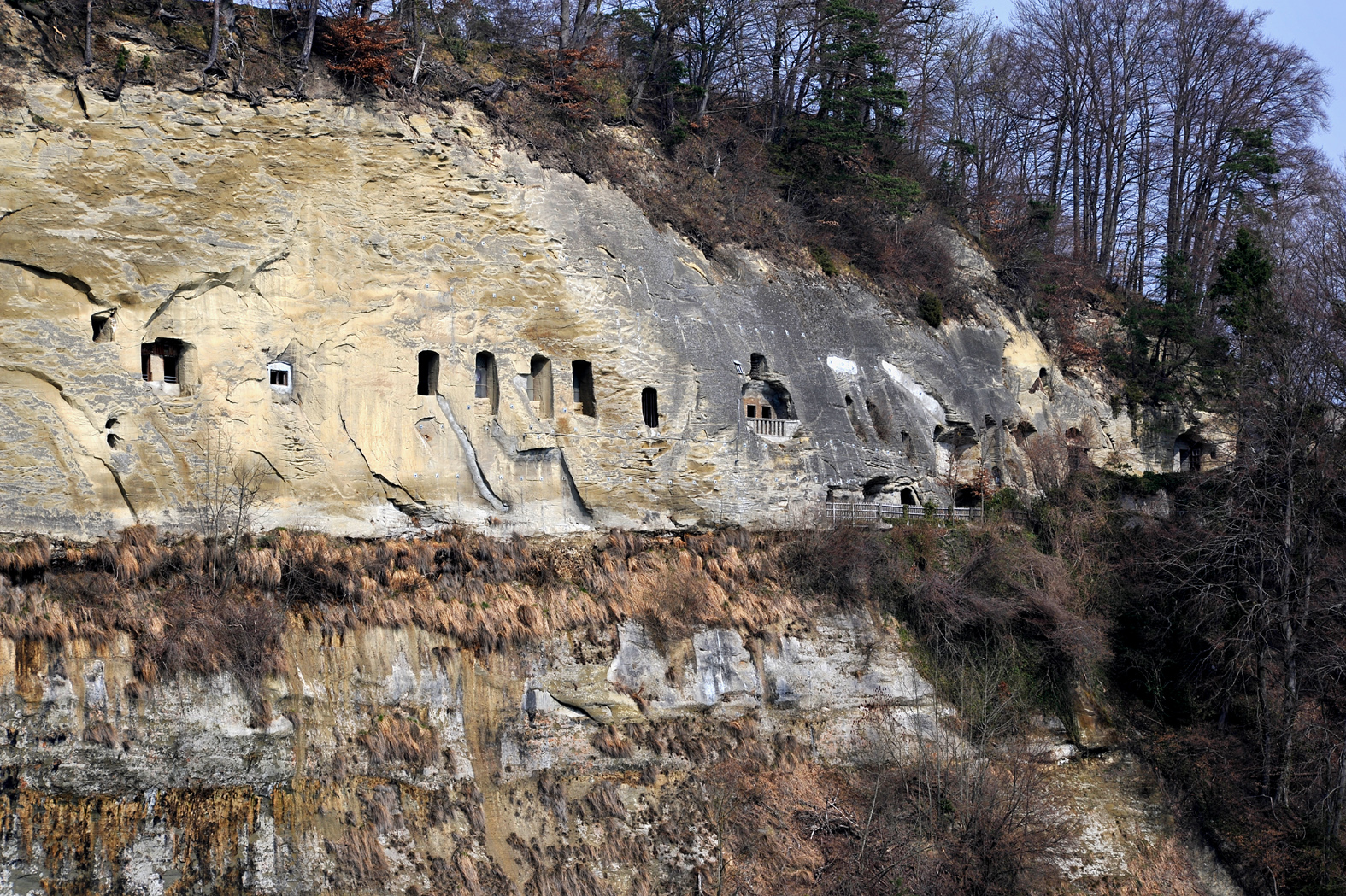
Former Hermitage of St. Magdalena

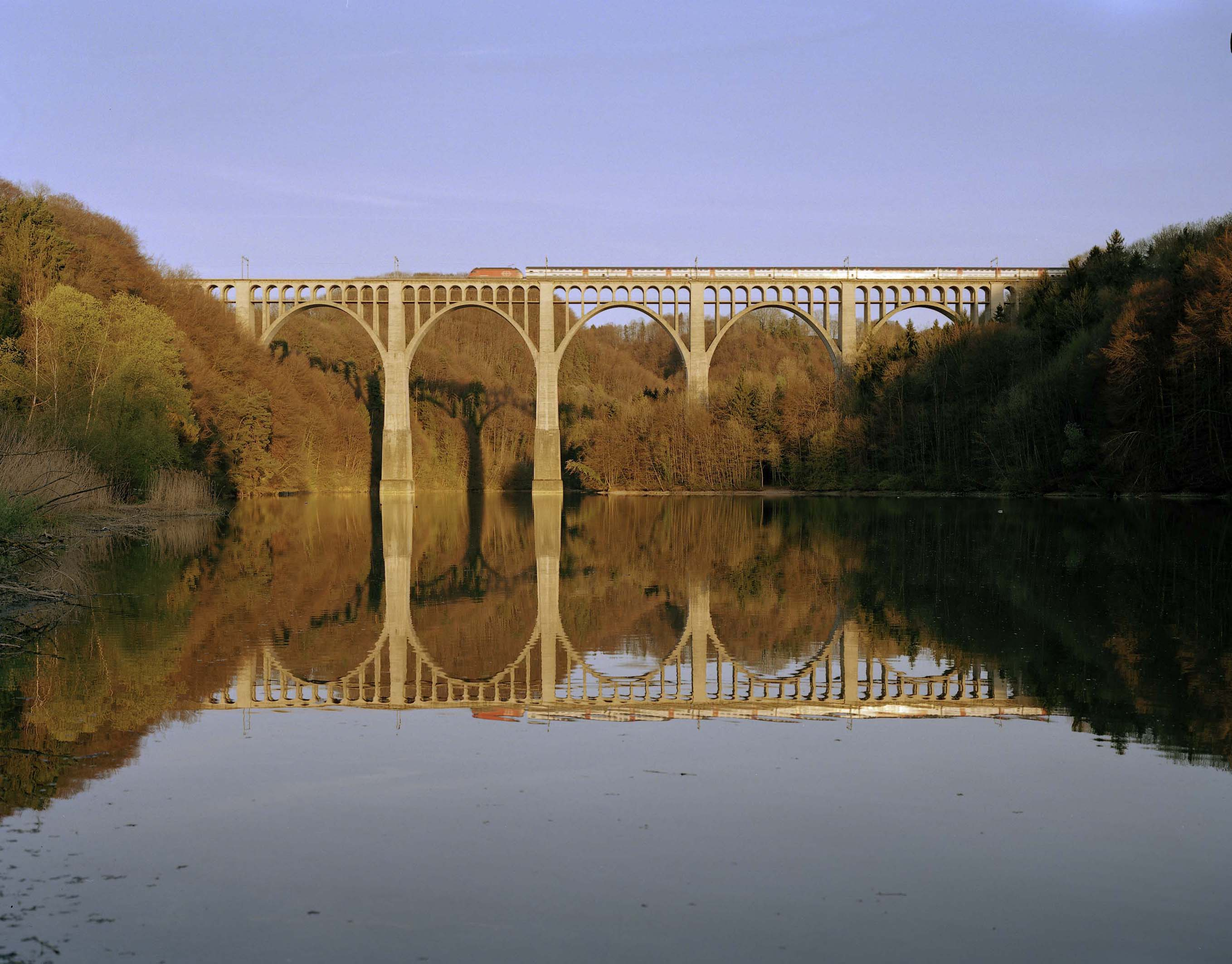
Grandfey-Viadukt (shared with Granges-Paccot)

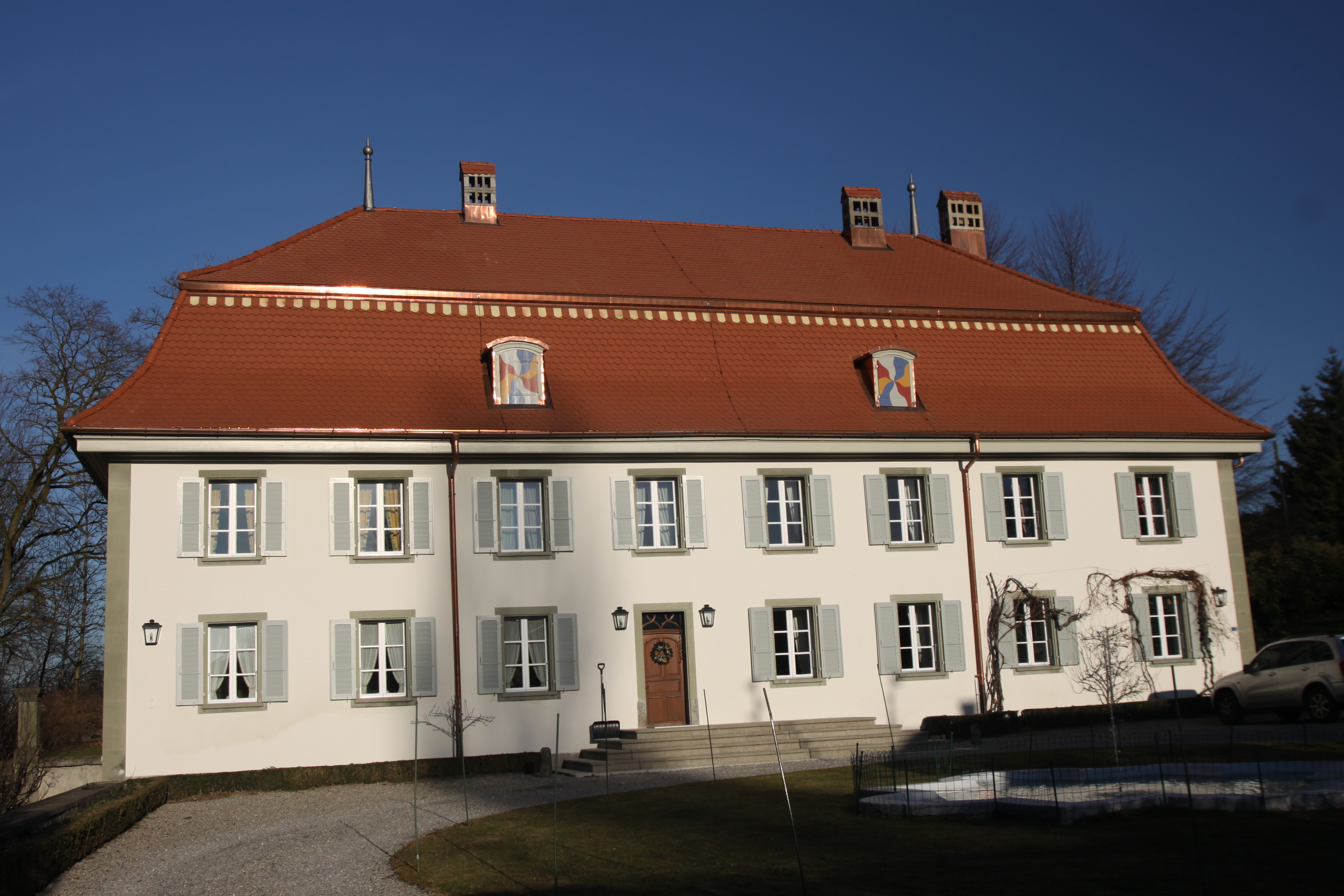
Landsitz (country manor) de Boccard

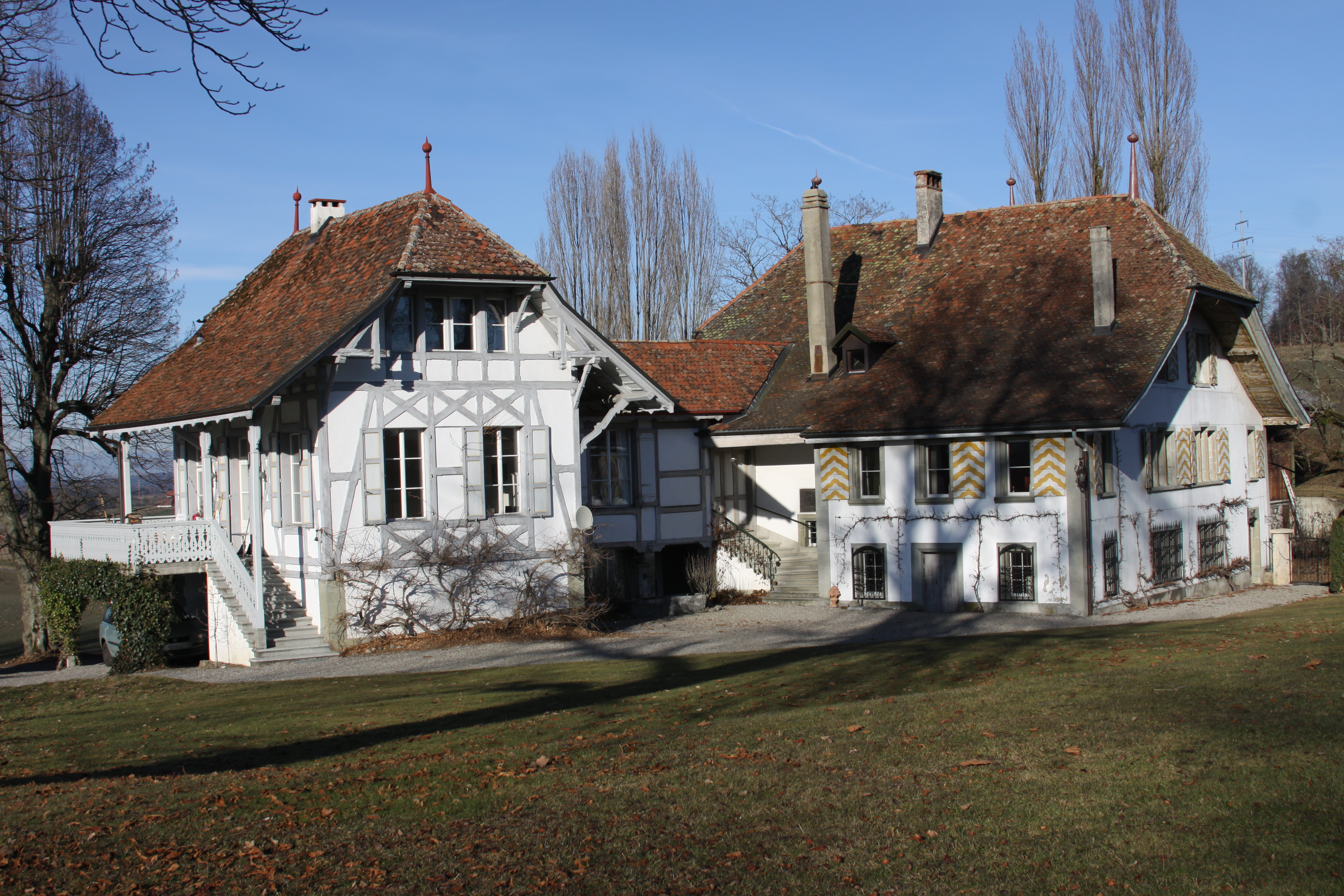
Landsitz (country manor) von Montenach

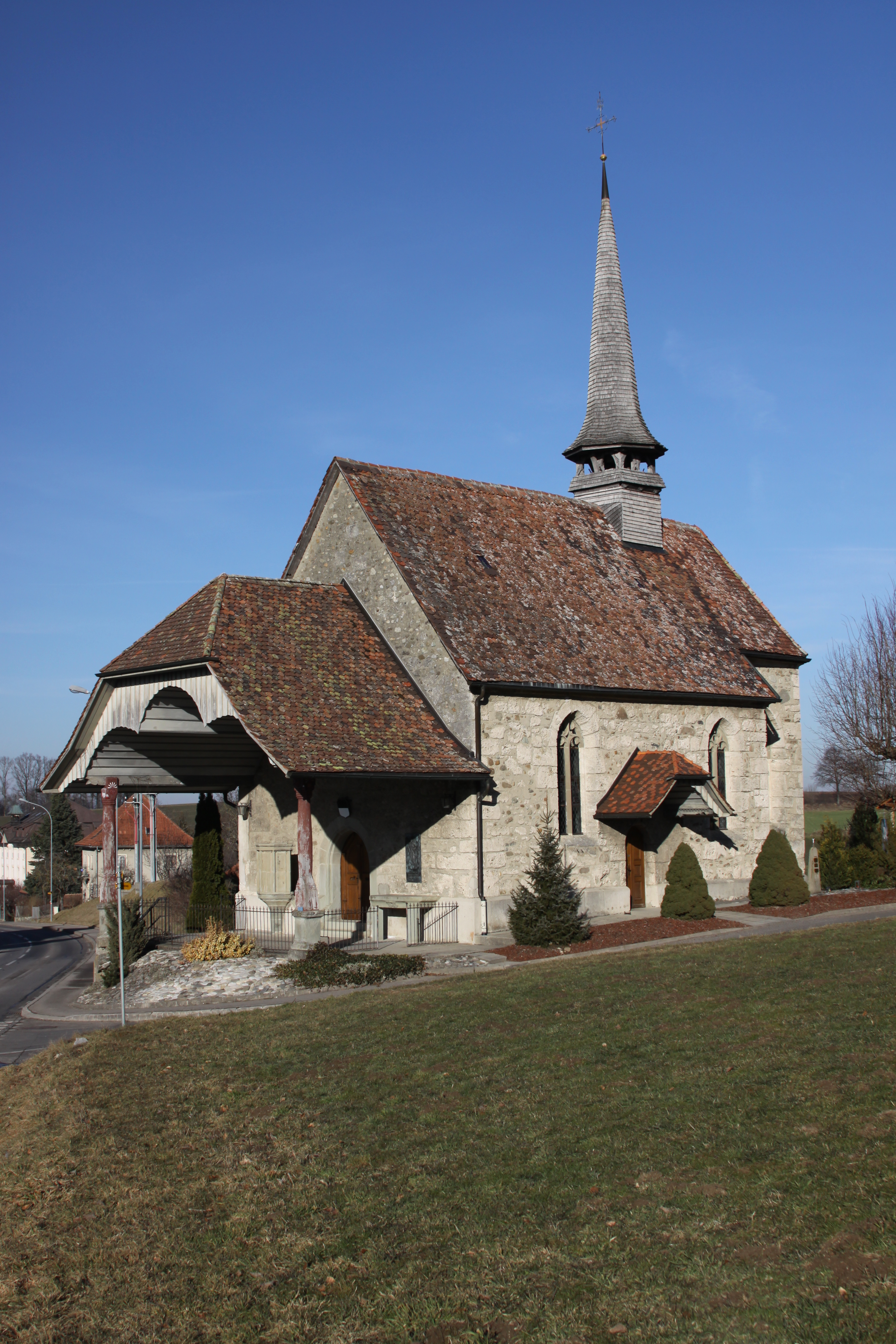
Pilgrimage Chapel at St. Wolfgang 25

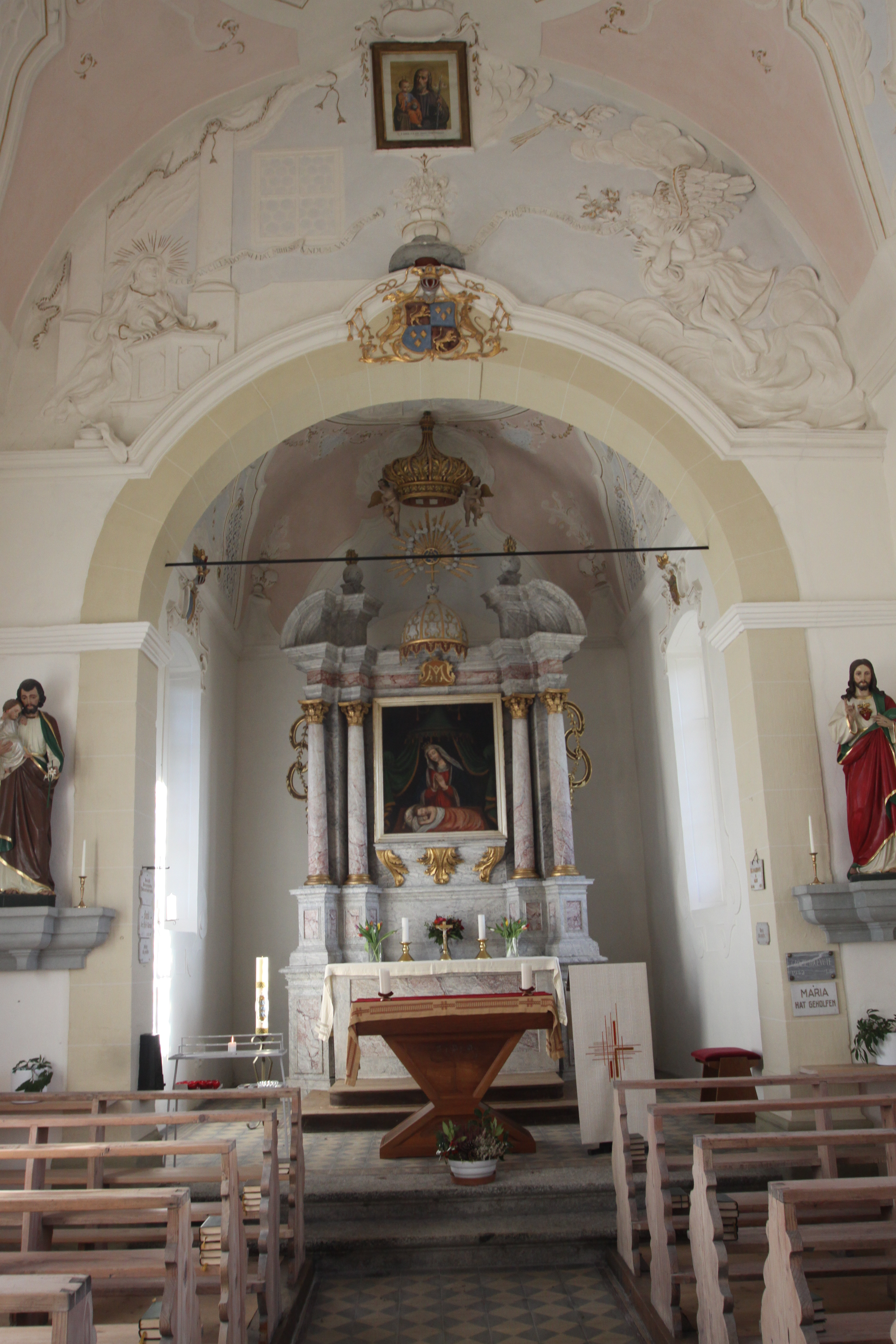
Pilgrimage Chapel Muttergottes

== Politics ==
In the 2011 federal election the most popular party was the CVP which received 22.6% of the vote. The next three most popular parties were the SPS (21.3%), the SVP (19.5%) and the FDP (10.2%).

The CVP received about the same percentage of the vote as they did in the 2007 Federal election (24.5% in 2007 vs 22.6% in 2011). The SPS retained about the same popularity (19.1% in 2007), the SVP retained about the same popularity (18.8% in 2007) and the FDP moved from below fourth place in 2007 to fourth. A total of 2,748 votes were cast in this election, of which 17 or 0.6% were invalid.

== Economy ==
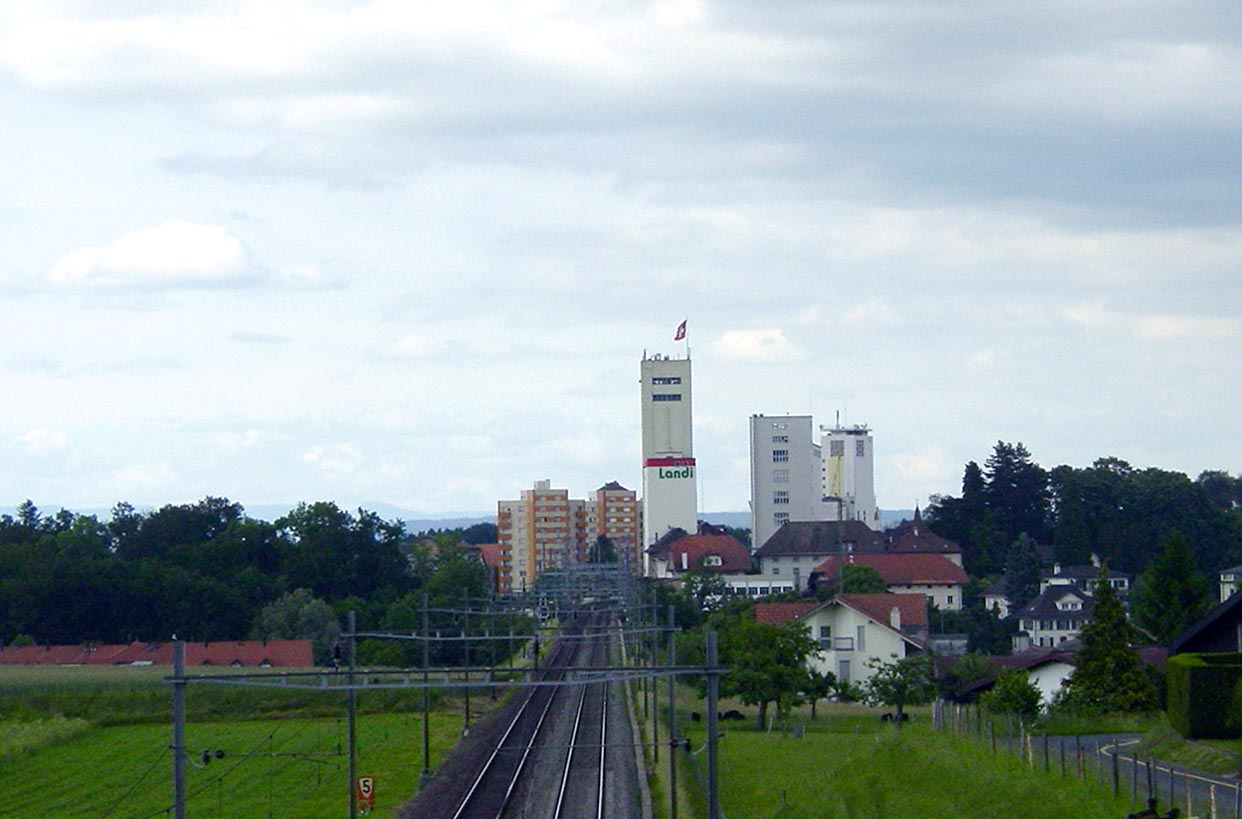
Grain silo and rail road in Düdingen

As of 2010, Düdingen had an unemployment rate of 1.9%. As of 2008, there were 243 people employed in the primary economic sector and about 88 businesses involved in this sector. 1,213 people were employed in the secondary sector and there were 78 businesses in this sector. 1,687 people were employed in the tertiary sector, with 236 businesses in this sector. There were 3,675 residents of the municipality who were employed in some capacity, of which females made up 42.6% of the workforce.

In 2008 the total number of full-time equivalent jobs was 2,654. The number of jobs in the primary sector was 167, all of which were in agriculture. The number of jobs in the secondary sector was 1,154 of which 733 or (63.5%) were in manufacturing, 6 or (0.5%) were in mining and 404 (35.0%) were in construction. The number of jobs in the tertiary sector was 1,333. In the tertiary sector; 531 or 39.8% were in wholesale or retail sales or the repair of motor vehicles, 28 or 2.1% were in the movement and storage of goods, 115 or 8.6% were in a hotel or restaurant, 21 or 1.6% were in the information industry, 84 or 6.3% were the insurance or financial industry, 159 or 11.9% were technical professionals or scientists, 79 or 5.9% were in education and 204 or 15.3% were in health care.

In 2000, there were 1,746 workers who commuted into the municipality and 2,230 workers who commuted away. The municipality is a net exporter of workers, with about 1.3 workers leaving the municipality for every one entering. Of the working population, 16.1% used public transportation to get to work, and 60.6% used a private car.

== Religion ==
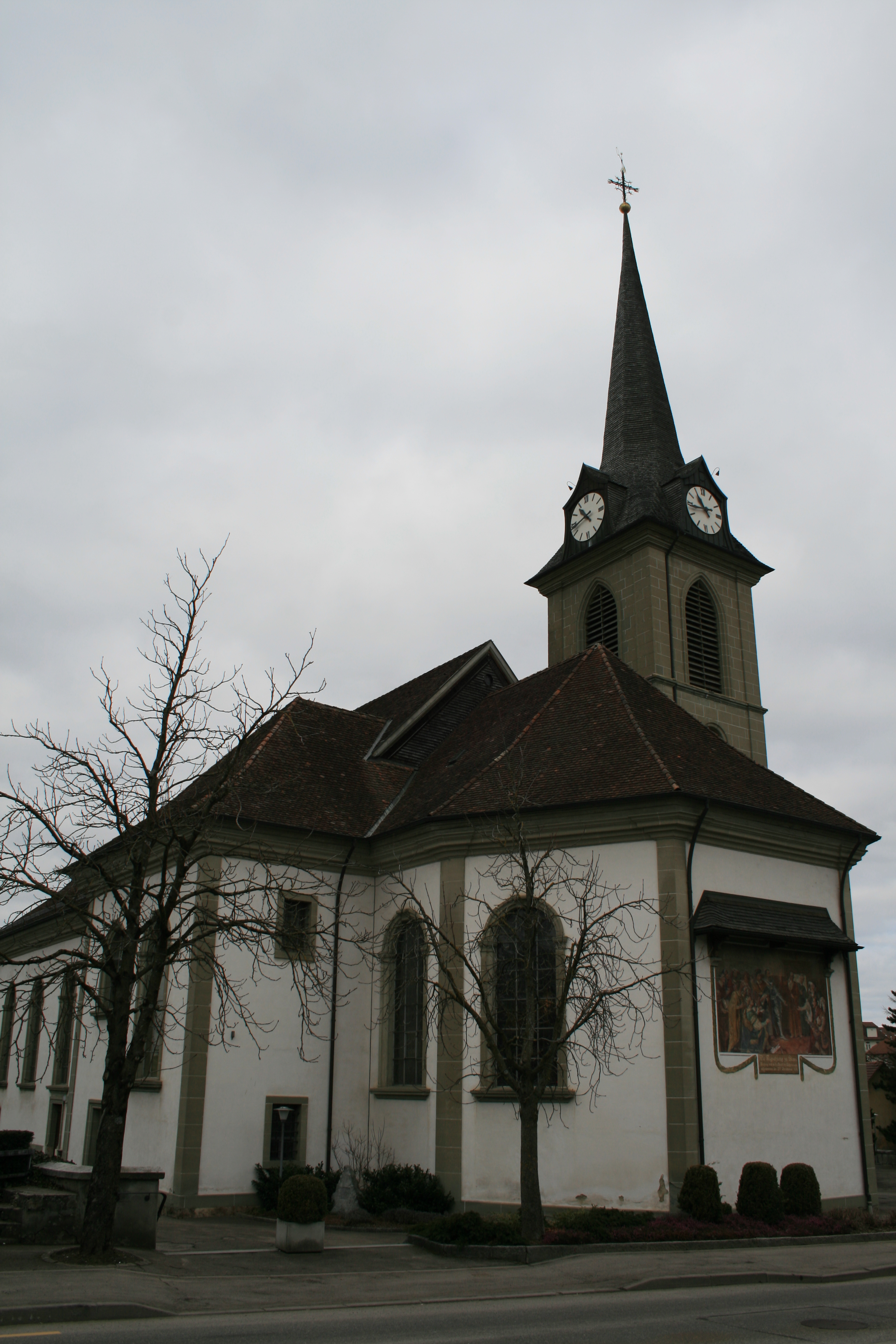
Roman Catholic church in Düdingen

From the 2000 census, 4,860 or 72.4% were Roman Catholic, while 1,023 or 15.2% belonged to the Evangelical Reformed Church of the Canton Freiburg. Of the rest of the population, there were 147 members of an Orthodox church (or about 2.19% of the population), there were 3 individuals (or about 0.04% of the population) who belonged to the Christian Catholic Church, and there were 118 individuals (or about 1.76% of the population) who belonged to another Christian church. There were 207 (or about 3.08% of the population) who were Islamic. There were 10 individuals who were Buddhist, 8 individuals who were Hindu and 3 individuals who belonged to another church. 230 (or about 3.43% of the population) belonged to no church, are agnostic or atheist, and 159 individuals (or about 2.37% of the population) did not answer the question.

== Education ==
In Düdingen about 2,486 or (37.0%) of the population have completed non-mandatory upper secondary education, and 881 or (13.1%) have completed additional higher education (either university or a Fachhochschule). Of the 881 who completed tertiary schooling, 71.4% were Swiss men, 22.4% were Swiss women, 4.3% were non-Swiss men and 1.9% were non-Swiss women.

The Canton of Fribourg school system provides one year of non-obligatory Kindergarten, followed by six years of Primary school. This is followed by three years of obligatory lower Secondary school where the students are separated according to ability and aptitude. Following the lower Secondary students may attend a three or four year optional upper Secondary school. The upper Secondary school is divided into gymnasium (university preparatory) and vocational programs. After they finish the upper Secondary program, students may choose to attend a Tertiary school or continue their apprenticeship.

During the 2010-11 school year, there were a total of 1,018 students attending 52 classes in Düdingen. A total of 1,069 students from the municipality attended any school, either in the municipality or outside of it. There were 7 kindergarten classes with a total of 137 students in the municipality. The municipality had 19 primary classes and 422 students. During the same year, there were 23 lower secondary classes with a total of 431 students. There were no upper Secondary classes or vocational classes, but there were 131 upper Secondary students and 113 upper Secondary vocational students who attended classes in another municipality. The municipality had 3 special Tertiary classes, with 28 specialized Tertiary students.

As of 2000, there were 155 students in Düdingen who came from another municipality, while 312 residents attended schools outside the municipality.

== Transportation ==
The municipality has a railway station, Düdingen, on the Lausanne–Bern line. It has regular service to Bern, Bulle, Fribourg/Freiburg, and Thun.

== Sport ==
SC Düdingen is a football club based in the town. They currently play in the Swiss 1. Liga, the third tier of Swiss football.

== Culture ==
Yearly the music festival Bad Bonn Kilbi takes place in the last week of May in Düdingen.
