= Villars-sur-Glâne railway station =

Railway station in Villars-sur-Glâne, Switzerland

Villars-sur-Glâne
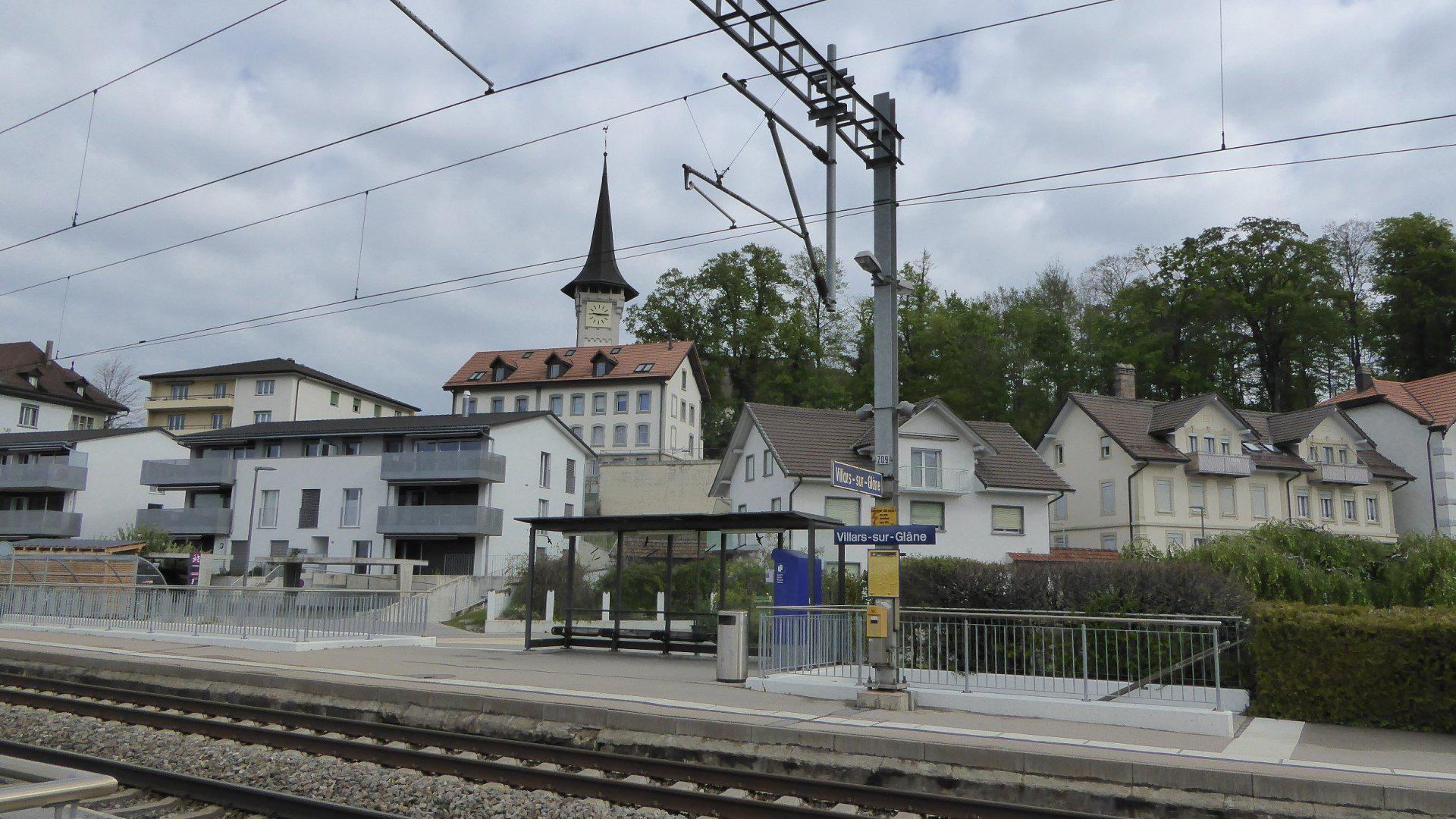
- The station platforms in 2019

General information
- Location: Villars-sur-Glâne; Switzerland
- Coordinates: 46°47′23″N 7°06′59″E
- Elevation: 639 m (2,096 ft)
- Owner: Swiss Federal Railways
- Line: Lausanne–Bern line
- Distance: 62.1 km (38.6 mi) from Lausanne
- Platforms: 2 (2 side platforms)
- Tracks: 2
- Train operators: Swiss Federal Railways
- Connections: Transports publics Fribourgeois buses

Construction
- Accessible: No

Other information
- Station code: 8504030 (VG)
- Fare zone: 10 (frimobil)

Passengers
- 2018: 260 per weekday (SBB)

Services
Preceding station	RER Fribourg	Following station
Avry-Matran towards Lausanne	S40	Fribourg/Freiburg Terminus
Avry-Matran towards Lausanne	S41	Fribourg/Freiburg Terminus
Location

Villars-sur-Glâne railway station (French: Gare de Villars-sur-Glâne, German: Bahnhof Villars-sur-Glâne) is a railway station in the municipality of Villars-sur-Glâne, in the Swiss canton of Fribourg. It is an intermediate stop on the standard gauge Lausanne–Bern line of Swiss Federal Railways.

== Services ==
As of the December 2024 timetable change, the following services stop at Villars-sur-Glâne:

- RER Fribourg S40 / S41: half-hourly service between Lausanne and Fribourg/Freiburg.
