= Givisiez =

- Municipality
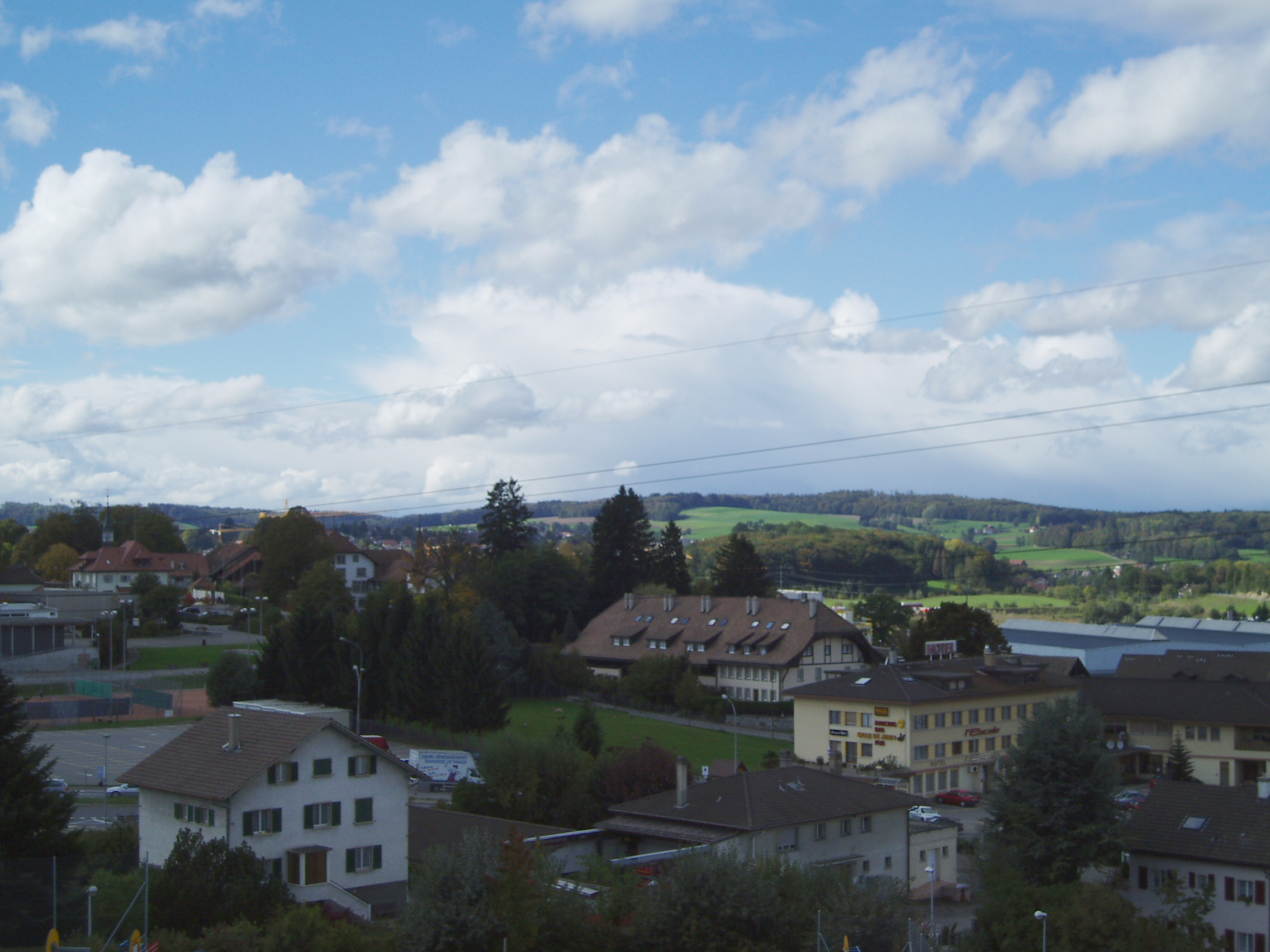
- Givisiez

- Coat of arms
- Location of Givisiez
- Location within Switzerland Location within Canton of Fribourg
- Coordinates: 46°49′N 7°8′E
- Country: Switzerland
- Canton: Fribourg
- District: Sarine

Government
  - Mayor: Syndic; Eric Mennel

Area
  - Total: 3.45 km^{2} (1.33 sq mi)
- Elevation: 629 m (2,064 ft)

Population (December 2020)
  - Total: 3,143
  - Density: 911/km^{2} (2,360/sq mi)
- Time zone: UTC+01:00 (CET)
  - Summer (DST): UTC+02:00 (CEST)
- Postal code: 1762
- SFOS number: 2197
- ISO 3166 code: CH-FR
- Surrounded by: Belfaux, Corminboeuf, Fribourg (Fribourg/Freiburg im Üechtland), Granges-Paccot, La Sonnaz, Villars-sur-Glâne
- Website: givisiez.ch

Givisiez (French: [ʒivizje]; Arpitan: Gevesiér [dzəvəˈʒi]) is a municipality in the district of Sarine in the canton of Fribourg in Switzerland. It was formerly known in German as Siebenzach, but this usage is no longer common.

== History ==
Givisiez is first mentioned in 1142 as Juvinsie. Until the beginning of the 19th century, it was known as Juvisy.

== Geography ==
Givisiez has an area, as of 2009, of 3.5 square kilometers (1.4 mi^{2}). Of this area, 1.19 km^{2} (0.46 mi^{2}) or 34.4% is used for agricultural purposes, while 0.8 km^{2} (0.31 mi^{2}) or 23.1% is forested. Of the rest of the land, 1.4 km^{2} (0.54 mi^{2}) or 40.5% is settled (buildings or roads), 0.02 km^{2} (4.9 acres) or 0.6% is either rivers or lakes and 0.04 km^{2} (9.9 acres) or 1.2% is unproductive land.

Of the built up area, industrial buildings made up 10.7% of the total area while housing and buildings made up 11.6% and transportation infrastructure made up 12.7%. Power and water infrastructure as well as other special developed areas made up 4.0% of the area while parks, green belts and sports fields made up 1.4%. Out of the forested land, 22.0% of the total land area is heavily forested and 1.2% is covered with orchards or small clusters of trees. Of the agricultural land, 19.7% is used for growing crops and 14.7% is pastures. All the water in the municipality is flowing water.

The municipality is located in the Sarine district, neighboring Fribourg.

== Coat of arms ==
The blazon of the municipal coat of arms is Per fess Or a semi Lion rampant issuant Azure langued Gules and of the last.

== Demographics ==
Givisiez has a population (as of December 2020) of 3,143. As of 2008, 28.8% of the population are resident foreign nationals. Over the last 10 years (2000–2010) the population has changed at a rate of 59.2%. Migration accounted for 47.3%, while births and deaths accounted for 11.9%.

Most of the population (as of 2000) speaks French (1,675 or 73.1%) as their first language, German is the second most common (332 or 14.5%) and Italian is the third (62 or 2.7%).

As of 2008, the population was 50.1% male and 49.9% female. The population was made up of 1,116 Swiss men (33.6% of the population) and 550 (16.5%) non-Swiss men. There were 1,205 Swiss women (36.2%) and 454 (13.7%) non-Swiss women. Of the population in the municipality, 288 or about 12.6% were born in Givisiez and lived there in 2000. There were 985 or 43.0% who were born in the same canton, while 432 or 18.9% were born somewhere else in Switzerland, and 493 or 21.5% were born outside of Switzerland.

As of 2000, children and teenagers (0–19 years old) make up 23.4% of the population, while adults (20–64 years old) make up 66.7% and seniors (over 64 years old) make up 10%.

As of 2000, there were 1,196 people who were single and never married in the municipality. There were 885 married individuals, 105 widows or widowers and 105 individuals who are divorced.

As of 2000, there were 828 private households in the municipality, and an average of 2.5 persons per household. There were 241 households that consist of only one person and 61 households with five or more people. In 2000, a total of 817 apartments (94.7% of the total) were permanently occupied, while 29 apartments (3.4%) were seasonally occupied and 17 apartments (2.0%) were empty. As of 2009, the construction rate of new housing units was 3 new units per 1000 residents.

The historical population is given in the following chart:

== Heritage sites of national significance ==
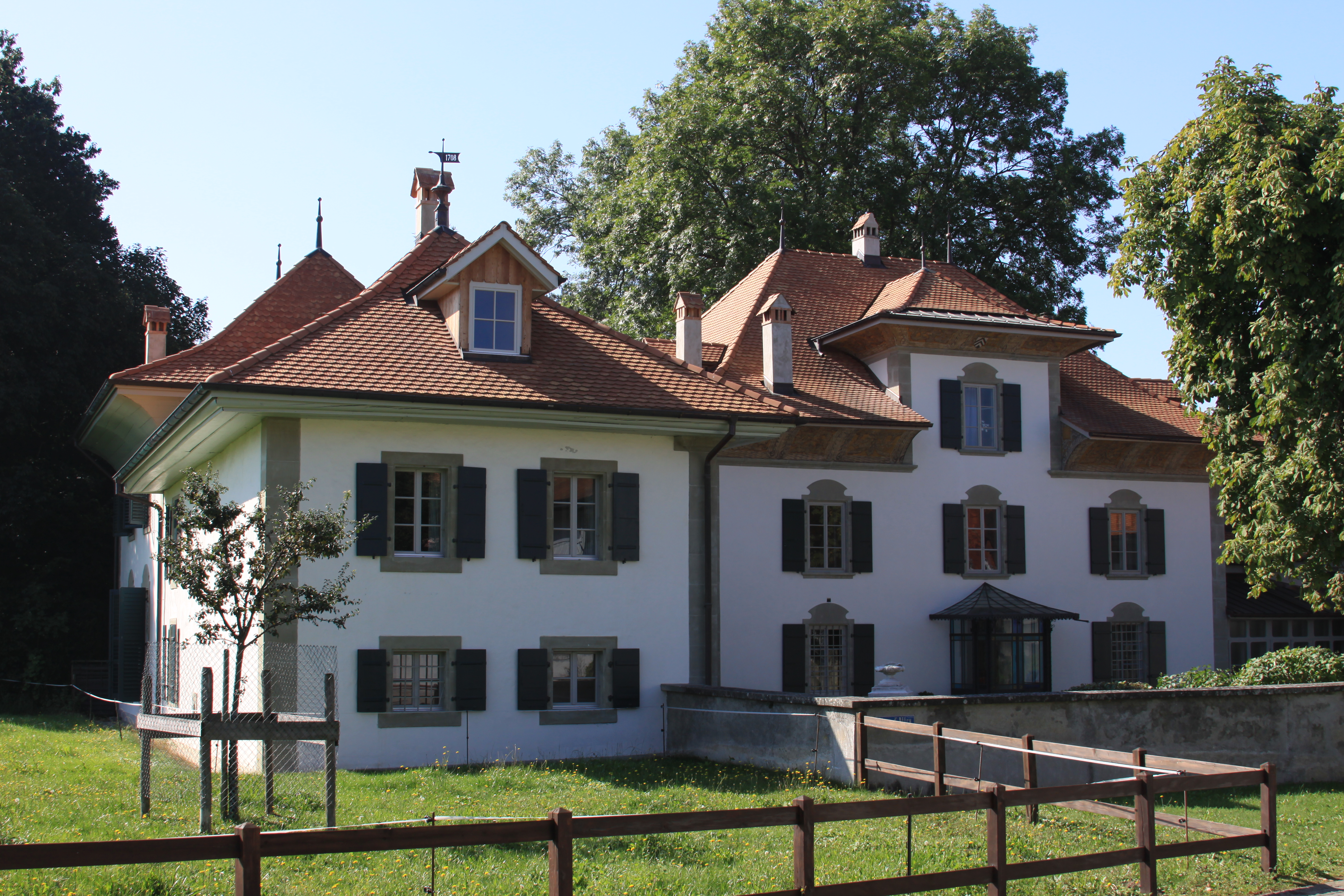
D'Affry Mansion

D’Affry mansion and the workshop of the sculptor Marcello is listed as a Swiss heritage site of national significance.

The mansion was built in 1539 for the D'Affry family and was extensively renovated in the 17th century.

== Politics ==
In the 2011 federal election the most popular party was the SPS which received 31.9% of the vote. The next three most popular parties were the CVP (22.5%), the SVP (18.5%) and the FDP (9.8%).

The SPS received about the same percentage of the vote as they did in the 2007 Federal election (31.1% in 2007 vs 31.9% in 2011). The CVP retained about the same popularity (26.8% in 2007), the SVP retained about the same popularity (17.0% in 2007) and the FDP retained about the same popularity (13.5% in 2007). A total of 771 votes were cast in this election, of which 18 or 2.3% were invalid.

== Economy ==
As of 2010, Givisiez had an unemployment rate of 6.3%. As of 2008, there were 8 people employed in the primary economic sector and about 3 businesses involved in this sector. 773 people were employed in the secondary sector and there were 35 businesses in this sector. 2,932 people were employed in the tertiary sector, with 208 businesses in this sector. There were 1,122 residents of the municipality who were employed in some capacity, of which females made up 44.7% of the workforce.

In 2008 the total number of full-time equivalent jobs was 3,202. The number of jobs in the primary sector was 5, all of which were in agriculture. The number of jobs in the secondary sector was 732 of which 504 or (68.9%) were in manufacturing and 213 (29.1%) were in construction. The number of jobs in the tertiary sector was 2,465. In the tertiary sector; 868 or 35.2% were in wholesale or retail sales or the repair of motor vehicles, 176 or 7.1% were in the movement and storage of goods, 43 or 1.7% were in a hotel or restaurant, 167 or 6.8% were in the information industry, 113 or 4.6% were the insurance or financial industry, 244 or 9.9% were technical professionals or scientists, 77 or 3.1% were in education and 217 or 8.8% were in health care.

In 2000, there were 2,934 workers who commuted into the municipality and 836 workers who commuted away. The municipality is a net importer of workers, with about 3.5 workers entering the municipality for every one leaving. Of the working population, 17.6% used public transportation to get to work, and 63.8% used a private car.

== Religion ==
From the 2000 census, 1,762 or 76.9% were Roman Catholic, while 189 or 8.2% belonged to the Swiss Reformed Church. Of the rest of the population, there were 26 members of an Orthodox church (or about 1.13% of the population), and there were 25 individuals (or about 1.09% of the population) who belonged to another Christian church. There were 2 individuals (or about 0.09% of the population) who were Jewish, and 39 (or about 1.70% of the population) who were Islamic. There were 3 individuals who were Buddhist and 4 individuals who were Hindu. 156 (or about 6.81% of the population) belonged to no church, are agnostic or atheist, and 93 individuals (or about 4.06% of the population) did not answer the question.

== Education ==
In Givisiez about 923 or (40.3%) of the population have completed non-mandatory upper secondary education, and 340 or (14.8%) have completed additional higher education (either university or a Fachhochschule). Of the 340 who completed tertiary schooling, 55.9% were Swiss men, 22.9% were Swiss women, 12.6% were non-Swiss men and 8.5% were non-Swiss women.

The Canton of Fribourg school system provides one year of non-obligatory Kindergarten, followed by six years of Primary school. This is followed by three years of obligatory lower Secondary school where the students are separated according to ability and aptitude. Following the lower Secondary students may attend a three or four year optional upper Secondary school. The upper Secondary school is divided into gymnasium (university preparatory) and vocational programs. After they finish the upper Secondary program, students may choose to attend a Tertiary school or continue their apprenticeship.

During the 2010–11 school year, there were a total of 232 students attending 13 classes in Givisiez. A total of 498 students from the municipality attended any school, either in the municipality or outside of it. There were 3 kindergarten classes with a total of 69 students in the municipality. The municipality had 8 primary classes and 155 students. During the same year, there were no lower secondary classes in the municipality, but 89 students attended lower secondary school in a neighboring municipality. There were no upper Secondary classes or vocational classes, but there were 64 upper Secondary students and 74 upper Secondary vocational students who attended classes in another municipality. The municipality had 2 special Tertiary classes, with 8 specialized Tertiary students.

As of 2000, there were 41 students in Givisiez who came from another municipality, while 374 residents attended schools outside the municipality.

Givisiez is home to the Bibliothèque de la Haute Ecole fribourgeoise de travail social library. The library has (as of 2008) 9,727 books or other media, and loaned out 7,012 items in the same year. It was open a total of 245 days with average of 49 hours per week during that year.

== Transportation ==
The municipality has a railway station, Givisiez. It is located on the Fribourg–Ins and Fribourg–Yverdon lines and has regular service to Fribourg/Freiburg, Yverdon-les-Bains, Ins, and Neuchâtel.
