= La Sonnaz =

- Municipality
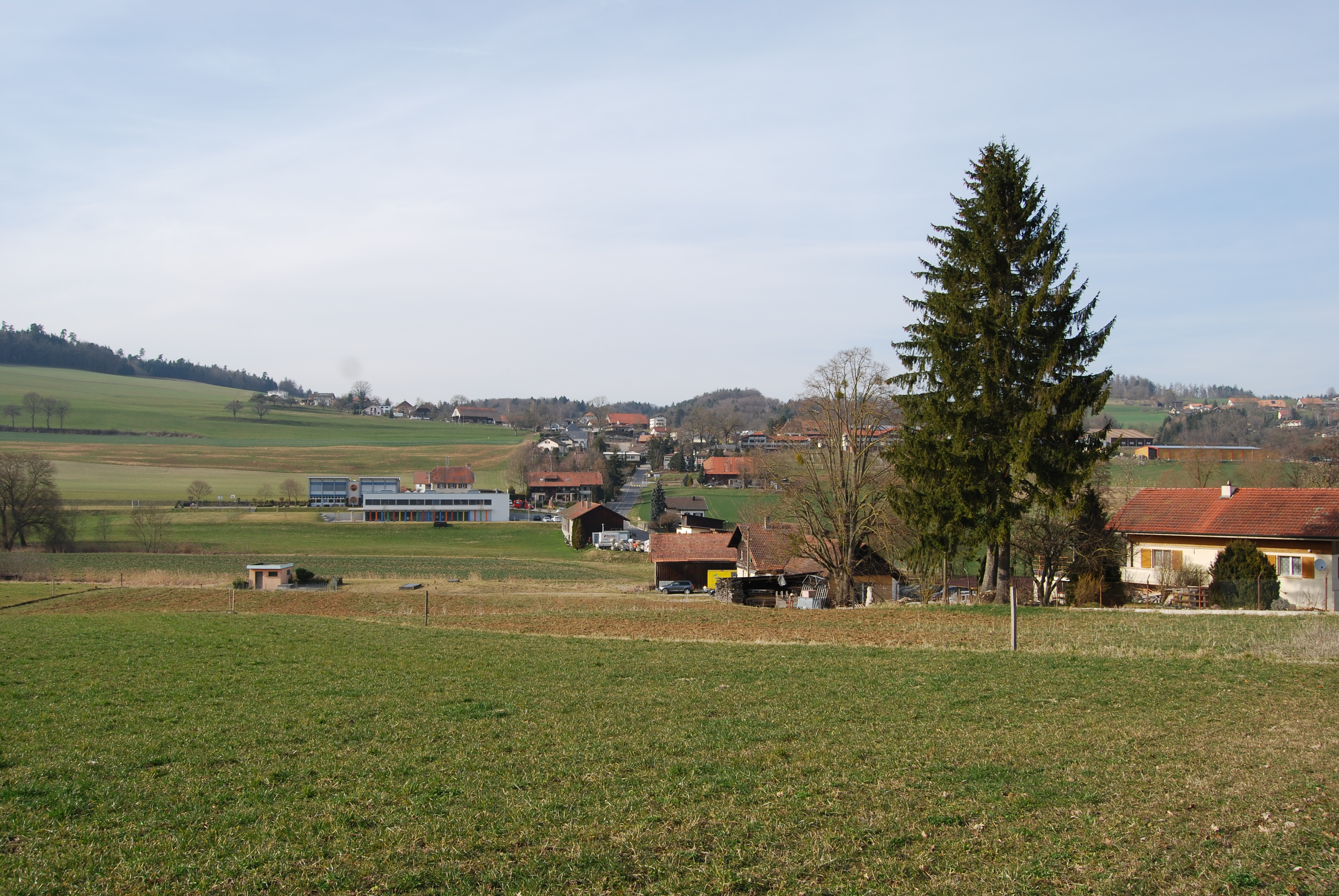

- Coat of arms
- Location of La Sonnaz
- Location within Switzerland Location within Canton of Fribourg
- Coordinates: 46°50′N 7°7′E
- Country: Switzerland
- Canton: Fribourg
- District: Sarine

Government
  - Mayor: Syndic

Area
  - Total: 6.90 km^{2} (2.66 sq mi)
- Elevation: 575 m (1,886 ft)

Population (December 2020)
  - Total: 1,233
  - Density: 179/km^{2} (463/sq mi)
- Time zone: UTC+01:00 (CET)
  - Summer (DST): UTC+02:00 (CEST)
- Postal code: 1782
- SFOS number: 2235
- ISO 3166 code: CH-FR
- Surrounded by: Barberêche, Belfaux, Düdingen, Givisiez, Granges-Paccot, Misery-Courtion
- Website: www.lasonnaz.ch

La Sonnaz (French pronunciation: [la sɔna]) is a municipality in the district of Sarine in the canton of Fribourg in Switzerland. The municipality was created in 2004 through the merger of Cormagens, La Corbaz and Lossy-Formangueires. The municipal administration, the kindergarten and the primary school are in Lossy.

== Geography ==
La Sonnaz has an area, as of 2009, of 6.9 square kilometers (2.7 mi^{2}). Of this area, 4.58 km^{2} (1.77 mi^{2}) or 66.4% is used for agricultural purposes, while 1.53 km^{2} (0.59 mi^{2}) or 22.2% is forested. Of the rest of the land, 0.51 km^{2} (0.20 mi^{2}) or 7.4% is settled (buildings or roads), 0.28 km^{2} (0.11 mi^{2}) or 4.1% is either rivers or lakes.

Of the developed area, housing and buildings made up 4.6% and transportation infrastructure made up 1.9%. Out of the forested land, 20.4% of the total land area is heavily forested and 1.7% is covered with orchards or small clusters of trees. Of the agricultural land, 43.6% is used for growing crops and 22.3% is pastures. All the water in the municipality is in lakes.

== Demographics ==
La Sonnaz has a population (as of December 2020) of 1,233. As of 2008, 8.1% of the population are resident foreign nationals. Over the last 10 years (2000–2010) the population has changed at a rate of 21.4%. Migration accounted for 15.3%, while births and deaths accounted for 9.2%.

Most of the population (as of 2000) speaks French (88.6%) as their first language, German is the second most common (9.1%) and Portuguese is the third (0.9%).

As of 2008, the population was 49.7% male and 50.3% female. The population was made up of 448 Swiss men (45.8% of the population) and 39 (4.0%) non-Swiss men. There were 458 Swiss women (46.8%) and 34 (3.5%) non-Swiss women. As of 2000, children and teenagers (0–19 years old) make up 32.1% of the population, while adults (20–64 years old) make up 59.6% and seniors (over 64 years old) make up 8.3%.

As of 2009, the construction rate of new housing units was 2 new units per 1000 residents.

== Politics ==
In the 2011 federal election the most popular party was the SPS which received 32.1% of the vote. The next three most popular parties were the CVP (23.0%), the SVP (15.0%) and the FDP (9.8%).

The SPS received about the same percentage of the vote as they did in the 2007 Federal election (31.9% in 2007 vs 32.1% in 2011). The CVP retained about the same popularity (26.0% in 2007), the SVP retained about the same popularity (15.9% in 2007) and the FDP retained about the same popularity (9.9% in 2007). A total of 356 votes were cast in this election, of which 4 or 1.1% were invalid.

== Economy ==
As of 2010, La Sonnaz had an unemployment rate of 1.8%. As of 2008, there were 54 people employed in the primary economic sector and about 17 businesses involved in this sector. 55 people were employed in the secondary sector and there were 9 businesses in this sector. 59 people were employed in the tertiary sector, with 16 businesses in this sector. There were residents of the municipality who were employed in some capacity.

In 2008 the total number of full-time equivalent jobs was 131. The number of jobs in the primary sector was 41, all of which were in agriculture. The number of jobs in the secondary sector was 51 of which 41 or (80.4%) were in manufacturing and 11 (21.6%) were in construction. The number of jobs in the tertiary sector was 39. In the tertiary sector; 3 or 7.7% were in wholesale or retail sales or the repair of motor vehicles, 7 or 17.9% were in a hotel or restaurant, 3 or 7.7% were in the information industry, 6 or 15.4% were technical professionals or scientists, 19 or 48.7% were in education. In 2000, there were workers who commuted away from the municipality.

Of the working population, 6.4% used public transportation to get to work, and 73.5% used a private car.

== Education ==
The Canton of Fribourg school system provides one year of non-obligatory Kindergarten, followed by six years of Primary school. This is followed by three years of obligatory lower Secondary school where the students are separated according to ability and aptitude. Following the lower Secondary students may attend a three or four year optional upper Secondary school. The upper Secondary school is divided into gymnasium (university preparatory) and vocational programs. After they finish the upper Secondary program, students may choose to attend a Tertiary school or continue their apprenticeship.

During the 2010–11 school year, there were a total of 126 students attending 7 classes in La Sonnaz. A total of 247 students from the municipality attended any school, either in the municipality or outside of it. There were 2 kindergarten classes with a total of 28 students in the municipality. The municipality had 5 primary classes and 98 students. During the same year, there were no lower secondary classes in the municipality, but 56 students attended lower secondary school in a neighboring municipality. There were no upper Secondary classes or vocational classes, but there were 27 upper Secondary students and 31 upper Secondary vocational students who attended classes in another municipality. The municipality had no non-university Tertiary classes, but there were 2 non-university Tertiary students and 3 specialized Tertiary students who attended classes in another municipality.
