= List of mayors of Villars-sur-Glâne =

Coat of arms of Villars-sur-Glâne

This is a list of mayors of Villars-sur-Glâne, Canton of Fribourg, Switzerland. The executive of Villars-sur-Glâne is the municipal council (Conseil communal). It is presided by the mayor (Syndic de Villars-sur-Glâne).

Mayor of Villars-sur-Glâne
Term	Mayor	Lifespan	Party	Notes
1899–1944	Aimé Roubaty	(1875–1944)	Parti conservateur	
1944–1958	Irénée Mauron		Parti conservateur	
1958–1974	François Macheret		PDC/CVP	
1974–1996	Germain Bouverat		PDC/CVP	
1996–2006	Philippe Uldry		PRD/FDP	
2006–2021	Erika Schnyder		PSS/SPS	
2021–present	Bruno Marmier		PES/GPS	
