= Granges-Paccot =

- Municipality
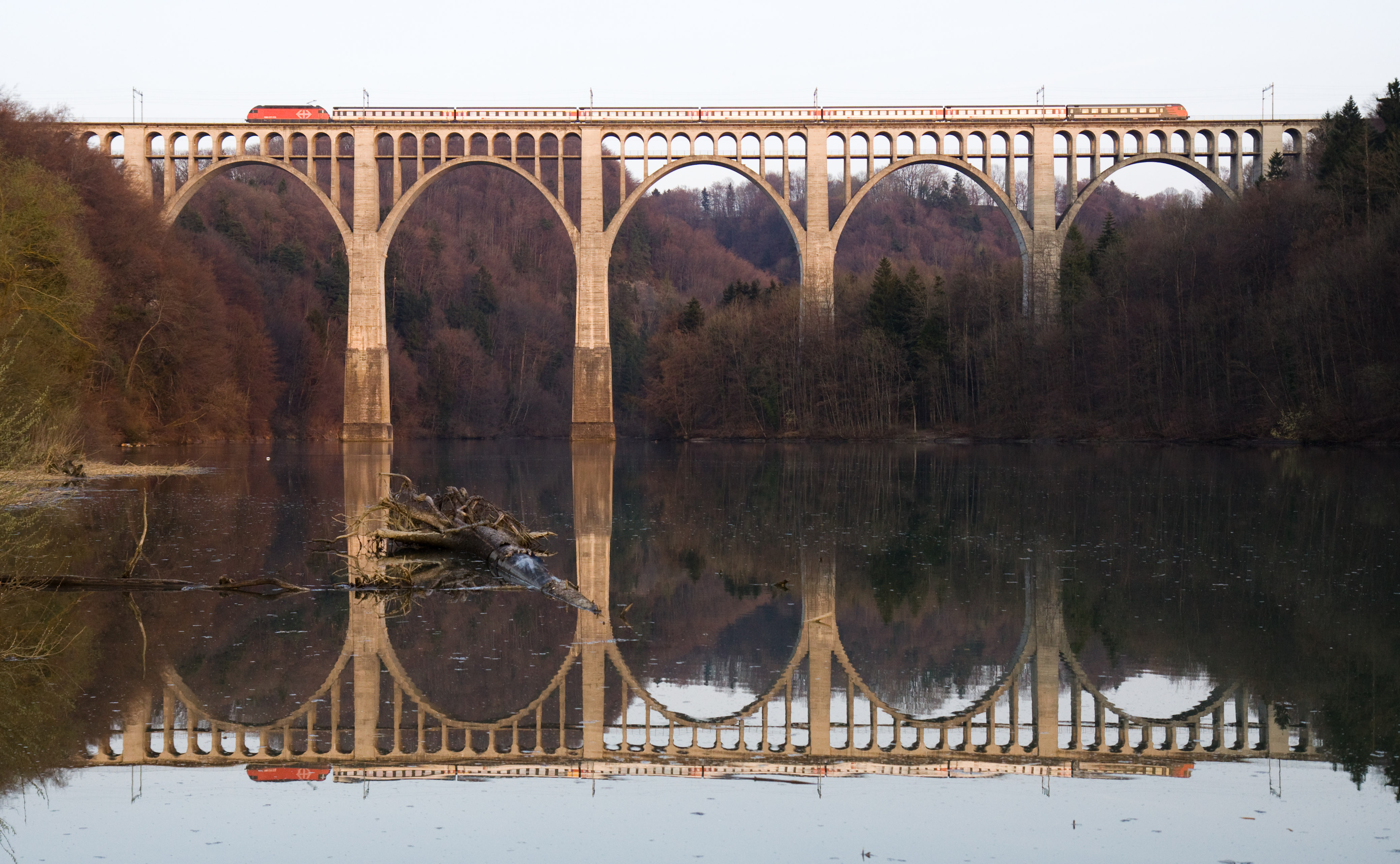
- Grandfey bridge near Granges-Paccot

- Coat of arms
- Location of Granges-Paccot
- Location within Switzerland Location within Canton of Fribourg
- Coordinates: 46°49′N 7°9′E
- Country: Switzerland
- Canton: Fribourg
- District: Sarine

Government
  - Mayor: Syndic

Area
  - Total: 3.98 km^{2} (1.54 sq mi)
- Elevation: 620 m (2,030 ft)

Population (December 2020)
  - Total: 3,839
  - Density: 965/km^{2} (2,500/sq mi)
- Time zone: UTC+01:00 (CET)
  - Summer (DST): UTC+02:00 (CEST)
- Postal code: 1763
- SFOS number: 2198
- ISO 3166 code: CH-FR
- Surrounded by: Düdingen, Fribourg (Fribourg/Freiburg im Üechtland), Givisiez, La Sonnaz
- Website: granges-paccot.ch

Granges-Paccot (French: [ɡʁɑ̃ʒ pako]; Arpitan: Granges-Pacot [ˈɡʁɑ̃dzɛ ˈpako] is a municipality in the district of Sarine in the canton of Fribourg in Switzerland.

== History ==
Granges-Paccot is first mentioned in 1317 as Grangiarum ante la mota dicti castri. The municipality was formerly known by its German name Zur Schüren, however, that name is no longer used.

== Geography ==
Granges-Paccot has an area, as of 2009, of 4 square kilometers (1.5 mi^{2}). Of this area, 1.82 km^{2} (0.70 mi^{2}) or 45.5% is used for agricultural purposes, while 0.61 km^{2} (0.24 mi^{2}) or 15.3% is forested. Of the rest of the land, 1.24 km^{2} (0.48 mi^{2}) or 31.0% is settled (buildings or roads), 0.31 km^{2} (0.12 mi^{2}) or 7.8% is either rivers or lakes.

Of the built up area, industrial buildings made up 3.8% of the total area while housing and buildings made up 11.5% and transportation infrastructure made up 11.5%. Power and water infrastructure as well as other special developed areas made up 2.3% of the area while parks, green belts and sports fields made up 2.0%. Out of the forested land, all of the forested land area is covered with heavy forests. Of the agricultural land, 31.8% is used for growing crops and 12.3% is pastures, while 1.5% is used for orchards or vine crops. All the water in the municipality is in lakes.

The municipality is located in the Sarine district, north of Fribourg and on the left side of the river.

== Coat of arms ==
The blazon of the municipal coat of arms is Per fess Or a semi Lion rampant issuant Azure langued Gules and of the last on a Bar wavy Argent a Fish nainaint of the second.

== Demographics ==
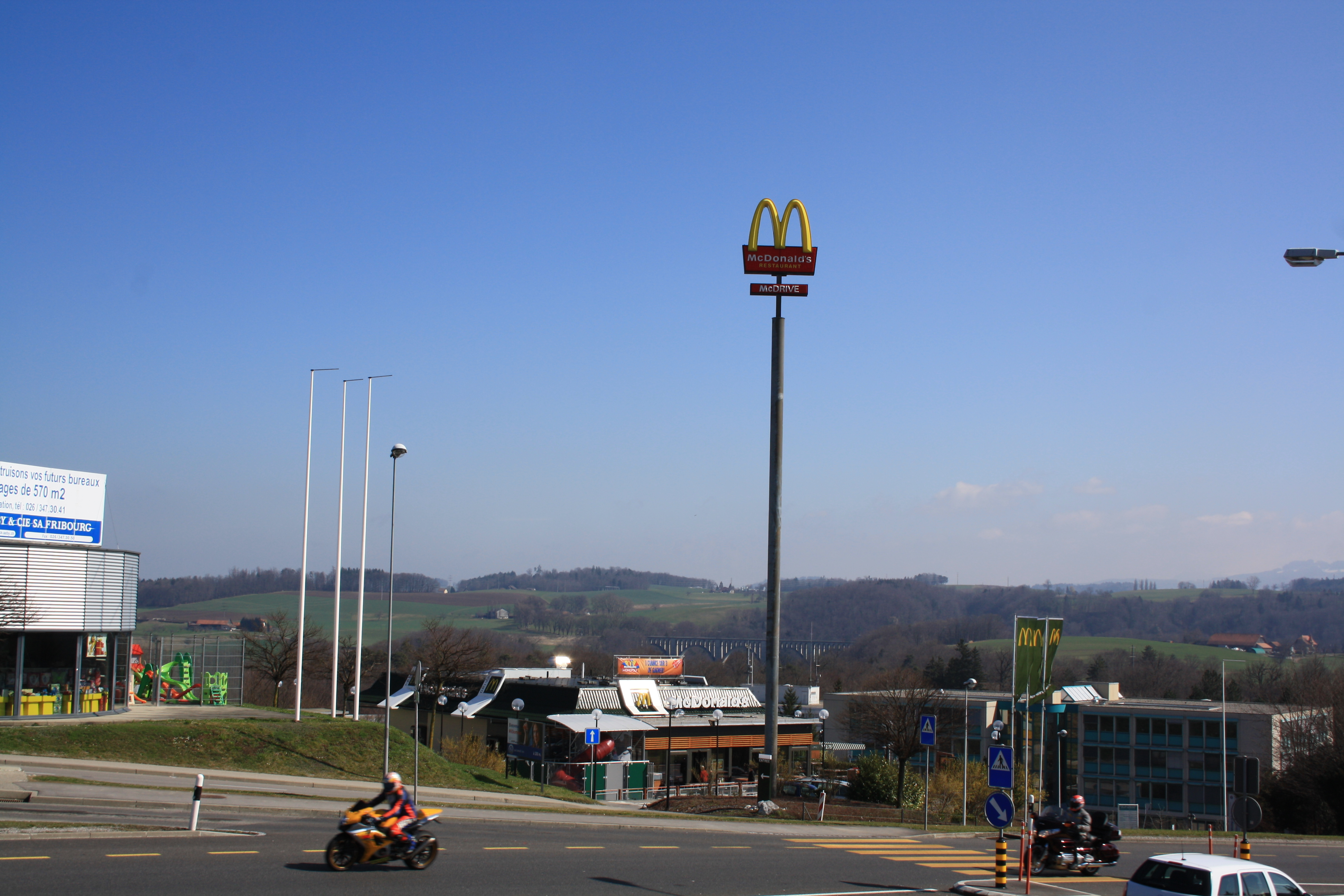
Granges-Paccot

Granges-Paccot has a population (as of December 2020) of 3,839. As of 2008, 26.3% of the population are resident foreign nationals. Over the last 10 years (2000–2010) the population has changed at a rate of 26.7%. Migration accounted for 13.1%, while births and deaths accounted for 10.3%.

Most of the population (as of 2000) speaks French (1,552 or 76.0%) as their first language, German is the second most common (304 or 14.9%) and Italian is the third (46 or 2.3%). There are 2 people who speak Romansh.

As of 2008, the population was 51.2% male and 48.8% female. The population was made up of 927 Swiss men (36.5% of the population) and 373 (14.7%) non-Swiss men. There were 912 Swiss women (35.9%) and 329 (12.9%) non-Swiss women. Of the population in the municipality, 403 or about 19.7% were born in Granges-Paccot and lived there in 2000. There were 941 or 46.1% who were born in the same canton, while 281 or 13.8% were born somewhere else in Switzerland, and 381 or 18.7% were born outside of Switzerland.

As of 2000, children and teenagers (0–19 years old) make up 25.7% of the population, while adults (20–64 years old) make up 66.1% and seniors (over 64 years old) make up 8.2%.

As of 2000, there were 941 people who were single and never married in the municipality. There were 933 married individuals, 64 widows or widowers and 104 individuals who are divorced.

As of 2000, there were 859 private households in the municipality, and an average of 2.4 persons per household. There were 280 households that consist of only one person and 57 households with five or more people. In 2000, a total of 835 apartments (91.7% of the total) were permanently occupied, while 63 apartments (6.9%) were seasonally occupied and 13 apartments (1.4%) were empty. As of 2009, the construction rate of new housing units was 20.2 new units per 1000 residents. The vacancy rate for the municipality, in 2010, was 1.72%.

The historical population is given in the following chart:

== Heritage sites of national significance ==
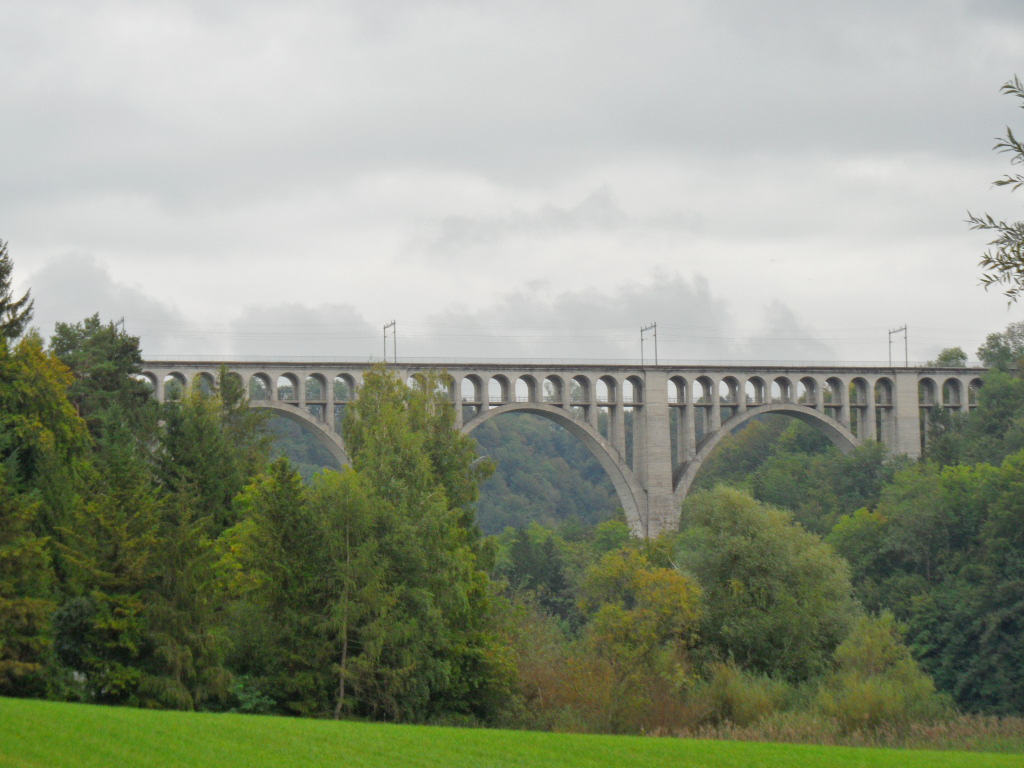
Grandfey Bridge

The Viaduc De Grandfey (Grandfey Bridge), which is shared with Düdingen, is listed as a Swiss heritage site of national significance.

== Politics ==
In the 2011 federal election the most popular party was the SPS which received 30.6% of the vote. The next three most popular parties were the CVP (21.1%), the SVP (20.7%) and the FDP (8.0%).

The SPS received about the same percentage of the vote as they did in the 2007 Federal election (31.1% in 2007 vs 30.6% in 2011). The CVP retained about the same popularity (23.2% in 2007), the SVP retained about the same popularity (18.6% in 2007) and the FDP retained about the same popularity (10.6% in 2007). A total of 533 votes were cast in this election, of which 10 or 1.9% were invalid.

== Economy ==
As of 2010, Granges-Paccot had an unemployment rate of 4.6%. As of 2008, there were 24 people employed in the primary economic sector and about 8 businesses involved in this sector. 432 people were employed in the secondary sector and there were 30 businesses in this sector. 2,474 people were employed in the tertiary sector, with 159 businesses in this sector. There were 1,176 residents of the municipality who were employed in some capacity, of which females made up 45.5% of the workforce.

In 2008 the total number of full-time equivalent jobs was 2,438. The number of jobs in the primary sector was 21, all of which were in agriculture. The number of jobs in the secondary sector was 412 of which 275 or (66.7%) were in manufacturing and 105 (25.5%) were in construction. The number of jobs in the tertiary sector was 2,005. In the tertiary sector; 768 or 38.3% were in wholesale or retail sales or the repair of motor vehicles, 15 or 0.7% were in the movement and storage of goods, 108 or 5.4% were in a hotel or restaurant, 15 or 0.7% were in the information industry, 80 or 4.0% were the insurance or financial industry, 151 or 7.5% were technical professionals or scientists, 195 or 9.7% were in education and 13 or 0.6% were in health care.

In 2000, there were 1,820 workers who commuted into the municipality and 933 workers who commuted away. The municipality is a net importer of workers, with about 2.0 workers entering the municipality for every one leaving. Of the working population, 18.6% used public transportation to get to work, and 63.9% used a private car.

== Religion ==
From the 2000 census, 1,613 or 79.0% were Roman Catholic, while 172 or 8.4% belonged to the Swiss Reformed Church. Of the rest of the population, there were 23 members of an Orthodox church (or about 1.13% of the population), and there were 58 individuals (or about 2.84% of the population) who belonged to another Christian church. There were 58 (or about 2.84% of the population) who were Islamic. There were 14 individuals who were Buddhist and 6 individuals who were Hindu. 88 (or about 4.31% of the population) belonged to no church, are agnostic or atheist, and 37 individuals (or about 1.81% of the population) did not answer the question.

== Education ==
In Granges-Paccot about 746 or (36.5%) of the population have completed non-mandatory upper secondary education, and 284 or (13.9%) have completed additional higher education (either university or a Fachhochschule). Of the 284 who completed tertiary schooling, 56.0% were Swiss men, 26.1% were Swiss women, 11.6% were non-Swiss men and 6.3% were non-Swiss women.

The Canton of Fribourg school system provides one year of non-obligatory Kindergarten, followed by six years of Primary school. This is followed by three years of obligatory lower Secondary school where the students are separated according to ability and aptitude. Following the lower Secondary students may attend a three or four year optional upper Secondary school. The upper Secondary school is divided into gymnasium (university preparatory) and vocational programs. After they finish the upper Secondary program, students may choose to attend a Tertiary school or continue their apprenticeship.

During the 2010–11 school year, there were a total of 300 students attending 20 classes in Granges-Paccot. A total of 487 students from the municipality attended any school, either in the municipality or outside of it. There were 3 kindergarten classes with a total of 56 students in the municipality. The municipality had 9 primary classes and 154 students. During the same year, there were no lower secondary classes in the municipality, but 100 students attended lower secondary school in a neighboring municipality. There were no upper Secondary classes or vocational classes, but there were 62 upper Secondary students and 84 upper Secondary vocational students who attended classes in another municipality. The municipality had 8 non-university Tertiary classes, with 90 non-university Tertiary students.

As of 2000, there were 105 students in Granges-Paccot who came from another municipality, while 158 residents attended schools outside the municipality.
