= Villars-sur-Glâne =

- Municipality
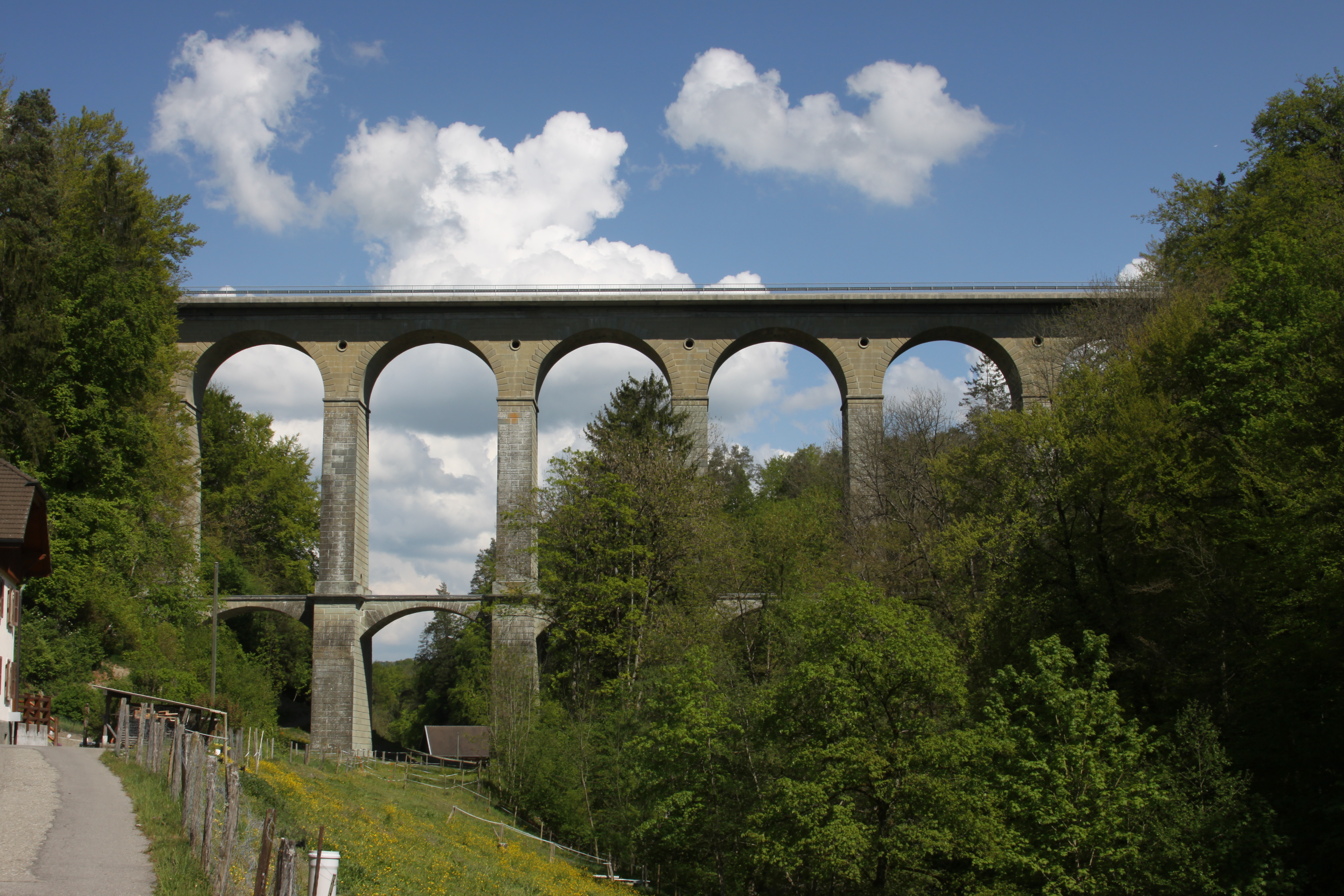
- Pont de la Glâne between Villars-sur-Glâne and Hauterive

- Flag Coat of arms
- Location of Villars-sur-Glâne
- Location within Switzerland Location within Canton of Fribourg
- Coordinates: 46°47′N 7°7′E
- Country: Switzerland
- Canton: Fribourg
- District: Sarine

Government
  - Executive: Conseil communal with 9 members
  - Mayor: Syndic (list)
  - Parliament: Conseil général with 50 members

Area
  - Total: 5.5 km^{2} (2.1 sq mi)
- Elevation: 659 m (2,162 ft)

Population (December 2020)
  - Total: 12,219
  - Density: 2,200/km^{2} (5,800/sq mi)
- Time zone: UTC+01:00 (CET)
  - Summer (DST): UTC+02:00 (CEST)
- Postal code: 1752
- SFOS number: 2228
- ISO 3166 code: CH-FR
- Surrounded by: Corminboeuf, Fribourg (Fribourg/Freiburg im Üechtland), Givisiez, Hauterive, Marly, Matran
- Website: www.villars-sur-glane.ch

Villars-sur-Glâne (French: [vilaʁ syʁ ɡlɑn]; Arpitan: Velârs-sur-Gllânna [vəˈlɑ ʃy ˈjɑ̃na]) is a municipality in the district of Sarine in the canton of Fribourg in Switzerland.

== Geography ==
Villars-sur-Glâne has an area, as of 2009, of 5.5 square kilometers (2.1 mi^{2}). Of this area, 1.61 km^{2} (0.62 mi^{2}) or 29.3% is used for agricultural purposes, while 0.96 km^{2} (0.37 mi^{2}) or 17.5% is forested. Of the rest of the land, 2.83 km^{2} (1.09 mi^{2}) or 51.5% is settled (buildings or roads), 0.07 km^{2} (17 acres) or 1.3% is either rivers or lakes.

Of the built up area, industrial buildings made up 4.9% of the total area while housing and buildings made up 27.7% and transportation infrastructure made up 13.8%. Power and water infrastructure as well as other special developed areas made up 2.7% of the area while parks, green belts and sports fields made up 2.4%. Out of the forested land, all of the forested land area is covered with heavy forests. Of the agricultural land, 16.8% is used for growing crops and 12.0% is pastures. All the water in the municipality is flowing water.

== Coat of arms ==
The blazon of the municipal coat of arms is Azure a Saltire Argent and in chief a Fleur de lis of the same.

== Demographics ==
Villars-sur-Glâne has a population (as of December 2020) of 12,219. As of 2008, 29.1% of the population are resident foreign nationals. Over the last 10 years (2000–2010) the population has changed at a rate of 22.6%. Migration accounted for 14.5%, while births and deaths accounted for 8.1%.

Most of the population (as of 2000) speaks French (7,211 or 77.2%) as their first language, German is the second most common (1,022 or 10.9%) and Portuguese is the third (216 or 2.3%). There are 185 people who speak Italian and 3 people who speak Romansh.

As of 2008, the population was 49.4% male and 50.6% female. The population was made up of 3,627 Swiss men (32.6% of the population) and 1,864 (16.8%) non-Swiss men. There were 4,057 Swiss women (36.5%) and 1,572 (14.1%) non-Swiss women. Of the population in the municipality, 1,760 or about 18.8% were born in Villars-sur-Glâne and lived there in 2000. There were 3,367 or 36.1% who were born in the same canton, while 1,500 or 16.1% were born somewhere else in Switzerland, and 2,405 or 25.8% were born outside of Switzerland.

As of 2000, children and teenagers (0–19 years old) make up 25.8% of the population, while adults (20–64 years old) make up 63.3% and seniors (over 64 years old) make up 10.9%.

As of 2000, there were 4,119 people who were single and never married in the municipality. There were 4,355 married individuals, 418 widows or widowers and 447 individuals who are divorced.

As of 2000, there were 3,644 private households in the municipality, and an average of 2.5 persons per household. There were 1,089 households that consist of only one person and 291 households with five or more people. In 2000, a total of 3,548 apartments (91.1% of the total) were permanently occupied, while 222 apartments (5.7%) were seasonally occupied and 125 apartments (3.2%) were empty. As of 2009, the construction rate of new housing units was 6.1 new units per 1000 residents. The vacancy rate for the municipality, in 2010, was 1.76%.

The historical population is given in the following chart:

== Heritage sites of national significance ==
The Farm House De La Campagne De Chollet Au Guintzet, the Pont (bridge) de la Glâne (shared with Hauterive) and the bridge and chapel of Sainte-Apolline (also shared with Hauterive) are listed as Swiss heritage site of national significance.

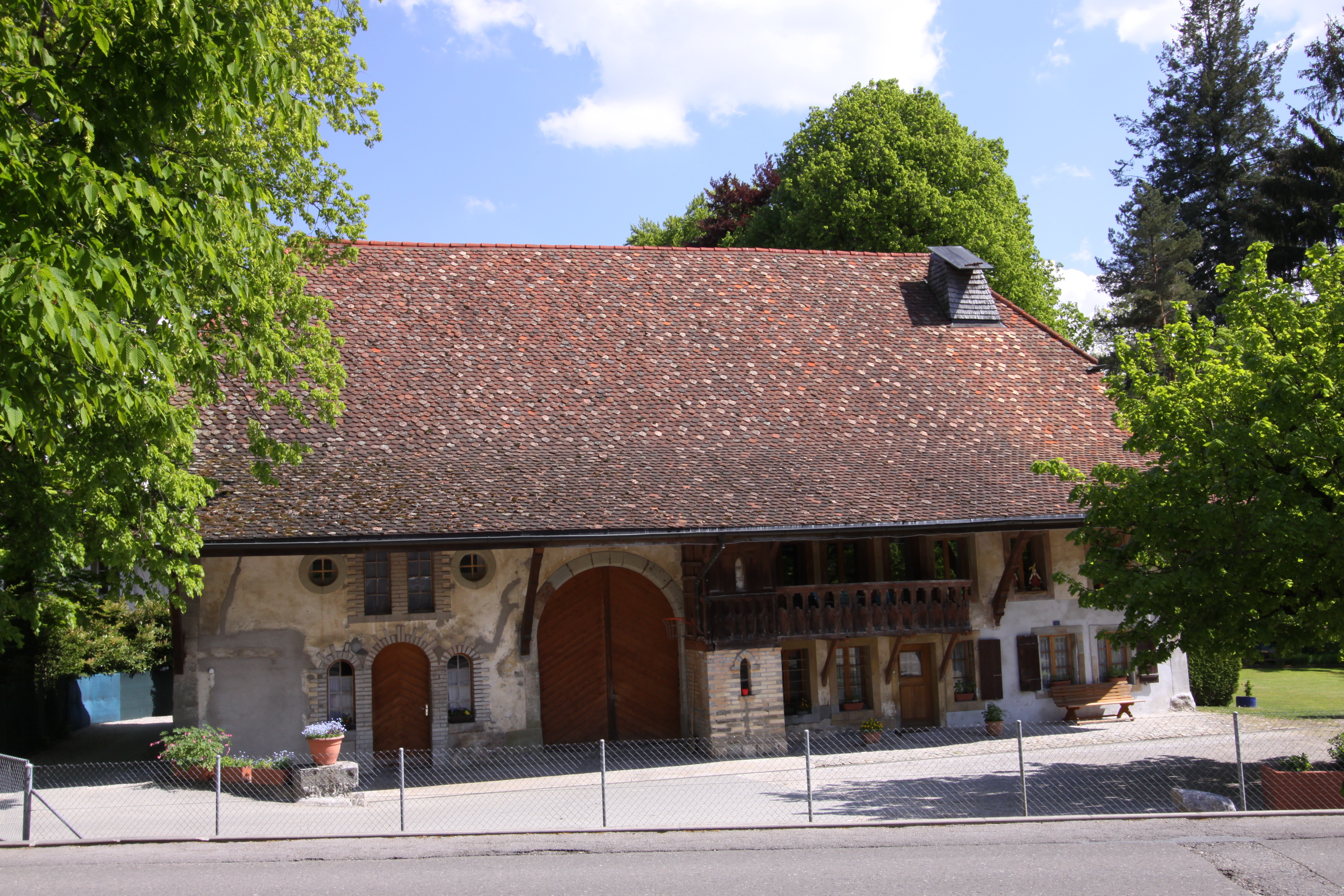
Farm House Chollot au Guintzet

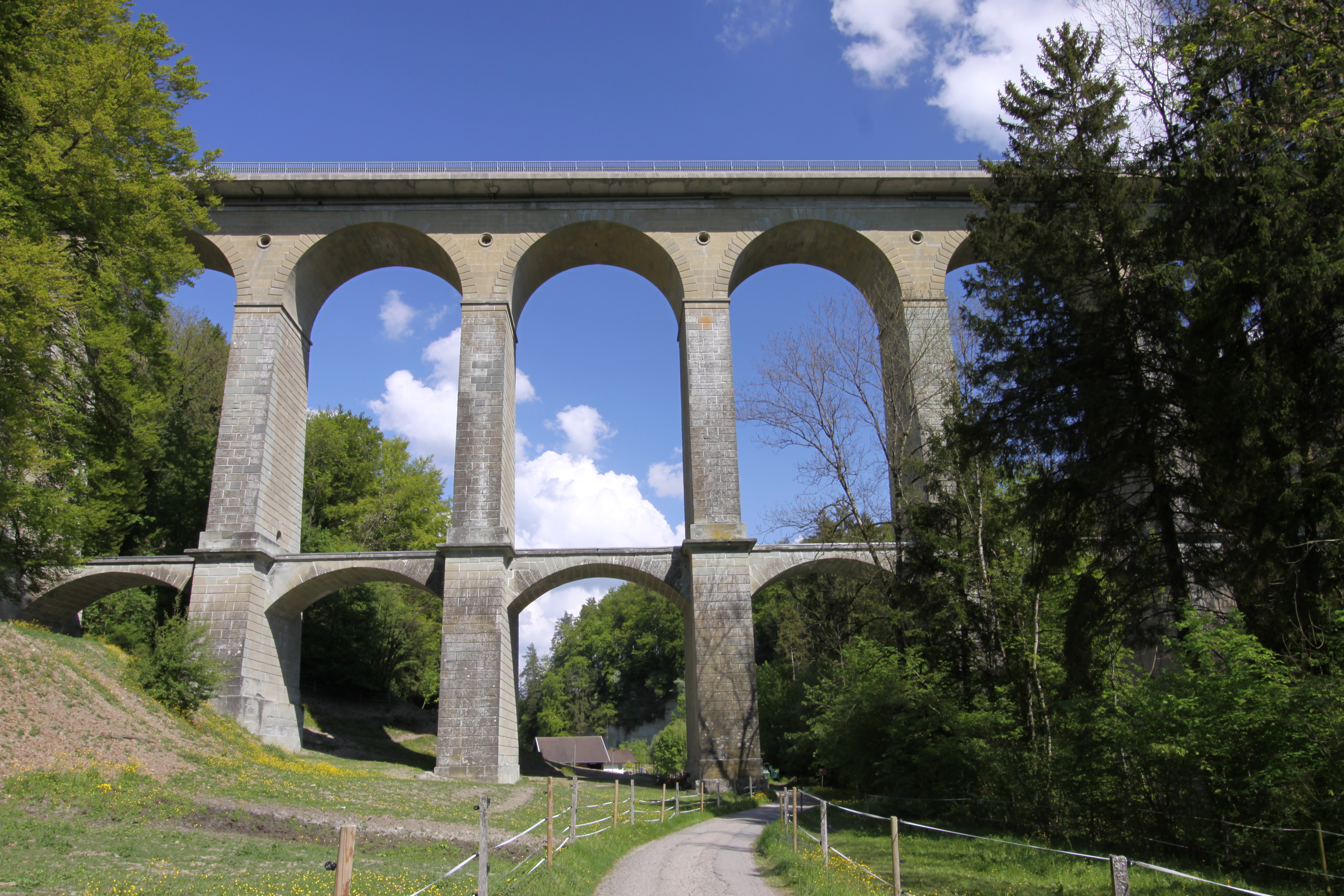
Pont de la Glâne2 May 2011

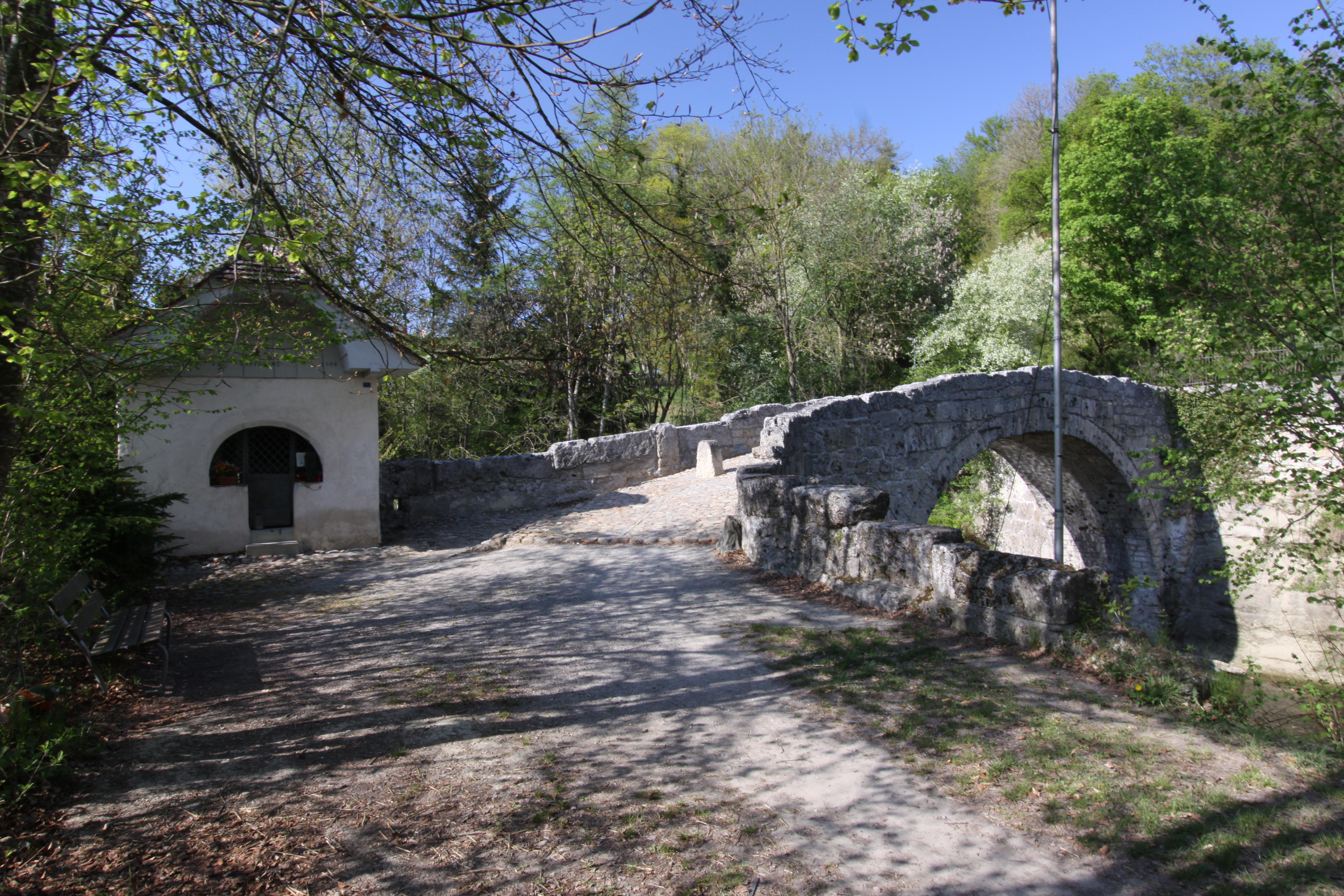
St. Apolline Bridge and Chapel

== Politics ==
In the 2011 federal election the most popular party was the SPS which received 33.4% of the vote. The next three most popular parties were the CVP (18.7%), the SVP (13.6%) and the FDP (11.2%).

The SPS received about the same percentage of the vote as they did in the 2007 Federal election (32.8% in 2007 vs 33.4% in 2011). The CVP retained about the same popularity (23.4% in 2007), the SVP retained about the same popularity (14.4% in 2007) and the FDP retained about the same popularity (13.3% in 2007). A total of 3,154 votes were cast in this election, of which 70 or 2.2% were invalid.

== Economy ==
As of 2010, Villars-sur-Glâne had an unemployment rate of 5.1%. As of 2008, there were 15 people employed in the primary economic sector and about 4 businesses involved in this sector. 2,130 people were employed in the secondary sector and there were 69 businesses in this sector. 5,501 people were employed in the tertiary sector, with 327 businesses in this sector. There were 4,764 residents of the municipality who were employed in some capacity, of which females made up 45.1% of the workforce.

In 2008 the total number of full-time equivalent jobs was 6,559. The number of jobs in the primary sector was 8, all of which were in agriculture. The number of jobs in the secondary sector was 2,029 of which 1,698 or (83.7%) were in manufacturing and 323 (15.9%) were in construction. The number of jobs in the tertiary sector was 4,522. In the tertiary sector; 1,018 or 22.5% were in wholesale or retail sales or the repair of motor vehicles, 330 or 7.3% were in the movement and storage of goods, 119 or 2.6% were in a hotel or restaurant, 195 or 4.3% were in the information industry, 282 or 6.2% were the insurance or financial industry, 271 or 6.0% were technical professionals or scientists, 166 or 3.7% were in education and 1,886 or 41.7% were in health care.

In 2000, there were 4,728 workers who commuted into the municipality and 3,504 workers who commuted away. The municipality is a net importer of workers, with about 1.3 workers entering the municipality for every one leaving. Of the working population, 29.3% used public transportation to get to work, and 54.5% used a private car.

== Religion ==
From the 2000 census, 6,633 or 71.0% were Roman Catholic, while 727 or 7.8% belonged to the Swiss Reformed Church. Of the rest of the population, there were 107 members of an Orthodox church (or about 1.15% of the population), there were 13 individuals (or about 0.14% of the population) who belonged to the Christian Catholic Church, and there were 220 individuals (or about 2.36% of the population) who belonged to another Christian church. There were 14 individuals (or about 0.15% of the population) who were Jewish, and 500 (or about 5.35% of the population) who were Islamic. There were 24 individuals who were Buddhist, 47 individuals who were Hindu and 9 individuals who belonged to another church. 640 (or about 6.85% of the population) belonged to no church, are agnostic or atheist, and 510 individuals (or about 5.46% of the population) did not answer the question.

== Education ==
In Villars-sur-Glâne about 2,794 or (29.9%) of the population have completed non-mandatory upper secondary education, and 1,707 or (18.3%) have completed additional higher education (either university or a Fachhochschule). Of the 1,707 who completed tertiary schooling, 54.8% were Swiss men, 27.6% were Swiss women, 10.4% were non-Swiss men and 7.2% were non-Swiss women.

The Canton of Fribourg school system provides one year of non-obligatory Kindergarten, followed by six years of Primary school. This is followed by three years of obligatory lower Secondary school where the students are separated according to ability and aptitude. Following the lower Secondary students may attend a three or four year optional upper Secondary school. The upper Secondary school is divided into gymnasium (university preparatory) and vocational programs. After they finish the upper Secondary program, students may choose to attend a Tertiary school or continue their apprenticeship.

During the 2010–11 school year, there were a total of 1,325 students attending 90 classes in Villars-sur-Glâne. A total of 2,153 students from the municipality attended any school, either in the municipality or outside of it. There were 13 kindergarten classes with a total of 269 students in the municipality. The municipality had 38 primary classes and 731 students. During the same year, there were no lower secondary classes in the municipality, but 438 students attended lower secondary school in a neighboring municipality. There were no upper Secondary classes or vocational classes, but there were 331 upper Secondary students and 233 upper Secondary vocational students who attended classes in another municipality. The municipality had 39 special Tertiary classes, with 325 specialized Tertiary students.

As of 2000, there were 202 students in Villars-sur-Glâne who came from another municipality, while 933 residents attended schools outside the municipality.

== Transportation ==
The municipality has a railway station, Villars-sur-Glâne, on the Lausanne–Bern line. It has regular service to Romont FR and Fribourg/Freiburg.

== Notable people ==
- Massimo Colomba (born 1977 in Villars-sur-Glâne), former football goalkeeper, over 300 club caps
- Natan Jurkovitz (born 1995), French-Swiss-Israeli basketball player for Hapoel Be'er Sheva of the Israeli Basketball Premier League
- Marie-Luce Romanens (born 1973), former orienteering competitor and long-distance runner, now settled in Villars-sur-Glâne as a biology and chemistry teacher
