= Evangelical Reformed Church of the Canton Freiburg =

Coordinates: 46.9287°N 7.1221°E

The Evangelical Reformed Church of the Canton Freiburg is a cantonal Reformed state church in Fribourg. In 2004, it had 16 parishes and 38,000 members, served by 35 ministers. It was officially organised in 1530. The official languages are French and German. Three parishes are dual language, five are French-speaking, and eight are German-speaking.

In 1530, Murten, Kerzers, Motier, Meyriez, and Ferenbalm converted to the Reformed faith. The other parts of Freiburg stayed Roman Catholic. In 1854, the Reformed Church planted more congregations. In the 19th century, Reformed churches and schools were planted. In 2001 in Romont, Chatel-St. Denis was divided into 2 separate parishes. Women's ordination is allowed.
