= GoldenPass Line =

Train route in the Swiss Alps

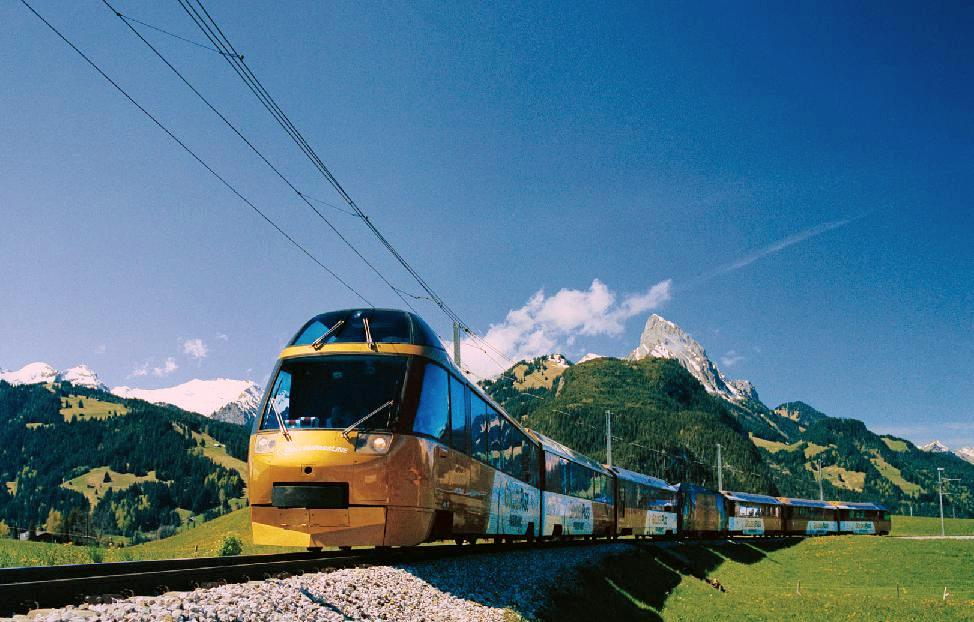
The Golden Pass Panoramic Express near Gstaad (with seating on the front)

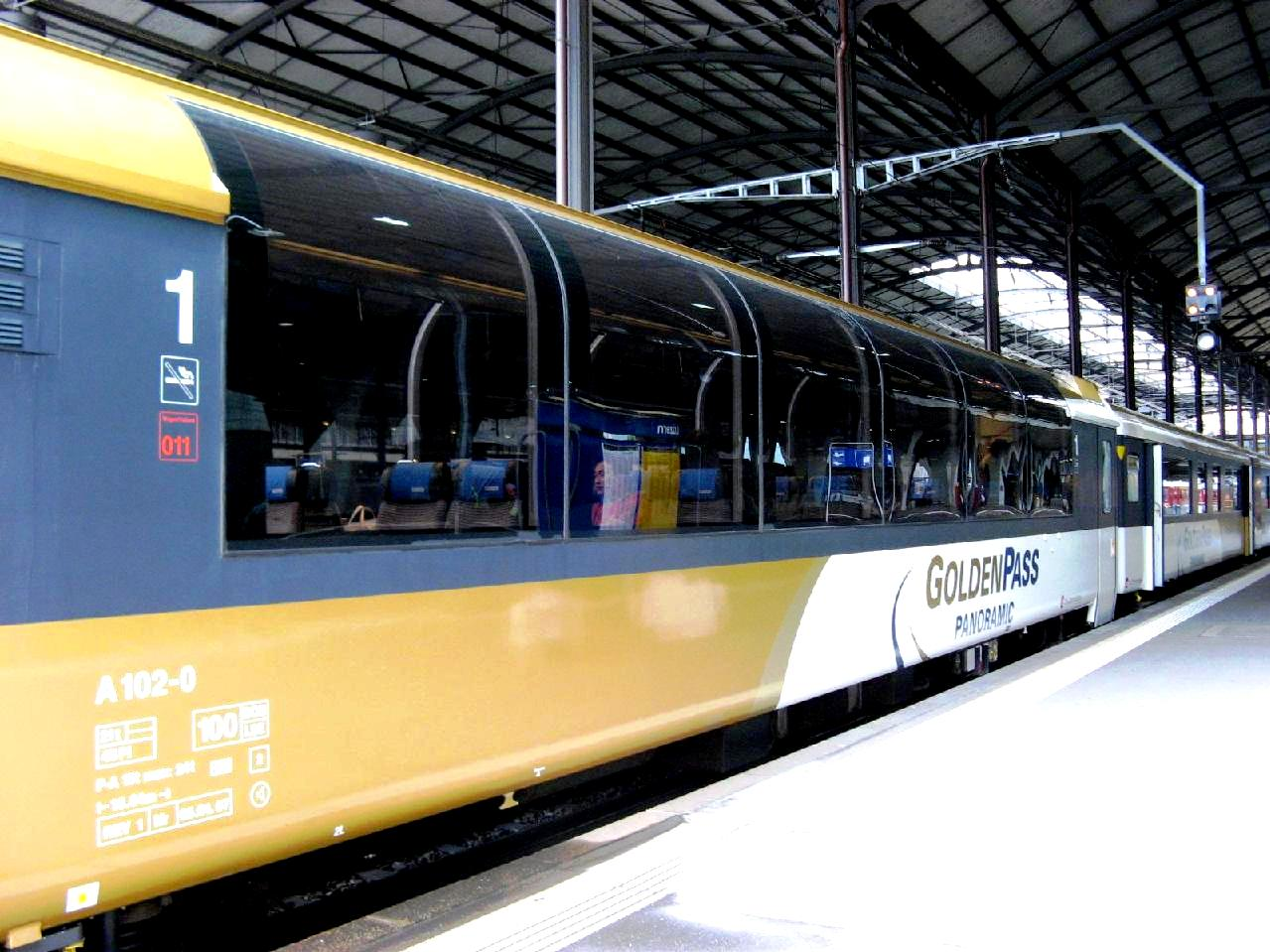
The Golden Pass in Lucerne main station

The GoldenPass Line is a tourist-oriented train route in the Swiss Alps with its base in Montreux. It is not a legal entity but operates and manages the following companies:

- Montreux Oberland Bernois Railway (MOB)
- Transports Montreux-Vevey Riviera (MVR)
- BLS AG
- Zentralbahn(zb)
- Garage Parc Montreux Gare SA (GPMG), which operates the underground car park at Montreux railway station

== MOB ==
MOB operates the Montreux–Lenk im Simmental line:

- Montreux – Zweisimmen
- Zweisimmen – Lenk

== MVR ==
MVR operates the following lines:

- Montreux–Glion–Rochers-de-Naye railway line (train):
  - Montreux – Glion – Les Rochers-de-Naye
- Vevey–Les Pléiades railway line (train):
  - Vevey – Blonay – Les Pléiades
- Vevey–Chardonne–Mont Pèlerin funicular railway (funicular railway):
  - Vevey – Chardonne – Mt-Pèlerin
- Territet–Glion funicular railway (funicular railway):
  - Territet – Glion
- Les Avants–Sonloup funicular (funicular railway):
  - Les Avants – Sonloup

== See also ==
- Rail transport in Switzerland
- GoldenPass Express
- Glacier Express
- Gotthard Panorama Express
