= Château-d'Hauteville railway station =

Railway station in Blonay – Saint-Légier, Switzerland

Château-d'Hauteville

General information
- Location: Blonay – Saint-Légier, Vaud; Switzerland
- Coordinates: 46°28′05″N 6°51′54″E
- Elevation: 515 m (1,690 ft)
- Owner: Transports Montreux–Vevey–Riviera
- Line: Vevey–Les Pléiades line
- Distance: 3.02 km (1.88 mi) from Vevey
- Platforms: 1 (2 side platforms)
- Tracks: 1
- Train operators: Transports Montreux–Vevey–Riviera

Construction
- Accessible: Yes

Other information
- Station code: 8501263 (CHTV)
- Fare zone: 72 (mobilis)

History
- Opened: 1 October 1902

Passengers
- 2023: 280 per weekday (MVR)

Services
Preceding station	Transports Montreux–Vevey–Riviera	Following station
Hauteville towards Vevey	R35	St-Légier-Gare towards Blonay or Les Pléiades
Location

Château-d'Hauteville railway station (French: Gare de Château-d'Hauteville), is a railway station in the municipality of Blonay – Saint-Légier, in the Swiss canton of Vaud. It is an intermediate stop and a request stop on the 1,000 mm (3 ft 3 3/8 in) metre gauge Vevey–Les Pléiades line of Transports Montreux–Vevey–Riviera.

== Services ==
As of the December 2023 timetable change, the following services stop at Château-d'Hauteville:

- Regio: service every 15 minutes or half-hourly service between Vevey and Blonay and hourly service from Blonay to Les Pléiades.

== Bibliography ==
- Wägli, Hans G.; Jacobi, Sébastien (2010). Schienennetz Schweiz - Bahnprofil Schweiz CH+ [Swiss rail network] (in German) (3rd ed.). Zürich: AS Verlag. ISBN 978-3-909111-74-9.
