= Bois-de-Chexbres railway station =

Railway station in Blonay – Saint-Légier, Switzerland

Bois-de-Chexbres

General information
- Location: Blonay – Saint-Légier, Vaud; Switzerland
- Coordinates: 46°28′23″N 6°54′07″E
- Elevation: 800 m (2,600 ft)
- Owner: Transports Montreux–Vevey–Riviera
- Line: Vevey–Les Pléiades line
- Distance: 2.0 km (1.2 mi) from Blonay
- Platforms: 1 side platform
- Tracks: 1
- Train operators: Transports Montreux–Vevey–Riviera

Construction
- Accessible: No

Other information
- Station code: 8530261 (BCHX)
- Fare zone: 66 (mobilis)

History
- Opened: 8 July 1911

Passengers
- 2023: Fewer than 50 persons per day (MVR)

Services
Preceding station	Transports Montreux–Vevey–Riviera	Following station
Les Chevalleyres towards Vevey	R35	Fayaux towards Les Pléiades
Location

Bois-de-Chexbres railway station (French: Gare des Bois-de-Chexbres), is a railway station in the municipality of Blonay – Saint-Légier, in the Swiss canton of Vaud. It is an intermediate stop and a request stop on the 1,000 mm (3 ft 3 3/8 in) metre gauge Vevey–Les Pléiades line of Transports Montreux–Vevey–Riviera.

== Services ==
As of the December 2024 timetable change, the following services stop at Bois-de-Chexbres:

- Regio: hourly service between Vevey and Les Pléiades.

== Bibliography ==
- Wägli, Hans G.; Jacobi, Sébastien (2010). Schienennetz Schweiz - Bahnprofil Schweiz CH+ [Swiss rail network] (in German) (3rd ed.). Zürich: AS Verlag. ISBN 978-3-909111-74-9.
