= St-Légier-Village railway station =

Railway station in Blonay – Saint-Légier, Switzerland

St-Légier-Village

General information
- Location: Blonay – Saint-Légier, Vaud; Switzerland
- Coordinates: 46°28′16″N 6°52′37″E
- Elevation: 553 m (1,814 ft)
- Owner: Transports Montreux–Vevey–Riviera
- Line: Vevey–Les Pléiades line
- Distance: 4.02 km (2.50 mi) from Vevey
- Platforms: 1 side platform
- Tracks: 1
- Train operators: Transports Montreux–Vevey–Riviera
- Connections: VMCV bus line

Construction
- Accessible: Yes

Other information
- Station code: 8501264 (STLV)
- Fare zone: 72 (mobilis)

History
- Opened: 1 October 1902

Passengers
- 2023: 380 per weekday (MVR)

Services
Preceding station	Transports Montreux–Vevey–Riviera	Following station
St-Légier-Gare towards Vevey	R35	La Chiésaz towards Blonay or Les Pléiades
Location

St-Légier-Village railway station (French: Gare de St-Légier-Village), is a railway station in the municipality of Blonay – Saint-Légier, in the Swiss canton of Vaud. It is an intermediate stop and a request stop on the 1,000 mm (3 ft 3 3/8 in) metre gauge Vevey–Les Pléiades line of Transports Montreux–Vevey–Riviera.

== Services ==
As of the December 2023 timetable change, the following services stop at St-Légier-Village:

- Regio: service every 15 minutes or half-hourly service between Vevey and Blonay and hourly service from Blonay to Les Pléiades.

== Bibliography ==
- Wägli, Hans G.; Jacobi, Sébastien (2010). Schienennetz Schweiz - Bahnprofil Schweiz CH+ [Swiss rail network] (in German) (3rd ed.). Zürich: AS Verlag. ISBN 978-3-909111-74-9.
