= Château-de-Blonay railway station =

Railway station in Vaud, Switzerland

Château-de-Blonay

General information
- Location: Blonay – Saint-Légier, Vaud; Switzerland
- Coordinates: 46°28′05″N 6°53′31″E
- Elevation: 605 m (1,985 ft)
- Owner: Transports Montreux–Vevey–Riviera
- Line: Vevey–Les Pléiades line
- Distance: 5.4 km (3.4 mi) from Vevey
- Platforms: 1 side platform
- Tracks: 1
- Train operators: Transports Montreux–Vevey–Riviera

Construction
- Accessible: Yes

Other information
- Station code: 8501266 (CHBL)
- Fare zone: 74 (mobilis)

History
- Opened: 1 October 1902

Passengers
- 2023: 380 per weekday (MVR)

Services
Preceding station	Transports Montreux–Vevey–Riviera	Following station
La Chiésaz towards Vevey	R35	Blonay towards Blonay or Les Pléiades
Location

Château-de-Blonay railway station (French: Gare de Château-de-Blonay), is a railway station in the municipality of Blonay – Saint-Légier, in the Swiss canton of Vaud. It is an intermediate stop and a request stop on the 1,000 mm (3 ft 3 3/8 in) metre gauge Vevey–Les Pléiades line of Transports Montreux–Vevey–Riviera.

== Services ==
As of the December 2023 timetable change, the following services stop at Château-de-Blonay:

- Regio: service every 15 minutes or half-hourly service between Vevey and Blonay and hourly service from Blonay to Les Pléiades.

== Bibliography ==
- Wägli, Hans G.; Jacobi, Sébastien (2010). Schienennetz Schweiz - Bahnprofil Schweiz CH+ [Swiss rail network] (in German) (3rd ed.). Zürich: AS Verlag. ISBN 978-3-909111-74-9.
