= Vevey Vignerons railway station =

Railway station in Vevey, Switzerland

Vevey Vignerons

General information
- Location: Vevey, Vaud; Switzerland
- Coordinates: 46°28′N 6°51′E
- Elevation: 446 m (1,463 ft)
- Owner: Transports Montreux–Vevey–Riviera
- Line: Vevey–Les Pléiades line
- Distance: 1.5 km (0.93 mi) from Vevey
- Platforms: 1 side platform
- Tracks: 1
- Train operators: Transports Montreux–Vevey–Riviera

Construction
- Accessible: Yes

Other information
- Station code: 8502476 (VVVI)
- Fare zone: 70 (mobilis)

History
- Opened: 11 December 2022

Passengers
- 2023: 150 per weekday (MVR)

Services
| Preceding station | Transports Montreux–Vevey–Riviera | Following station |
|---|---|---|
| Vevey Terminus | R35 | Hauteville towards Blonay or Les Pléiades |
Location

Vevey Vignerons railway station (French: Gare de Vevey Vignerons), is a railway station in the municipality of Vevey, in the Swiss canton of Vaud. It is an intermediate stop and a request stop on the 1,000 mm (3 ft 3 3/8 in) metre gauge Vevey–Les Pléiades line of Transports Montreux–Vevey–Riviera.

== Services ==
As of the December 2023 timetable change, the following services stop at Vevey Vignerons:

- Regio: service every 15 minutes or half-hourly service between Vevey and Blonay and hourly service from Blonay to Les Pléiades.

== Bibliography ==
- Wägli, Hans G.; Jacobi, Sébastien (2010). Schienennetz Schweiz - Bahnprofil Schweiz CH+ [Swiss rail network] (in German) (3rd ed.). Zürich: AS Verlag. ISBN 978-3-909111-74-9.
