= Blonay–Chamby railway line =

Railway line in Switzerland

Blonay–Chamby
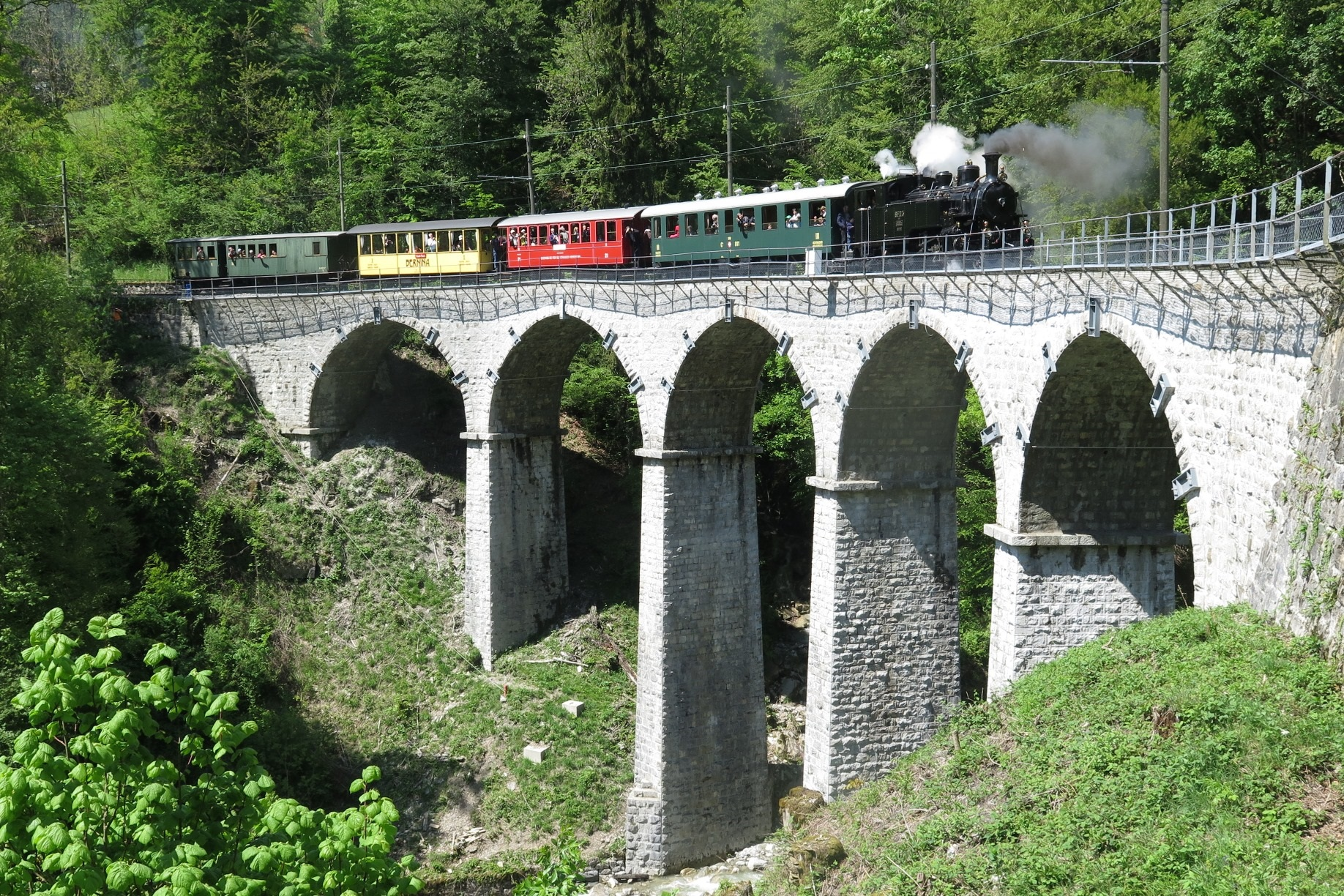
- A steam-powered train of the Blonay–Chamby Museum Railway crosses the Baye de Clarens viaduct in 2016

Overview
- Owner: Transports Montreux–Vevey–Riviera
- Line number: 115
- Termini: Blonay; Chamby

Service
- Operator: Blonay–Chamby Museum Railway

History
- Opened: 1 October 1902

Technical
- Line length: 3.0 km (1.9 mi)
- Number of tracks: 1
- Track gauge: 1,000 mm (3 ft 3 3/8 in) metre gauge
- Electrification: Overhead line, 900 V DC
- Operating speed: 20 km/h (12 mph)

The Blonay–Chamby railway line is a 1,000 mm (3 ft 3 3/8 in) metre gauge railway line in the canton of Vaud, Switzerland. It runs 3.0 kilometres (1.9 mi) from Blonay to Chamby. The line is owned by Transports Montreux–Vevey–Riviera (MVR), who use the line to move rolling stock between the Vevey - les Pleiades line and the Montreux–Lenk im Simmental line. The Blonay–Chamby Museum Railway operates shuttle trains with historic rolling stock over the route at weekends between May and October. It was originally built by the Chemins de fer électriques Veveysans (CEV).

== History ==
The Chemins de fer électriques Veveysans (CEV) opened the line from Vevey to Chamby on 1 October 1902. The line was electrified from opening. The full line runs 8.7 kilometres (5.4 mi); the distance from Blonay to Chamby is 3.0 kilometres (1.9 mi). with a ruling gradient of 50‰. The CEV ceased operations between Blonay and Chamby on 21 May 1966. The line was not abandoned, and the Blonay–Chamby Museum Railway began operations over the route on 20 July 1968.
