= St-Légier railway station =

St-Légier railway station could refer to two stations in Blonay – Saint-Légier, Switzerland:

- St-Légier-Gare railway station
- St-Légier-Village railway station
