= St-Légier–Châtel-St-Denis railway line =

Closed railway line in Switzerland

St-Légier–Châtel-St-Denis
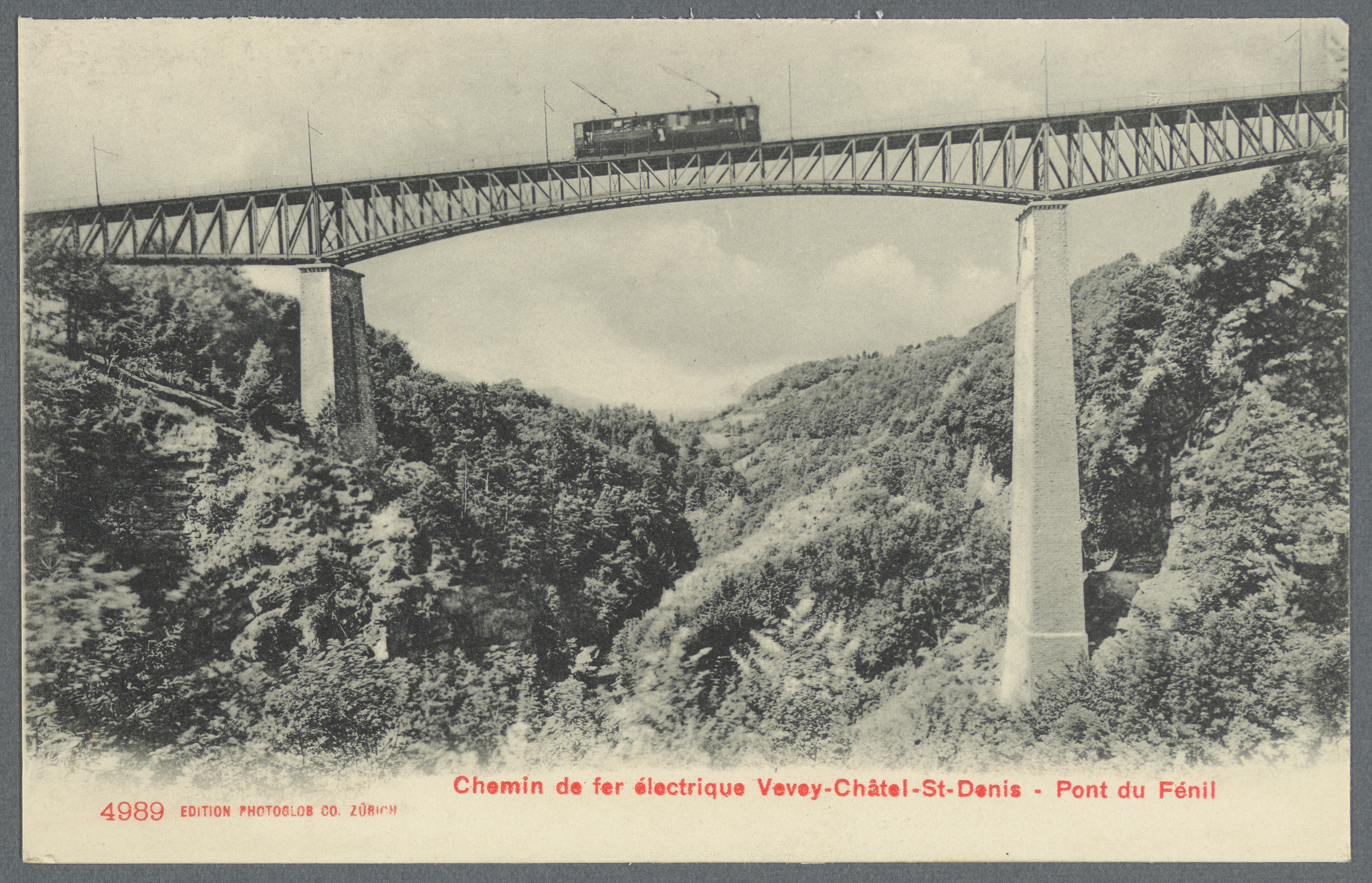
- A CEVA train crosses the bridge over the Veveyse at Fenil circa 1905

Overview
- Status: Closed
- Owner: Chemins de fer électriques Veveysans
- Termini: St-Légier-Gare; Châtel-St-Denis
- Stations: 6

History
- Opened: 2 April 1904
- Closed: 31 May 1969

Technical
- Line length: 7.4 km (4.6 mi)
- Track gauge: 1,000 mm (3 ft 3 3/8 in) metre gauge
- Electrification: 900 V DC overhead contact

The St-Légier–Châtel-St-Denis railway line was a 1,000 mm (3 ft 3 3/8 in) metre gauge railway line in the cantons of Vaud and Fribourg, Switzerland. It ran 7.4 kilometres (4.6 mi) from a junction with the Vevey–Les Pléiades railway line at St-Légier-Gare to a junction with the Palézieux–Bulle–Montbovon railway line at Châtel-St-Denis. The line was owned and operated by the Chemins de fer électriques Veveysans (CEV). It opened in 1904 and was closed in 1969.

== History ==
The Chemins de fer électriques Veveysans (CEV) had opened its original line from Vevey to Chambry in 1902. The line to Châtel-St-Denis branched off this original line at St-Légier-Gare and opened on 2 April 1904. In Châtel-St-Denis the line joined with that of the Chemin de fer Châtel-St-Denis–Palézieux (CP). The CEV closed this branch line on 31 May 1969. In 2019, the lines at Châtel-St-Denis were rebuilt to permit through operation without a turnaround, and a new station was built slightly to the west of the original location.
