= Chemins de fer électriques Veveysans =

Swiss railway company

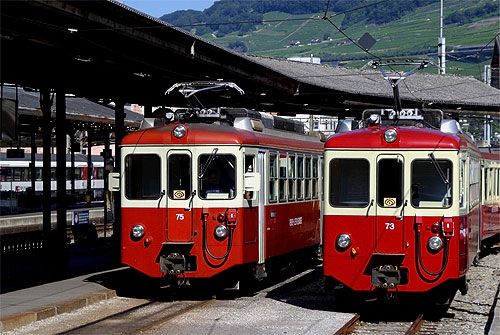
- Former CEV vehicles at Vevey in 2004

Overview
- Locale: Vevey, Switzerland
- Dates of operation: 1902–2001
- Successor: Transports Montreux–Vevey–Riviera

The Chemins de fer électriques Veveysans (CEV) was a railway company that built and operated narrow gauge electric railway lines from Vevey to Blonay, Chamby, Châtel-St-Denis and Les Pléiades, in Switzerland. It began operations in 1902. The CEV and three other companies merged to become the Transports Montreux–Vevey–Riviera in 2001. The Vevey–Les Pléiades railway line remains in active use.

== History ==
The first section to see service, that from Vevey to Chamby, was opened on 1 October 1902. Next section was the branch line from St-Légier to Châtel–St-Denis that opened on 2 April 1904. On 8 July 1911 the rack line from Blonay to Les Pléiades was opened.

On 23 November 1911, Blonay was also reached by the Clarens - Chailly - Blonay electric tramway operated by a separate company (CCB). This closed at the end of 1955, being replaced by buses.

The lines were constructed to a gauge of 1,000 mm (3 ft 3 3/8 in) and electrified from the outset. Presently it operates on 900 V DC, overhead contact. Train services were offered from Vevey to Chamby and Châtel-St-Denis, where the CEV connected to the Montreux–Lenk im Simmental line and the GFM (now tpf). The electric motor coach from Vevey to Chamby conveyed coaches to Blonay, where they were taken over by a rack locomotive and brought up to Les Pléiades.

On 22 May 1966, the section Blonay–Chamby was closed, followed by St-Légier–Châtel-St-Denis on 31 May 1969. While the Châtel-St-Denis branch was torn up, track to Chamby remained. Railway enthusiasts formed an association which could set up a weekend museum operation starting on 20 July 1968. On 24 May 1998 CEV reintroduced regular trains but stopped these services again two years later because of low patronage. The infrastructure was always owned by CEV and the museum trains of the Blonay-Chamby museum railway operate in open access.

Of the remaining open sections, the Vevey to Blonay line is 5.72 km (3.55 mi) long and from there to Les Pléiades a further 4.79 km (2.98 mi). In that 10.51 km (6.53 mi), the line rises some 962 m (3,156 ft) reaching 1,348 m (4,423 ft) at Les Pléiades.

The line has its own workshops at Vevey although much work is undertaken at the MOB's Chernex works and also a small depot at Blonay.

In 2001, CEV was merged into the Transports Montreux-Vevey-Riviera (MVR) which is managed and operated by the MOB management under their Golden Pass Services banner.

== Rolling stock ==
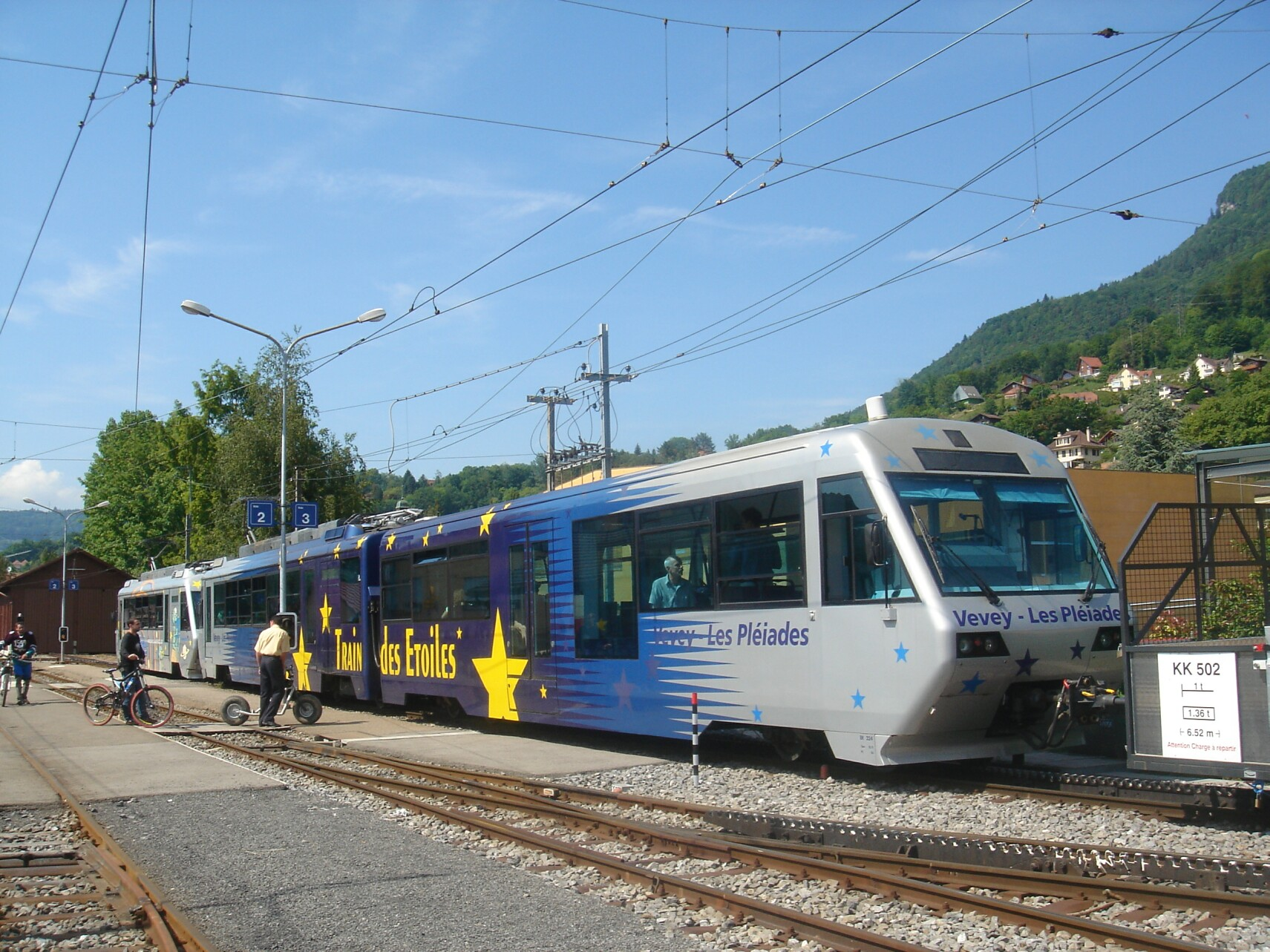
MVR Beh 2/4 71 and Bt 224 arriving from Les Pléiades in MU behind 72, Sunday, 20 May 2007

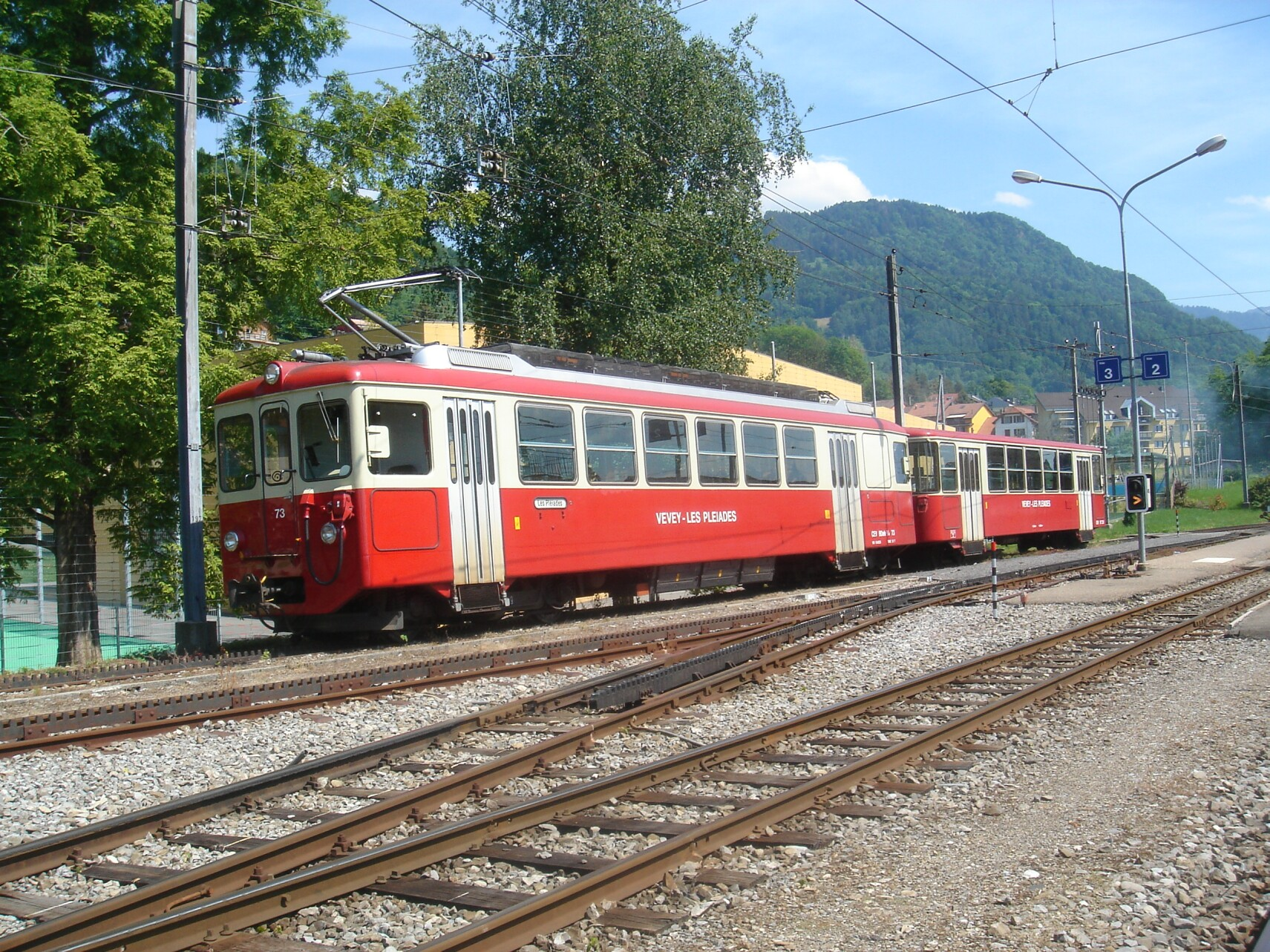
MVR BDeh 2/4 73 and Bt 221 on 20 May 2007 in Blonay. 71-75 originally were identical.

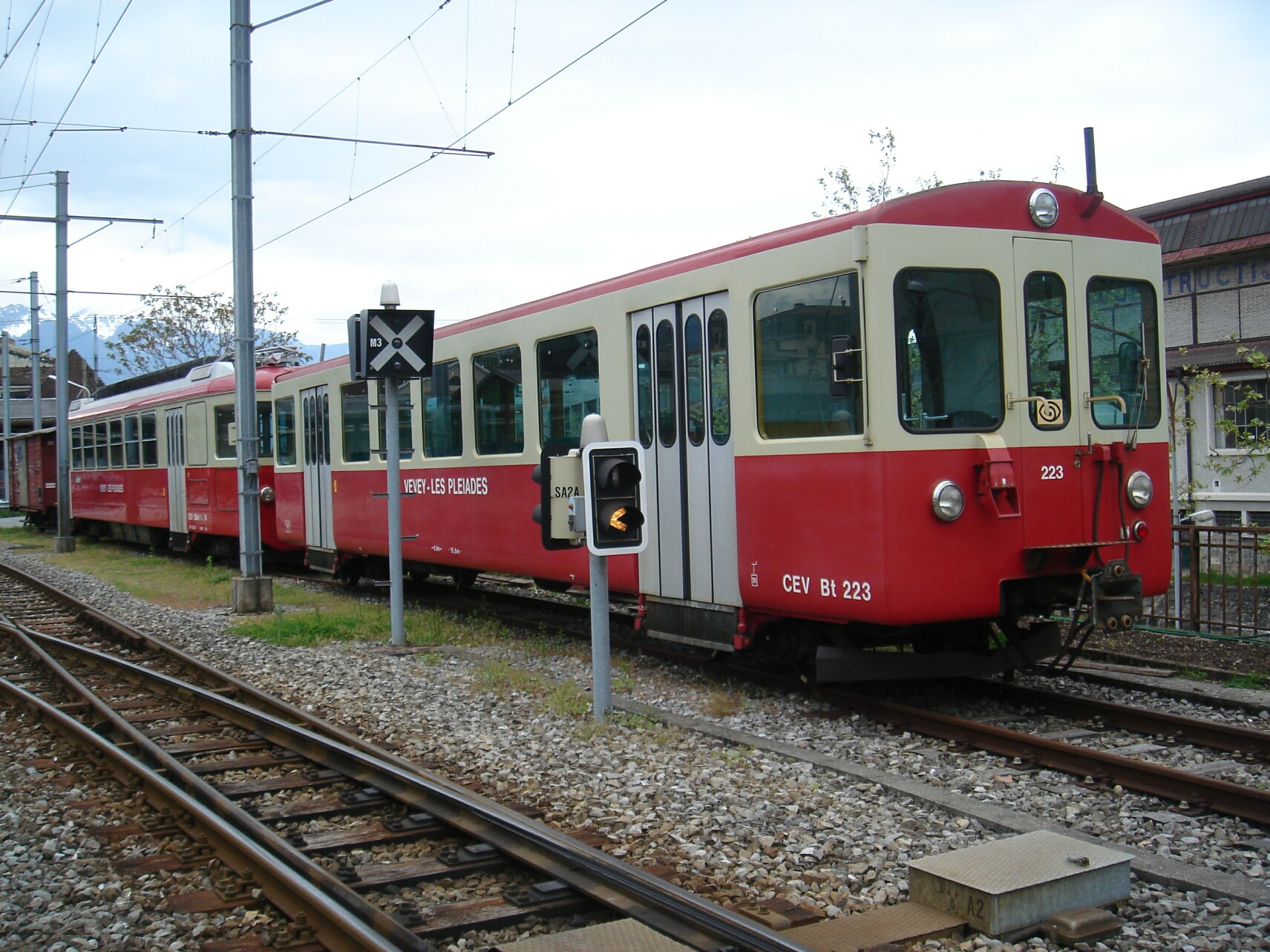
MVR Bt 223 and BDeh 2/4 74 in Vevey on 6 May 2005

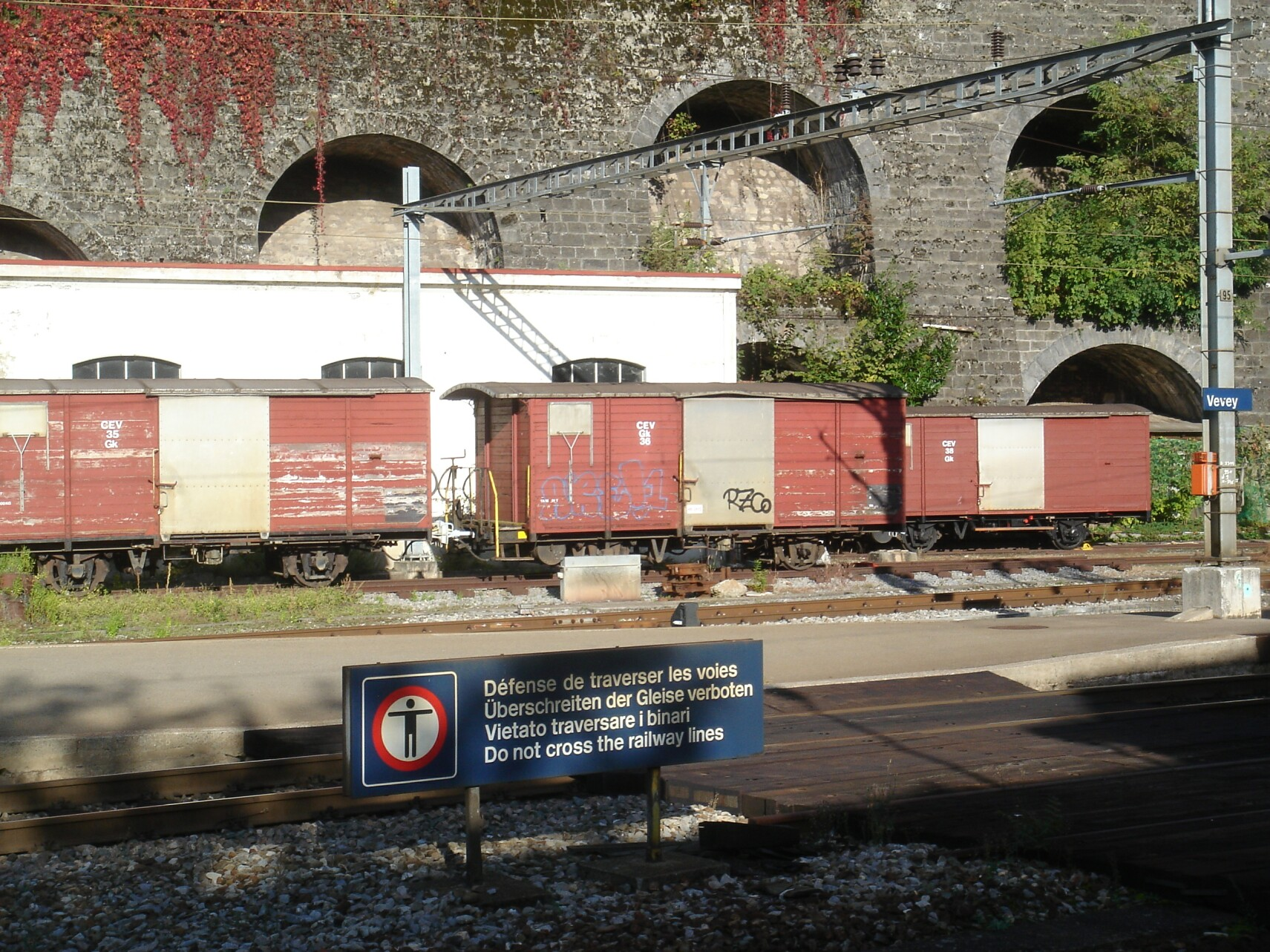
MVR Gk 35, 36 and 38 in Vevey on 8 October 2006

No.	Name	Class	Builders details	Date Built	Notes.
1		HGe2/2	SLM/MFO/SIG	1911	Rebuilt 2007, red livery, lettered 'Blonay-Les Pléiades' (Note 5)
2		HGe2/2	SLM/MFO/SIG	1911	Red & White livery, lettered 'Blonay-Les Pléiades'
3		HGe2/2	SLM/MFO/SIG	1913	Withdrawn 1984.
71		BDeh2/4	SWP/SAAS	1970	Rack & Adhesion. Rebuilt (see below)
71		Beh2/4	Rebuilt from above	1999	Train des Etoiles (Silver with stars) livery, single cab, permanently coupled to Bt 224
72		BDeh2/4	SWP/SAAS/BBC	1970	Rack & Adhesion. Rebuilt (see below)
72		Beh2/4	Rebuilt from above	2002	Astro Pléiades livery, double ended (2 cabs)
73		BDeh2/4	SWP/SAAS/BBC	1970	Rack & Adhesion, red & white livery (Note 3)
74		BDeh2/4	SWP/SAAS/BBC	1970	Rack & Adhesion, red & white livery
75		BDeh2/4	SWP/SAAS/BBC	1983	Rack & Adhesion, red & white livery
81		Te2/2	SWS/MFO/CEV	1963	Built in 1963 using parts from retired Luzern trams. Often found at Chernex working as "works shunter".
82		Te2/2	SWS/MFO/CEV	1938	Built on frame of wagon K 39 and used spare motors from 101 series
91		Xrot	SWS/CEV/Boschung	1910/66	ex-L 401 Snowplough(Note 2)
101	Blonay	BCFe4/4	SWS/MFO/CEV	1903	Rebuilt 1949. Scrapped 1983
102		BCFe4/4	SWS/MFO/CEV	1903	Scrapped 1975
103		BCFe4/4	SWS/MFO/CEV	1903	Rebuilt 1951. Scrapped 2010
104	Vevey	BCFe4/4	SWS/MFO/CEV	1905	Rebuilt 1945. Scrapped 1973
105		BCFe4/4; BDe4/4	SWS/MFO	1913	Rebuilt 1964, not in running order, being restored as historic vehicle
221		Bt	SWP/SAAS	1976	Driving Trailer
222		Bt	SWP/SAAS	1976	Driving Trailer.
223		Bt	ACMV/BBC/SIG	1981	Driving Trailer-used parts including bogies from coach 211 built by SIG,1949, 2009 sold to TPC
224		Bt	ACMV/BBC/SIG	1990	Driving Trailer - used parts including bogies from coach 212 built by SIG,1949. Burnt out 1996(see below)
224		Bt	R+J/MOB/ABB	1999	Driving Trailer, bogies SIG, 1949, frame rebodied and rebuilt with low floor, 1999, used as trailer car with rebuilt No. 71
7001	Vevey	Be2/6	Stadler/ACMV/Adtranz/SLM	1997	Nameplates removed and passed to 75 . Sold. Note 1
7002	St Legier La Chiesaz	Be2/6	Stadler/ACMV/Adtranz/SLM	1997	Nameplates removed and passed to 75 . Sold,. Note 1
7003	Blonay	Be2/6	Stadler/ACMV/Adtranz/SLM	1998	Nameplates removed and passed to 7502. Sold. Note 1 / Note 6
7004	Montreux	Be2/6	Stadler/ACMV/Adtranz/SLM	1998	Nameplates removed and passed to 75 . Sold. Note 1
7501	St Legier-La Chiesaz	ABeh2/6	Stadler/Stadler ABB	1.12.2015	Acceptance at Chernex. Note 7
7502	Blonay	ABeh2/6	Stadler/Stadler ABB	1.4.2016	Acceptance at Chernex. Note 7
7503		ABeh2/6	Stadler/Stadler ABB	1.4.2016	Acceptance at Chernex. Note 7
7504	Vevey	ABeh2/6	Stadler/Stadler ABB	1.4.2016	Acceptance at Chernex. Note 7
7505		ABeh2/6	Stadler/Stadler ABB	1.12.2016	Acceptance at Chernex. Note 7
7506		ABeh2/6	Stadler/Stadler ABB	1.10.2016	Acceptance at Chernex. Note 7
7507		ABeh2/6	Stadler/Stadler ABB		Acceptance at Chernex. Note 7
7508		ABeh2/6	Stadler/Stadler ABB	1.2.2017	Acceptance at Chernex. Note 7

- Note 1: This class are labeled Chemin de fer Léger de la Riviera, Two of them are usually to be found working on the Vevey - Blonay line whilst the other two are found working from Montreux. The numbering scheme used is that of the Montreux–Lenk im Simmental line.
- Note 2: Rotary plough blowers by Boschung Schmitten on downhill end, double plough blades in 'V' formation at uphill end, mounted on underframe of L 401.
- Note 3: This railcar was the first to be released from works with the new "golden pass" logo. The lower panel, below the main saloon, was repainted in red and the cream coloured logo applied.(First week in May 2010).
- Note 4: Motor coaches 101–105 delivered as BCFe 4/4 (2nd and 3rd class plus luggage, adhesion only), became ABFe 4/4 in 1956, ABDe 4/4 in 1963 and BDe 4/4 in 1970, when first class was abolished on CEV.
- Note 5: Locomotives 1–3 were delivered as HGe 2/2 for rack & adhesion. 1950/51 they were rebuilt to rack only and became thus He 2/2.
- Note 6: This railcar was the first to appear in Golden Pass white/gold livery in October 2011.
- Note 7: These eight sets, 7501 - 8, are part of the re-equipment of the CEV, 2017 - 2019, to give a more frequent service from July 2019. No.7501 was released to traffic in December 2015 in the midnight blue and white livery similar to that formally used on the Golden Pass Panorama trains. The set is similar to the Stadler "Flirt" trains used elsewhere in Europe but this in metre gauge format.

=== Abbreviations ===
- ABB = ABB Group
- ACMV = Ateliers de constructions mécaniques de Vevey
- BBC = Brown, Boveri & Cie
- CEV = Chemins de fer électriques Veveysans
- MFO = Maschinenfabrik Oerlikon
- MOB = Montreux-Oberland Bernois
- R+J = Ramseier + Jenzer
- SAAS = Société Anonyme des Ateliers de Sécheron, Geneva
- SIG = Schweizerische Industrie Gesellschaft
- SLM = Swiss Locomotive and Machine Works, Winterthur
- SWP = Schindler Waggon Pratteln

== Sources ==
- Michel Grandguillaume, Gérald Hadorn, Jean Paillard, Jean-Louis Rochaix: Crémaillères et funiculaires vaudois. BVA, Lausanne 1982, ISBN 2-88125-002-5
- Michel Grandguillaume, Gérald Hadorn, Sébastien Jarne, Jean-Louis Rochaix: Voies étroites de Veveyse et de Gruyère. BVA, Lausanne 1984, ISBN 2-88125-003-3
- Rochaix et al.: Chemins de fer privés vaudois 1873 - 2000. Editions La Raillère, CH-1092 Belmont 2000, ISBN 2-88125-011-4
- Rochaix et al.: Chemins de fer privés vaudois 2000 - 2009. Editions La Raillère, CH-1092 Belmont 2009, ISBN 978-2-88125-012-5
