= Les Avants–Sonloup funicular =

Funicular railway in the canton of Vaud, Switzerland

Coordinates: 46.4557°N 6.9413°E

Chemin de fer Les Avants–Sonloup
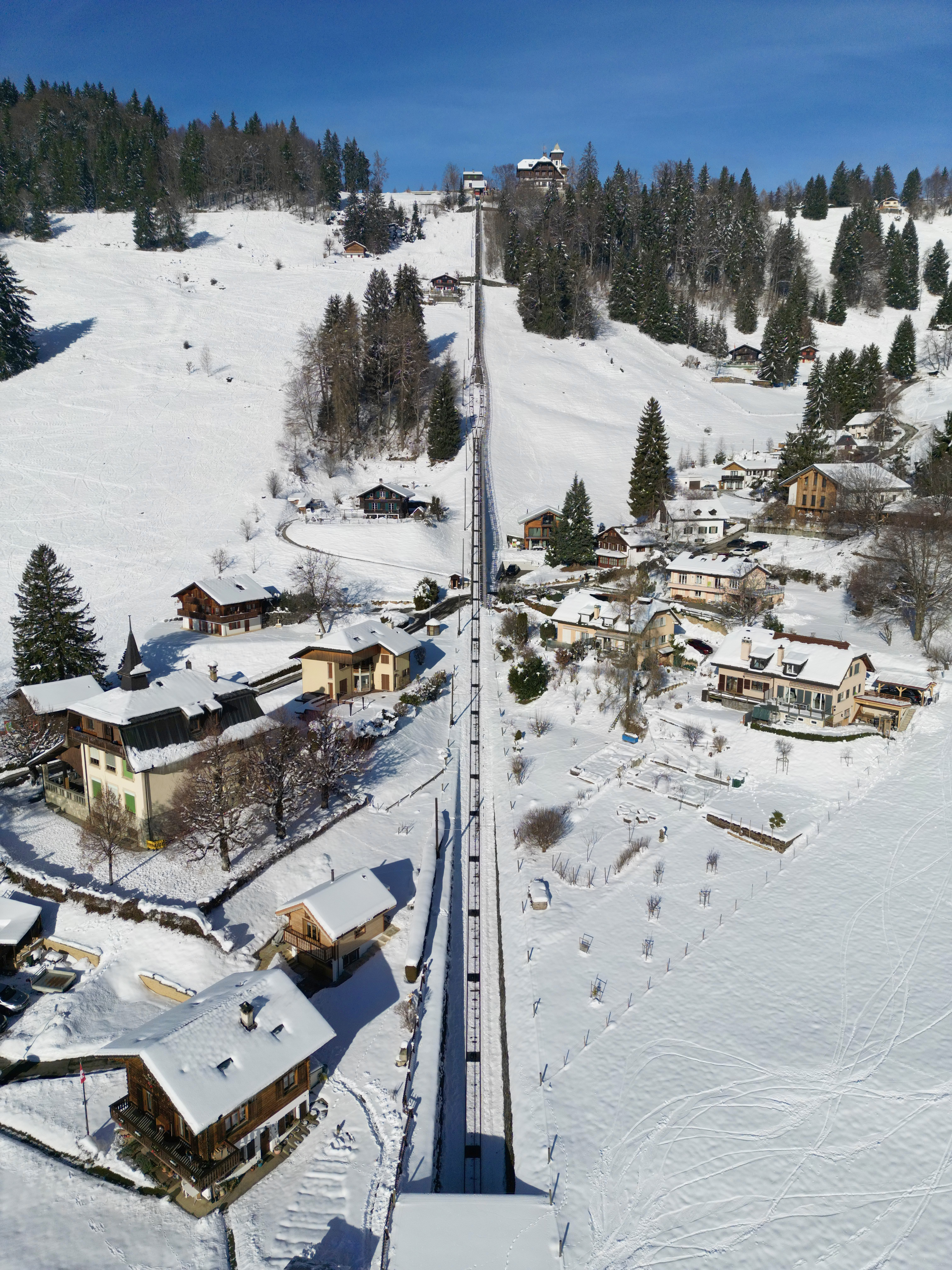

Overview
- Status: in operation
- Owner: Transports Montreux – Vevey Riviera (since 2001); Compagnie du chemin de fer Les Avants-Sonloup
- Locale: Vaud, Switzerland
- Termini: Les Avants; Sonloup
- Connecting lines: Montreux–Zweisimmen
- Stations: 2
- Website: lesavantsfuni.ch

Service
- Type: Funicular
- Operator(s): Transports Montreux – Vevey Riviera (short: MVR)
- Rolling stock: 2 for 40 passengers each

History
- Opened: 14 December 1912 (113 years ago)

Technical
- Line length: 515 m (1,690 ft)
- Number of tracks: 1 with passing loop
- Track gauge: 1,000 mm (3 ft 3 3/8 in)
- Electrification: from opening
- Operating speed: 1.6 metres per second (5.2 ft/s)
- Highest elevation: 184 m (603.7 ft) above Les Avants
- Maximum incline: 54%

The Les Avants–Sonloup funicular (French: Chemin de fer Les Avants–Sonloup) is a metre gauge funicular railway in the Swiss canton of Vaud. It links the railway station of Les Avants, on the Montreux–Lenk im Simmental line between Montreux and Montbovon, with an upper terminus at Sonloup.

== Description ==
The funicular, which was opened on 14 December 1912, runs at a right angle to the MOB line for a distance of 515 m (1,690 ft) and in doing so climbs at a 54% gradient to a height of 184 m (603.7 ft) above Les Avants. The line is still operated with the original Belle Epoque carriages.

The peak season for tourists, is in the spring, when the narcissus and forget-me-not plants flower in the meadowlands near the summit.

== Parameters ==
The funicular has the following parameters:

Feature	Value
Number of stops	2
Configuration	Single track with passing loop
Track length	515 metres (1,690 ft)
Rise	180 metres (590 ft)
Maximum gradient	54%
Track gauge	1,000 mm (3 ft 3 3/8 in) metre gauge
Number of cars	2
Capacity	40 passengers per car
Maximum speed	1.6 metres per second (5.2 ft/s)
Travel time	6 minutes

The line is operated by Transports Montreux – Vevey Riviera, under the GoldenPass Services banner.

== Gallery ==
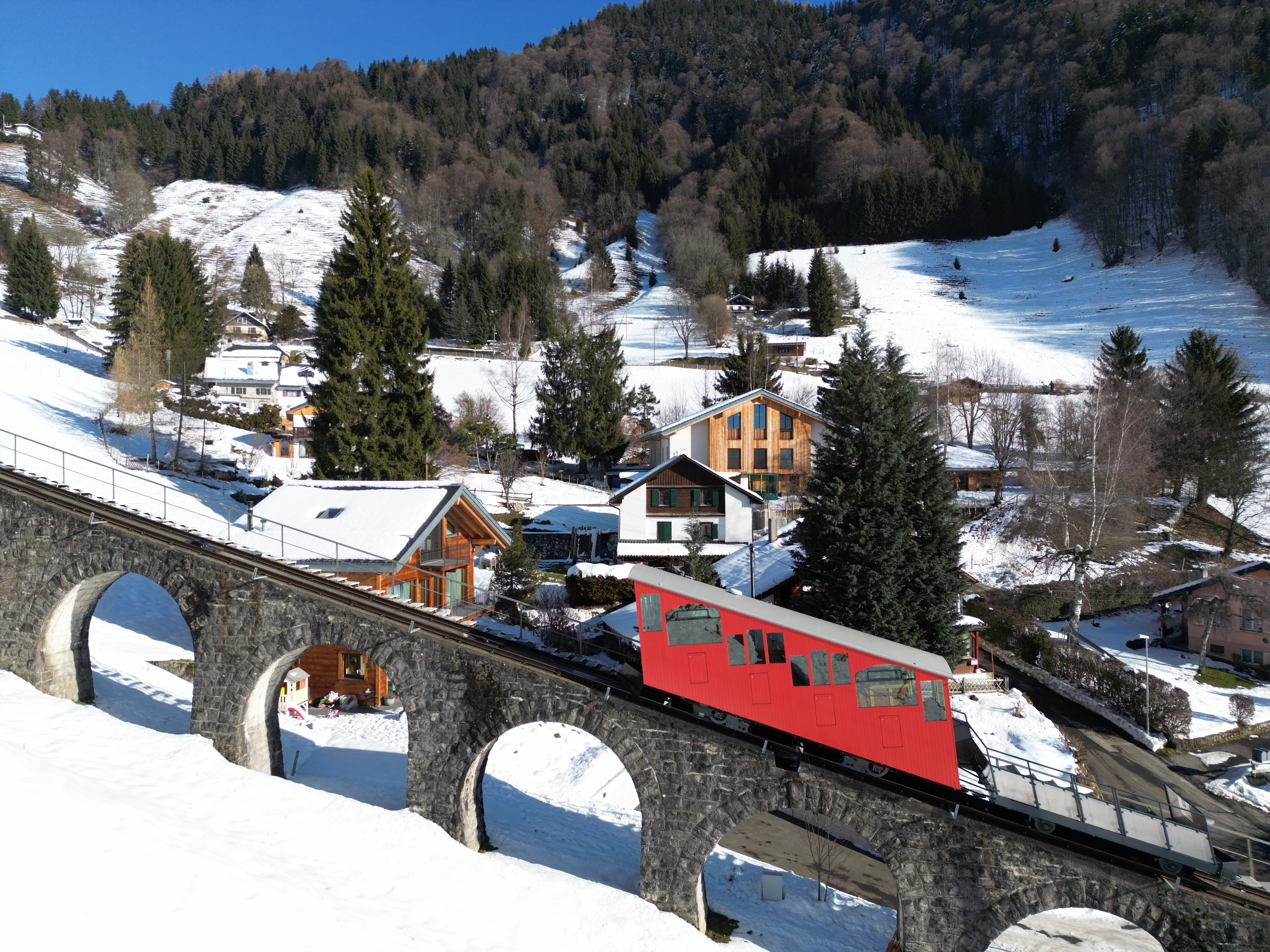
Les Avants-Sonloup funicular cabin

== See also ==
- List of funicular railways
- List of funiculars in Switzerland
- List of heritage railways and funiculars in Switzerland
