= Chamby railway station =

Train station in Switzerland

Chamby
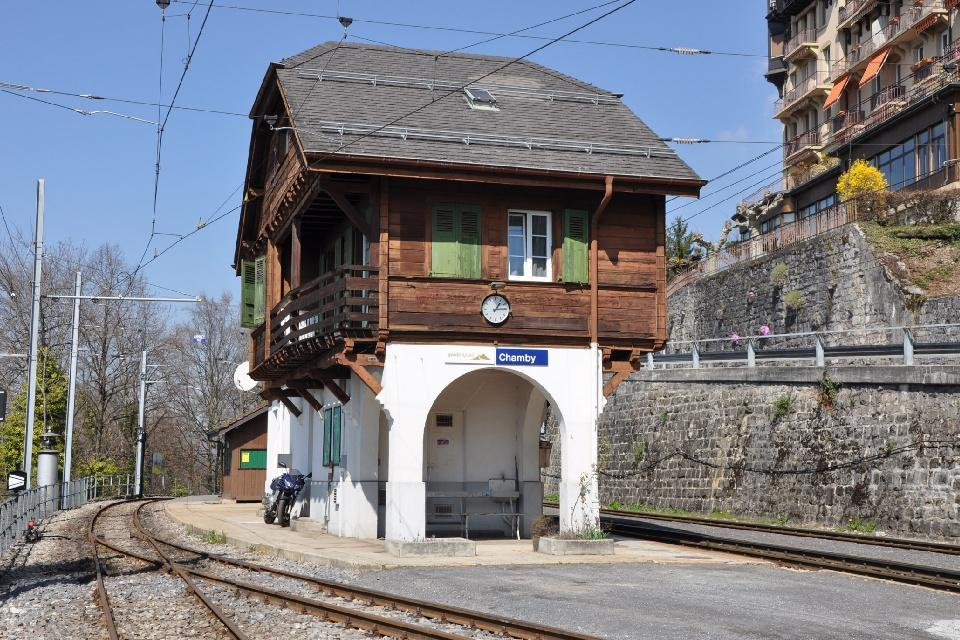
- The station in 2011

General information
- Location: Montreux, Vaud; Switzerland
- Coordinates: 46°26′57″N 6°54′49″E
- Elevation: 748 m (2,454 ft)
- Owner: Montreux Oberland Bernois Railway
- Lines: Montreux–Lenk im Simmental line; Blonay–Chamby railway line
- Distance: 7.2 km (4.5 mi) from Montreux
- Train operators: Montreux Oberland Bernois Railway; Blonay–Chamby Museum Railway
- Connections: VMCV buses

Other information
- Fare zone: 74 (mobilis)

Services
Preceding station	Montreux Oberland Bernois Railway	Following station
Sonzier towards Montreux	PE30	Les Avants towards Zweisimmen
Sonzier towards Montreux	R34	Sendy-Sollard towards Les Avants
Station layout
Location

Chamby railway station (French: Gare de Chamby) is a railway station in the municipality of Montreux, in the Swiss canton of Vaud. It is located at the junction of the 1,000 mm (3 ft 3 3/8 in) metre gauge Montreux–Lenk im Simmental line of the Montreux Oberland Bernois Railway the and Blonay–Chamby railway line of Transports Montreux–Vevey–Riviera. The latter is operated as a heritage railway by the Blonay–Chamby Museum Railway.

== Services ==
As of the December 2021 timetable change, the following services stop at Chamby:

- Panorama Express / Regio: half-hourly service between Montreux and Les Avants and hourly service to Zweisimmen.
- Blonay–Chamby Museum Railway: On Saturdays and Sundays between May and October, hourly service in daylight to Chamby-Musée.
