= Vevey–Chardonne–Mont Pèlerin funicular railway =

Funicular railway in the Canton of Vaud, Switzerland

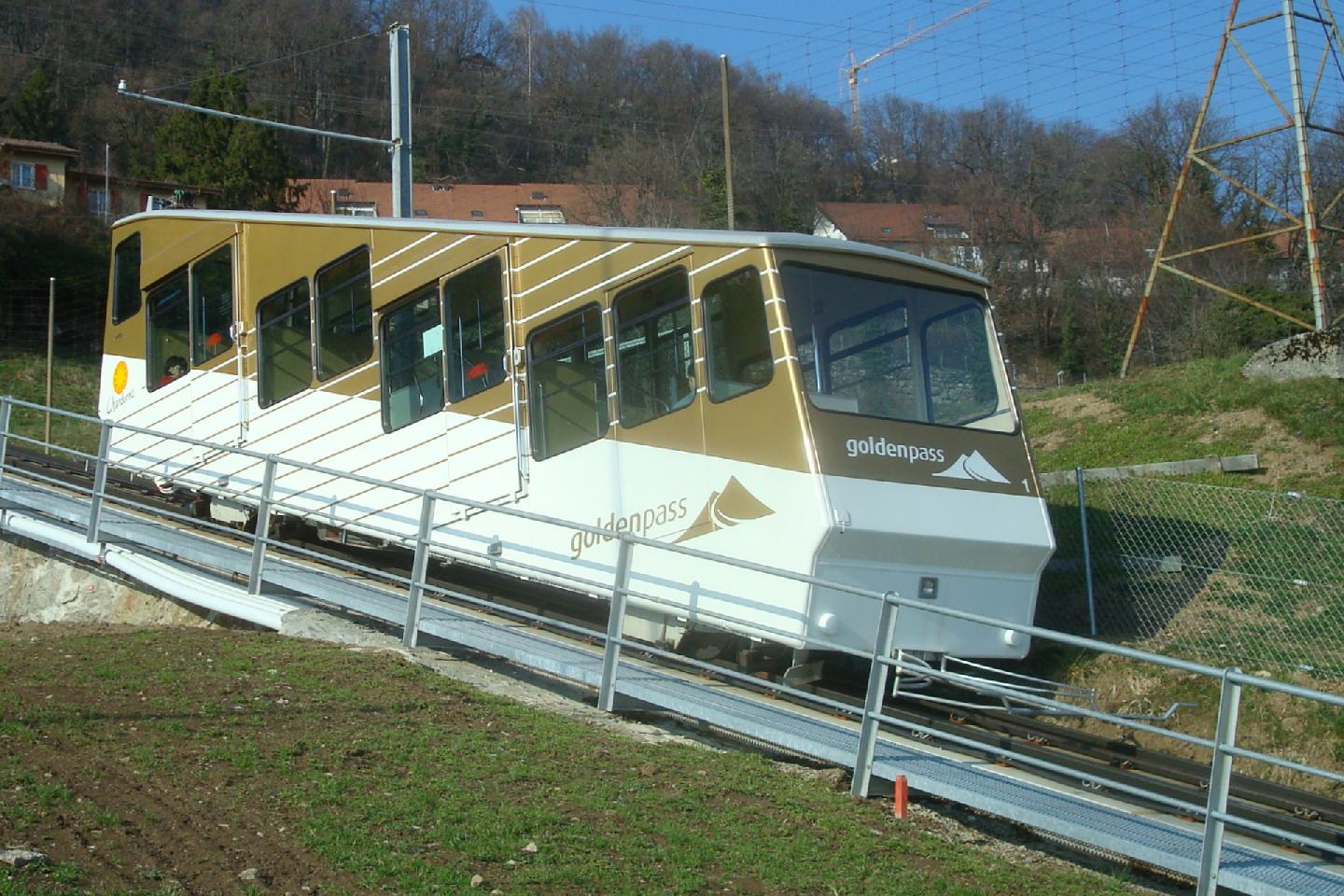

Overview
- Status: in operation
- Owner: Transports Montreux–Vevey–Riviera (since 2001); Compagnie du Chemin de fer funiculaire Vevey-Chardonne-Mont-Pèlerin
- Locale: Vaud, Switzerland
- Coordinates: 46.47540°N 6.83403°E
- Termini: "Vevey (funi)" (46.468531°N 6.83598°E); "Mont-Pèlerin" (46.48182°N 6.83152°E)
- Connecting lines: Vevey–Chexbres
- Stations: 6 (including (La Baume, Chardonne-Jongny, Beau-Site, Corseaux)

Service
- Type: Funicular
- Route number: 2050
- Operator(s): Transports Montreux–Vevey–Riviera (short: MVR)
- Rolling stock: 2

History
- Opened: 24 July 1900 (125 years ago)
- Enhancements: 2014

Technical
- Line length: 1,584 m (5,197 ft)
- Number of tracks: 1 with passing loop
- Track gauge: 1,000 mm (3 ft 3 3/8 in) metre gauge
- Electrification: from opening
- Highest elevation: 807 m (2,648 ft)
- Maximum incline: 54%

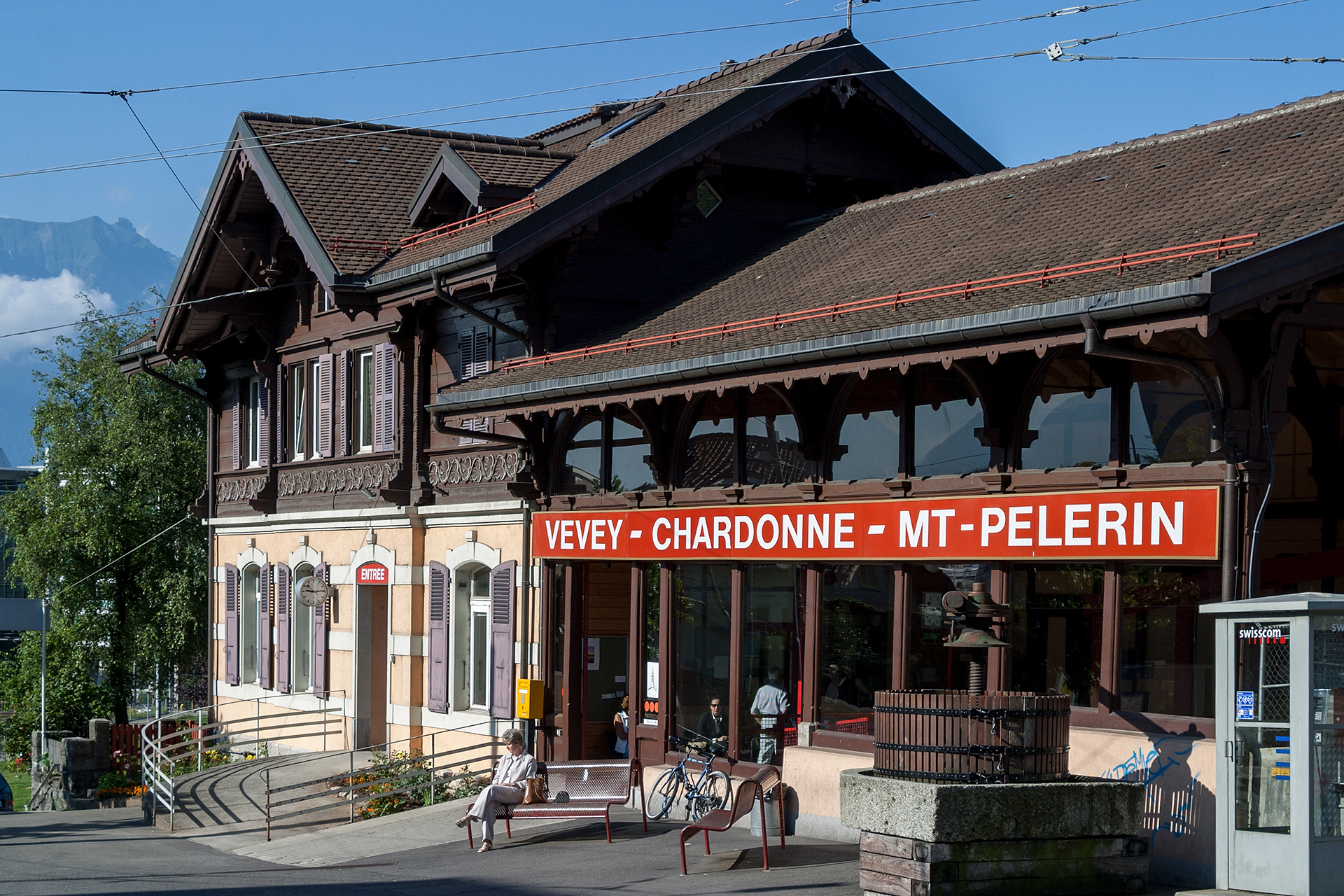
The lower station of the funicular

The Vevey–Chardonne–Mont Pèlerin funicular railway (French: Chemin de fer funiculaire Vevey–Chardonne–Mont Pèlerin; VCP) is a funicular which runs between Vevey, a town on the north shore of Lake Geneva in the canton of Vaud, through the Chardonne vineyards of Lavaux to Mont Pèlerin.

The line was constructed in 1899 and opened the following year. It is a single track of 1,000 mm (3 ft 3 3/8 in) metre gauge) with a passing point but is unusual in that it has three intermediate halts (Corseaux, Chardonne and la Baume). The lower station is located next to Vevey-Funi railway station. The line rises from 393 m (1,289 ft) at Vevey to 807 m (2,648 ft) at its summit, a total of 414 m (1,358 ft) over its 1,584 m (5,197 ft) length, with a maximum gradient of 54% (1 in 1.84). Construction was by the Doppelmayr Von Roll consortium. Nowadays, the line, which is electrically operated, is automatic, with a journey time of 10 minutes.

The operating company became part of the Transports Montreux-Vevey-Riviera (MVR) in 2001 and is now marketed by the MOB (Montreux-Oberland Bernois) company under their GoldenPass services banner.

== Refurbishment ==
In the summer of 2009, the line was closed for major infrastructure work to be carried out and at the same time the two carriages refurbished and rebranded in "Golden Pass" livery. The work, which was completed by 25 September 2009, and which involved the technical services of the Golden Pass group together with private enterprise cost just over CHF 4.8 million. During the work a replacement bus service was provided (as far as possible) to cover for the funicular journeys. The Golden Pass identity for the funicular, it is hoped, will give it more of a national and international naming and it is hoped will bring in more visitors through this branding. The new colours of the carriages will be applied to other funiculars in the Golden Pass Group as well as buses and trains, other than the Golden Pass Panoramic and Golden Pass Classic which they operate.

== Access ==
The lower terminus (Vevey-Funiculaire terminus) of the line is served by the Riviera trolleybus system, specifically line 201 of VMCV.

== See also ==
- List of funicular railways
- List of funiculars in Switzerland
