= Les Pléiades =

Mountain in Switzerland

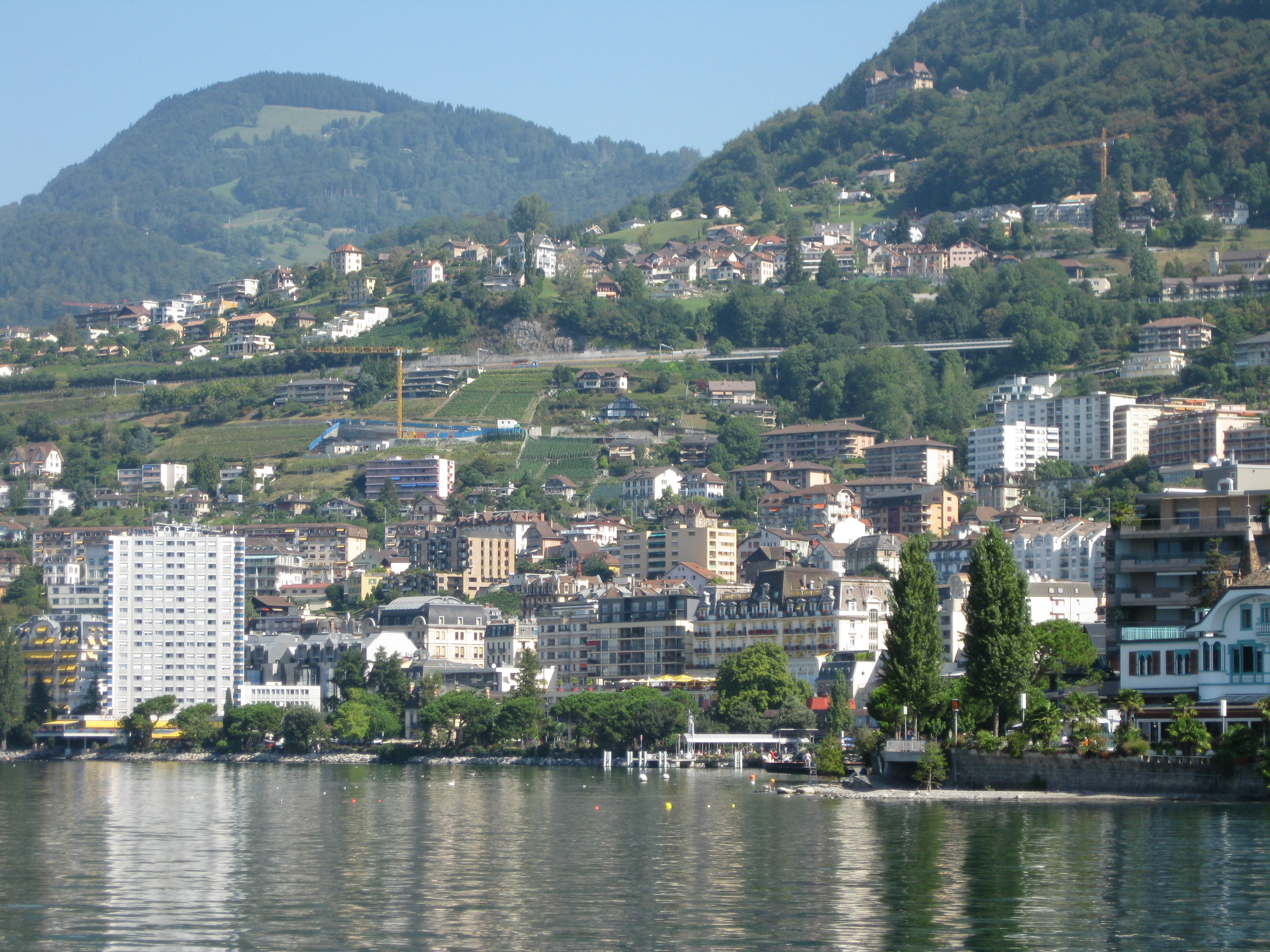
- Les Pléiades (left summit) from Montreux

Highest point
- Elevation: 1,397 m (4,583 ft)
- Prominence: 243 m (797 ft)
- Coordinates: 46°29′23″N 6°54′47″E

Geography
- Location within Switzerland
- Location: Vaud, Switzerland
- Parent range: Swiss Prealps

Les Pléiades (1,397 m) are a mountain of the Swiss Prealps, overlooking Lake Geneva in the Swiss canton of Vaud. They are located north of Blonay.

A railway connects Vevey and Blonay to a secondary summit (1,361 m) of Les Pléiades. The railway is operated by the company Transports Montreux–Vevey–Riviera.

== See also ==
- List of mountains of Switzerland accessible by public transport
