= Blonay railway station =

Railway station in Blonay – Saint-Légier, Switzerland

Blonay
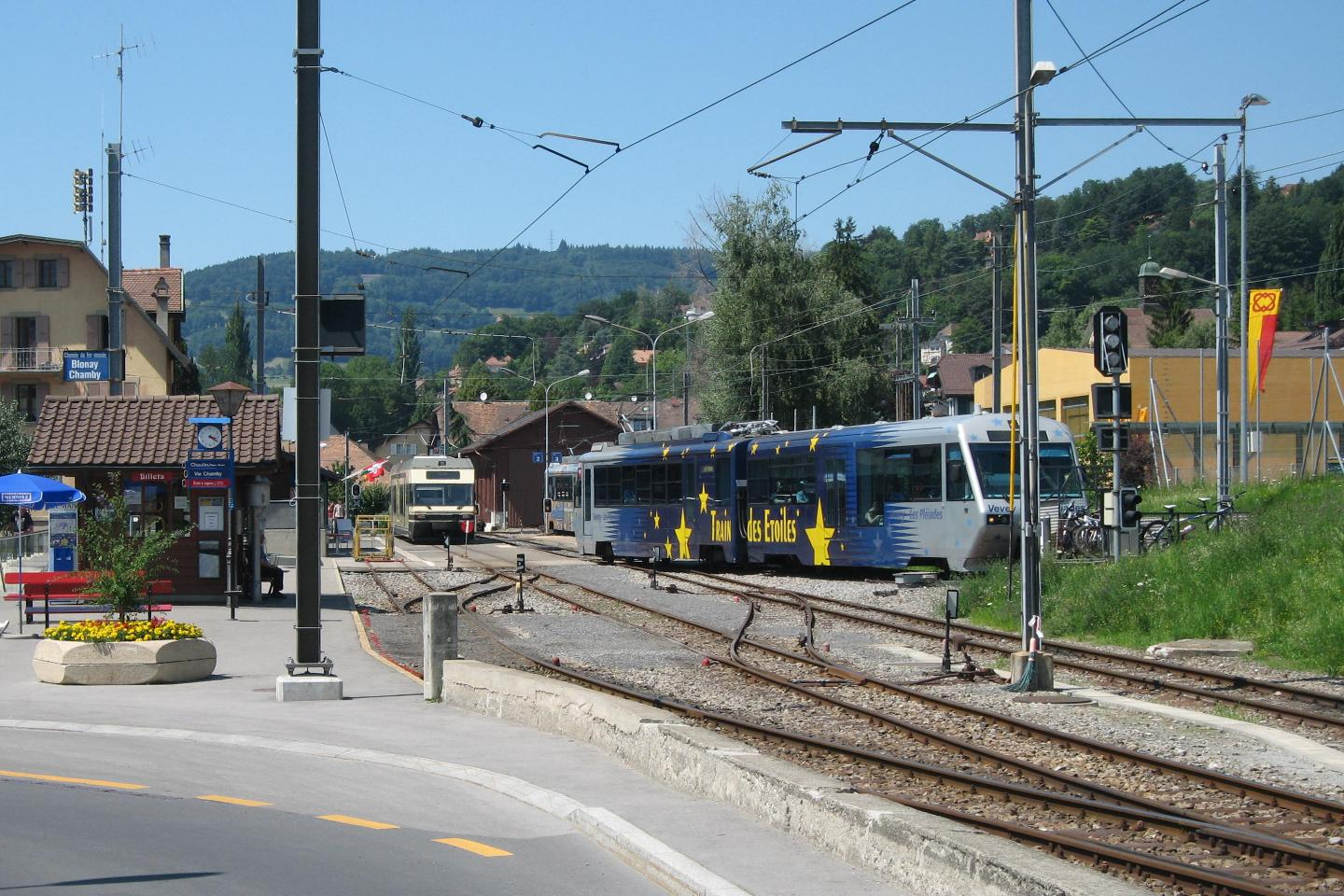
- The station in 2011; the museum building and platform is in the foreground

General information
- Location: Blonay – Saint-Légier, Vaud; Switzerland
- Coordinates: 46°27′58″N 6°53′46″E
- Elevation: 620 m (2,030 ft)
- Owner: Transports Montreux–Vevey–Riviera
- Lines: Vevey–Les Pléiades railway line; Blonay–Chamby railway line
- Distance: 5.7 km (3.5 mi) from Vevey
- Platforms: 3
- Tracks: 3
- Train operators: Transports Montreux–Vevey–Riviera; Blonay–Chamby Museum Railway
- Connections: VMCV buses

Construction
- Parking: Yes
- Accessible: No

Other information
- Station code: 8501281 (BLON)
- Fare zone: 74 (mobilis)

Passengers
- 2023: 1'100 per weekday (MVR)

Services
Preceding station	Transports Montreux–Vevey–Riviera	Following station
Château-de-Blonay towards Vevey	R35	Prélaz-sur-Blonay towards Les Pléiades
Château-de-Blonay towards Vevey	R35	Terminus
Station layout
Location

Blonay railway station (French: Gare de Blonay) is a railway station in the municipality of Blonay, in the Swiss canton of Vaud. It is located at the junction of the 1,000 mm (3 ft 3 3/8 in) metre gauge Vevey–Les Pléiades and Blonay–Chamby railway lines. Both are owned by Transports Montreux–Vevey–Riviera, although the latter is operated as a heritage railway by the Blonay–Chamby Museum Railway.

== Services ==
As of the December 2023 timetable change, the following services stop at Blonay:

- Regio: service every fifteen minutes or half-hourly service to Vevey and hourly service to Les Pléiades.
- Blonay–Chamby Museum Railway: On Saturdays and Sundays between May and October, hourly service in daylight to Chamby-Musée via Chamby.
