= Les Pléiades railway station =

Railway station in Blonay – Saint-Légier, Switzerland

Les Pléiades
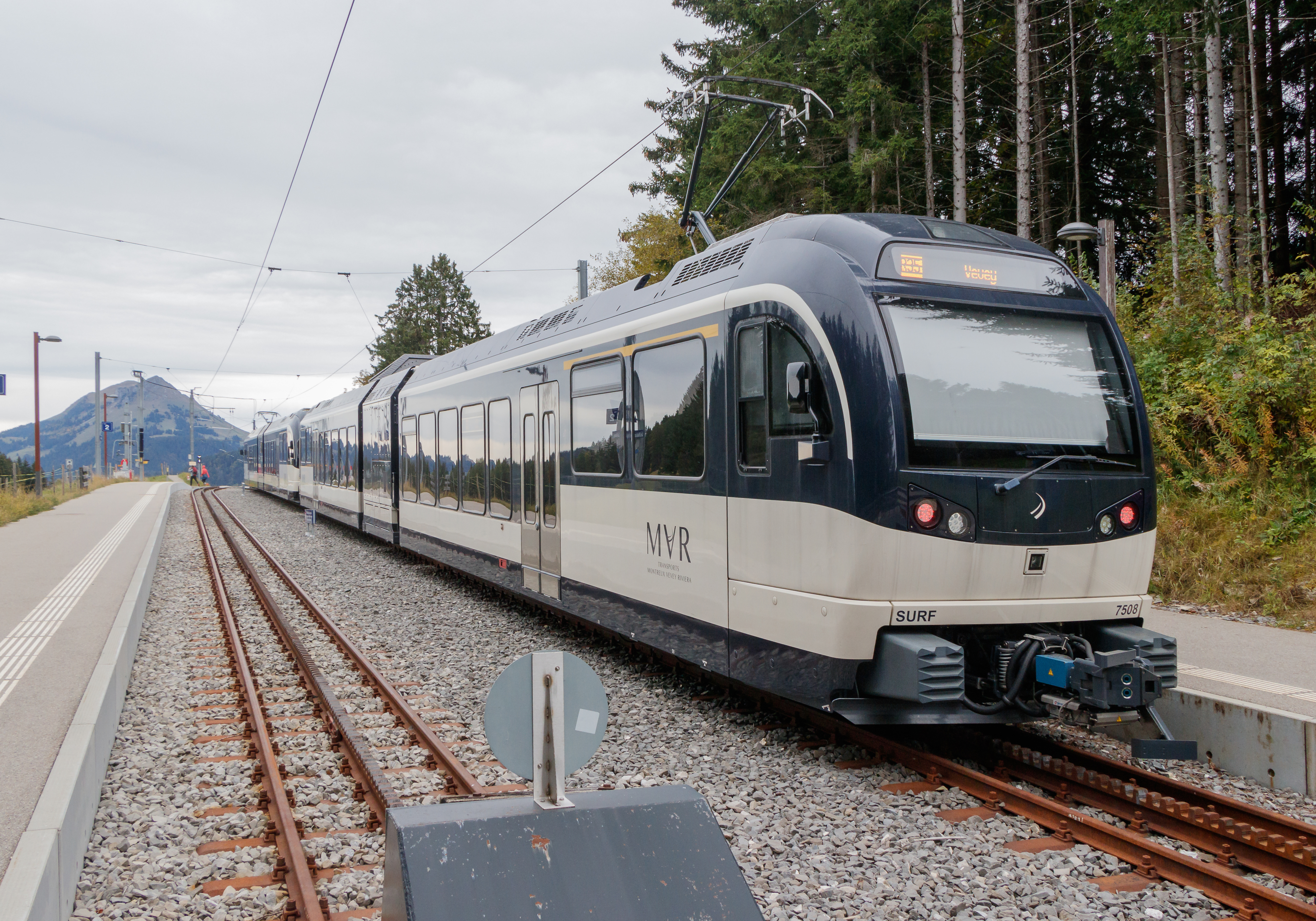
- A train at the station in 2024

General information
- Location: Blonay – Saint-Légier, Vaud; Switzerland
- Coordinates: 46°28′59″N 6°54′36″E
- Elevation: 1,348 m (4,423 ft)
- Owner: Transports Montreux–Vevey–Riviera
- Line: Vevey–Les Pléiades line
- Distance: 4.8 km (3.0 mi) from Blonay
- Platforms: 2 side platforms
- Tracks: 2
- Train operators: Transports Montreux–Vevey–Riviera

Construction
- Accessible: Yes

Other information
- Station code: 8501288 (PLEI)

History
- Opened: 8 July 1911

Passengers
- 2023: 120 per weekday (MVR)

Services
Preceding station	Transports Montreux–Vevey–Riviera	Following station
Lally towards Vevey	R35	Terminus
Location

Les Pléiades railway station (French: Gare des Pléiades), is a railway station in the municipality of Blonay – Saint-Légier, in the Swiss canton of Vaud. It is the northern terminus of the 1,000 mm (3 ft 3 3/8 in) metre gauge Vevey–Les Pléiades line of Transports Montreux–Vevey–Riviera. It serves the nearby Les Pléiades mountain.

== Services ==
As of the December 2024 timetable change, the following services stop at Les Pléiades:

- Regio: hourly service to Vevey.

== Bibliography ==
- Wägli, Hans G.; Jacobi, Sébastien (2010). Schienennetz Schweiz - Bahnprofil Schweiz CH+ [Swiss rail network] (in German) (3rd ed.). Zürich: AS Verlag. ISBN 978-3-909111-74-9.
