= Vevey railway station =

Railway station in Vevey, Switzerland

Vevey
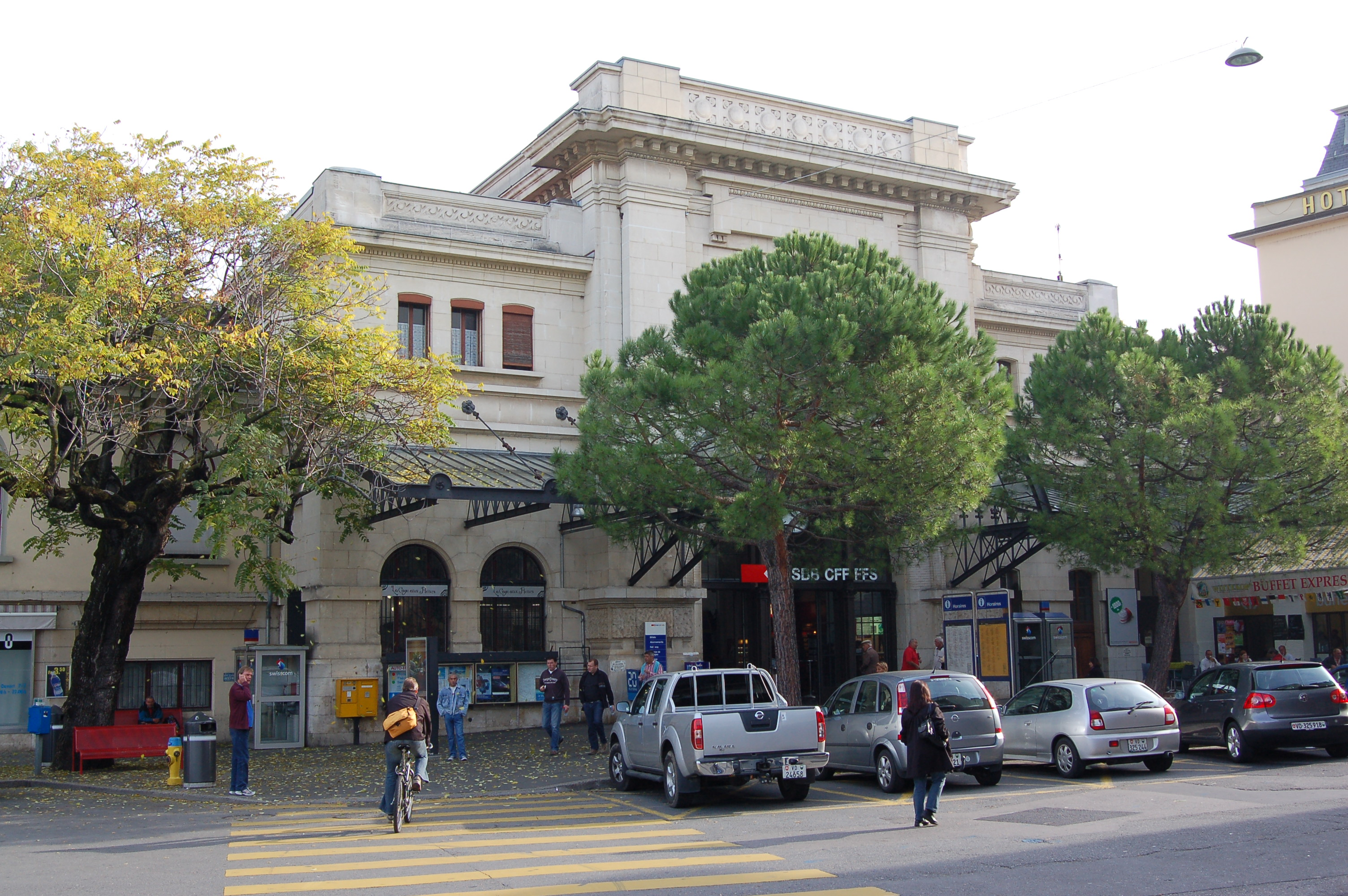
- The entrance to the station in 2008

General information
- Location: Place de la Gare; Vevey; Switzerland
- Coordinates: 46°27′47″N 6°50′36″E
- Elevation: 386 m (1,266 ft)
- Owner: Swiss Federal Railways
- Lines: Simplon line; Vevey–Chexbres line; Vevey–Les Pléiades line
- Distance: 18.4 km (11.4 mi) from Lausanne
- Platforms: 5
- Tracks: 6
- Train operators: Swiss Federal Railways; Transports Montreux–Vevey–Riviera
- Connections: VMCA buses and trolleybuses

Construction
- Parking: Yes (46 spaces)
- Cycle facilities: Yes (434 spaces)
- Accessible: Partly

Other information
- Station code: 8501200 (VV)
- IATA code: ZKZ
- Fare zone: 70 (mobilis)

History
- Opened: 2 April 1861

Passengers
- 2025: 27,400 per day (MOB, SBB)
- Rank: 26 out of 1,095

Services
Preceding station	SBB CFF FFS	Following station
Lausanne towards Geneva Airport	IR 90	Montreux towards Brig
Lausanne towards Geneva Airport	IR 95	Montreux towards Brig
Lausanne towards Annemasse or Geneva Airport	RE33	Montreux towards St-Maurice or Martigny
Lausanne Terminus	RegioExpress Limited service	La Tour-de-Peilz towards St-Maurice
Lausanne Terminus	RegioExpress Limited service	Burier One-way operation
Palézieux towards Fribourg/Freiburg	VosAlpes Express	Aigle towards Le Châble VS
Preceding station	RER Vaud	Following station
Cully towards Vallorbe	R3	Terminus towards Vevey
St-Saphorin towards Le Brassus or Vallorbe	R4	Terminus towards Vevey
Chexbres-Village towards Palézieux	R7	Terminus
Corseaux-Cornalles Limited service towards Palézieux	R7	Terminus
Preceding station	Transports Montreux–Vevey–Riviera	Following station
Vevey Vignerons towards Blonay or Les Pléiades	R35	Terminus
Location

Vevey railway station (French: Gare de Vevey) is a public transport hub not far from the shore of Lake Geneva. It serves the municipality of Vevey, in the Canton of Vaud, Switzerland.

SBB-CFF-FFS passenger trains call here while operating on the lakeside section of the standard gauge Simplon railway line. The station is also the western terminus of the standard gauge Chemin de fer Vevey-Chexbres to Puidoux-Chexbres on the Olten–Lausanne railway line, and a metre gauge line from Vevey to Blonay and Les Pléiades.

== History ==
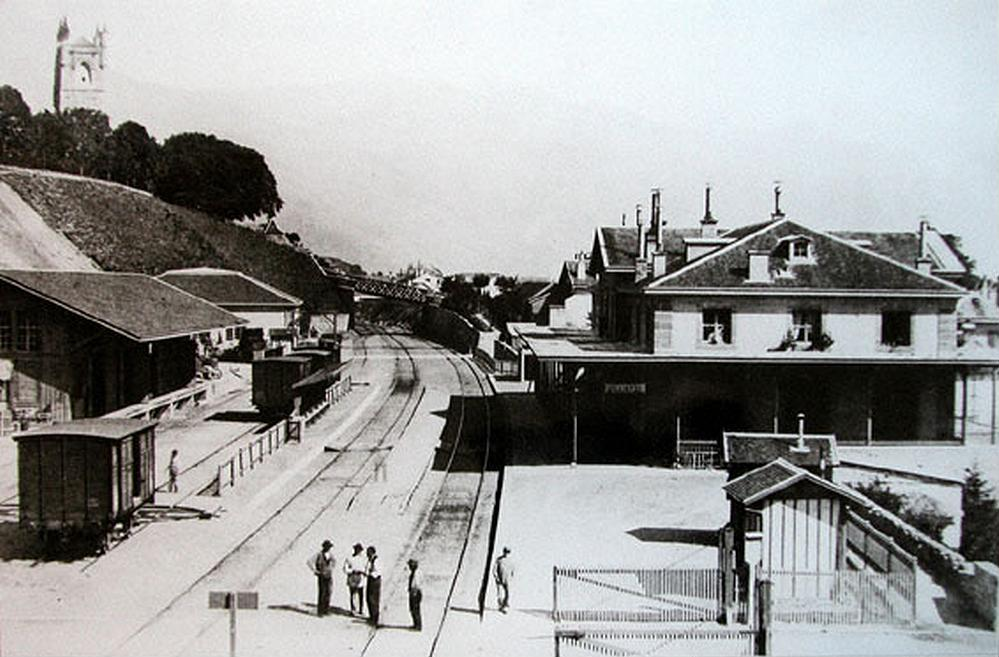
station (before 1902)

Vevey station was opened on 2 April 1861, when the then Jura–Simplon Railway (JS) opened the Lausanne–Villeneuve section of its standard gauge Simplon railway line to Sion. This line is now owned and operated by SBB-CFF-FFS.

In 1902, operations began on the present day Transports Montreux–Vevey–Riviera metre gauge line to Blonay and Les Pléiades. In 1904, the line to Châtel-Saint-Denis, also metre gauge, became available for traffic. In the same year, the standard gauge Chemin de fer Vevey–Chexbres (VCh) line was opened to link Vevey with Puidoux-Chexbres.

The metre gauge line to Chatel-Saint-Denis was closed in 1969 and was replaced by VMCV bus line 13.

== Location ==
The station is about 300 metres (980 ft) north of the lakeside marketplace. In the immediate vicinity can be found the Centre Saint-Antoine and Midi-Coindet shopping centres, which combine to form one of the largest shopping facilities in western Switzerland. Next to the station, in the old post office building, is the Coop Pronto office, amongst others.

== Layout ==
As at the nearby Montreux railway station, access to the main platform is from the first floor of the station building, instead of the ground floor. The track system comprises one side and two centre platforms, along with some goods tracks.

Tracks 1 and 3 are reserved for SBB-CFF-FFS traffic on the Simplon railway line (there is no track 2).

Track 5, which is located with track 3 and the short track 4 on one of the centre platforms, serves the Train des Vignes as R7 to Palézieux.

The other centre platform, with tracks 6 (standard gauge) and 7 (metre gauge), which is in the western part of a small curve, usually serves only the MVR traffic to Blonay and Les Pléiades.

Unusually, there is a turntable at the Eastern end of the station connecting the standard gauge tracks 4/5 and the metre gauge track 8, (of which the last few metres before the turntable are dual gauge. It served to transfer vehicles (mostly freight wagons) from the standard gauge to metre gauge.

== Services ==
As of the December 2024 timetable change, the following services call at Vevey:

=== Swiss Federal Railways ===
- InterRegio: half-hourly service between Geneva Airport and Brig.
- VosAlpes Express: daily direct service between Le Châble VS and Fribourg/Freiburg on weekends between December and April.
- RegioExpress:
  - half-hourly service (hourly on weekends) between Annemasse and St-Maurice, and hourly service from St-Maurice to Martigny. On weekends, hourly service to Geneva Airport.
  - two round-trips in each direction between Lausanne and St-Maurice.

=== RER Vaud ===
- RER Vaud:
  - R3 / R4: half-hourly (hourly on weekends) service between Vallorbe and Bex; hourly service to Le Brassus; limited service to St-Maurice on weekdays.
  - R7: hourly service to Palézieux.

=== Transports Montreux–Vevey–Riviera ===
- Regio R35: service every 15 minutes or half-hourly service to Blonay and hourly service from Blonay to Les Pléiades.

=== Blonay-Chamby Museum Railway ===
- 'Riviera Belle Epoque' vintage steam train, the last Sunday morning of each month (May - October inclusive) to the railway museum, and a historical electric train to Blonay in the afternoon.

== Bus service ==
The VMCV serves the station (Vevey Gare) with various lines:

- Line 201 (a trolleybus line): Vevey Funi–Vevey Gare–La Tour-de-Peilz–Montreux–Chillon–Villeneuve–Rennaz
- Line 202: Vevey, Pra – Vevey, gare – Vevey, Charmontey
- Line 211: Vevey–Corsier–Corseaux
- Line 212: Vevey–Funiculaire–Corsier–Nant/Fenil Vieille Rte
- Line 213: Vevey – Jongny – Monts-de-Corsier – Châtel-Saint-Denis
- Line 215: Vevey, Marché – Vevey, gare – St-Légier
- Line 216: Vevey – Jongny – Attalens – Bossonnens
- Line 217: Vevey – Jongny – Attalens – Palézieux
- Line 218 : Vevey – Corseaux – Chexbres

== Gallery ==
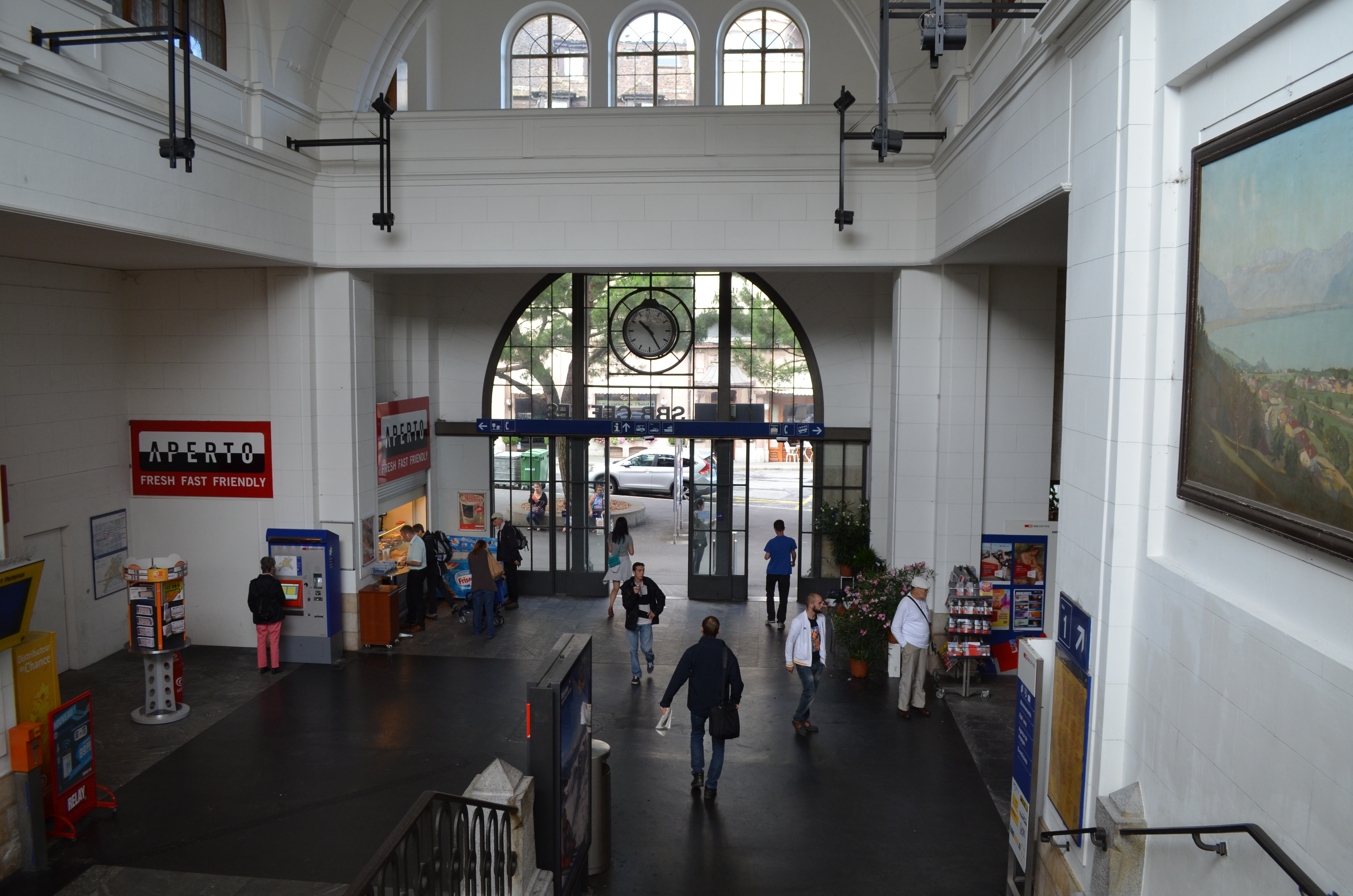
entrance hall, main entrance (2016)

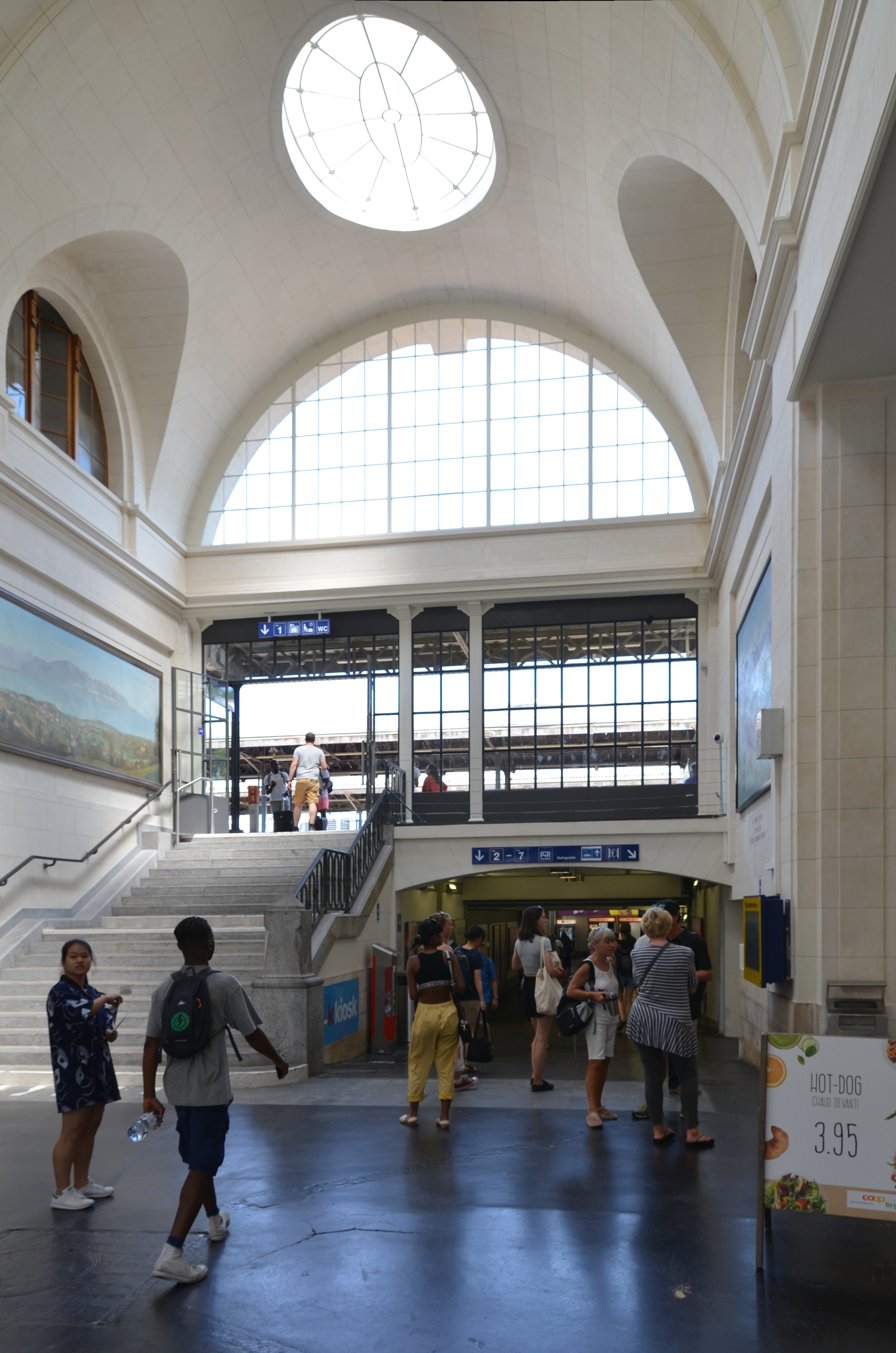
entrance hall, underpass and stairs to platform with track #1 (2019)

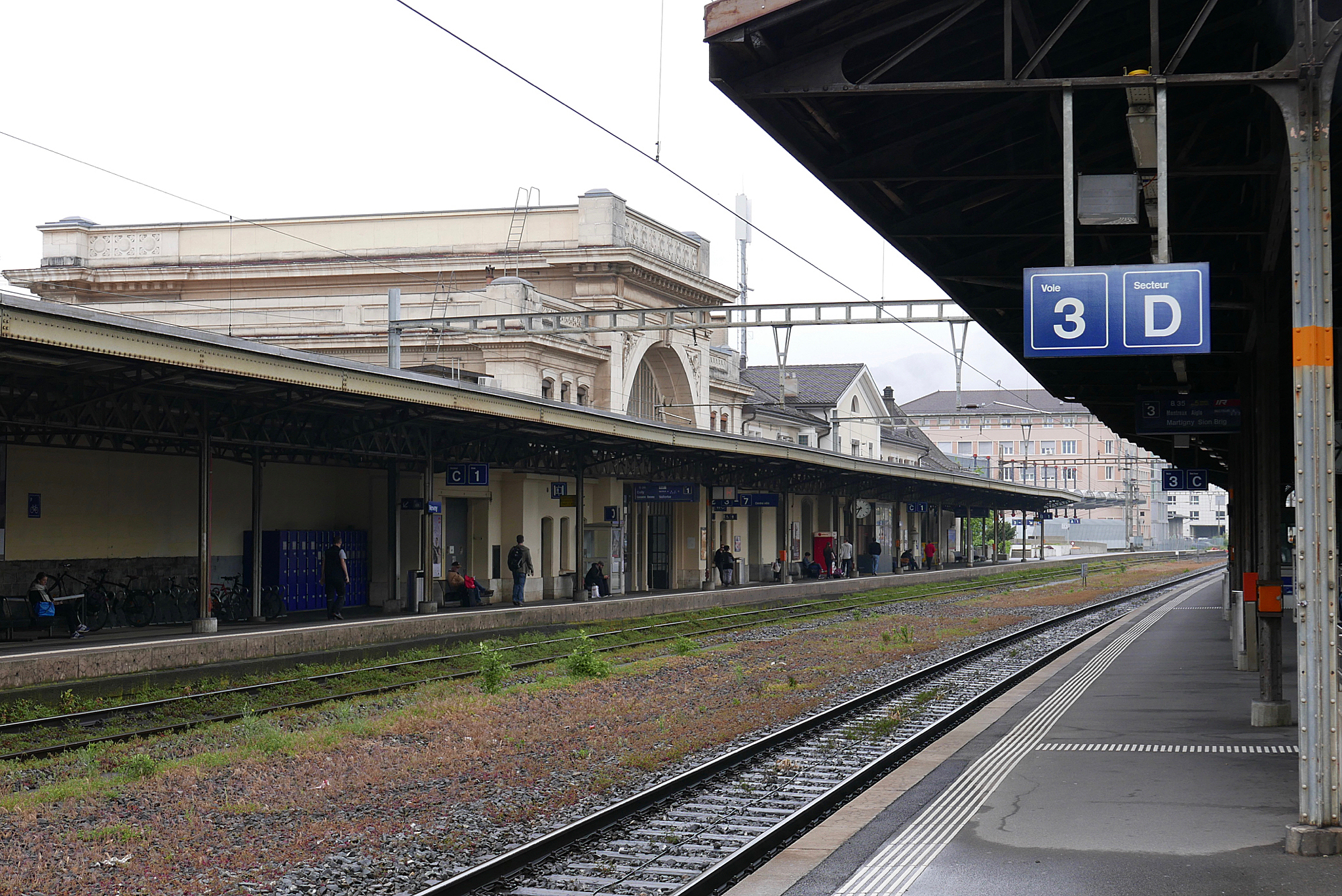
station building (2016)

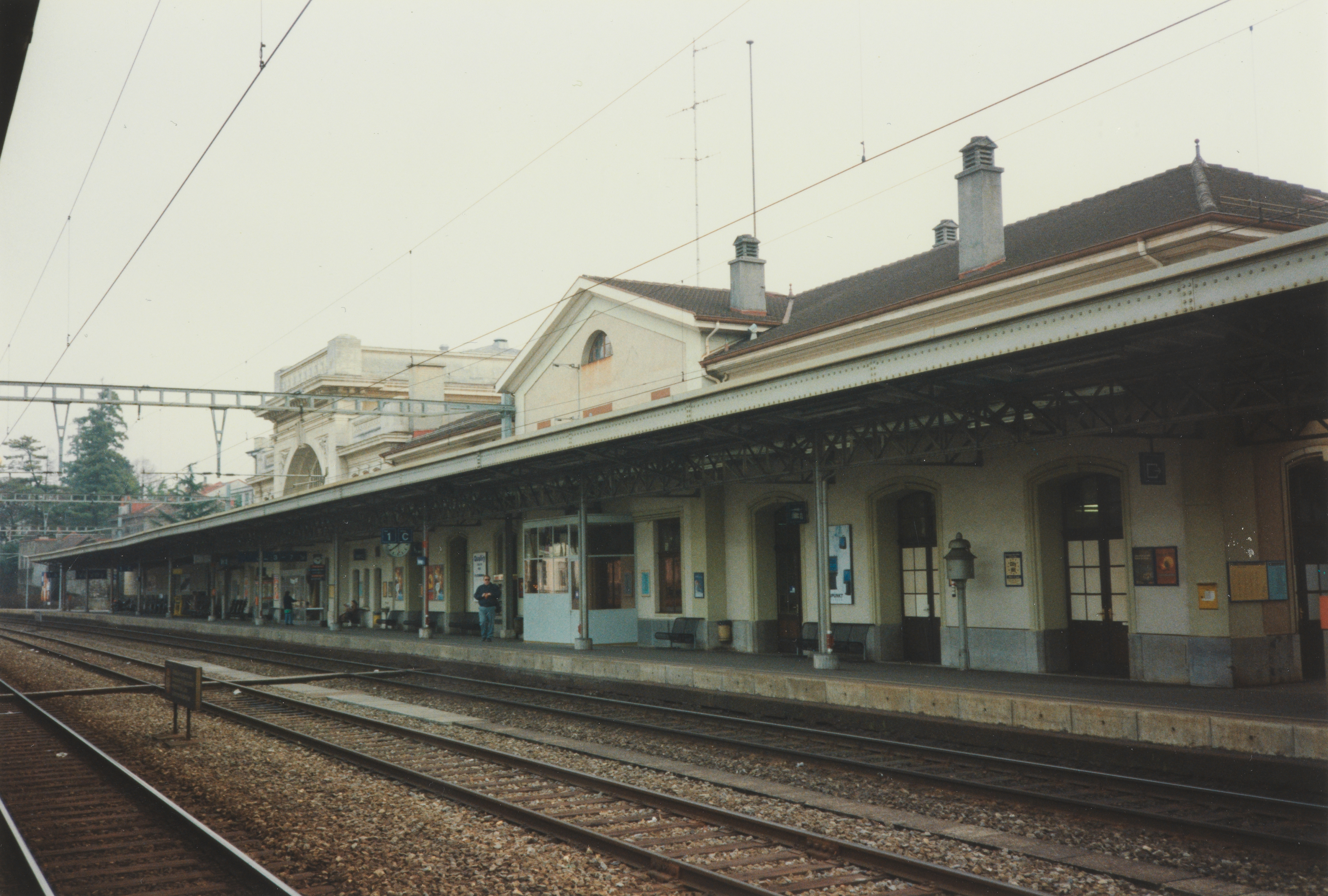
station building (1995), with a third track

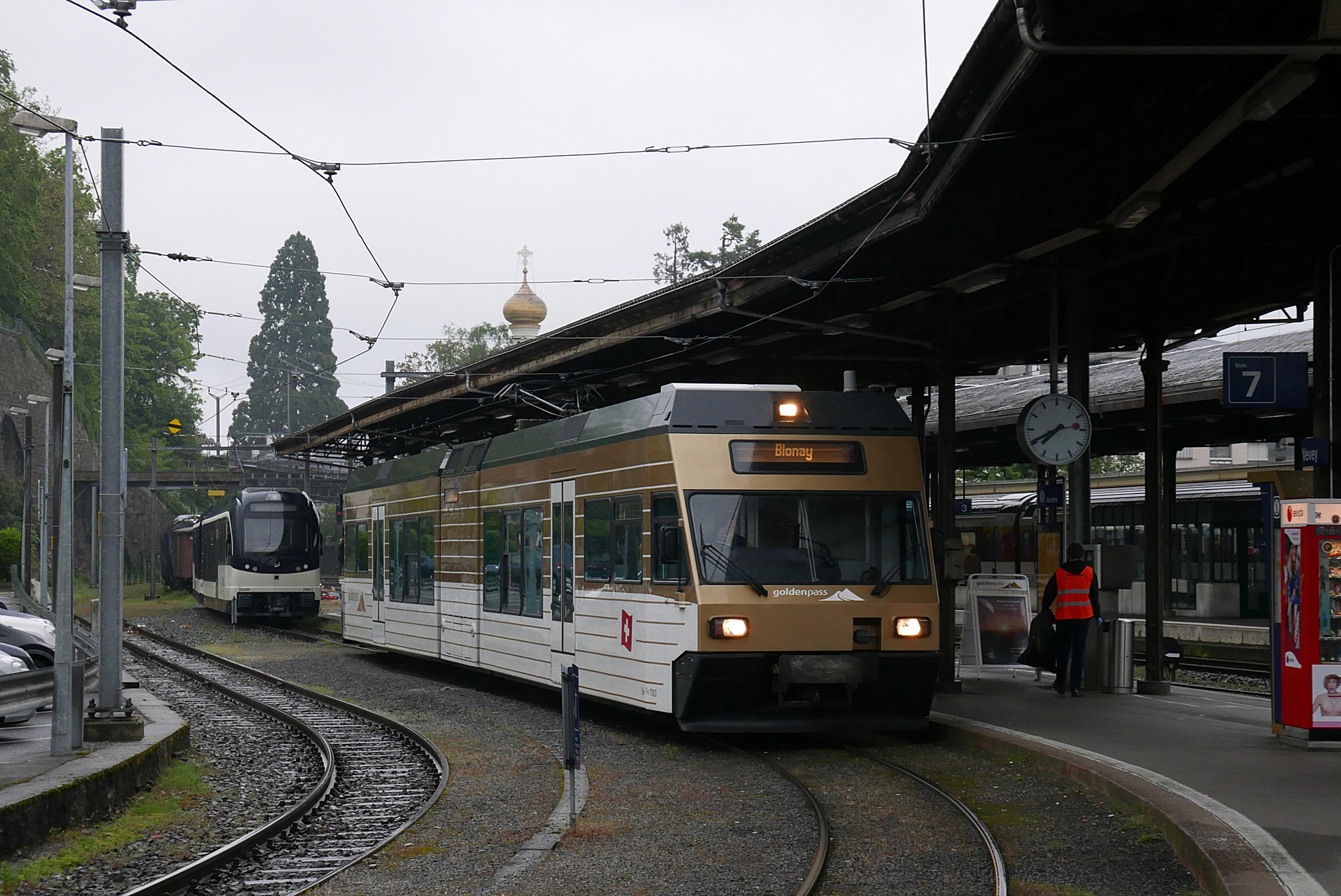
track #7, metre gauge, MVR train to Blonay (2016)
