= Blonay – Saint-Légier =

- Municipality
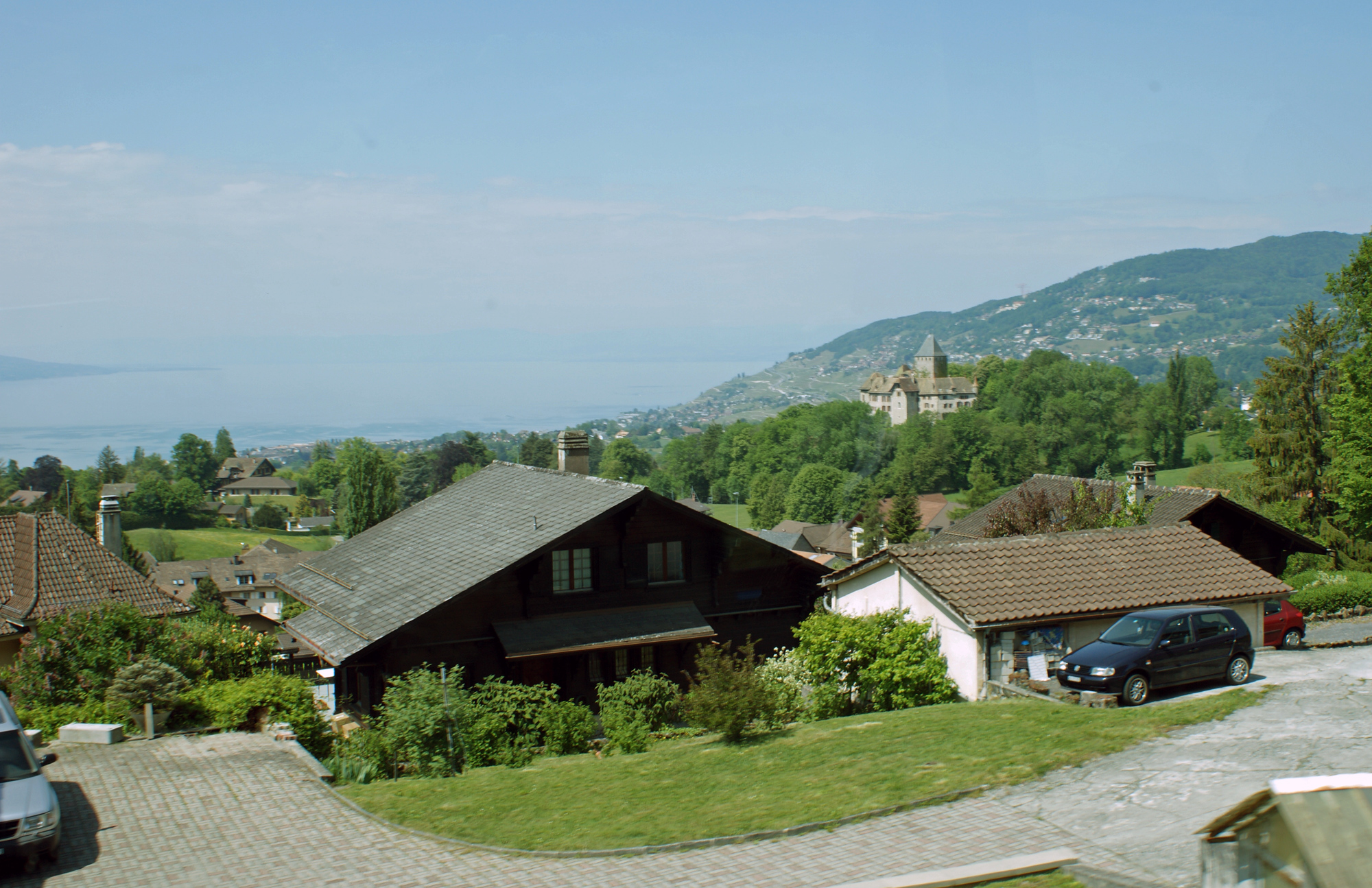
- Blonay village

- Flag Coat of arms
- Location of Blonay – Saint-Légier
- Location within Switzerland Location within Canton of Vaud
- Coordinates: 46°27′55″N 06°53′41″E
- Country: Switzerland
- Canton: Vaud
- District: Riviera-Pays-d'Enhaut

Government
  - Mayor: Syndic; Alain Bovay

Area
  - Total: 31.24 km^{2} (12.06 sq mi)
- Elevation: 618 m (2,028 ft)

Population (31.12.24)
  - Total: 12,464
  - Density: 399.0/km^{2} (1,033/sq mi)
- Time zone: UTC+01:00 (CET)
  - Summer (DST): UTC+02:00 (CEST)
- Postal codes: 1806; 1807
- SFOS number: 5892
- ISO 3166 code: CH-VD
- Localities: Bains-de-l'Alliaz, L'Alliaz, Lally, Les Chevalleyres, Les Pléiades, Clies, Hauteville, La Chiésaz
- Surrounded by: Châtel-Saint-Denis (FR), Haut-Intyamon (FR), Montreux, La Tour-de-Peilz
- Website: traitdunion-fusion.ch

Blonay – Saint-Légier is a municipality in the district of Riviera-Pays-d'Enhaut in the canton of Vaud in Switzerland. It was established on 1 January 2022 with the merger of the municipalities of Blonay and Saint-Légier-La Chiésaz.

== History ==
Blonay was first mentioned in 861 as Blodennaco. In 1108 it was mentioned as Bloniaco. During the 13th century it was known as Blonay, Blonai and Blunai. Saint-Légier-La Chiésaz was first mentioned in 1228 as Sanctus Leodegarus. On 1 January 2022 the former municipalities of Blonay and Saint-Légier-La Chiésaz merged into the new municipality of Blonay – Saint-Légier.
