= Vevey–Les Pléiades railway line =

Railway line in Switzerland

Vevey–Les Pléiades
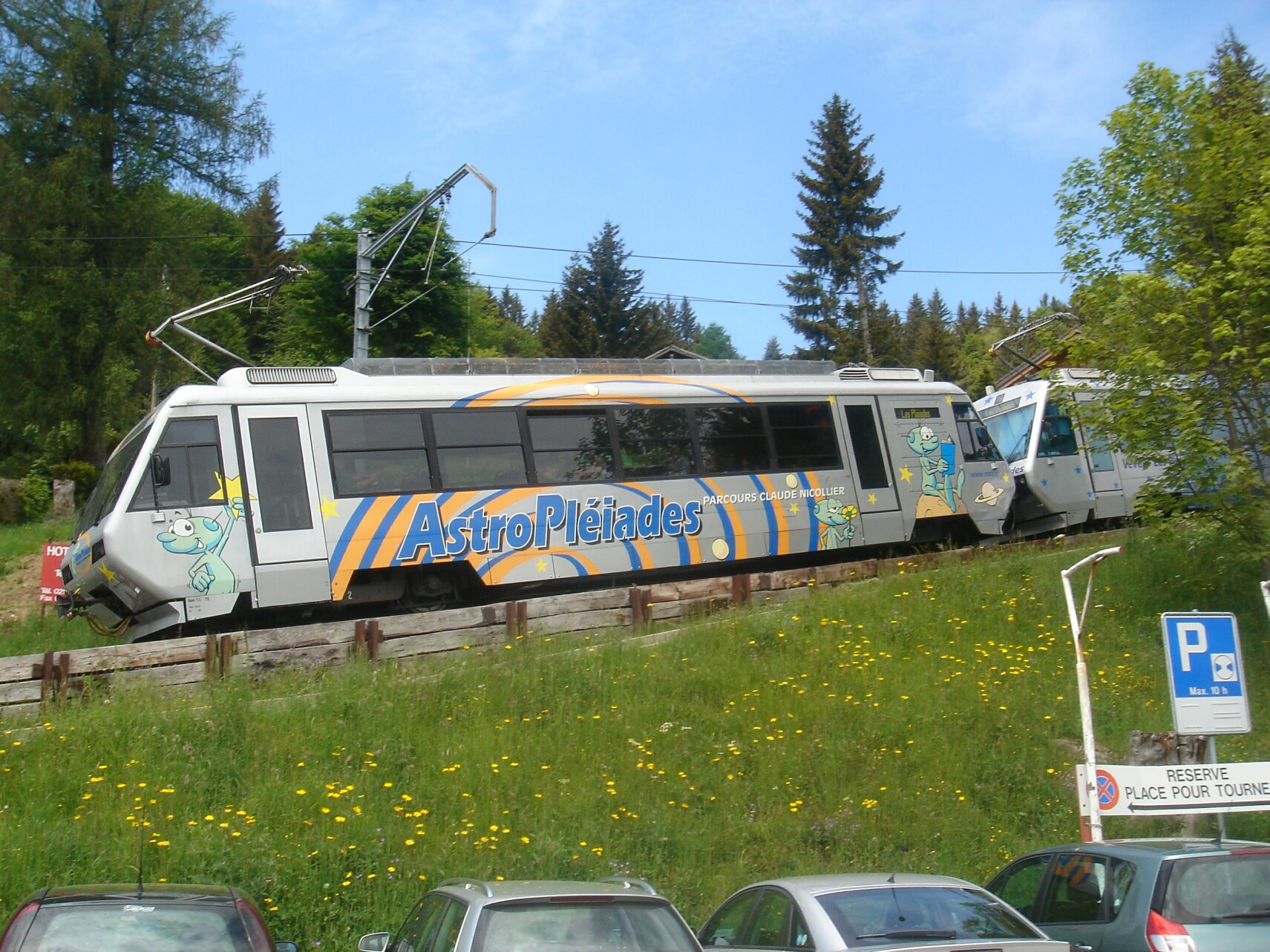
- MVR Beh 2/4 72 departing Lally for Les Pléiades in 2007

Overview
- Owner: Transports Montreux–Vevey–Riviera
- Line number: 112
- Termini: Vevey; Les Pléiades
- Stations: 15

Technical
- Line length: 10.5 km (6.5 mi)
- Rack system: Strub (Blonay–Les Pléiades)
- Track gauge: 1,000 mm (3 ft 3 3/8 in) metre gauge
- Electrification: Overhead line, 900 V DC

The Vevey–Les Pléiades railway line is a 1,000 mm (3 ft 3 3/8 in) metre gauge railway line in the canton of Vaud, Switzerland. It runs 10.5 kilometres (6.5 mi) from Vevey, on Lake Geneva, to Les Pléiades, in the Swiss Prealps. The line is owned and operated by Transports Montreux–Vevey–Riviera (MVR). It was originally built by the Chemins de fer électriques Veveysans (CEV).

== History ==
The Chemins de fer électriques Veveysans opened a line between Vevey and Chamby on 1 October 1902. The extension from Blonay to Les Pléiades opened on 8 July 1911. The CEV and three other companies merged to become the Transports Montreux–Vevey–Riviera on 1 January 2001.
