= Transports Montreux–Vevey–Riviera =

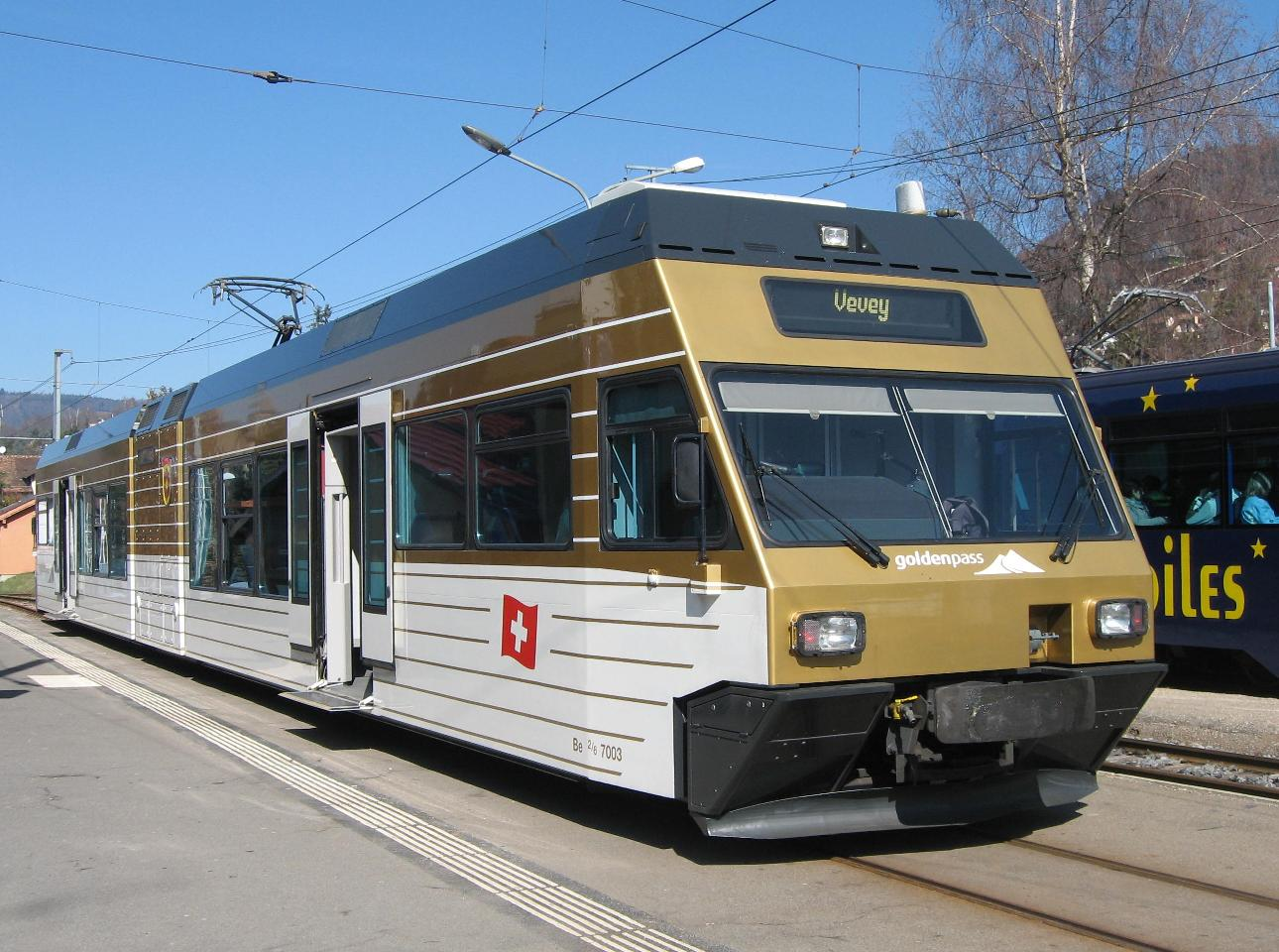
- Goldenpass Be 2/6 7003 Blonay at Blonay

Overview
- Locale: Canton of Vaud, Switzerland
- Dates of operation: 2001; 24 years ago –
- Predecessors: Chemins de fer électriques Veveysans; Chemin de fer Les Avants-Sonloup; Chemin de fer Montreux-Glion-Rochers-de-Naye; Chemin de fer funiculaire Vevey-Chardonne-Mont Pèlerin

The Transports Montreux–Vevey–Riviera (MVR) is a Swiss railway company. It was formed in 2001 from the merger of four railway companies: the Chemins de fer électriques Veveysans, the Chemin de fer Les Avants-Sonloup, the Chemin de fer Montreux-Glion-Rochers-de-Naye, and the Chemin de fer funiculaire Vevey-Chardonne-Mont Pèlerin. Since this time they have been added to the marketing portfolio of the Montreux Oberland Bernois Railway (MOB) group and are featured as part of their "GoldenPass services."

== History ==
The oldest part of the Transports Montreux–Vevey–Riviera network is the Territet–Glion funicular railway, which opened in 1883. This was joined at its upper terminus, Glion, in 1892 by the Chemin de fer Glion-Rochers-de-Naye, a rack railway using the system devised by Roman Abt. This gave a link between the shores of Lake Geneva and the summit of Rochers-de-Naye. A direct link was established with the opening of the Chemin de fer Montreux-Glion in 1909. The Chemin de fer Glion-Rochers-de-Naye and Chemin de fer Montreux-Glion merged in 1987 to form the Chemin de fer Montreux-Glion-Rochers-de-Naye, which in turn merged with the Chemin de fer funiculaire Territet-Glion in 1992 to create the Chemin de fer Montreux-Territet-Glion-Rochers-de-Naye (MTGN).

The Chemin de fer funiculaire Vevey-Chardonne-Mont Pèlerin built the Vevey–Chardonne–Mont Pèlerin funicular railway in 1900. The Chemins de fer électriques Veveysans opened the Vevey–Les Pléiades railway line in stages between 1902 and 1911. Unlike the funicular at Glion, there is no direct connection between the two lines; the lower terminus of the Mont Pèlerin funicular lies on the Vevey–Chexbres railway line of Swiss Federal Railways.

The final part of the MVR network is the Les Avants–Sonloup funicular. This was built by the Chemin de fer Les Avants-Sonloup and opened in 1910. The lower terminus of this funicular has a connection with the Montreux–Lenk im Simmental line of the Montreux Oberland Bernois Railway.
