= Chardonne =

Municipality in the canton of Vaud, Switzerland

- Municipality
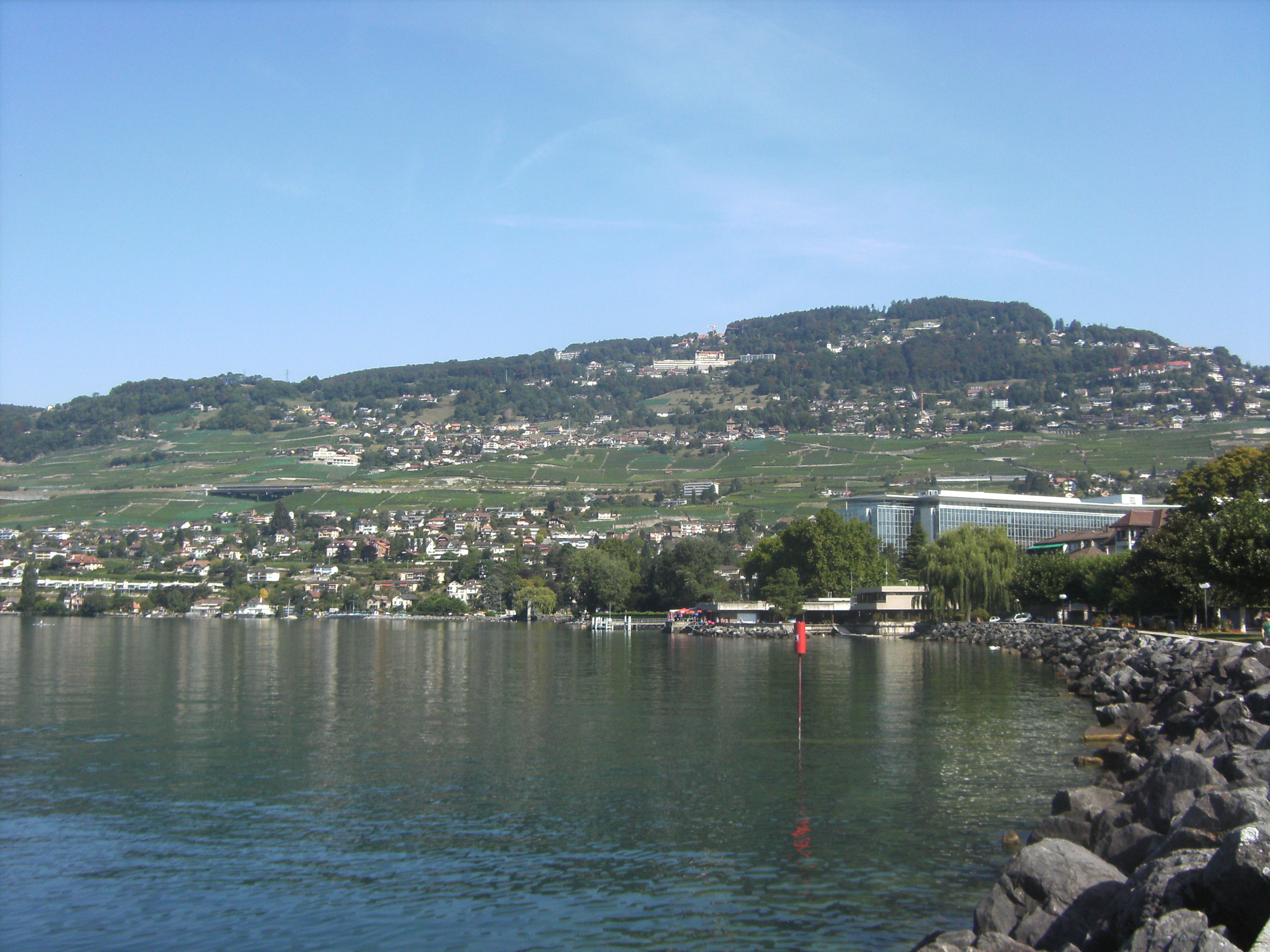
- Mont Pèlerin in Chardonne municipality, seen from Vevey with Corseaux in the middle ground. Chardonne is also on Lake Geneva, to the west of Corseaux.

- Flag Coat of arms
- Location of Chardonne
- Location within Switzerland Location within Canton of Vaud
- Coordinates: 46°29′N 06°50′E
- Country: Switzerland
- Canton: Vaud
- District: Riviera-Pays-d'Enhaut

Government
  - Mayor: Syndic; Serge Jacquin

Area
  - Total: 12.94 km^{2} (5.00 sq mi)
- Elevation: 586 m (1,923 ft)

Population (2004)
  - Total: 2,685
  - Density: 207.5/km^{2} (537.4/sq mi)
- Demonym(s): Les Chardonnerets; Lè Tserdignolet
- Time zone: UTC+01:00 (CET)
  - Summer (DST): UTC+02:00 (CEST)
- Postal codes: 1801 Le Mont-Pèlerin; 1803 Chardonne
- SFOS number: 5882
- ISO 3166 code: CH-VD
- Localities: Le Mont-Pèlerin
- Surrounded by: Granges (Veveyse) (FR), Attalens (FR), Jongny, Corsier-sur-Vevey, Corseaux, Saint-Saphorin (Lavaux), Puidoux
- Twin towns: Barbezieux-Saint-Hilaire (France)
- Website: www.chardonne.ch

Chardonne (French pronunciation: [ʃaʁdɔn]; Arpitan: Chardena) is a municipality in the Riviera-Pays-d'Enhaut district in the canton of Vaud in Switzerland.

== History ==
Chardonne is first mentioned in 1001 as Cardona.

== Geography ==
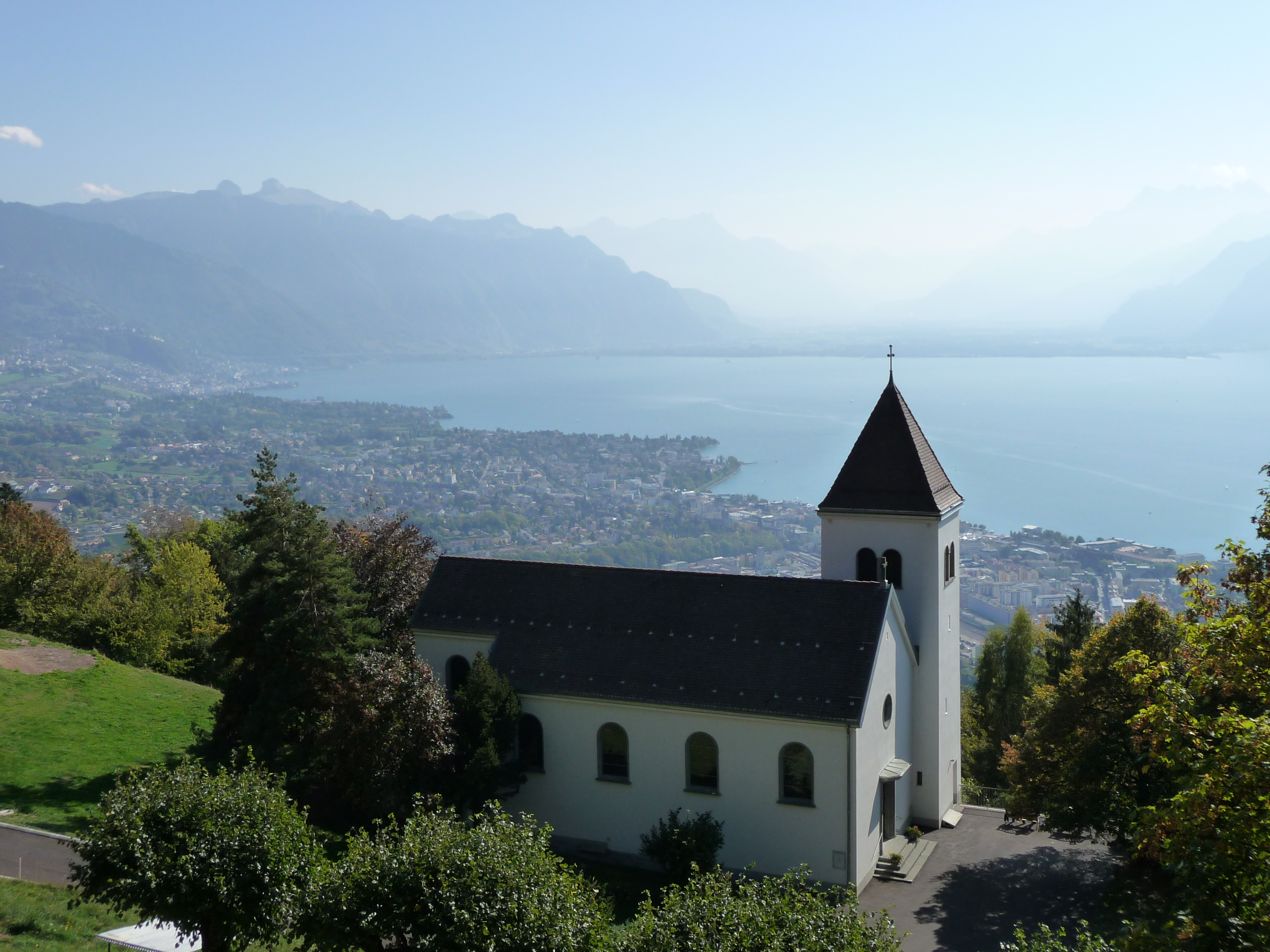
Chardonne church with Lake Geneva in the background

Aerial view: Chardonne and Mount Pèlerin (1960)

Chardonne has an area, as of 2009, of 10.3 square kilometers (4.0 mi^{2}). Of this area, 4.84 km^{2} (1.87 mi^{2}) or 46.9% is used for agricultural purposes, while 3.82 km^{2} (1.47 mi^{2}) or 37.0% is forested. Of the rest of the land, 1.59 km^{2} (0.61 mi^{2}) or 15.4% is settled (buildings or roads) and 0.04 km^{2} (9.9 acres) or 0.4% is unproductive land.

Of the built up area, housing and buildings make up 9.4% and transportation infrastructure makes up 5.1%. Out of the forested land, 33.2% of the total land area is heavily forested and 3.8% is covered with orchards or small clusters of trees. Of the agricultural land, 4.9% is used for growing crops and 29.0% is pastures, while 11.0% is used for orchards or vine crops and 1.9% is used for alpine pastures.

The municipality was part of the Vevey District until it was dissolved on 31 August 2006, and Chardonne became part of the new district of Riviera-Pays-d'Enhaut.

The municipality is located between Lake Geneva and Mont Pèlerin.

== Coat of arms ==
The blazon of the municipal coat of arms is Argent, from a triple Hill Vert growing three thistles proper, on outer two two finches proper. The birds are goldfinches (French: chardonneret) and with the thistles (French: chardon) it is an example of canting arms.

== Demographics ==
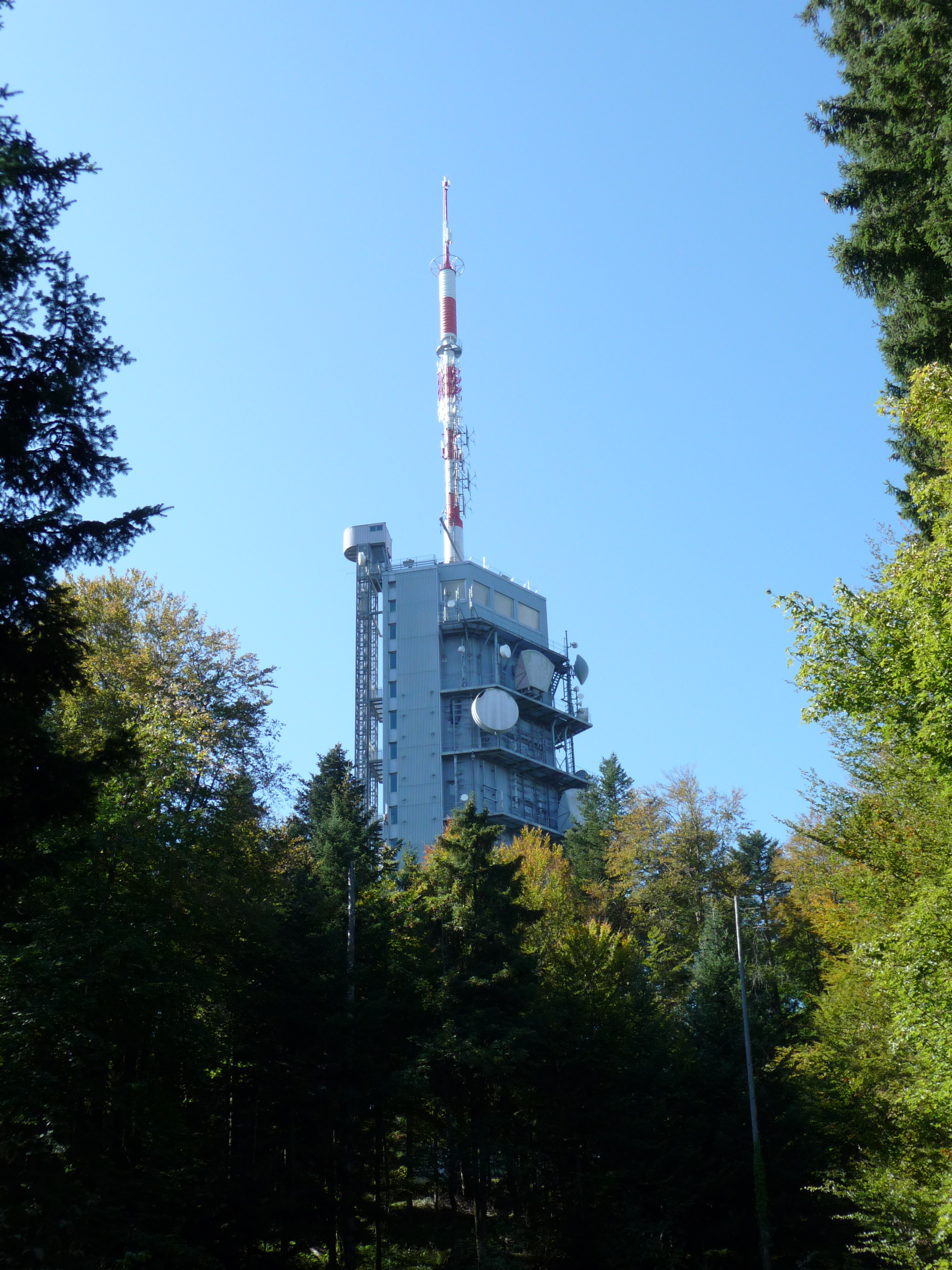
Television transmission tower on Mont Pèlerin

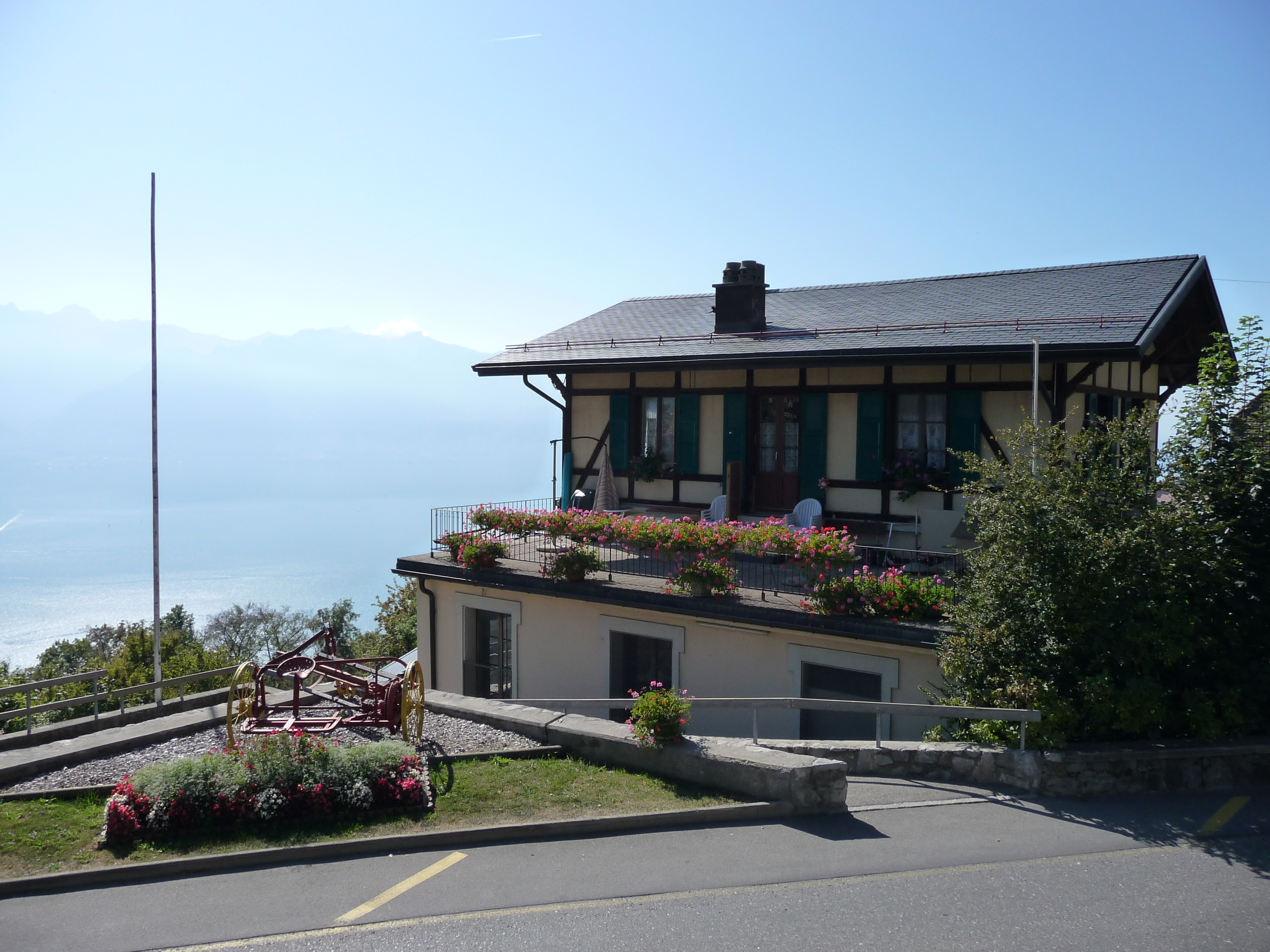
Mont Pèlerin cable car station

Chardonne has a population (as of December 2020) of 3,092. As of 2008, 23.2% of the population are resident foreign nationals. Over the last 10 years (1999–2009 ) the population has changed at a rate of 12.7%. It has changed at a rate of 17.8% due to migration and at a rate of -3.6% due to births and deaths.

Most of the population (as of 2000) speaks French (2,016 or 77.5%) as their first language, with German being second most common (226 or 8.7%) and English being third (112 or 4.3%). There are 23 people who speak Italian and 2 people who speak Romansh.

The age distribution, as of 2009, in Chardonne is; 266 children or 9.7% of the population are between 0 and 9 years old and 306 teenagers or 11.1% are between 10 and 19. Of the adult population, 203 people or 7.4% of the population are between 20 and 29 years old. 358 people or 13.0% are between 30 and 39, 508 people or 18.5% are between 40 and 49, and 392 people or 14.3% are between 50 and 59. The senior population distribution is 317 people or 11.5% of the population are between 60 and 69 years old, 235 people or 8.5% are between 70 and 79, there are 130 people or 4.7% who are between 80 and 89, and there are 35 people or 1.3% who are 90 and older.

As of 2000, there were 1,062 people who were single and never married in the municipality. There were 1,227 married individuals, 165 widows or widowers and 147 individuals who are divorced.

As of 2000, there were 1,018 private households in the municipality, and an average of 2.2 persons per household. There were 333 households that consist of only one person and 45 households with five or more people. Out of a total of 1,048 households that answered this question, 31.8% were households made up of just one person and there were 5 adults who lived with their parents. Of the rest of the households, there are 349 married couples without children, 269 married couples with children There were 39 single parents with a child or children. There were 23 households that were made up of unrelated people and 30 households that were made up of some sort of institution or another collective housing.

In 2000 there were 402 single family homes (or 56.8% of the total) out of a total of 708 inhabited buildings. There were 177 multi-family buildings (25.0%), along with 93 multi-purpose buildings that were mostly used for housing (13.1%) and 36 other use buildings (commercial or industrial) that also had some housing (5.1%).

In 2000, a total of 994 apartments (79.1% of the total) were permanently occupied, while 213 apartments (16.9%) were seasonally occupied and 50 apartments (4.0%) were empty. As of 2009, the construction rate of new housing units was 2.5 new units per 1000 residents. The vacancy rate for the municipality, in 2010, was 0.14%.

The historical population is given in the following chart:

== Heritage sites of national significance ==
The municipality is part of the UNESCO World Heritage Site: Lavaux, Vineyard Terraces, which is also listed as a Swiss heritage site of national significance.

== Politics ==
In the 2007 federal election the most popular party was the SP which received 19.31% of the vote. The next three most popular parties were the SP (19.31%), the FDP (18.43%) and the Green Party (16.56%). In the federal election, a total of 879 votes were cast, and the voter turnout was 50.7%.

== Economy ==
As of 2010, Chardonne had an unemployment rate of 3%. As of 2008, there were 109 people employed in the primary economic sector and about 29 businesses involved in this sector. 30 people were employed in the secondary sector and there were 12 businesses in this sector. 405 people were employed in the tertiary sector, with 50 businesses in this sector. There were 1,192 residents of the municipality who were employed in some capacity, of which females made up 42.5% of the workforce.

In 2008 the total number of full-time equivalent jobs was 432. The number of jobs in the primary sector was 66, all of which were in agriculture. The number of jobs in the secondary sector was 26 of which 15 or (57.7%) were in manufacturing and 12 (46.2%) were in construction. The number of jobs in the tertiary sector was 340. In the tertiary sector; 19 or 5.6% were in wholesale or retail sales or the repair of motor vehicles, 18 or 5.3% were in the movement and storage of goods, 101 or 29.7% were in a hotel or restaurant, 9 or 2.6% were in the information industry, 4 or 1.2% were the insurance or financial industry, 11 or 3.2% were technical professionals or scientists, 25 or 7.4% were in education and 119 or 35.0% were in health care.

In 2000, there were 274 workers who commuted into the municipality and 899 workers who commuted away. The municipality is a net exporter of workers, with about 3.3 workers leaving the municipality for every one entering. About 2.9% of the workforce coming into Chardonne are coming from outside Switzerland. Of the working population, 11.9% used public transportation to get to work, and 67.8% used a private car.

== Religion ==
From the 2000 census, 666 or 25.6% were Roman Catholic, while 1,179 or 45.3% belonged to the Swiss Reformed Church. Of the rest of the population, there were 10 members of an Orthodox church (or about 0.38% of the population), there were 2 individuals (or about 0.08% of the population) who belonged to the Christian Catholic Church, and there were 97 individuals (or about 3.73% of the population) who belonged to another Christian church. There was 1 individual who was Jewish, and 15 (or about 0.58% of the population) who were Islamic. There were 36 individuals who were Buddhist, 4 individuals who were Hindu and 1 individual who belonged to another church. 477 (or about 18.34% of the population) belonged to no church, are agnostic or atheist, and 150 individuals (or about 5.77% of the population) did not answer the question.

== Education ==
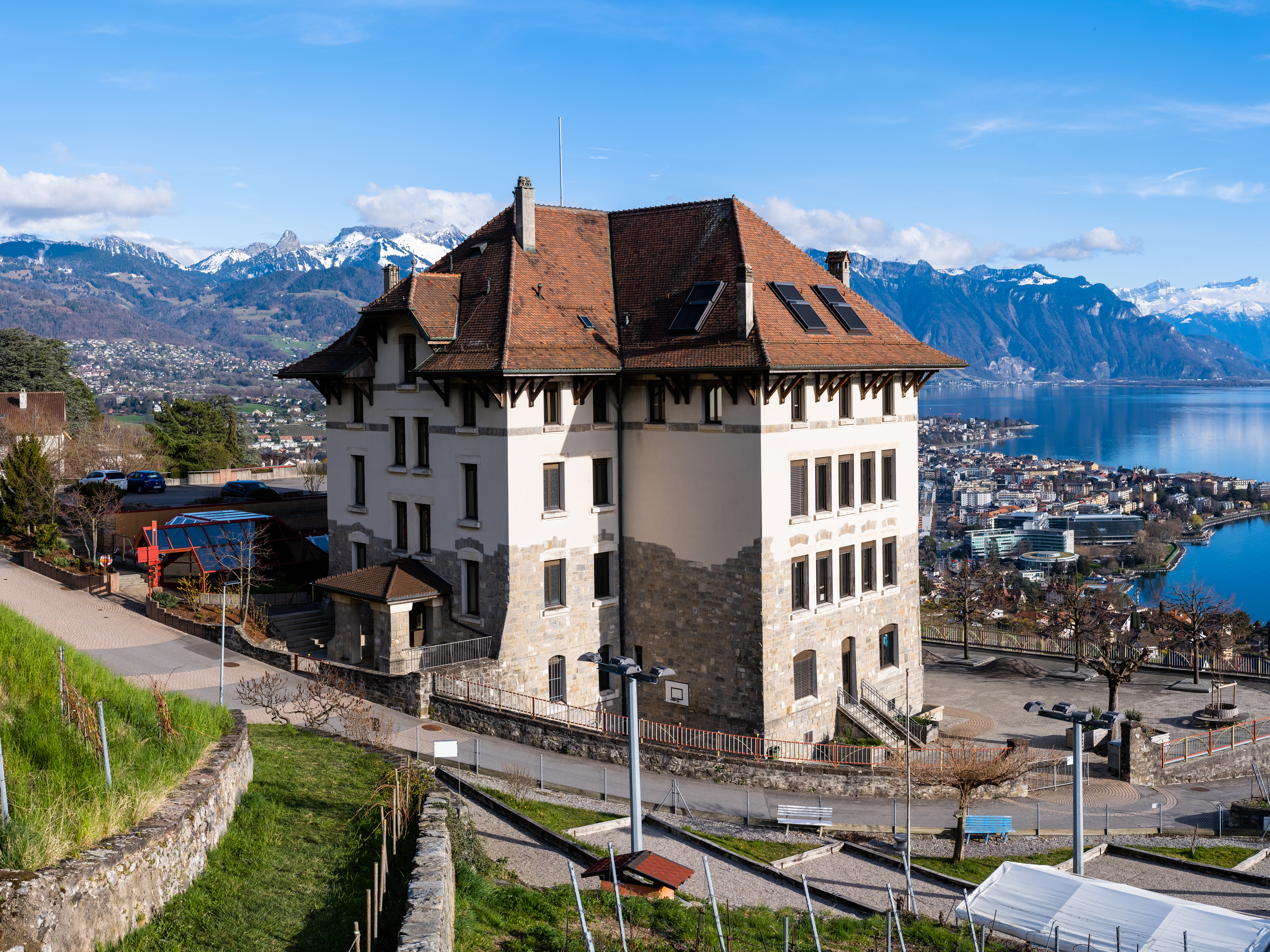
Collège de Chardonne

In Chardonne about 914 or (35.1%) of the population have completed non-mandatory upper secondary education, and 621 or (23.9%) have completed additional higher education (either university or a Fachhochschule). Of the 621 who completed tertiary schooling, 46.1% were Swiss men, 27.2% were Swiss women, 16.3% were non-Swiss men and 10.5% were non-Swiss women.

In the 2009/2010 school year there were a total of 248 students in the Chardonne school district. In the Vaud cantonal school system, two years of non-obligatory pre-school are provided by the political districts. During the school year, the political district provided pre-school care for a total of 817 children of which 456 children (55.8%) received subsidized pre-school care. The canton's primary school program requires students to attend for four years. There were 124 students in the municipal primary school program. The obligatory lower secondary school program lasts for six years and there were 124 students in those schools.

As of 2000, there were 22 students in Chardonne who came from another municipality, while 199 residents attended schools outside the municipality.
