= Blonay =

- Former municipality
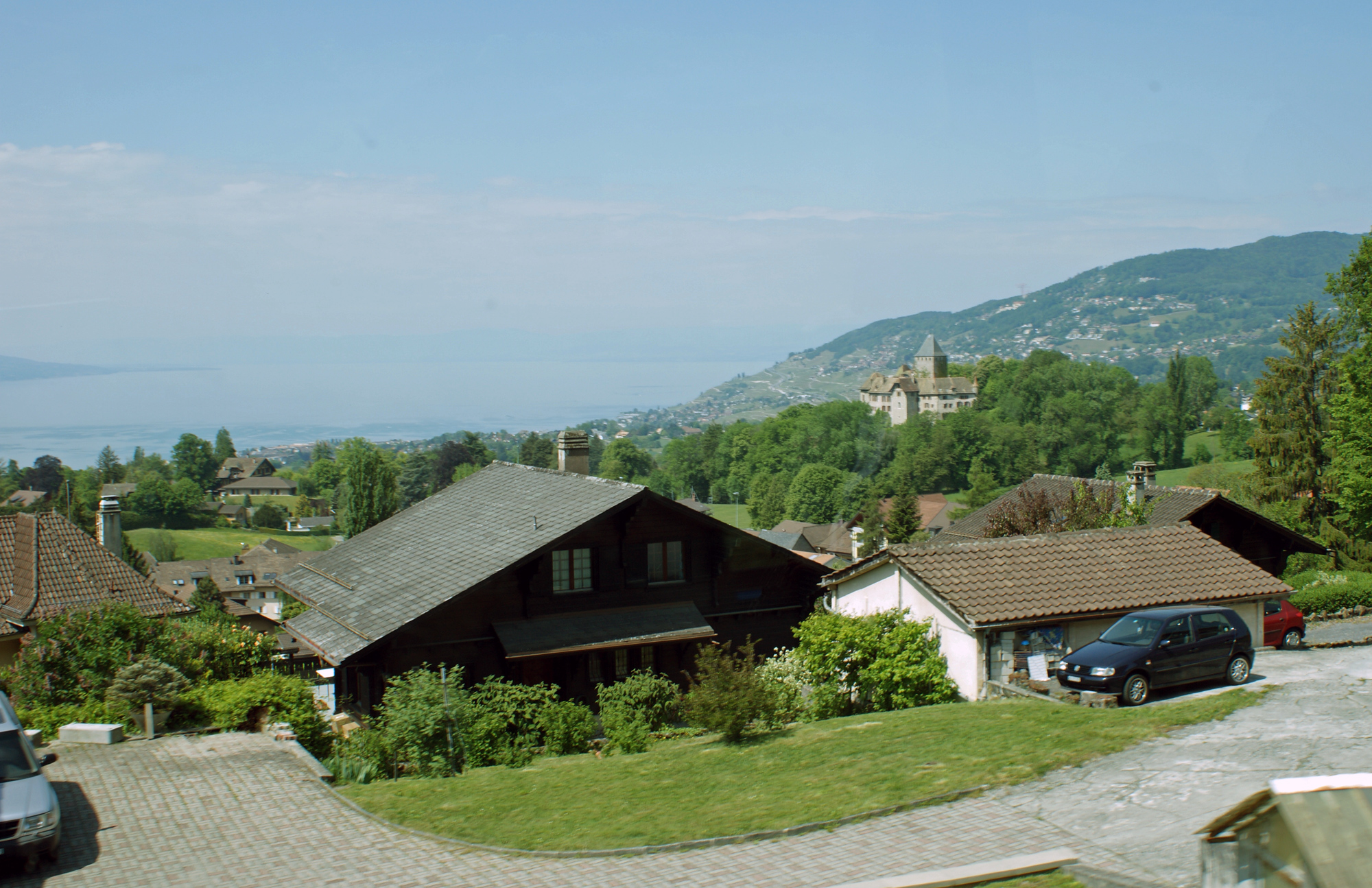
- Blonay village

- Flag Coat of arms
- Location of Blonay
- Location within Switzerland Location within Canton of Vaud
- Coordinates: 46°28′N 06°54′E
- Country: Switzerland
- Canton: Vaud
- District: Riviera-Pays-d'Enhaut

Government
  - Mayor: Syndic; Dominique Martin

Area
  - Total: 16.03 km^{2} (6.19 sq mi)
- Elevation: 622 m (2,041 ft)

Population (2004)
  - Total: 5,209
  - Density: 325.0/km^{2} (841.6/sq mi)
- Demonym(s): Les Blonaysans; Les Tire-Troncs; Lè Moutso
- Time zone: UTC+01:00 (CET)
  - Summer (DST): UTC+02:00 (CEST)
- Postal code: 1807
- SFOS number: 5881
- ISO 3166 code: CH-VD
- Localities: Bains-de-l'Alliaz, L'Alliaz, Lally, Les Chevalleyres, Les Pléiades
- Surrounded by: Saint-Légier-La Chiésaz, Châtel-Saint-Denis (FR), Haut-Intyamon (FR), Montreux, La Tour-de-Peilz
- Website: www.blonay.ch

Blonay (French pronunciation: [blɔnɛ]) is a former municipality in the district of Riviera-Pays-d'Enhaut in the canton of Vaud in Switzerland. On 1 January 2022, the former municipalities of Blonay and Saint-Légier-La Chiésaz merged into the new municipality of Blonay - Saint-Légier.

== History ==
Blonay is first mentioned in 861 as Blodennaco. In 1108, it was mentioned as Bloniaco. During the 13th Century, it was known as Blonay, Blonai, and Blunai.

== Geography ==
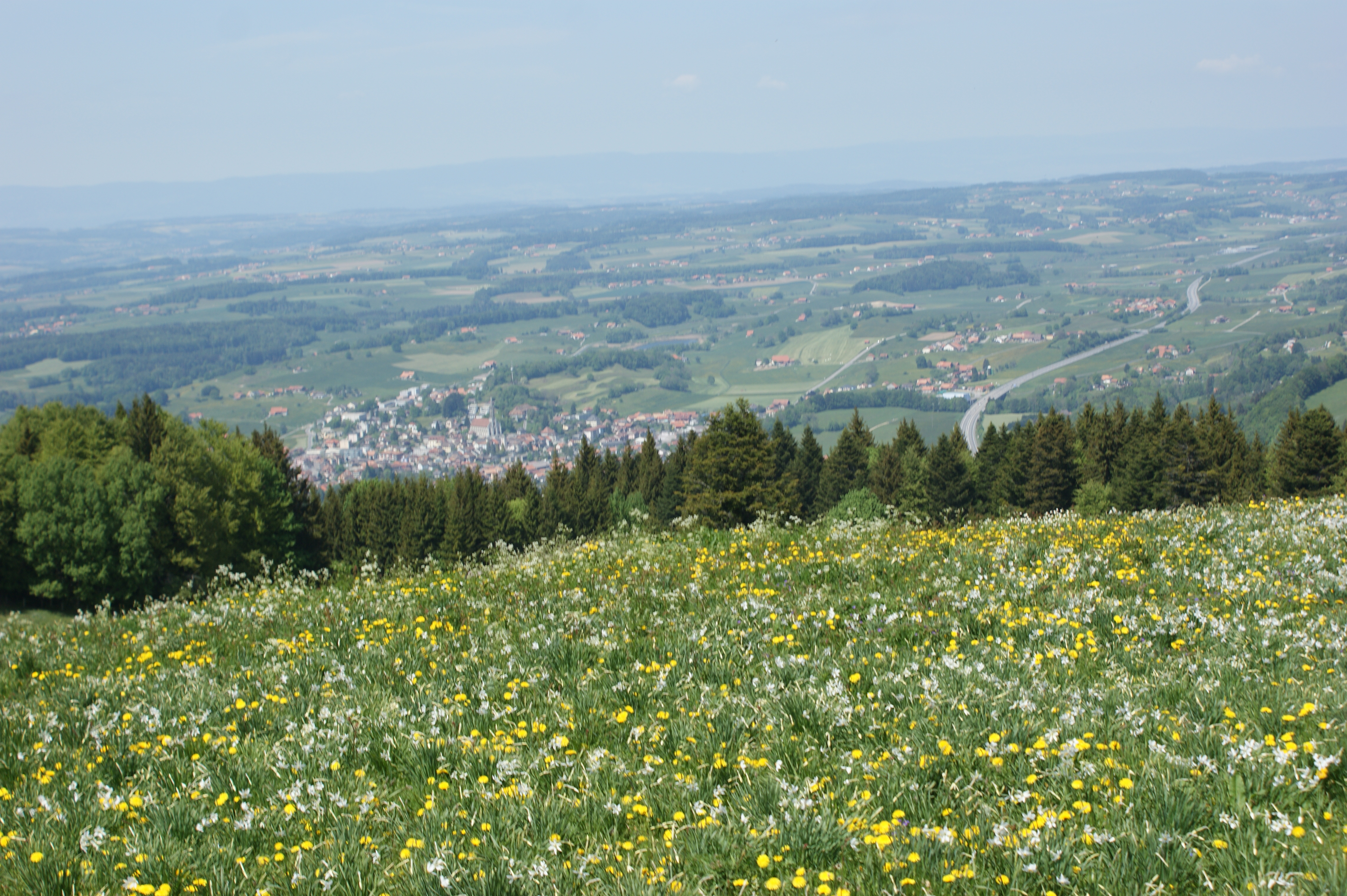
View toward Châtel-Saint-Denis from Les Pléiades

Blonay has an area, as of 2009, of 16.1 square kilometers (6.2 mi^{2}). Of this area, 5.34 km^{2} (2.06 mi^{2}) or 33.2% is used for agricultural purposes, while 7.41 km^{2} (2.86 mi^{2}) or 46.1% is forested. Of the rest of the land, 2.9 km^{2} (1.1 mi^{2}) or 18.0% is settled (buildings or roads), 0.07 km^{2} (17 acres) or 0.4% is either rivers or lakes and 0.32 km^{2} (0.12 mi^{2}) or 2.0% is unproductive land.

Of the built up area, housing and buildings made up 12.8% and transportation infrastructure made up 4.4%. Out of the forested land, 42.1% of the total land area is heavily forested and 3.0% is covered with orchards or small clusters of trees. Of the agricultural land, 1.9% is used for growing crops and 5.8% is pastures, while 3.0% is used for orchards or vine crops and 22.6% is used for alpine pastures. All the water in the municipality is flowing water.

The municipality was part of the Vevey District until it was dissolved on 31 August 2006, and Blonay became part of the new district of Riviera-Pays-d'Enhaut.

Blonay overlooks Lake Geneva, with the hill 'Les Pléiades' behind the town. The municipality stretches from an elevation of about 500 to 1,400 m (1,600 to 4,600 ft). It consists of the village of Blonay with the sections of Tercier and Cojonnex and a number of hamlets including Les Chevalleyres.

== Coat of arms ==
The blazon of the municipal coat of arms is Or, two hollow hearts Gules, interlaced one reversed

== Demographics ==
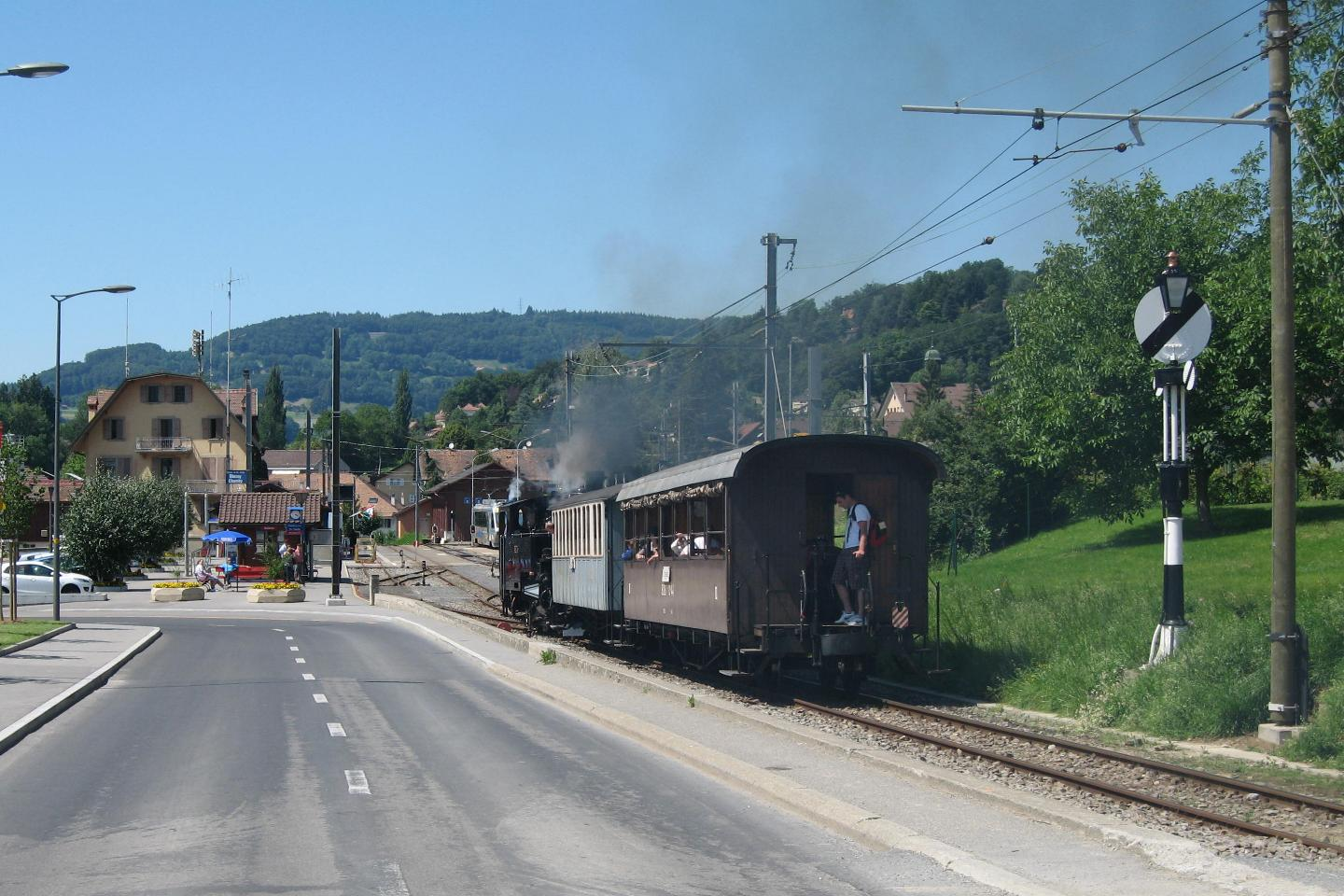
Train of the Blonay–Chamby Museum Railway in the foreground of the railway station Blonay, 2011

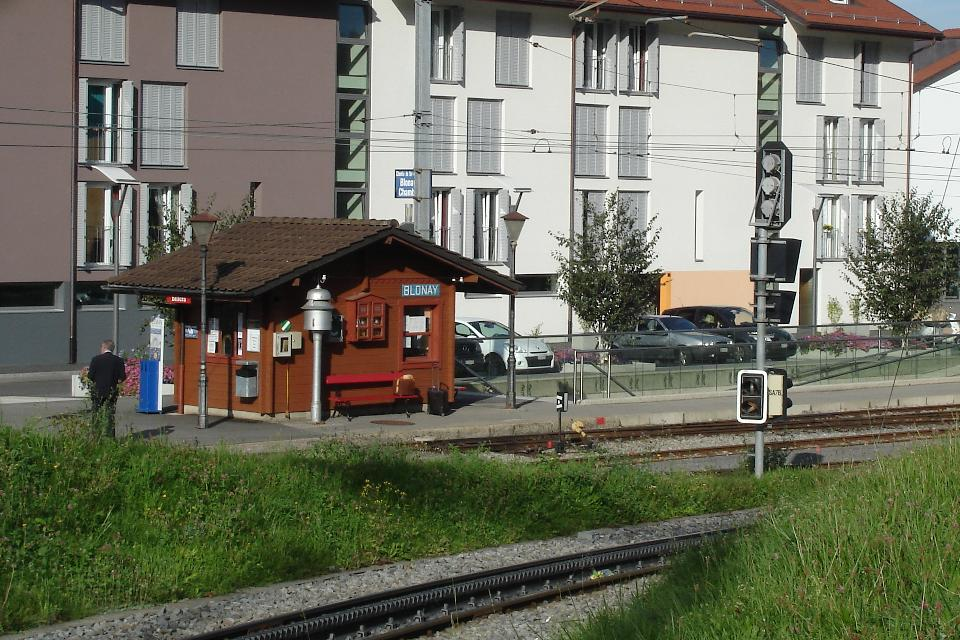
Station of the Blonay–Chamby Museum Railway with the Blonay–Chamby Museum in the background

Blonay has a population (as of December 2020) of 6,211. As of 2008, 21.1% of the population are resident foreign nationals. Over the last 10 years (1999–2009 ) the population has changed at a rate of 22.6%. It has changed at a rate of 22.6% due to migration and at a rate of 0.6% due to births and deaths.

Most of the population (as of 2000) speaks French (3,881 or 82.7%) as their first language, with German being second most common (415 or 8.8%) and English being third (185 or 3.9%). There are 66 people who speak Italian and two people who speak Romansh.

The age distribution, as of 2009, in Blonay is; 680 children or 11.9% of the population are between 0 and 9 years old and 770 teenagers or 13.5% are between 10 and 19. Of the adult population, 493 people or 8.6% of the population are between 20 and 29 years old. 663 people or 11.6% are between 30 and 39, 1,052 people or 18.4% are between 40 and 49, and 749 people or 13.1% are between 50 and 59. The senior population distribution is 657 people or 11.5% of the population are between 60 and 69 years old, 364 people or 6.4% are between 70 and 79, there are 231 people or 4.0% who are between 80 and 89, and there are 52 people or 0.9% who are 90 and older.

As of 2000, there were 1,846 people who were single and never married in the municipality. There were 2,336 married individuals, 276 widows or widowers and 237 individuals who are divorced.

As of 2000, there were 1,856 private households in the municipality, and an average of 2.4 persons per household. There were 527 households that consist of only one person and 123 households with five or more people. Out of a total of 1,907 households that answered this question, 27.6% were households made up of just one person and there were 13 adults who lived with their parents. Of the rest of the households, there are 571 married couples without children, 624 married couples with children There were 94 single parents with a child or children. There were 27 households that were made up of unrelated people and 51 households that were made up of some sort of institution or another collective housing.

In 2000, there were 1,055 single family homes (or 72.8% of the total) out of a total of 1,450 inhabited buildings. There were 250 multi-family buildings (17.2%), along with 83 multi-purpose buildings that were mostly used for housing (5.7%) and 62 other use buildings (commercial or industrial) that also had some housing (4.3%).

In 2000, a total of 1,808 apartments (78.4% of the total) were permanently occupied, while 381 apartments (16.5%) were seasonally occupied and 117 apartments (5.1%) were empty. As of 2009, the construction rate of new housing units was 11.9 new units per 1000 residents. The vacancy rate for the municipality, in 2010, was 0.29%.

The historical population is given in the following chart:

== Heritage sites of national significance ==
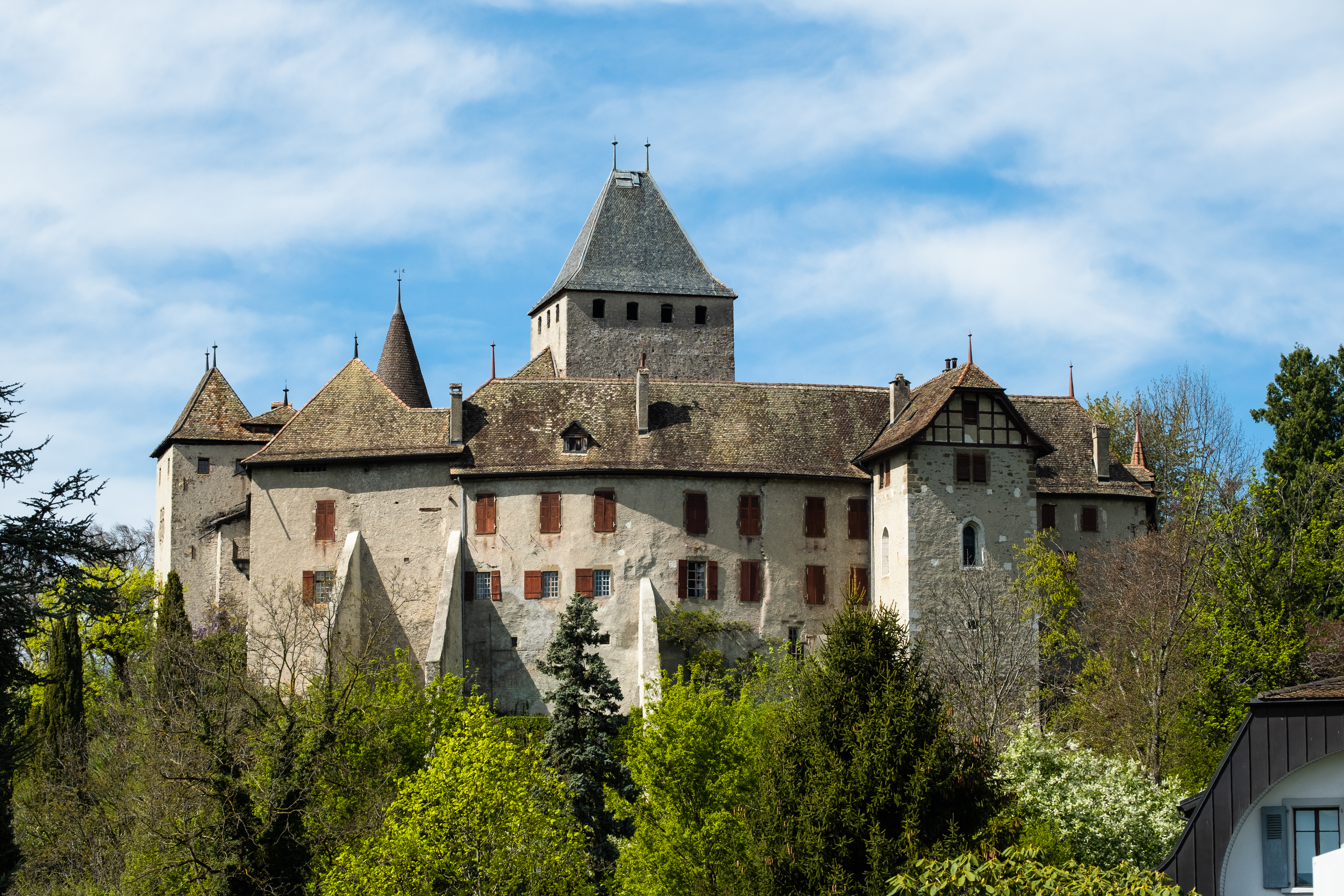
Blonay Castle

Blonay Castle is listed as a Swiss heritage site of national significance.

== Politics ==
In the 2007 federal election, the most popular party was the SVP which received 19.76% of the vote. The next three most popular parties were the SP (18.73%), the FDP (17.78%) and the Green Party (14.39%). In the federal election, a total of 1,522 votes were cast, and the voter turnout was 45.2%.

== Economy ==
As of 2010, Blonay had an unemployment rate of 3.6%. As of 2008, there were 44 people employed in the primary economic sector and about 15 businesses involved in this sector. 151 people were employed in the secondary sector and there were 29 businesses in this sector. 916 people were employed in the tertiary sector, with 146 businesses in this sector. There were 2,211 residents of the municipality who were employed in some capacity, of which females made up 43.7% of the workforce.

In 2008, the total number of full-time equivalent jobs was 912. The number of jobs in the primary sector was 33, of which 28 were in agriculture and 5 were in forestry or lumber production. The number of jobs in the secondary sector was 142 of which 14 or (9.9%) were in manufacturing and 128 (90.1%) were in construction. The number of jobs in the tertiary sector was 737. In the tertiary sector; 80 or 10.9% were in wholesale or retail sales or the repair of motor vehicles, 15 or 2.0% were in the movement and storage of goods, 58 or 7.9% were in a hotel or restaurant, 74 or 10.0% were in the information industry, 14 or 1.9% were the insurance or financial industry, 58 or 7.9% were technical professionals or scientists, 88 or 11.9% were in education and 219 or 29.7% were in health care.

In 2000, there were 556 workers who commuted into the municipality and 1,692 workers who commuted away. The municipality is a net exporter of workers, with about 3.0 workers leaving the municipality for every one entering. About 1.3% of the workforce coming into Blonay are coming from outside Switzerland. Of the working population, 11.2% used public transportation to get to work, and 70.5% used a private car.

== Religion ==
From the 2000 census, 1,494 or 31.8% were Roman Catholic, while 2,159 or 46.0% belonged to the Swiss Reformed Church. Of the rest of the population, there were 30 members of an Orthodox church (or about 0.64% of the population), there were two individuals (or about 0.04% of the population) who belonged to the Christian Catholic Church, and there were 294 individuals (or about 6.26% of the population) who belonged to another Christian church. There were eight individuals (or about 0.17% of the population) who were Jewish, and 34 (or about 0.72% of the population) who were Islamic. There were seven individuals who were Buddhist, two individuals who were Hindu and eight individuals who belonged to another church. 613 (or about 13.06% of the population) belonged to no church, are agnostic or atheist, and 174 individuals (or about 3.71% of the population) did not answer the question.

== Education ==
In Blonay, about 1,682 or (35.8%) of the population have completed non-mandatory upper secondary education, and 1,007 or (21.4%) have completed additional higher education (either university or a Fachhochschule). Of the 1,007 who completed tertiary schooling, 49.6% were Swiss men, 25.2% were Swiss women, 15.1% were non-Swiss men and 10.1% were non-Swiss women.

In the 2009/2010 school year, there were a total of 683 students in the Blonay school district. In the Vaud cantonal school system, two years of non-obligatory pre-school are provided by the political districts. During the school year, the political district provided pre-school care for a total of 817 children of which 456 children (55.8%) received subsidized pre-school care. The canton's primary school program requires students to attend for four years. There were 374 students in the municipal primary school program. The obligatory lower secondary school program lasts for six years and there were 308 students in those schools. There was also one student who was home schooled or attended another non-traditional school.

As of 2000, there were 107 students in Blonay who came from another municipality, while 389 residents attended schools outside the municipality.
