= Corsier-sur-Vevey =

- Municipality
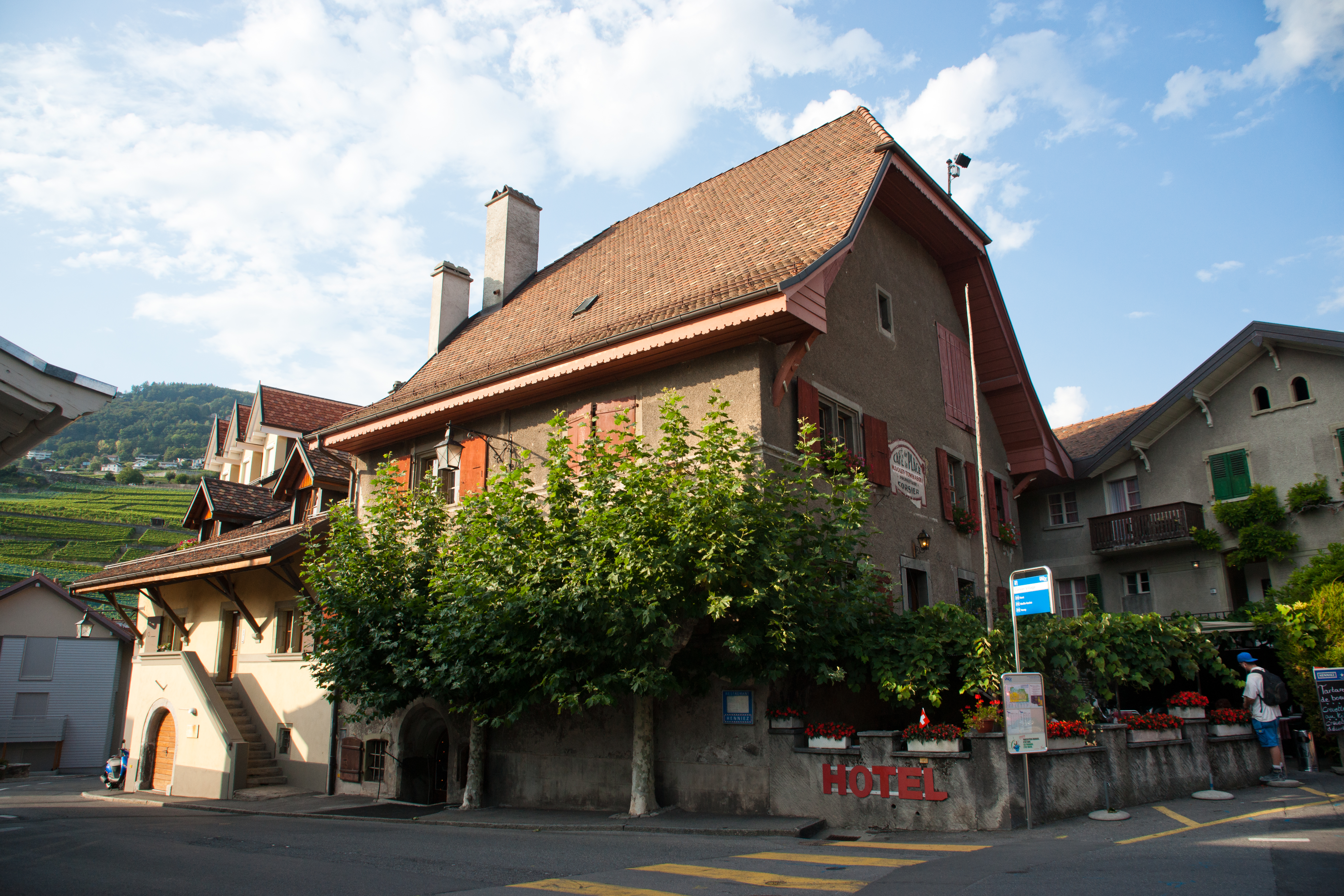
- Corsier center

- Flag Coat of arms
- Location of Corsier-sur-Vevey
- Location within Switzerland Location within Canton of Vaud
- Coordinates: 46°28′N 6°51′E
- Country: Switzerland
- Canton: Vaud
- District: Riviera-Pays-d'Enhaut

Government
  - Mayor: Syndic

Area
  - Total: 6.8 km^{2} (2.6 sq mi)
- Elevation: 421 m (1,381 ft)

Population (December 2024)
  - Total: 3,385
  - Density: 500/km^{2} (1,300/sq mi)
- Demonym: Corsiérans
- Time zone: UTC+01:00 (CET)
  - Summer (DST): UTC+02:00 (CEST)
- Postal code: 1804
- SFOS number: 5884
- ISO 3166 code: CH-VD
- Localities: Fenil-sur-Corsier, Les Monts-de-Corsier
- Surrounded by: Attalens (FR), Chardonne, Châtel-Saint-Denis (FR), Corseaux, Jongny, Remaufens (FR), Saint-Légier-La Chiésaz, Vevey
- Website: www.corsier-sur-vevey.ch

Corsier-sur-Vevey is a municipality in the district of Riviera-Pays-d'Enhaut in the canton of Vaud in Switzerland.

== History ==
Corsier-sur-Vevey is first mentioned in 1079 as Corise. Until 1953 it was known as Corsier.

== Geography ==
Corsier-sur-Vevey has an area, as of 2013, of 6.74 square kilometers (2.60 mi^{2}). Of this area, 2.97 km^{2} (1.15 mi^{2}) or 44.1% is used for agricultural purposes, while 2.32 km^{2} (0.90 mi^{2}) or 34.4% is forested. Of the rest of the land, 1.4 km^{2} (0.54 mi^{2}) or 20.8% is settled (buildings or roads), 0.02 km^{2} (4.9 acres) or 0.3% is either rivers or lakes and 0.02 km^{2} (4.9 acres) or 0.3% is unproductive land.

Of the built up area, industrial buildings made up 1.6% of the total area while housing and buildings made up 11.9% and transportation infrastructure made up 6.4%. Out of the forested land, 27.0% of the total land area is heavily forested and 7.4% is covered with orchards or small clusters of trees. Of the agricultural land, 5.6% is used for growing crops and 33.4% is pastures, while 5.0% is used for orchards or vine crops. All the water in the municipality is flowing water.

The municipality was part of the Vevey District until it was dissolved on 31 August 2006, and Corsier-sur-Vevey became part of the new district of Riviera-Pays-d'Enhaut.

The municipality is located on the right side of the Veveyse. It consists of the village of Corsier-sur-Vevey and the hamlet of Les Monts-de-Corsier.

== Coat of arms ==
The blazon of the municipal coat of arms is Argent, a Heart Gules above two shaking Hands proper clothed Azure; chief Azure three Mullets (of five) Argent.

== Demographics ==
Corsier-sur-Vevey has a population (as of December 2020) of 3,419. As of 2008, 30.1% of the population are resident foreign nationals. Over the last 10 years (1999–2009) the population has changed at a rate of 2.3%; it has changed at a rate of -0.5% due to migration and at a rate of 4.2% due to births and deaths.

Most of the population (as of 2000) speaks French (2,535 or 79.2%) as their first language, with German being second most common (176 or 5.5%) and Portuguese being third (117 or 3.7%). There are 110 people who speak Italian and four people who speak Romansh.

The age distribution, as of 2009, in Corsier-sur-Vevey is; 309 children or 9.7% of the population are between 0 and 9 years old and 348 teenagers or 10.9% are between 10 and 19. Of the adult population, 368 people or 11.5% of the population are between 20 and 29 years old. 421 people or 13.2% are between 30 and 39, 491 people or 15.4% are between 40 and 49, and 417 people or 13.0% are between 50 and 59. The senior population distribution is 401 people or 12.5% of the population are between 60 and 69 years old, 289 people or 9.0% are between 70 and 79, there are 135 people or 4.2% who are between 80 and 89, and there are 18 people or 0.6% who are 90 and older.

As of 2000, there were 1,238 people who were single and never married in the municipality. There were 1,555 married individuals, 182 widows or widowers and 225 individuals who are divorced.

As of 2000, there were 1,475 private households in the municipality, and an average of 2.1 persons per household. There were 560 households that consist of only one person and 64 households with five or more people. Out of a total of 1,489 households that answered this question, 37.6% were households made up of just one person and there were five adults who lived with their parents. Of the rest of the households, there are 421 married couples without children, 379 married couples with children There were 89 single parents with a child or children. There were 21 households that were made up of unrelated people and 14 households that were made up of some sort of institution or another collective housing.

In 2000 there were 252 single family homes (or 50.8% of the total) out of a total of 496 inhabited buildings. There were 174 multi-family buildings (35.1%), along with 39 multi-purpose buildings that were mostly used for housing (7.9%) and 31 other use buildings (commercial or industrial) that also had some housing (6.3%).

In 2000, a total of 1,437 apartments (84.8% of the total) were permanently occupied, while 211 apartments (12.4%) were seasonally occupied and 47 apartments (2.8%) were empty. As of 2009, the construction rate of new housing units was 3.4 new units per 1,000 residents. The vacancy rate for the municipality, in 2010, was 0.34%.

The historical population is given in the following chart:

== Heritage sites of national significance ==
The Café De La Place, and the Manoir de Ban with the main house, outbuildings and park and the Corsier-sur-Vevey portion of the UNESCO World Heritage Site: Lavaux, Vineyard Terraces are listed as Swiss heritage site of national significance.

== Famous residents ==
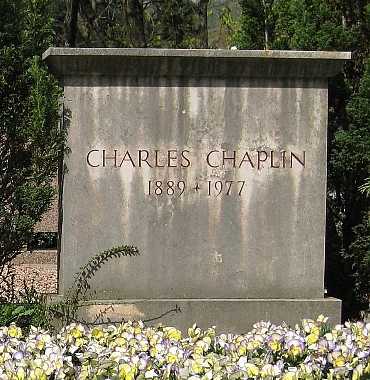
Charlie Chaplin's grave in Corsier-sur-Vevey

Charlie Chaplin lived in Corsier-sur-Vevey from 1953 until his death in 1977 and is buried in the communal cemetery.

James Mason is also buried in the cemetery of Corsier-sur-Vevey.

It is also the birthplace of the architect Eugène Jost.

Adeena Mey grew up in Corsier-sur-Vevey.

== Politics ==
In the 2019 federal election the most popular party was the Green Party which received 18.41% of the vote. The next three most popular parties were the SP (17.23%), the FDP (16.19%) and the SVP (15.67%). In the federal election, a total of 802 votes were cast, and the voter turnout was 41.9%.

== Economy ==
As of 2010, Corsier-sur-Vevey had an unemployment rate of 4.3%. As of 2008, there were 35 people employed in the primary economic sector and about 14 businesses involved in this sector. Six hundred and seventy-nine people were employed in the secondary sector and there were 38 businesses in this sector. Five hundred and fifty-six people were employed in the tertiary sector, with 63 businesses in this sector. There were 1,563 residents of the municipality who were employed in some capacity, of which females made up 45.8% of the workforce.

In 2008 the total number of full-time equivalent jobs was 1,113. The number of jobs in the primary sector was 26, of which 25 were in agriculture and one was in forestry or lumber production. The number of jobs in the secondary sector was 652 of which 531 or (81.4%) were in manufacturing and 120 (18.4%) were in construction. The number of jobs in the tertiary sector was 435. In the tertiary sector; 58 or 13.3% were in wholesale or retail sales or the repair of motor vehicles, 30 or 6.9% were in the movement and storage of goods, 21 or 4.8% were in a hotel or restaurant, 2 or 0.5% were in the information industry, 20 or 4.6% were the insurance or financial industry, 47 or 10.8% were technical professionals or scientists, 73 or 16.8% were in education and 150 or 34.5% were in health care.

In 2000, there were 692 workers who commuted into the municipality and 1,315 workers who commuted away. The municipality is a net exporter of workers, with about 1.9 workers leaving the municipality for every one entering. About 2.3% of the workforce coming into Corsier-sur-Vevey are coming from outside Switzerland, while 0.0% of the locals commute out of Switzerland for work. Of the working population, 20.5% used public transportation to get to work, and 55.9% used a private car.

== Religion ==
From the 2000 census, 1,260 or 39.4% were Roman Catholic, while 1,222 or 38.2% belonged to the Swiss Reformed Church. Of the rest of the population, there were 79 members of an Orthodox church (or about 2.47% of the population), there was one individual who belongs to the Christian Catholic Church, and there were 135 individuals (or about 4.22% of the population) who belonged to another Christian church. There was one individual who was Jewish, and 105 (or about 3.28% of the population) who were Islamic. There were 14 individuals who were Buddhist, six individuals who were Hindu and four individuals who belonged to another church. Three hundred and ninety-six (or about 12.38% of the population) belonged to no church, are agnostic or atheist, and 39 individuals (or about 1.22% of the population) did not answer the question.

== Education ==
In Corsier-sur-Vevey about 1,212 or (37.9%) of the population have completed non-mandatory upper secondary education, and 404 or (12.6%) have completed additional higher education (either university or a Fachhochschule). Of the 404 who completed tertiary schooling, 46.8% were Swiss men, 27.0% were Swiss women, 18.1% were non-Swiss men and 8.2% were non-Swiss women.

In the 2009/2010 school year there were a total of 331 pupils in the Corsier-sur-Vevey school district. In the Vaud cantonal school system, two years of non-obligatory pre-school are provided by the political districts. During the school year, the political district provided pre-school care for a total of 817 children of whom 456 children (55.8%) received subsidised pre-school care. The canton's primary school programme requires pupils to attend for four years. There were 156 pupils in the municipal primary school programme. The obligatory lower secondary school programme lasts for six years and there were 170 pupils in those schools. There were also five pupils who were home schooled or attended another non-traditional school.

As of 2000, there were 222 pupils in Corsier-sur-Vevey who came from another municipality, while 186 residents attended schools outside the municipality.

The International School of Monts-de-Corsier was previously in Les Monts-de-Corsier and was a part of the Montreux-based Riviera School network.

== Sports ==
It hosts the headquarters of the International Federation of Associated Wrestling Styles, the international governing body for amateur wrestling.
