= Corseaux =

- Municipality
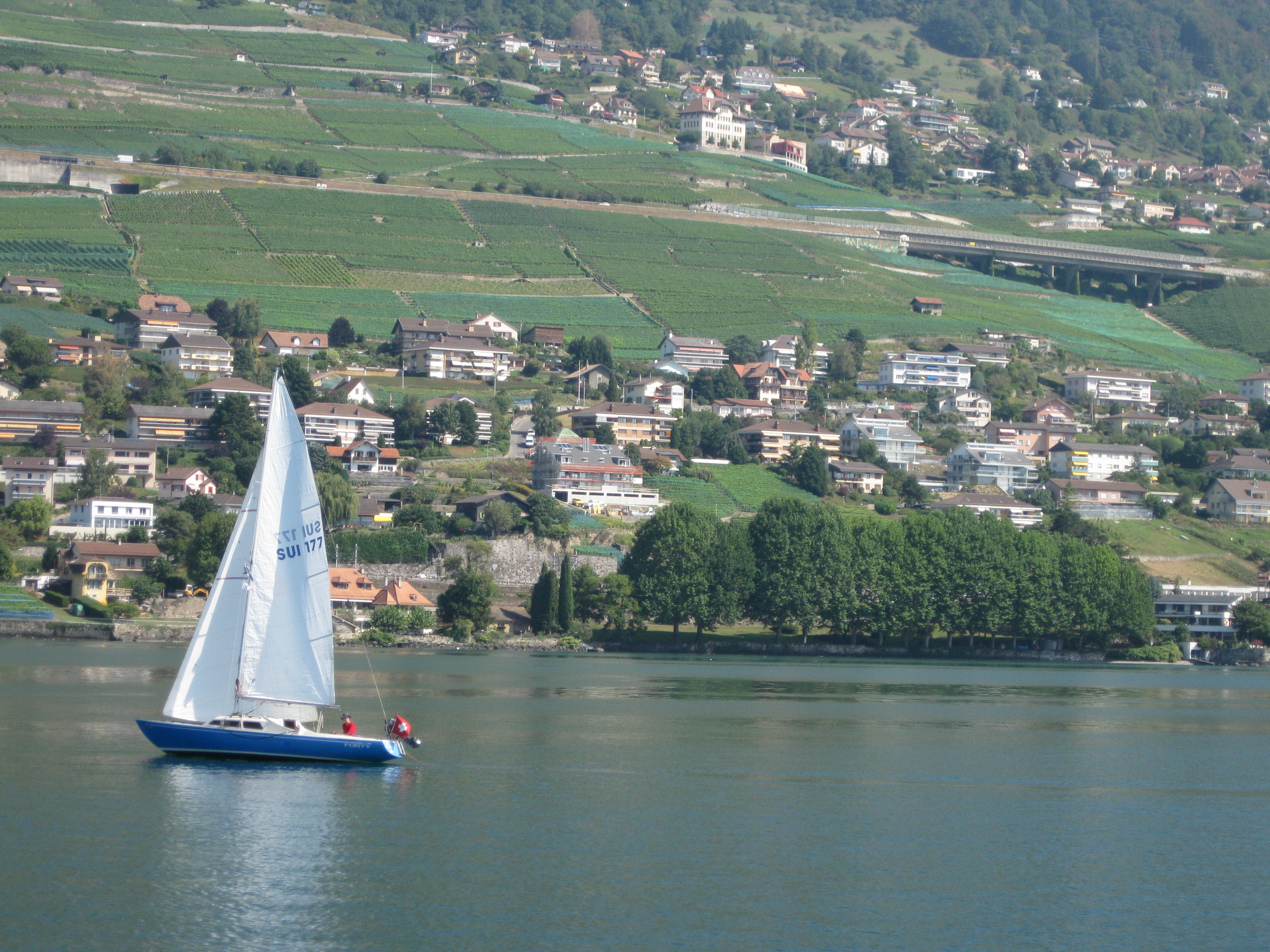
- Corseaux on Lake Geneva

- Flag Coat of arms
- Location of Corseaux
- Location within Switzerland Location within Canton of Vaud
- Coordinates: 46°28′N 06°50′E
- Country: Switzerland
- Canton: Vaud
- District: Riviera-Pays-d'Enhaut

Government
  - Mayor: Syndic; Gaston Barman

Area
  - Total: 1.06 km^{2} (0.41 sq mi)
- Elevation: 445 m (1,460 ft)

Population (2004)
  - Total: 2,091
  - Density: 1,970/km^{2} (5,110/sq mi)
- Demonym(s): Les Corsalins; Lè Corsacu
- Time zone: UTC+01:00 (CET)
  - Summer (DST): UTC+02:00 (CEST)
- Postal code: 1802
- SFOS number: 5883
- ISO 3166 code: CH-VD
- Surrounded by: Chardonne, Corsier-sur-Vevey, Vevey
- Website: www.corseaux.ch

Corseaux (French pronunciation: [kɔʁso]) is a municipality in the Riviera-Pays-d'Enhaut district in the canton of Vaud in Switzerland.

== History ==
Corseaux was first mentioned in 1179 as de Corsal.

== Geography ==
Aerial view (1960)

Corseaux has an area, as of 2009, of 1.1 square kilometers (0.42 mi^{2}). Of this area, 0.23 km^{2} (0.089 mi^{2}) or 21.7% is used for agricultural purposes, while 0 km^{2} (0 mi^{2}) or 0.0% is forested. Of the rest of the land, 0.83 km^{2} (0.32 mi^{2}) or 78.3% is settled (buildings or roads).

Of the built up area, housing and buildings made up 51.9% and transportation infrastructure made up 22.6%. while parks, green belts and sports fields made up 1.9%. Out of the forested land, all of the forested land area is covered with heavy forests. Of the agricultural land, 0.0% is used for growing crops, while 20.8% is used for orchards or vine crops.

The municipality was part of the Vevey District until it was dissolved on 31 August 2006, and Corseaux became part of the new district of Riviera-Pays-d'Enhaut.

The municipality is located on Lake Geneva in the foothills of Mont-Pèlerin.

== Demographics ==
Corseaux has a population (as of December 2020) of 2,315. As of 2008, 22.6% of the population are resident foreign nationals. Over the last 10 years (1999–2009) the population has changed at a rate of -0.2%. It has changed at a rate of 4.9% due to migration and at a rate of -5.1% due to births and deaths.

Most of the population (as of 2000) speaks French (1,756 or 84.5%) as their first language, with German being second most common (154 or 7.4%) and English being third (56 or 2.7%). There are 37 people who speak Italian.

The age distribution, as of 2009, in Corseaux is; 189 children or 9.1% of the population are between 0 and 9 years old and 216 teenagers or 10.3% are between 10 and 19. Of the adult population, 192 people or 9.2% of the population are between 20 and 29 years old. 230 people or 11.0% are between 30 and 39, 317 people or 15.2% are between 40 and 49, and 292 people or 14.0% are between 50 and 59. The senior population distribution is 302 people or 14.5% of the population are between 60 and 69 years old, 193 people or 9.2% are between 70 and 79, there are 129 people or 6.2% who are between 80 and 89, and there are 28 people or 1.3% who are 90 and older.

As of 2000, there were 714 people who were single and never married in the municipality. There were 1,077 married individuals, 151 widows or widowers and 137 individuals who are divorced.

As of 2000, there were 925 private households in the municipality, and an average of 2.2 persons per household. There were 308 households that consist of only one person and 36 households with five or more people. Out of a total of 930 households that answered this question, 33.1% were households made up of just one person and there were 4 adults who lived with their parents. Of the rest of the households, there are 317 married couples without children, 244 married couples with children There were 40 single parents with a child or children. There were 12 households that were made up of unrelated people and 5 households that were made up of some sort of institution or another collective housing.

In 2000 there were 202 single family homes (or 45.4% of the total) out of a total of 445 inhabited buildings. There were 192 multi-family buildings (43.1%), along with 37 multi-purpose buildings that were mostly used for housing (8.3%) and 14 other use buildings (commercial or industrial) that also had some housing (3.1%).

In 2000, a total of 911 apartments (88.9% of the total) were permanently occupied, while 82 apartments (8.0%) were seasonally occupied and 32 apartments (3.1%) were empty. As of 2009, the construction rate of new housing units was 6.2 new units per 1000 residents. The vacancy rate for the municipality, in 2010, was 0.72%.

The historical population is given in the following chart:

== Heritage sites of national significance ==
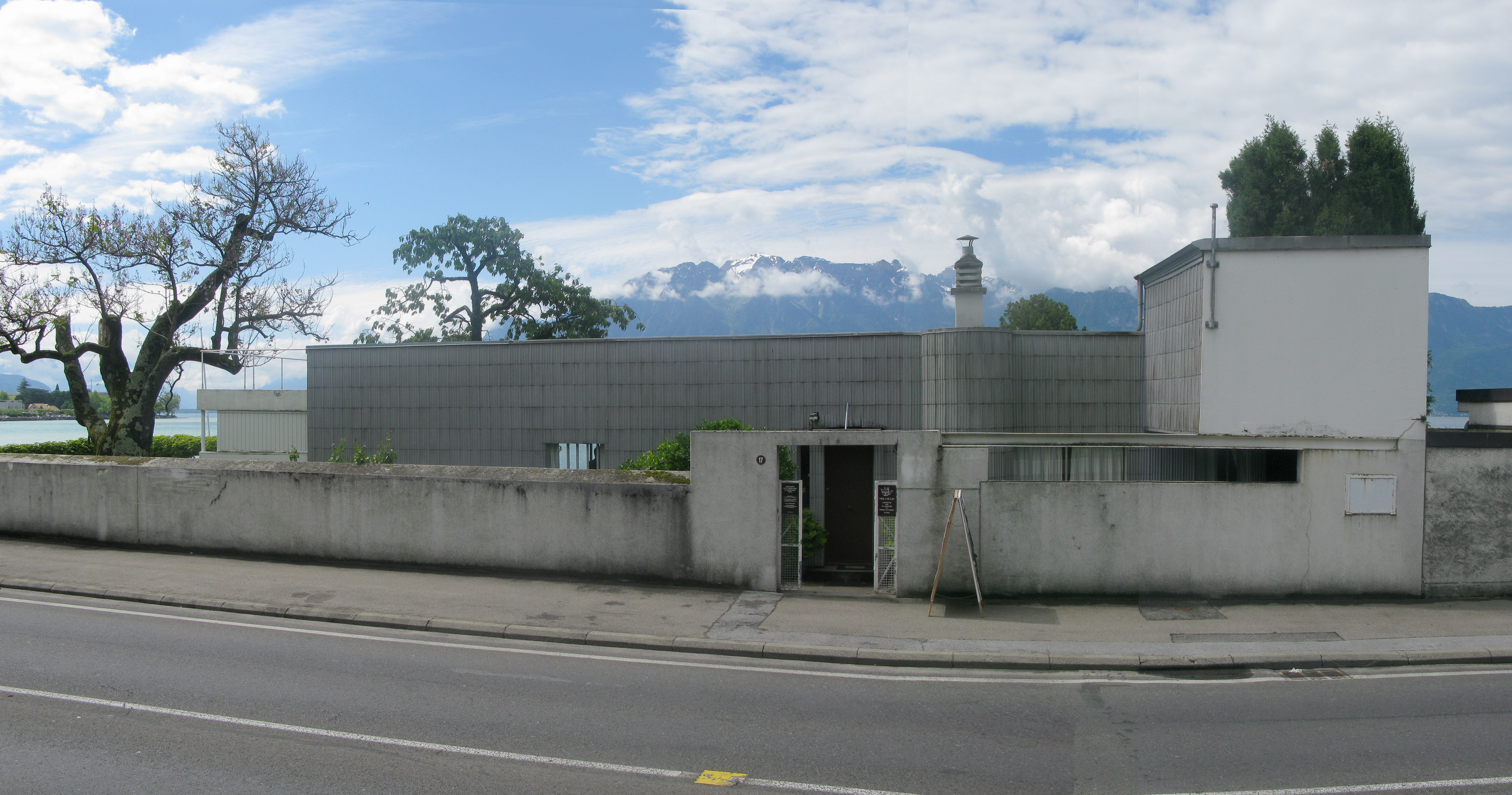
Villa Le Lac from the front

Portions of two UNESCO World Heritage Sites are found in Corseaux. The newest is Le Corbusier's Villa Le Lac which is part of The Architectural Work of Le Corbusier, an Outstanding Contribution to the Modern Movement. The second are the vineyards near the village which are part of the Lavaux Vineyard Terraces. Both sites are also listed as a Swiss heritage site of national significance.

== Politics and heraldry ==
In the 2007 federal election the most popular party was the FDP which received 20.31% of the vote. The next three most popular parties were the SVP (19.51%), the SP (14.36%) and the LPS Party (13.75%). In the federal election, a total of 689 votes were cast, and the voter turnout was 51.3%.

The blazon of the municipal coat of arms is Azure, a Heart Gules above two Mullets (of five) Or above a Crescent of the last.

== Economy ==
As of 2010, Corseaux had an unemployment rate of 3.3%. As of 2008, there were 48 people employed in the primary economic sector and about 5 businesses involved in this sector. 72 people were employed in the secondary sector and there were 13 businesses in this sector. 285 people were employed in the tertiary sector, with 58 businesses in this sector. There were 927 residents of the municipality who were employed in some capacity, of which females made up 41.1% of the workforce.

In 2008 the total number of full-time equivalent jobs was 347. The number of jobs in the primary sector was 24, all of which were in agriculture. The number of jobs in the secondary sector was 67 of which 42 or (62.7%) were in manufacturing and 25 (37.3%) were in construction. The number of jobs in the tertiary sector was 256. In the tertiary sector; 82 or 32.0% were in wholesale or retail sales or the repair of motor vehicles, 3 or 1.2% were in the movement and storage of goods, 22 or 8.6% were in a hotel or restaurant, 23 or 9.0% were in the information industry, 1 was the insurance or financial industry, 28 or 10.9% were technical professionals or scientists, 1 was in education and 55 or 21.5% were in health care.

In 2000, there were 275 workers who commuted into the municipality and 776 workers who commuted away. The municipality is a net exporter of workers, with about 2.8 workers leaving the municipality for every one entering. Of the working population, 16.4% used public transportation to get to work, and 66.3% used a private car.

== Religion ==
From the 2000 census, 680 or 32.7% were Roman Catholic, while 999 or 48.1% belonged to the Swiss Reformed Church. Of the rest of the population, there were 18 members of an Orthodox church (or about 0.87% of the population), there were 3 individuals (or about 0.14% of the population) who belonged to the Christian Catholic Church, and there were 108 individuals (or about 5.19% of the population) who belonged to another Christian church. There were 5 individuals (or about 0.24% of the population) who were Jewish, and 23 (or about 1.11% of the population) who were Islamic. There were 2 individuals who were Buddhist and 2 individuals who belonged to another church. 268 (or about 12.89% of the population) belonged to no church, are agnostic or atheist, and 18 individuals (or about 0.87% of the population) did not answer the question.

== Education ==
In Corseaux about 823 or (39.6%) of the population have completed non-mandatory upper secondary education, and 495 or (23.8%) have completed additional higher education (either university or a Fachhochschule). Of the 495 who completed tertiary schooling, 55.6% were Swiss men, 26.5% were Swiss women, 11.7% were non-Swiss men and 6.3% were non-Swiss women.

In the 2009/2010 school year there were a total of 168 students in the Corseaux school district. In the Vaud cantonal school system, two years of non-obligatory pre-school are provided by the political districts. During the school year, the political district provided pre-school care for a total of 817 children of which 456 children (55.8%) received subsidized pre-school care. The canton's primary school program requires students to attend for four years. There were 93 students in the municipal primary school program. The obligatory lower secondary school program lasts for six years and there were 74 students in those schools. There was also 1 student who was home schooled or attended another non-traditional school.

As of 2000, there were 76 students in Corseaux who came from another municipality, while 185 residents attended schools outside the municipality.
