= Riviera-Pays-d'Enhaut District =

Coordinates: 46.4656°N 6.8489°E

Riviera-Pays-d'Enhaut District District de la Riviera-Pays-d'Enhaut
- District
- Country: Switzerland
- Canton: Vaud
- Capital: Vevey
- Largest city: Montreux

Area
  - Total: 282.88 km^{2} (109.22 sq mi)

Population (2020)
  - Total: 85,976
  - Density: 303.93/km^{2} (787.18/sq mi)
- Time zone: UTC+1 (CET)
  - Summer (DST): UTC+2 (CEST)
- Municipalities: 12

Riviera-Pays-d'Enhaut District is a district in the Swiss canton of Vaud.

== Geography ==
Riviera-Pays-d'Enhaut has an area, as of 2009, of 282.9 square kilometers (109.2 sq mi). Of this area, 112.91 km^{2} (43.59 sq mi) or 39.9% is used for agricultural purposes, while 112.05 km^{2} (43.26 sq mi) or 39.6% is forested. Of the rest of the land, 26.41 km^{2} (10.20 sq mi) or 9.3% is settled (buildings or roads) and 31.45 km^{2} (12.14 sq mi) or 11.1% is unproductive land.

== Demographics ==
Riviera-Pays-d'Enhaut has a population (as of December 2020) of 85,976.

In 2008 there were 484 live births to Swiss citizens and 297 births to non-Swiss citizens, and in same time span there were 654 deaths of Swiss citizens and 95 non-Swiss citizen deaths. Ignoring immigration and emigration, the population of Swiss citizens decreased by 170 while the foreign population increased by 202. There were 13 Swiss men and 48 Swiss women who immigrated back to Switzerland. At the same time, there were 1,336 non-Swiss men and 1,521 non-Swiss women who immigrated from another country to Switzerland. The total Swiss population change in 2008 (from all sources, including moves across municipal borders) was an increase of 341 and the non-Swiss population increased by 1,368 people. This represents a population growth rate of 2.2%.

The age distribution, as of 2009, in Riviera-Pays-d'Enhaut is; 7,812 children or 9.9% of the population are between 0 and 9 years old and 9,268 teenagers or 11.7% are between 10 and 19. Of the adult population, 10,286 people or 13.0% of the population are between 20 and 29 years old. 10,452 people or 13.2% are between 30 and 39, 12,450 people or 15.8% are between 40 and 49, and 9,856 people or 12.5% are between 50 and 59. The senior population distribution is 8,491 people or 10.8% of the population are between 60 and 69 years old, 5,880 people or 7.4% are between 70 and 79, there are 3,707 people or 4.7% who are 80 and 89, and there are 745 people or 0.9% who are 90 and older.

== Mergers and name changes ==
On 1 September 2006, the former Pays-d'Enhaut district (District du Pays-d'Enhaut) and Vevey district (District de Vevey) were dissolved and merged into the new Riviera-Pays-d'Enhaut district.

- The municipalities of Château-d'Œx, Rossinière and Rougemont came from the Pays-d'Enhaut district (District du Pays-d'Enhaut).
- The municipalities of Blonay, Chardonne, Corseaux, Corsier-sur-Vevey, Jongny, Montreux, Saint-Légier-La Chiésaz, La Tour-de-Peilz, Vevey and Veytaux came from the Vevey district (District de Vevey).
- On 1 January 2022 the former municipalities of Blonay and Saint-Légier-La Chiésaz merged into the new municipality of Blonay - Saint-Légier.

== Politics ==
In the 2007 federal election the most popular party was the SP which received 21.78% of the vote. The next three most popular parties were the SVP (20.79%), the FDP (15.28%) and the Green Party (14.28%). In the federal election, a total of 17,788 votes were cast, and the voter turnout was 43.1%.

== Education ==
In the 2009/2010 school year there were a total of 8,052 students in the local and district school systems. In the Vaud cantonal school system, two years of non-obligatory pre-school are provided by the political districts. During the school year, the district provided pre-school care for a total of 817 children. There were 456 (55.8%) children who received subsidized pre-school care. There were 4,183 students in the primary school program, which last four years. The obligatory lower secondary school program lasts for six years and there were 3,611 students in those schools. There were also 258 students who were home schooled or attended another non-traditional school.

== Municipalities ==
The following municipalities are located within the district:

Municipality	Population (31 December 2020)	Area km^{2}
Blonay – Saint-Légier		31.24
Chardonne	3,092	10.32
Château-d'Œx	3,487	113.71
Corseaux	2,315	1.06
Corsier-sur-Vevey	3,419	6.75
Jongny	1,671	2.16
La Tour-de-Peilz	12,068	3.24
Montreux	26,090	33.37
Rossinière	534	23.36
Rougemont	864	48.53
Vevey	19,752	2.38
Veytaux	952	6.76
Total	85,976	282.9
