= Vevey District =

Coordinates: 46°28′N 6°51′E

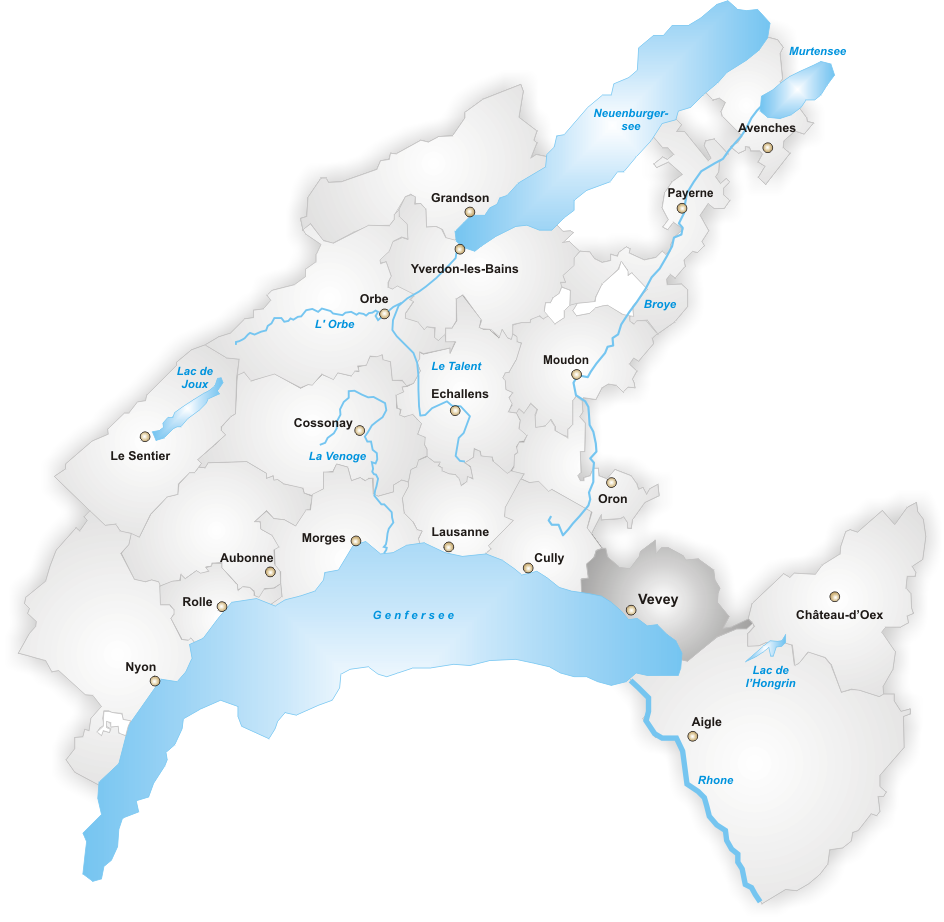
Vevey District until 2007.

Vevey District was a district in the canton of Vaud in Switzerland. The seat of the district was the city of Vevey. It has been dissolved on 1 January 2008 and merged into the new Riviera-Pays-d'Enhaut district.

== Mergers and name changes ==
- On 1 January 1962 the former municipalities of Montreux-Châtelard and Montreux-Planches merged to form the new municipality of Montreux.
- On 1 September 2006 the municipalities of Blonay, Chardonne, Corseaux, Corsier-sur-Vevey, Jongny, Montreux, Saint-Légier-La Chiésaz, La Tour-de-Peilz, Vevey and Veytaux came from the District de Vevey to join the Riviera-Pays-d'Enhaut District.

== Municipalities ==
The following municipalities were located in the district at its dissolution:

- Blonay
- Chardonne
- Corseaux
- Corsier-sur-Vevey
- Jongny
- La Tour-de-Peilz
- Montreux
- Saint-Légier-La Chiésaz
- Vevey
- Veytaux
