= Veytaux =

- Municipality
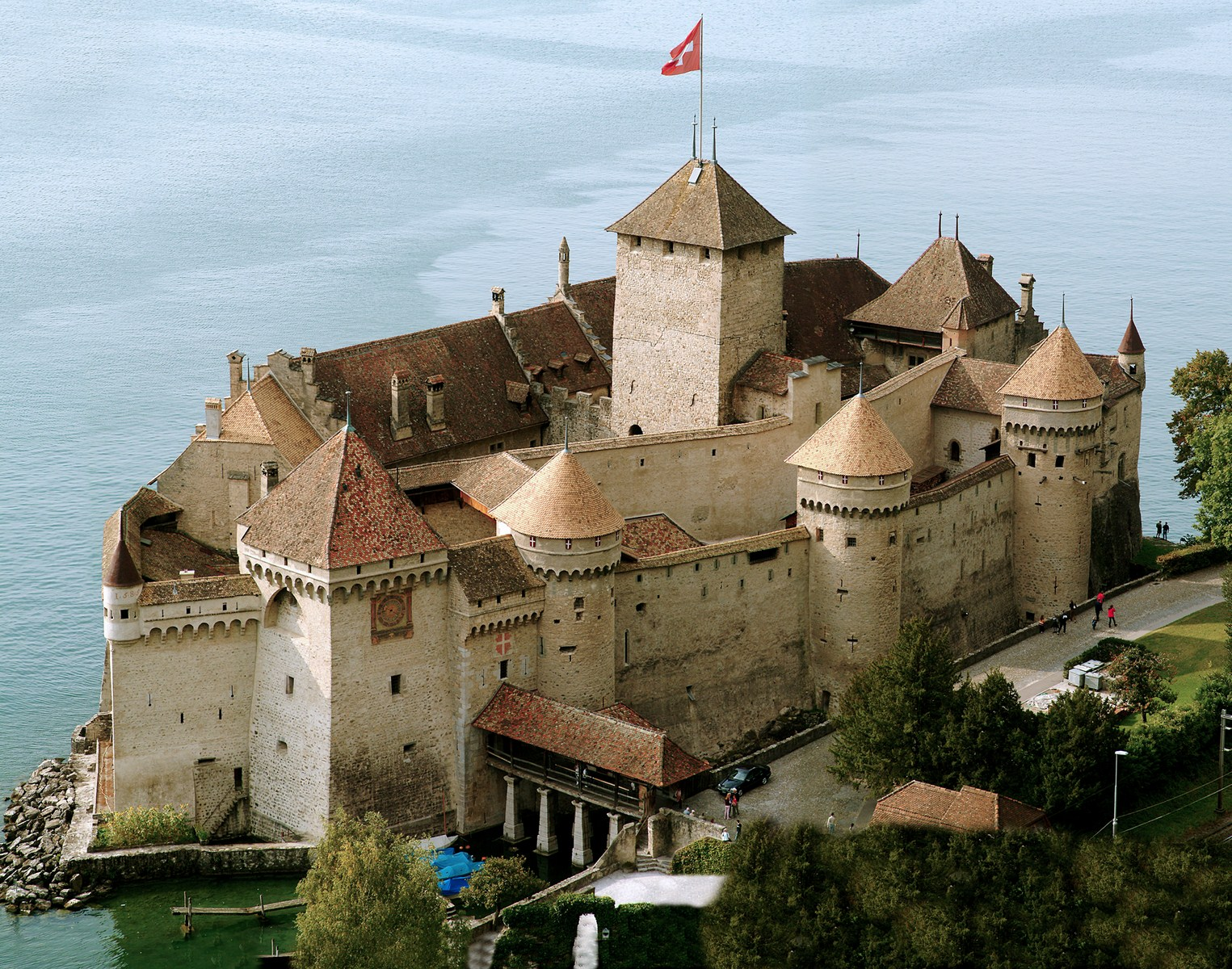
- Chillon Castle in Veytaux municipality

- Flag Coat of arms
- Location of Veytaux
- Location within Switzerland Location within Canton of Vaud
- Coordinates: 46°25′17″N 06°55′39″E
- Country: Switzerland
- Canton: Vaud
- District: Riviera-Pays-d'Enhaut

Government
  - Mayor: Syndic; Christine Chevalley

Area
  - Total: 6.73 km^{2} (2.60 sq mi)
- Elevation: 438 m (1,437 ft)

Population (2003)
  - Total: 809
  - Density: 120/km^{2} (311/sq mi)
- Time zone: UTC+01:00 (CET)
  - Summer (DST): UTC+02:00 (CEST)
- Postal code: 1820
- SFOS number: 5891
- ISO 3166 code: CH-VD
- Surrounded by: Haut-Intyamon (FR), La Tour-de-Peilz, Montreux, Noville, Rossinière, Villeneuve
- Website: https://www.veytaux.ch Profile (in French), SFSO statistics

Veytaux (French pronunciation: [veto]) is a municipality in the Riviera-Pays-d'Enhaut district in the canton of Vaud in Switzerland.

The Château de Chillon across the Avenue de Chillon on Lake Geneva provides a view of the entire lake looking westward.

== History ==
Veytaux is first mentioned in 1332 as Veytour.

== Geography ==
Aerial view (1948)

Veytaux has an area, as of 2009, of 6.8 square kilometers (2.6 mi^{2}). Of this area, 0.98 km^{2} (0.38 mi^{2}) or 14.5% is used for agricultural purposes, while 5 km^{2} (1.9 mi^{2}) or 74.0% is forested. Of the rest of the land, 0.36 km^{2} (0.14 mi^{2}) or 5.3% is settled (buildings or roads) and 0.38 km^{2} (0.15 mi^{2}) or 5.6% is unproductive land.

Of the built up area, housing and buildings made up 2.2% and transportation infrastructure made up 2.2%. Out of the forested land, 70.9% of the total land area is heavily forested and 1.9% is covered with orchards or small clusters of trees. Of the agricultural land, 0.0% is used for growing crops and 13.9% is used for alpine pastures. Of the unproductive areas, 3.1% is unproductive vegetation and 2.5% is too rocky for vegetation.

The municipality was part of the Vevey District until it was dissolved on 31 August 2006, and Veytaux became part of the new district of Riviera-Pays-d'Enhaut.

It consists of the village of Veytaux and the hamlet of Grandchamp.

== Coat of arms ==
The blazon of the municipal coat of arms is Argent, between two Palls wavy Azure a Tower surmounted by a Chamois salient all Sable; Base Azure.

== Demographics ==
Veytaux has a population (as of December 2020) of 952. As of 2008, 26.9% of the population are resident foreign nationals. Over the last 10 years (1999–2009) the population has changed at a rate of -3.1%. It has changed at a rate of 0% due to migration and at a rate of -0.6% due to births and deaths.

Most of the population (as of 2000) speaks French (701 or 82.4%) as their first language, with German being second most common (62 or 7.3%) and English being third (25 or 2.9%). There are 18 people who speak Italian.

The age distribution, as of 2009, in Veytaux is; 70 children or 8.5% of the population are between 0 and 9 years old and 64 teenagers or 7.8% are between 10 and 19. Of the adult population, 108 people or 13.1% of the population are between 20 and 29 years old. 101 people or 12.3% are between 30 and 39, 142 people or 17.3% are between 40 and 49, and 129 people or 15.7% are between 50 and 59. The senior population distribution is 93 people or 11.3% of the population are between 60 and 69 years old, 76 people or 9.2% are between 70 and 79, there are 34 people or 4.1% who are between 80 and 89, and there are 6 people or 0.7% who are 90 and older.

As of 2000, there were 330 people who were single and never married in the municipality. There were 389 married individuals, 57 widows or widowers and 75 individuals who are divorced.

As of 2000, there were 423 private households in the municipality, and an average of 1.9 persons per household. There were 192 households that consist of only one person and 12 households with five or more people. Out of a total of 436 households that answered this question, 44.0% were households made up of just one person and there was 1 adult who lived with their parents. Of the rest of the households, there are 118 married couples without children, 84 married couples with children There were 21 single parents with a child or children. There were 7 households that were made up of unrelated people and 13 households that were made up of some sort of institution or another collective housing.

In 2000 there were 83 single family homes (or 44.9% of the total) out of a total of 185 inhabited buildings. There were 72 multi-family buildings (38.9%), along with 23 multi-purpose buildings that were mostly used for housing (12.4%) and 7 other use buildings (commercial or industrial) that also had some housing (3.8%).

In 2000, a total of 408 apartments (82.3% of the total) were permanently occupied, while 62 apartments (12.5%) were seasonally occupied and 26 apartments (5.2%) were empty. As of 2009, the construction rate of new housing units was 1.2 new units per 1000 residents. The vacancy rate for the municipality, in 2010, was 0%.

The historical population is given in the following chart:

== Heritage sites of national significance ==
Chillon Castle and the Chillon Viaduct on highway N9 are listed as Swiss heritage site of national significance. The entire urban village of Territet/Veytaux and the region around Chillon Castle are part of the Inventory of Swiss Heritage Sites.

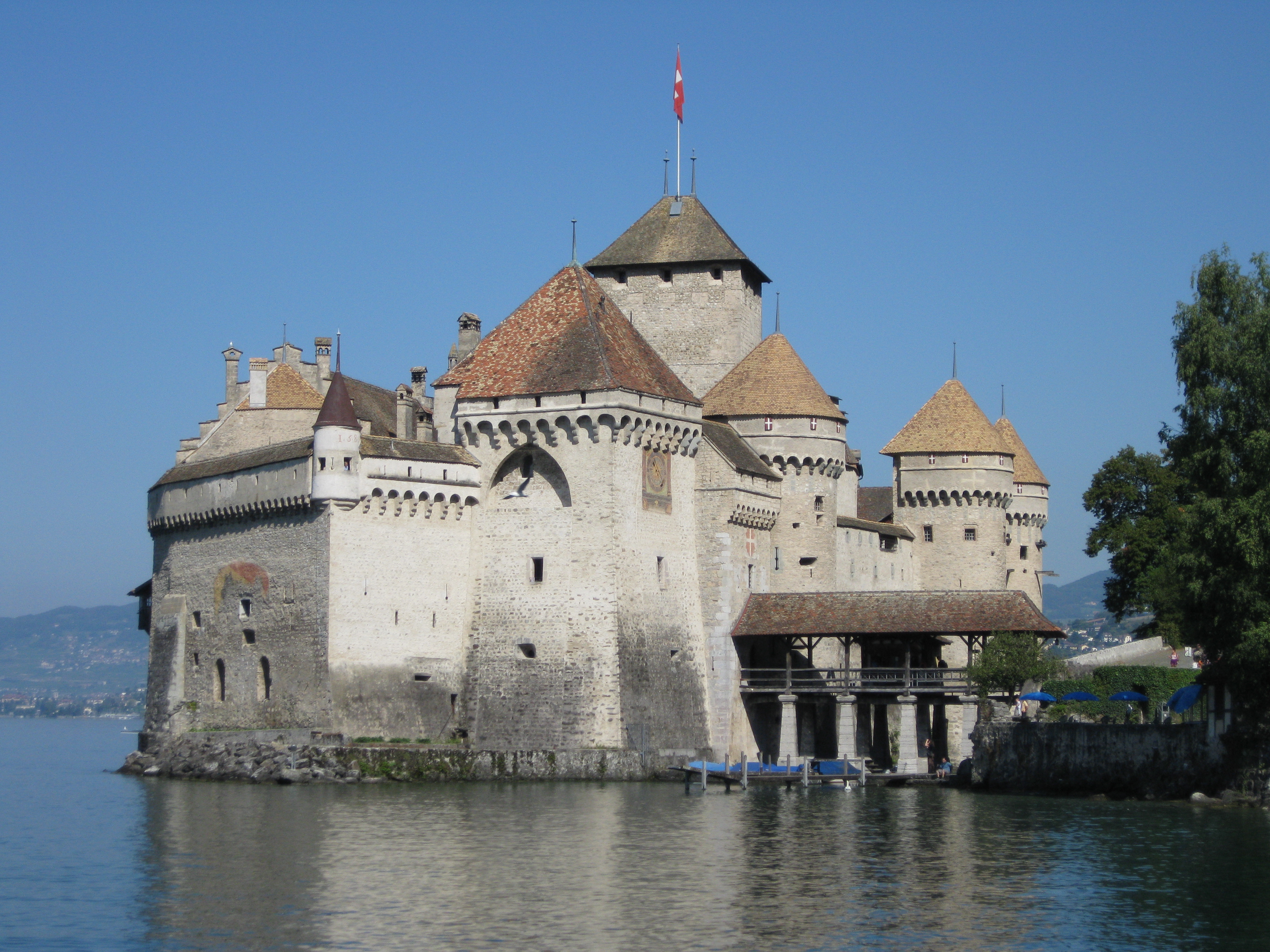
Chillon Castle

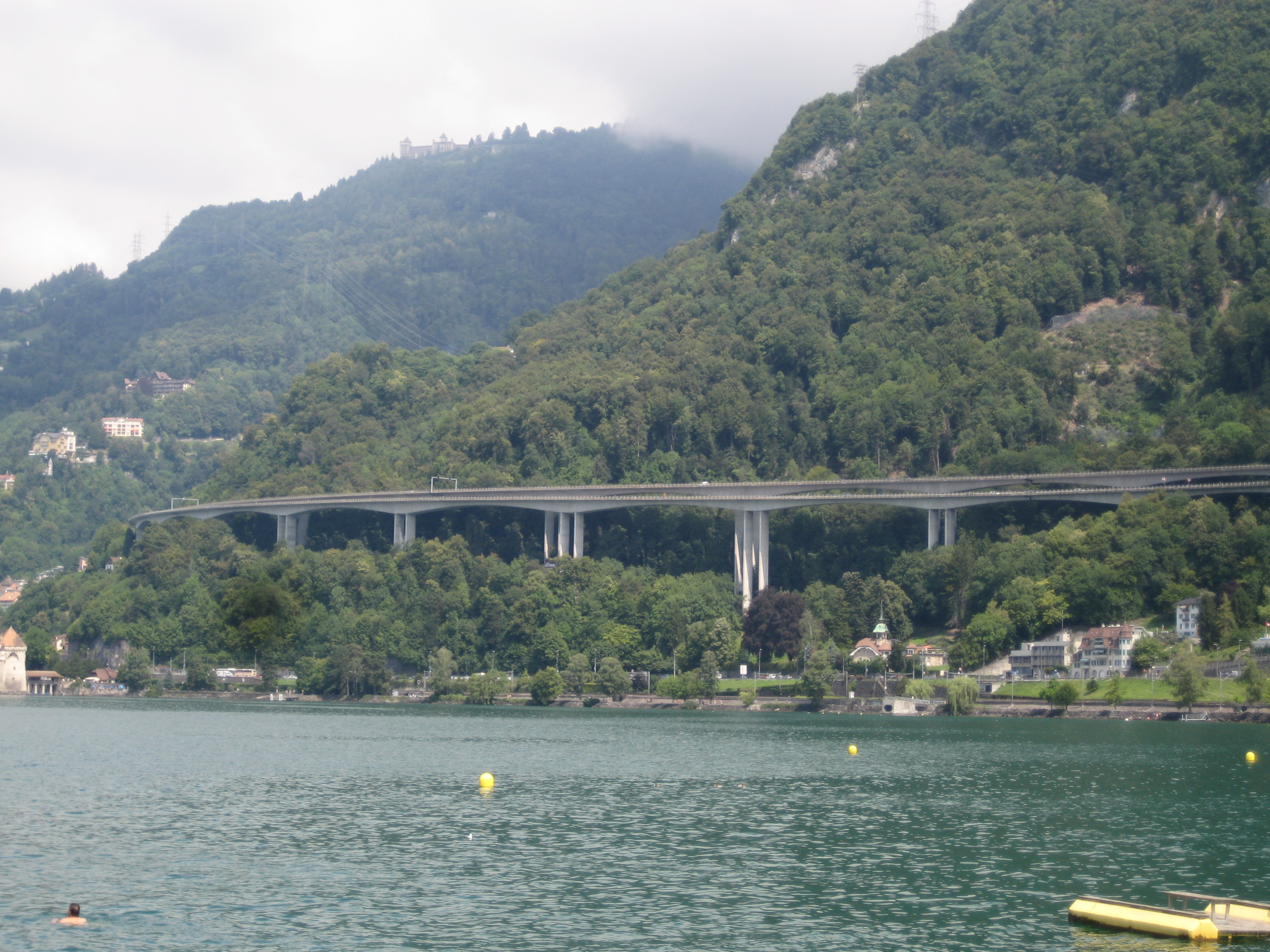
Viaduc autoroutier de Chillon sur la N9

== Politics ==
In the 2007 federal election the most popular party was the SVP which received 24.66% of the vote. The next three most popular parties were the FDP (17.74%), the SP (16.17%) and the LPS Party (13.62%). In the federal election, a total of 232 votes were cast, and the voter turnout was 37.3%.

== Economy ==
As of 2010, Veytaux had an unemployment rate of 4%. As of 2008, there were 3 people employed in the primary economic sector and about 1 business involved in this sector. 48 people were employed in the secondary sector and there were 8 businesses in this sector. 117 people were employed in the tertiary sector, with 24 businesses in this sector. There were 444 residents of the municipality who were employed in some capacity, of which females made up 42.8% of the workforce.

In 2008 the total number of full-time equivalent jobs was 135. The number of jobs in the primary sector was 3, of which were in agriculture and 3 were in forestry or lumber production. The number of jobs in the secondary sector was 46 of which 4 or (8.7%) were in manufacturing and 10 (21.7%) were in construction. The number of jobs in the tertiary sector was 86. In the tertiary sector; 8 or 9.3% were in wholesale or retail sales or the repair of motor vehicles, 1 was in the movement and storage of goods, 21 or 24.4% were in a hotel or restaurant, 14 or 16.3% were technical professionals or scientists, 2 or 2.3% were in education and 2 or 2.3% were in health care.

In 2000, there were 124 workers who commuted into the municipality and 386 workers who commuted away. The municipality is a net exporter of workers, with about 3.1 workers leaving the municipality for every one entering. Of the working population, 25% used public transportation to get to work, and 60.8% used a private car.

== Religion ==
From the 2000 census, 325 or 38.2% were Roman Catholic, while 301 or 35.4% belonged to the Swiss Reformed Church. Of the rest of the population, there were 5 members of an Orthodox church (or about 0.59% of the population), there was 1 individual who belongs to the Christian Catholic Church, and there were 14 individuals (or about 1.65% of the population) who belonged to another Christian church. There were 18 (or about 2.12% of the population) who were Islamic. There were 7 individuals who were Hindu and 4 individuals who belonged to another church. 125 (or about 14.69% of the population) belonged to no church, are agnostic or atheist, and 56 individuals (or about 6.58% of the population) did not answer the question.

== Education ==
In Veytaux about 361 or (42.4%) of the population have completed non-mandatory upper secondary education, and 154 or (18.1%) have completed additional higher education (either university or a Fachhochschule). Of the 154 who completed tertiary schooling, 51.3% were Swiss men, 22.7% were Swiss women, 15.6% were non-Swiss men and 10.4% were non-Swiss women.

In the 2009/2010 school year there were a total of 2,106 students in the Montreux school district. In the Vaud cantonal school system, two years of non-obligatory pre-school are provided by the political districts. During the school year, the political district provided pre-school care for a total of 817 children of which 456 children (55.8%) received subsidized pre-school care. The canton's primary school program requires students to attend for four years. There were 1,056 students in the municipal primary school program. The obligatory lower secondary school program lasts for six years and there were 931 students in those schools. There were also 119 students who were home schooled or attended another non-traditional school.

As of 2000, there were 17 students in Veytaux who came from another municipality, while 92 residents attended schools outside the municipality.

In 2009 the Fondation du Château de Chillon was visited by 313,200 visitors (the average in previous years was 290,098).

== Transportation ==
The municipality has a railway station, Veytaux-Chillon, on the Simplon line. It has regular service to Grandson, Lausanne, and Aigle.
