= Villeneuve VD railway station =

Railway station in Villeneuve, Vaud, Switzerland

Villeneuve VD
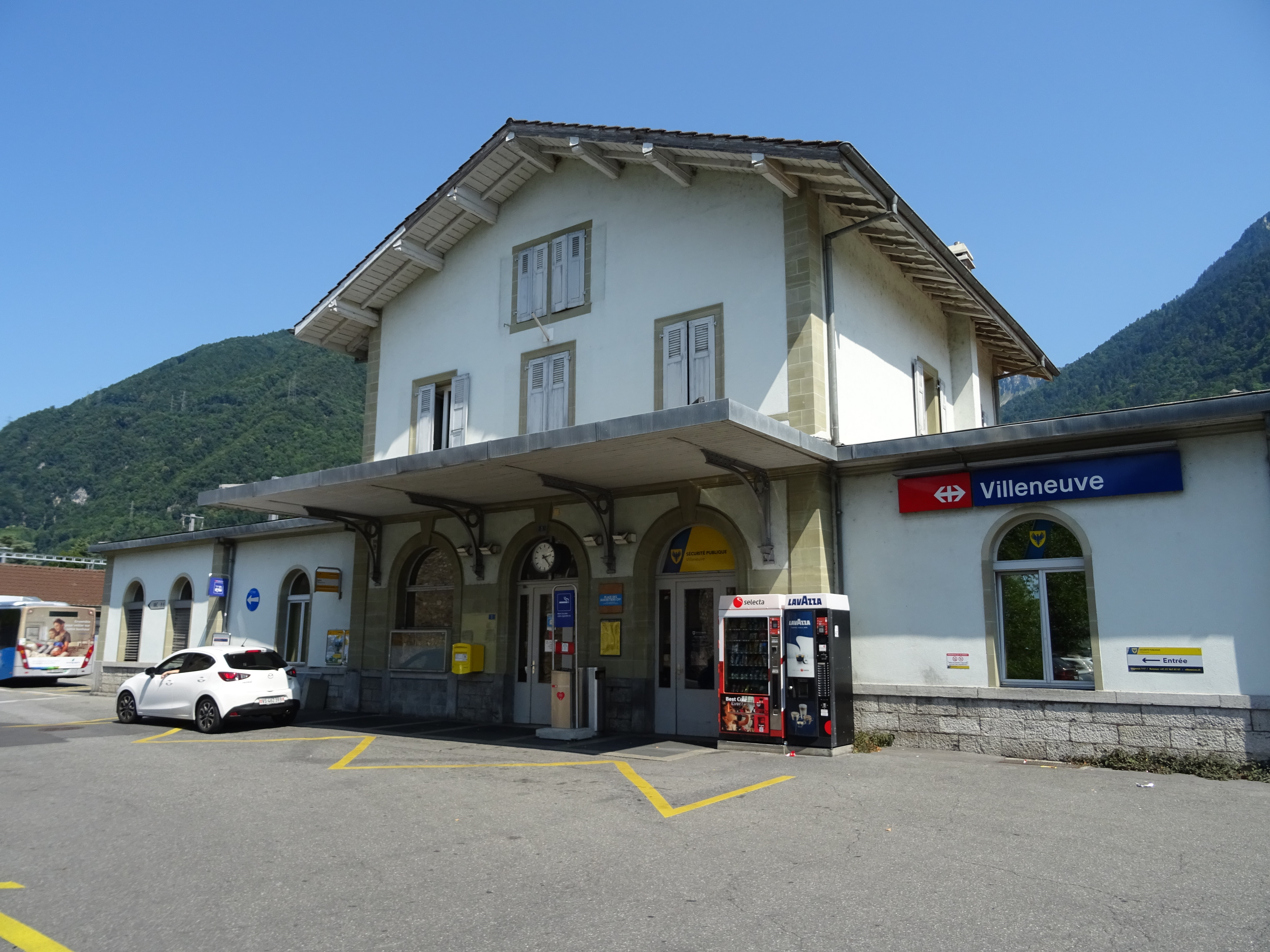
- The station building in 2021

General information
- Location: Villeneuve; Switzerland
- Coordinates: 46°23′54″N 6°55′37″E
- Elevation: 374 m (1,227 ft)
- Owner: Swiss Federal Railways
- Line: Simplon line
- Distance: 29.3 km (18.2 mi) from Lausanne
- Platforms: 3; 1 side platform; 1 island platform
- Tracks: 5
- Train operators: Swiss Federal Railways
- Connections: CarPostal Suisse buses; Transports Publics du Chablais buses; VMCV buses and trolleybus line

Construction
- Parking: Yes (69 spaces)
- Cycle facilities: Yes (16 spaces)
- Accessible: Platform 1 only

Other information
- Station code: 8501303 (VIL)
- Fare zone: 77 (mobilis)

History
- Former names: Villeneuve (until 2020)

Passengers
- 2023: 3'900 per weekday (SBB)

Services
Preceding station	SBB CFF FFS	Following station
Montreux towards Annemasse or Geneva Airport	RE33	Aigle towards St-Maurice or Martigny
Veytaux-Chillon Weekends only towards Annemasse	RE33	Aigle towards St-Maurice
Montreux towards Lausanne	RegioExpress Limited service	Aigle towards St-Maurice
Preceding station	RER Vaud	Following station
Montreux towards Vallorbe	R3	Roche VD towards Vevey
Veytaux-Chillon towards Le Brassus or Vallorbe	R4	Aigle towards Vevey
Location

Villeneuve VD railway station (French: Gare de Villeneuve VD) is a railway station in the municipality of Villeneuve, in the Swiss canton of Vaud. It is an intermediate stop on the standard gauge Simplon line of Swiss Federal Railways. The station is one city block east of the Villeneuve ferry terminal, with service to various destinations on Lake Geneva.

== Services ==
As of the December 2024 timetable change, the following services stop at Villeneuve VD:

- RegioExpress:
  - half-hourly service (hourly on weekends) between Annemasse and St-Maurice, and hourly service from St-Maurice to Martigny. On weekends, hourly service to Geneva Airport.
  - two round-trips in each direction between Lausanne and St-Maurice.
- RER Vaud R3 / R4: half-hourly (hourly on weekends) service between Vallorbe and Bex; hourly service to Le Brassus; limited service from Bex to St-Maurice.
