= VMCV =

VMCV may refer to:

- Vevey–Montreux–Chillon–Villeneuve tramway, a former tramway in the Swiss canton of Vaud
- Vintage Motorcycle Club of Victoria, a motor cycle club in the Australian state of Victoria
- VMCV SA, the bus and trolleybus operator in the Swiss towns of Vevey and Montreux
