= Corseaux-Cornalles railway station =

Railway station in Corseaux, Switzerland

Corseaux-Cornalles
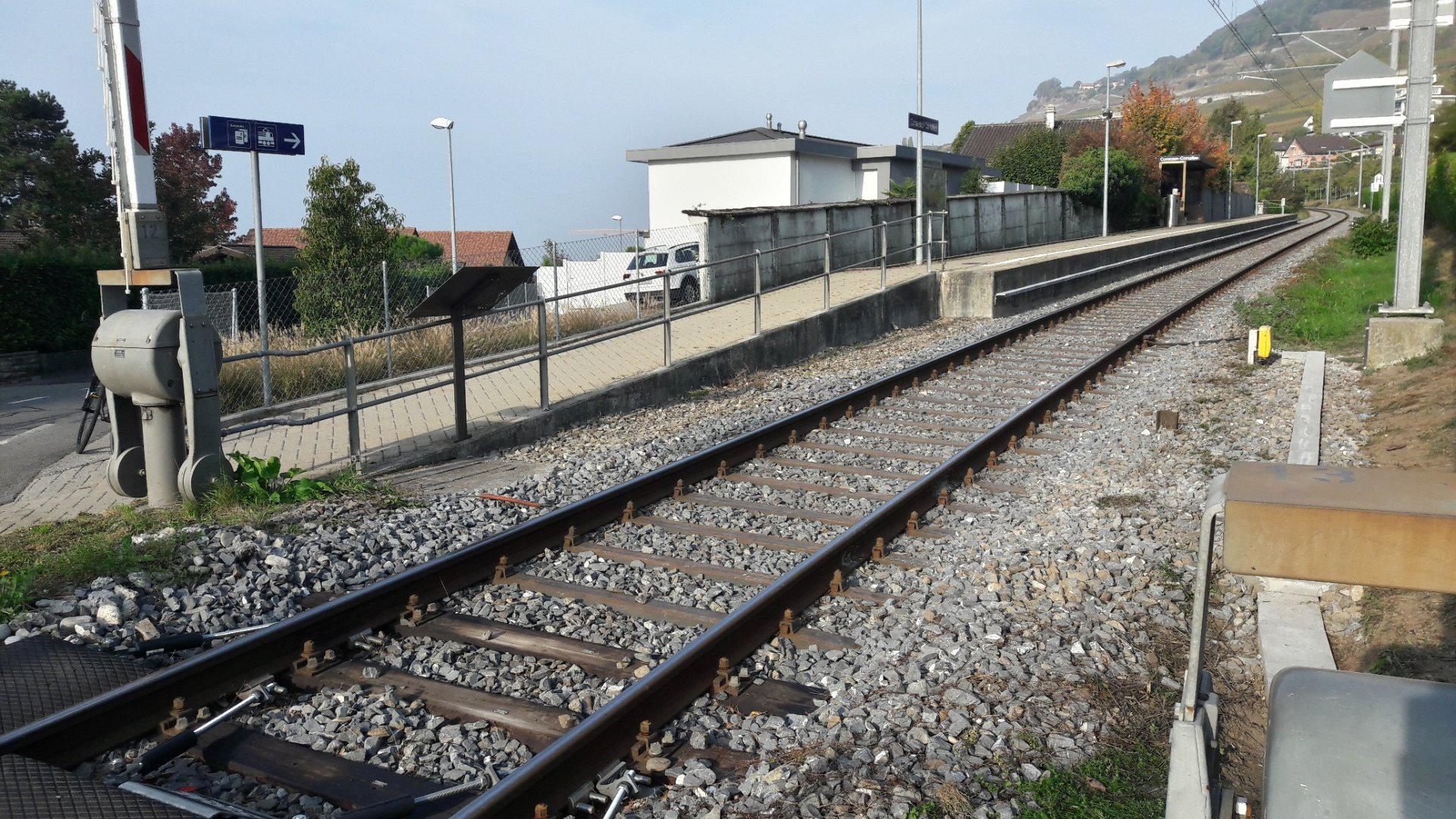
- The station in 2018

General information
- Location: Corseaux; Switzerland
- Coordinates: 46°28′14″N 6°49′29″E
- Elevation: 420 m (1,380 ft)
- Owner: Swiss Federal Railways
- Line: Vevey–Chexbres line
- Distance: 1.8 km (1.1 mi) from Vevey
- Platforms: 1 side platform
- Tracks: 1
- Train operators: Swiss Federal Railways
- Connections: VMCA bus line

Construction
- Parking: 0
- Accessible: Yes

Other information
- Station code: 8504040 (CORS)
- Fare zone: 70 and 71 (mobilis)

Passengers
- 2023: 100 per weekday (SBB)

Services
Preceding station	RER Vaud	Following station
Chexbres-Village towards Palézieux	R7 Limited service	Vevey One-way operation
Location

Corseaux-Cornalles railway station (French: Gare de Corseaux-Cornalles) is a railway station in the municipality of Corseaux, in the Swiss canton of Vaud. It is an intermediate stop on the standard gauge Vevey–Chexbres line of Swiss Federal Railways. Rail services at this station were limited with the December 2024 timetable change and replaced with a bus service number 218 between Vevey and Chexbres.

== Services ==
As of the December 2024 timetable change, the following services stop at Corseaux-Cornalles:

- RER Vaud R7: limited service in the evenings to Palézieux.
