= Veytaux-Chillon railway station =

Railway station in Veytaux, Switzerland

Veytaux-Chillon
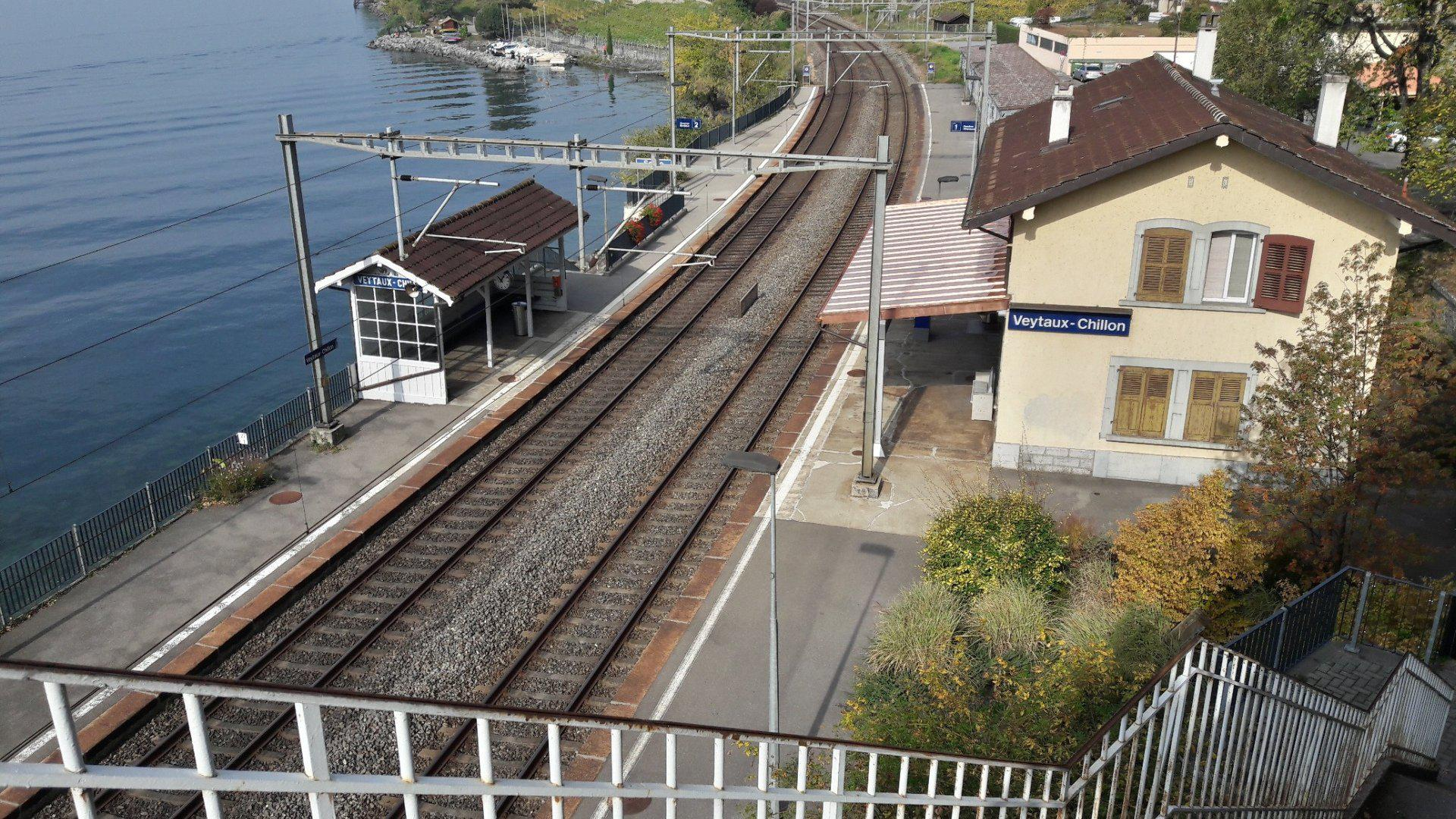
- The station building in 2018

General information
- Location: Veytaux; Switzerland
- Coordinates: 46°25′03″N 6°55′40″E
- Elevation: 379 m (1,243 ft)
- Owner: Swiss Federal Railways
- Line: Simplon line
- Distance: 27.1 km (16.8 mi) from Lausanne
- Platforms: 2 (2 side platforms)
- Tracks: 2
- Train operators: Swiss Federal Railways
- Connections: VMCV trolleybuses

Construction
- Accessible: No

Other information
- Station code: 8501302 (VEY)
- Fare zone: 77 (mobilis)

Passengers
- 2023: 200 per weekday (SBB)

Services
Preceding station	SBB CFF FFS	Following station
Montreux towards Annemasse	RE33 Weekends only	Villeneuve VD towards St-Maurice
Preceding station	RER Vaud	Following station
Territet towards Le Brassus or Vallorbe	R4	Villeneuve VD towards Vevey
Location

Veytaux-Chillon railway station (French: Gare de Veytaux-Chillon) is located in the municipality of Veytaux, in the Swiss canton of Vaud. It is an intermediate stop on the standard gauge Simplon line of Swiss Federal Railways. The station is adjacent to the Chillon Castle.

== Services ==
As of the December 2024 timetable change, the following services stop at Veytaux-Chillon:

- RegioExpress: hourly service between Annemasse and St-Maurice on weekends between April–August.
- RER Vaud R4: hourly service between Le Brassus and Bex; hourly service to Vallorbe on weekdays; limited service from Bex to St-Maurice.
