= Chexbres railway station =

Chexbres railway station may refer to the following in Switzerland:

- Chexbres-Village railway station, in Chexbres, canton of Vaud, Switzerland
- former names of Puidoux railway station, in Puidoux (near Chexbres):
  - Chexbres railway station (until 1904)
  - Puidoux-Chexbres railway station (1904-2018)
