= Clarens–Chailly–Blonay Railway =

Railway line in Canton of Vaud, Switzerland

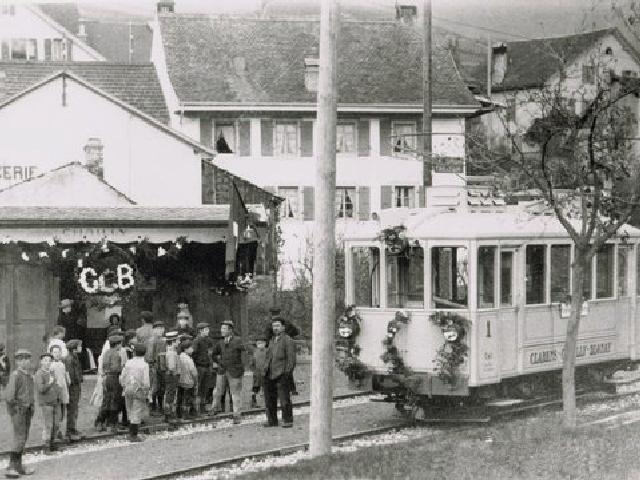

History
- Opened: 1911
- Closed: 1955

Technical
- Line length: 5.6 kilometres (5,600 m)
- Track gauge: 1,000 mm (3 ft 3 3/8 in) metre gauge
- Electrification: 750 V DC Overhead line

The Clarens–Chailly–Blonay Railway (CCB) or chemin de fer Clarens–Chailly–Blonay was a metre gauge electric railway that operated from 1911 to 1955. At its greatest extent, it ran from the boat landing stage on Lake Geneva in Clarens, via Chailly to Blonay, terminating alongside the station of the Chemins de fer electriques Veveysans (CEV), but not connected to that line.

== History ==
The line was opened on 23 December 1911 from Clarens (a point above the railway underbridge carrying the main line between Geneva and Montreux) to Blonay. The line to the boat landing stage was not originally built due financial problems and it was 3 1/2 years before it was completed, opening on 4 July 1915. Its life was short, the last stage to open being the first to close, on 31 October 1943; the remainder closed on 31 December 1955.

== Route description ==
The line was 5.6 km (3.5 mi) long, of which 3.5 km (2.2 mi) was on the road and 2.1 km (1.3 mi) on its own right of way. Leaving the boat landing stage at Clarens the line joined with that of the Vevey–Montreux–Chillon–Villeneuve tramway for a distance of 163 m (534.8 ft) until reaching the Place Gambetta where it left the tramway and headed north towards the railway station where the main line railway was negotiated by means of an underbridge.

Following the road to the suburb of Tavel the line made its first crossing of the Clarens river and headed for Chailly, 2 km (1.2 mi) distant. At Chailly the line, at the station, was joined by another, latterly only a siding but originally a 200 m (656.2 ft) branch to reach the village. After leaving Chailly the Clarens river was crossed again as the line climbed to the Rapes aux Roz where it crossed the Montreux - Brent road near Planchamp. Shortly after this the main line of the Montreux–Lenk im Simmental line was crossed by an underbridge before the line passed through its only tunnel, just 81 m (265.7 ft) long. The line followed the MOB to reach Fontanivent station, the CCB having to cross the MOB into a headshunt where the trains reversed in order to continue their journey.

From Fontanivent the line followed the road betwixt Montreux and Blonay through the village of Brent and made its third crossing of the Clarens valley over the Pont de Brent viaduct. Following the road to just south of the village of Tercier when it left for a run on its own reservation until it reached the railway station at Blonay. Talks to build a "joint" station with the CEV came to nought and the tramway built its own facilities to the rear of the main platform.

The route can be seen on the Swiss federal mapping website.

== Technical information ==
The line has a height difference of 243 m (797.2 ft) between its termini and a maximum gradient of 8.7%. The line had four passing places and only two significant engineering structures, the tunnel at Fontanivent and the Brent viaduct. Overhead equipment, provided by Oerlikon (MFO), had a supply of 750 V DC, the same as the MOB at the time and the loading gauge had the same height and roof arc, but was slightly narrower. This was done with the intention of the line taking some goods traffic from the MOB. The line had no workshops or sheds, maintenance was carried out by the MOB at the Chernex depot. Power was supplied from the MOB power station, again at Chernex.

The cost of the line was CHF 655,980.43 to the end of 1912 and it was increased to CHF 718,484.04 by the end of 1913 with the construction of the extension to the quayside at Clarens.

== Rolling stock ==
At opening the line had three Ce 2/2 4-wheel railcars, numbered 1, 2 and 3, each with 14 seats and electrical equipment provided by MFO. All three lasted the full life of the line being scrapped in 1955. In 1913 Ateliers de Constructions Mécaniques de Vevey delivered 2 small baggage trailers, M 1 and M 2. One of these was, in the late 1920s, at least temporarily, fitted out to carry passengers. M1 was scrapped in 1955, M 2 was converted to a service vehicle for use on the MOB.

The line gained three trailer cars from the Compagnie Genevoise des Tramways Électriques (CGTE), C 11 and C 12 arrived on the line in 1930, C 14 in 1932. Like the railcars they could seat 14 but also had places for 10 standees. These trailers were originally built in 1896 as part of a batch of Ce 1/2 cars for internal use at the national exhibition held that year. They were rebuilt by CGTE in 1901, used as trailers numbered C 301 - C 303 before coming to the CCB. All survived until closure.

== Preservation ==
An example similar to the 4 - wheel trams used is to be found in the Lucerne Transport Museum (Railway Hall).

== Vestiges ==
Apart from the crossings of the Baye de Clarens most notably the Brent viaduct, only a few vestiges remain visible as of 2021.

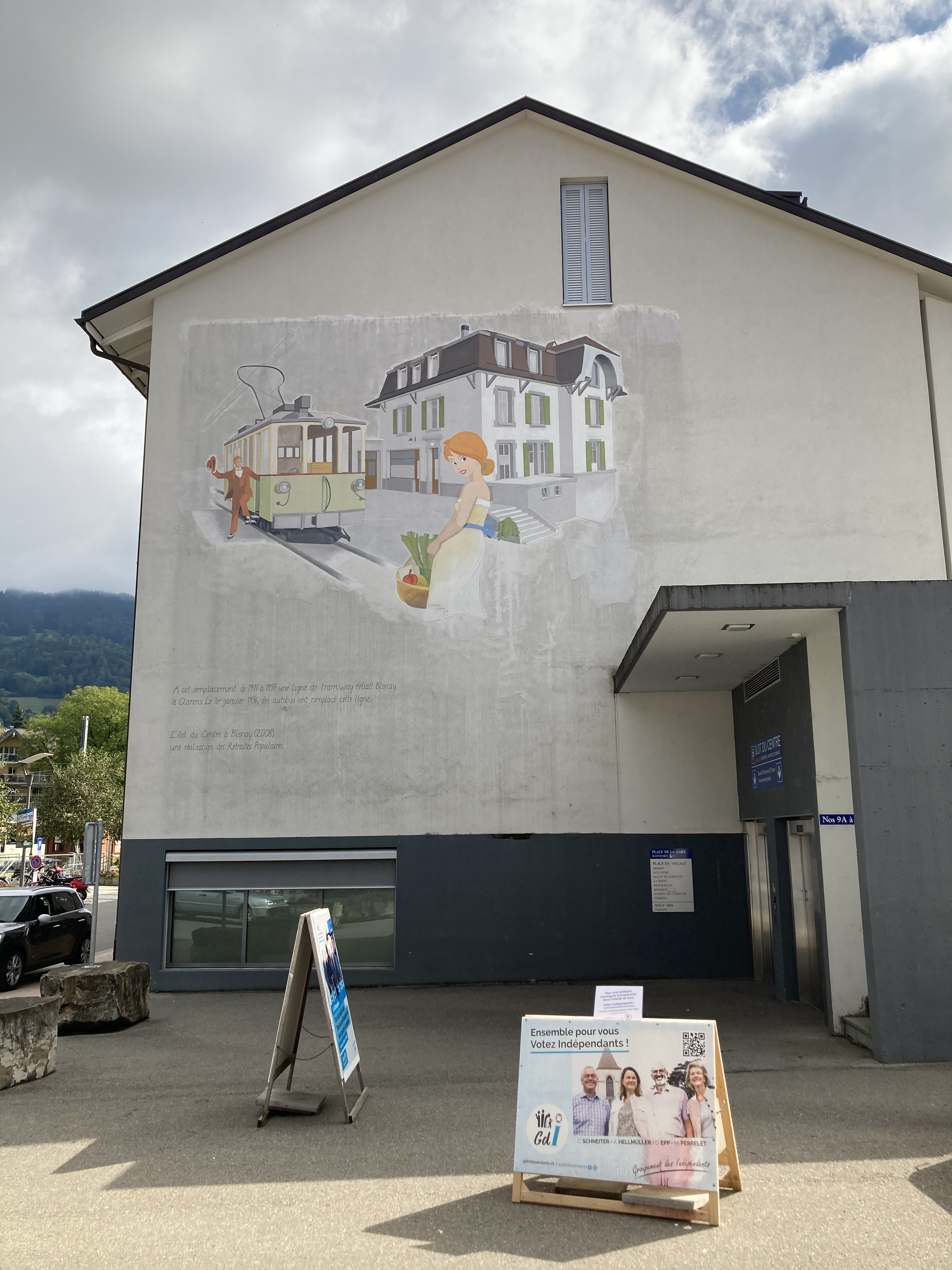
Mural on the site of the former CCB terminus at Blonay. The caption reads 'Upon this spot from 1911 to 1955, a tram line linked Blonay to Clarens. On the 1 January 1956, the line was replaced by buses."

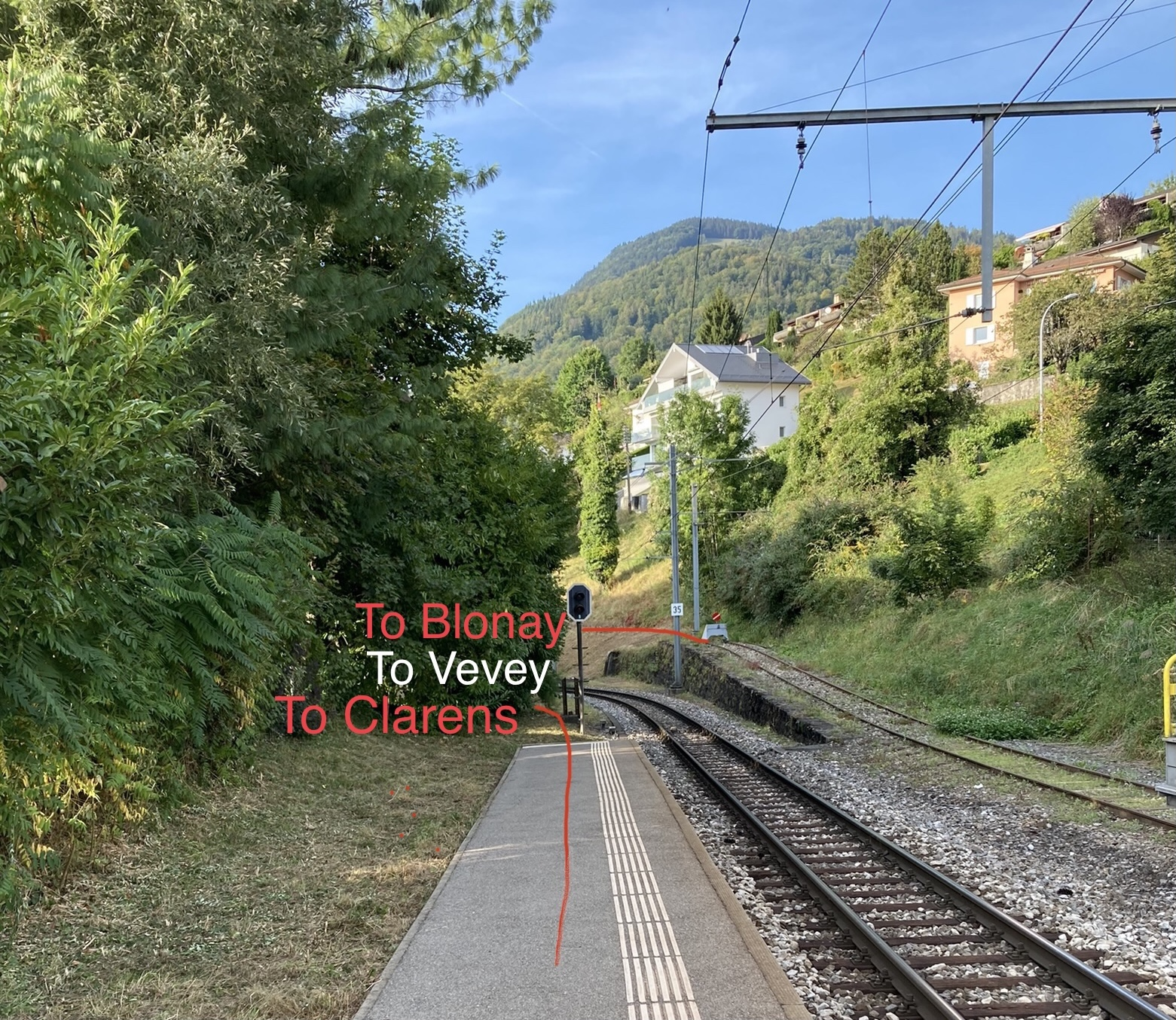
View NW from the MOB Fontanivent Station showing the remains of the line toward Blonay, now a siding, and the former alignment of track toward Clarens

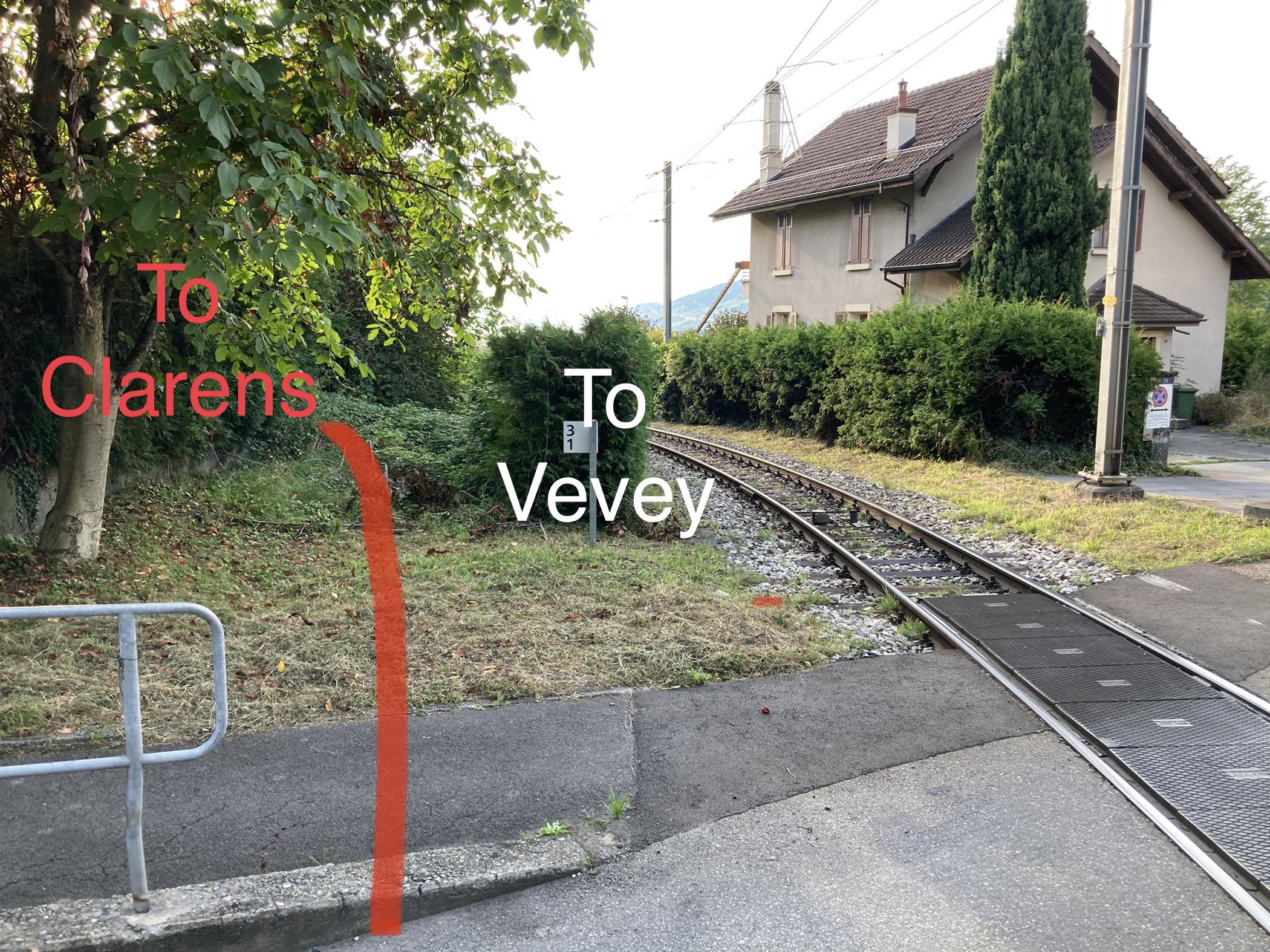
View SW from the lower level crossing at Fontanivent

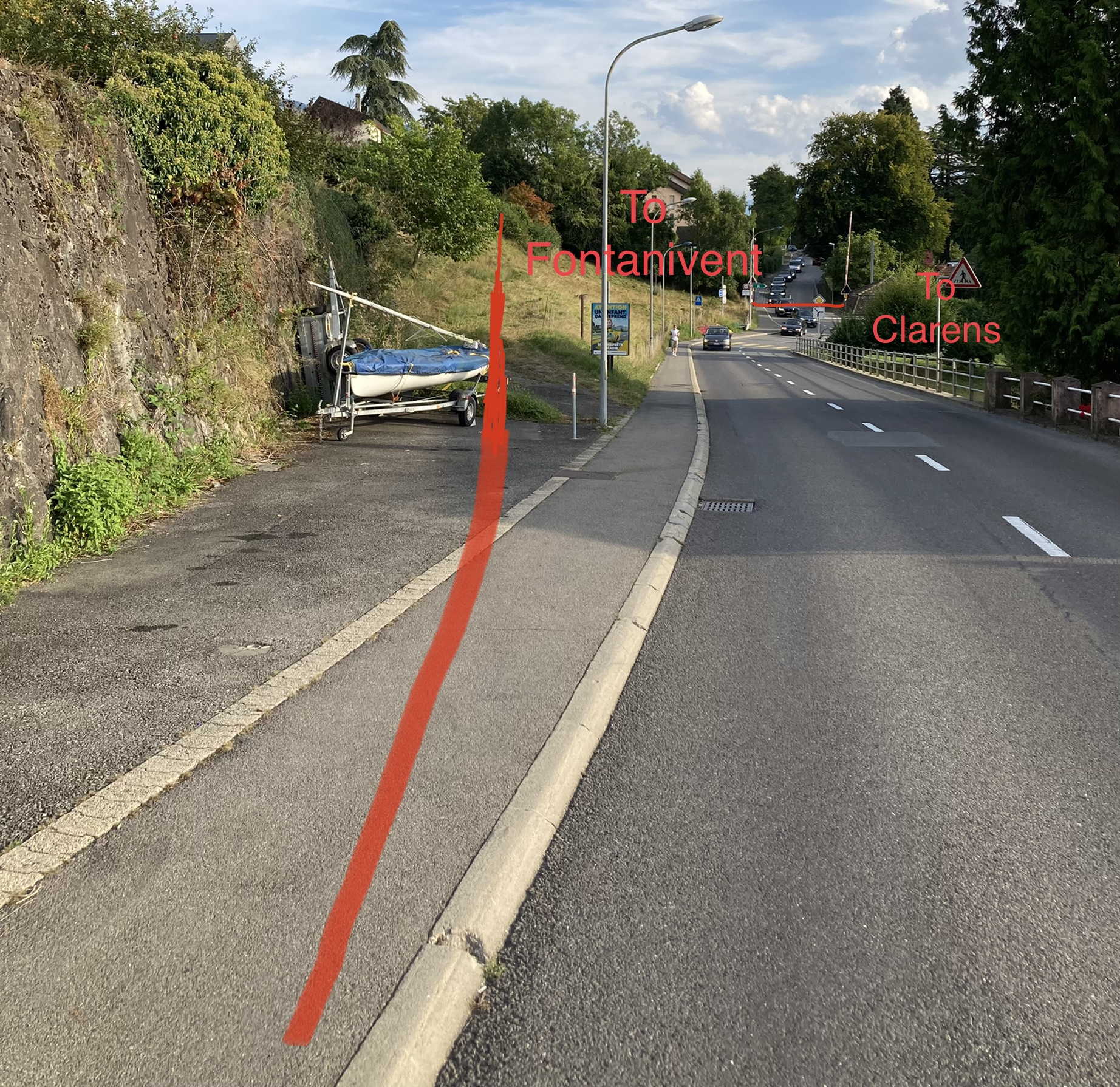
View SE from the route de Brent toward the lower level crossing at Fontanivent. The masonry of the trackside drains is partially visible.

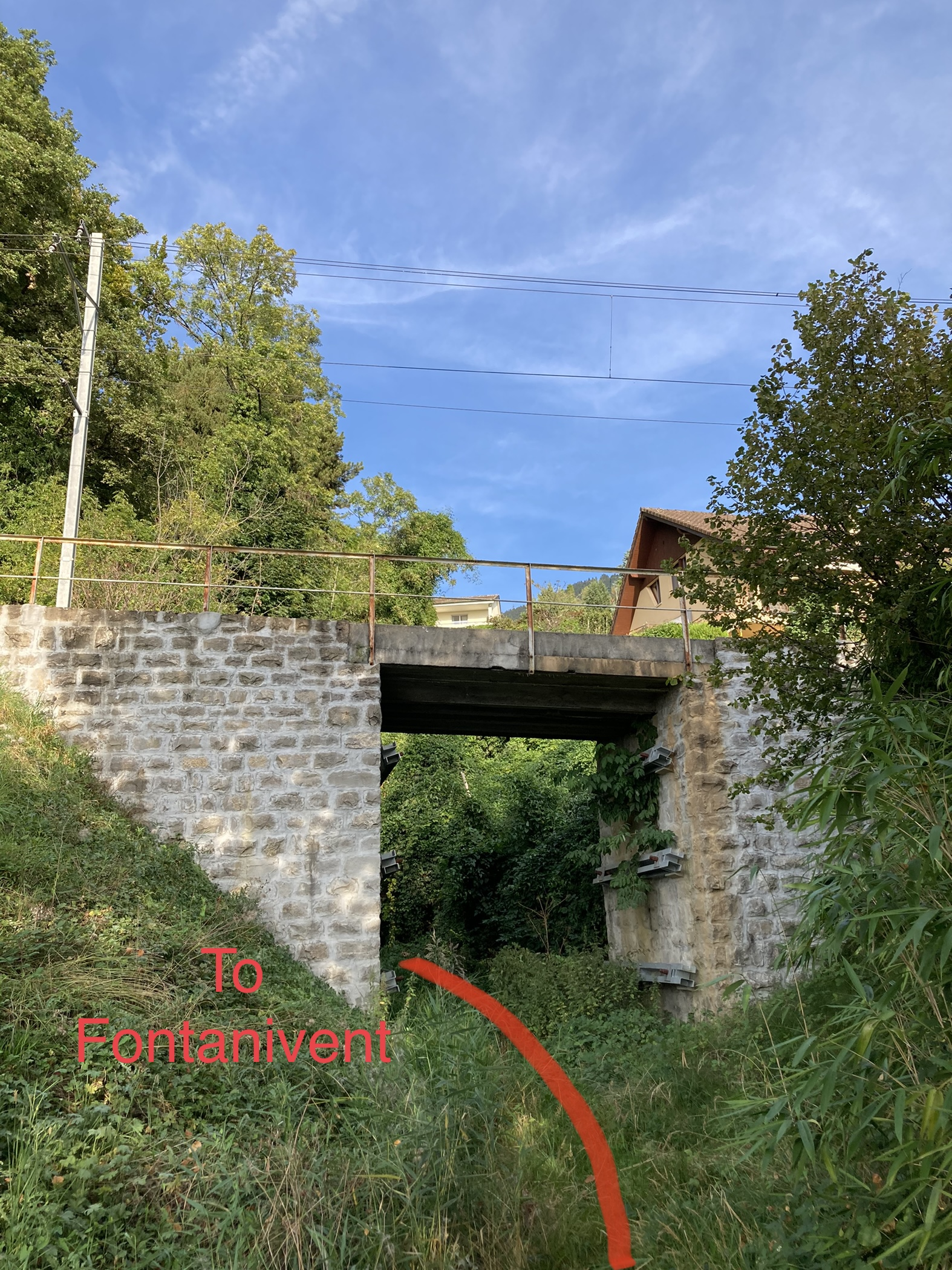
View N from route de Brent where the CCB alignment passed under that of the MOB

== Literature ==
- Continental Modeller (March 2004): Article with photographs and scale drawings of Ce 2/2 No. 2 tram by Jean-Louis Rochaix. ISSN 0955-1298
- Tramways and Light Railways of Switzerland and Austria by Rev. Richard J. Buckley (2000) Published by the Light Railway Transit Association. ISBN 0-948106-27-1
- Jean Paillard, Jean-Louis Rochaix, Gérald Hadorn, Pierre Stauffer and Michel Grandguillaume: Les Tramways vaudois, Bureau vaudois d'adresses (BVA), Lausanne 1979
- Bulletin technique de la Suisse romande (Volume: 39 Issue: 10 (1913)) Le chemin de fer Clarens-Chailly-Blonay Article about the early history of the line by Marcel Laplace-Delapraz
