= Vevey-Funi railway station =

Former railway station in Vevey, Switzerland

Vevey-Funi
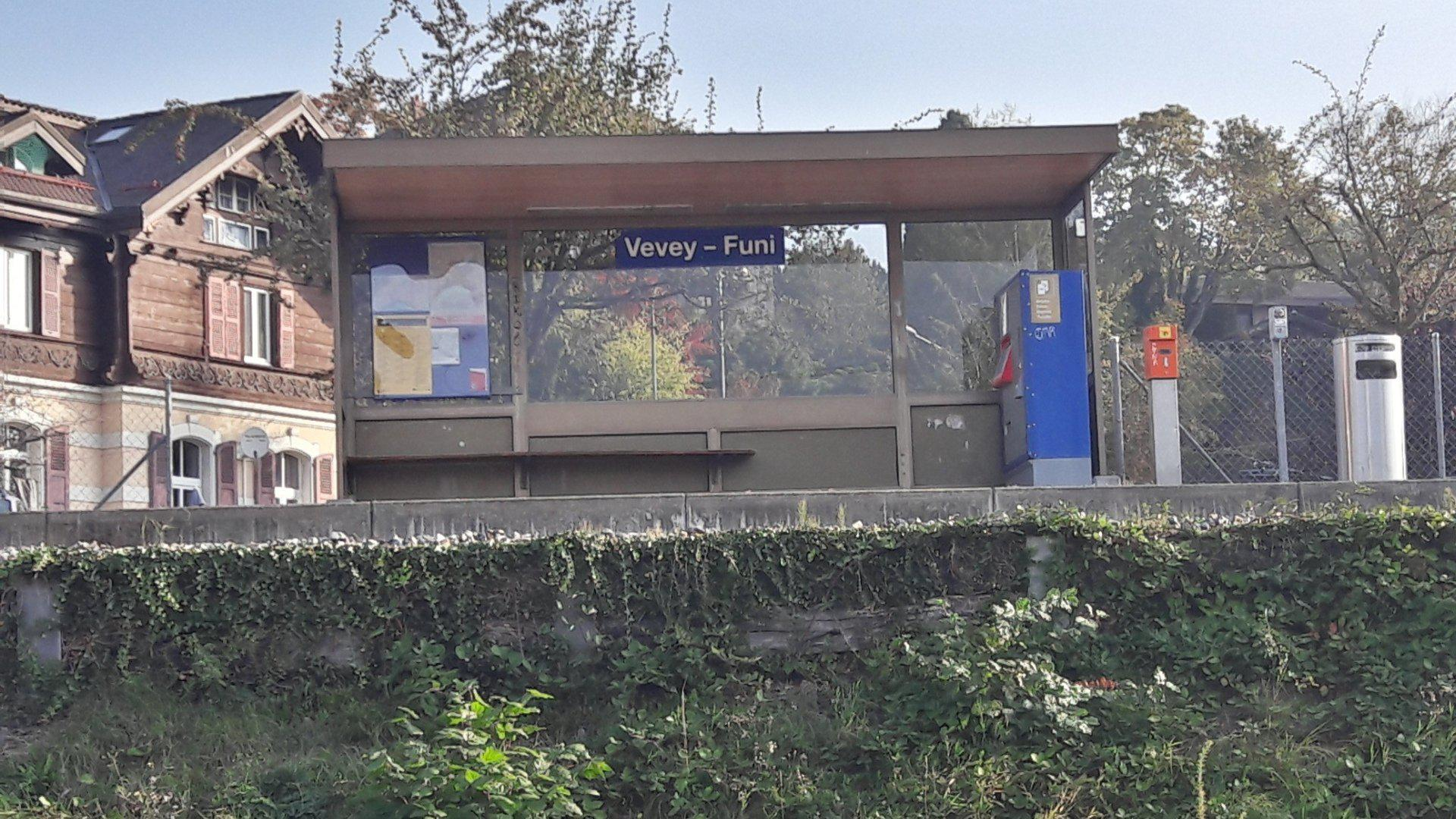
- The station shelter in 2018

General information
- Location: Vevey; Switzerland
- Coordinates: 46°28′06″N 6°50′08″E
- Elevation: 388 m (1,273 ft)
- Owner: Swiss Federal Railways
- Line: Vevey–Chexbres line
- Distance: 0.9 km (0.56 mi) from Vevey
- Platforms: 1 side platform
- Tracks: 1
- Connections: Vevey–Chardonne–Mont Pèlerin funicular railway; VMCA buses and; trolleybuses

Construction
- Parking: Yes (16 spaces)
- Accessible: Yes

Other information
- Station code: 8504015 (VVFU)

History
- Closed: 15 December 2024
Location

Vevey-Funi railway station (French: Gare de Vevey-Funi) was a railway station in the municipality of Vevey, in the Swiss canton of Vaud. It is an intermediate stop on the standard gauge Vevey–Chexbres line of Swiss Federal Railways. It is adjacent to the valley station of the Vevey–Chardonne–Mont Pèlerin funicular railway to Mont Pèlerin. Rail services at this station ended with the December 2024 timetable change and replaced with a rush-hour bus service number 218 between Vevey and Chexbres.
