= R7 (RER Vaud) =

Railway service in Switzerland

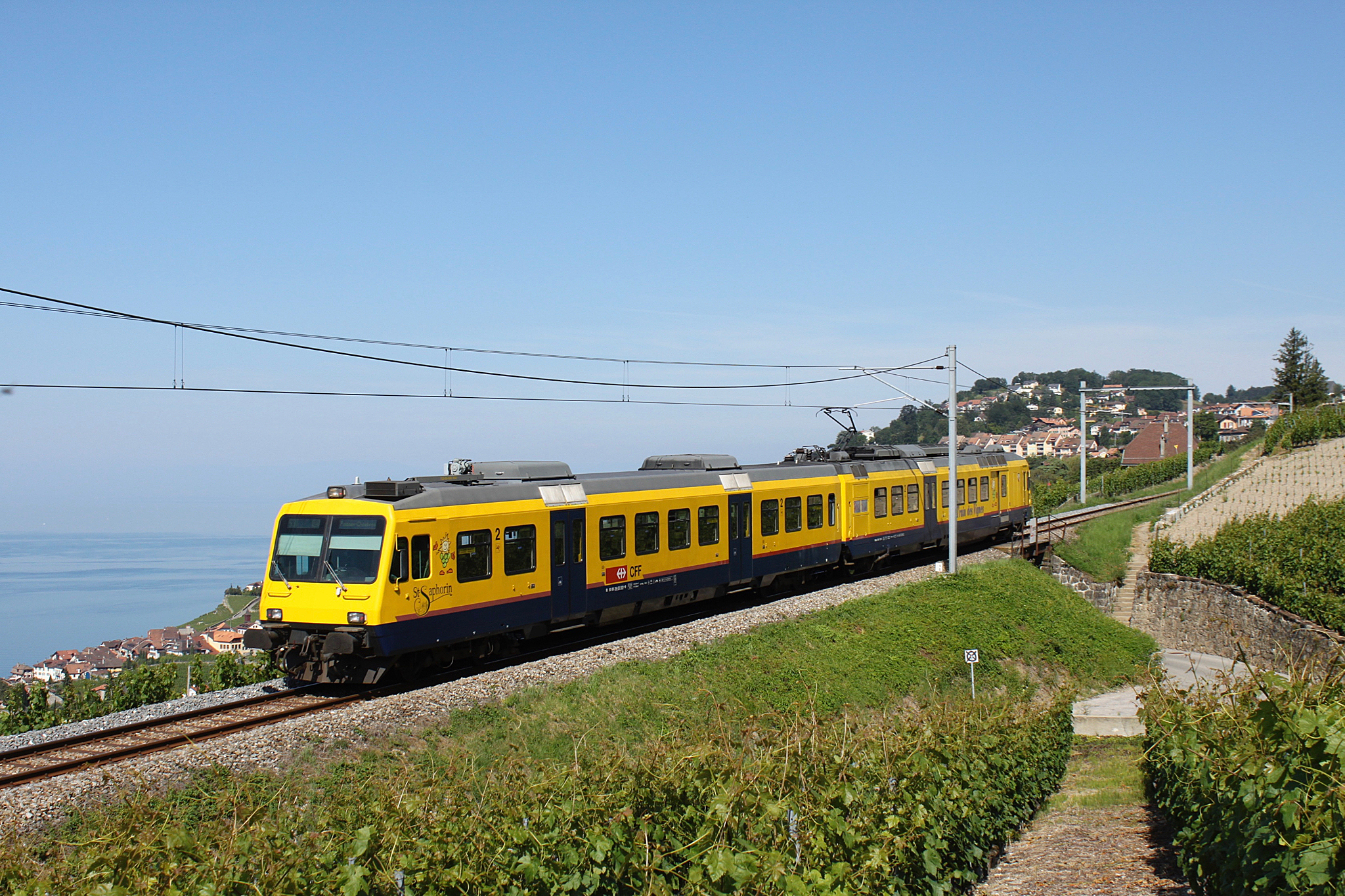
- An S31 at Chexbres in 2010

Overview
- First service: 13 December 2015
- Current operator(s): Swiss Federal Railways

Route
- Termini: Palézieux; Vevey
- Stops: 3
- Distance travelled: 16.3 kilometres (10.1 mi)
- Average journey time: 19 minutes
- Service frequency: Hourly
- Line(s) used: Vevey–Chexbres line; Lausanne–Bern line

The R7, also known the train of the vines (French: Train des Vignes), is a railway service of RER Vaud that provides hourly service between Palézieux and Vevey in the Swiss canton of Vaud. Swiss Federal Railways, the national railway company of Switzerland, operates the service. The service was previously known as the S7.

== Operations ==
The R7 operates hourly between Palézieux and Vevey over the Vevey–Chexbres line and the Lausanne–Bern line. It runs on the 7.8 kilometres (4.8 mi) long Vevey–Puidoux line and continues on the Lausanne–Bern line from Puidoux to Palézieux. The R7 is the only service over the line.

== History ==
RER Vaud introduced the S7 designation with the December 2015 timetable change, replacing the S31. Both routes operated between Puidoux and Vevey. The train service between those two places has long been called the "train of the vines" (French: Train des Vignes), dating back to private operation by the Chemin de fer Vevey–Chexbres. On 10 December 2023, all RER Vaud lines were renamed as "R" and a number, instead of "S." In December 2024, the service was extended from Puidoux to Palézieux, service ceased at Vevey-Funi and limited at Corseaux-Cornalles.
