= Chexbres-Village railway station =

Railway station in Chexbres, Switzerland

Chexbres-Village
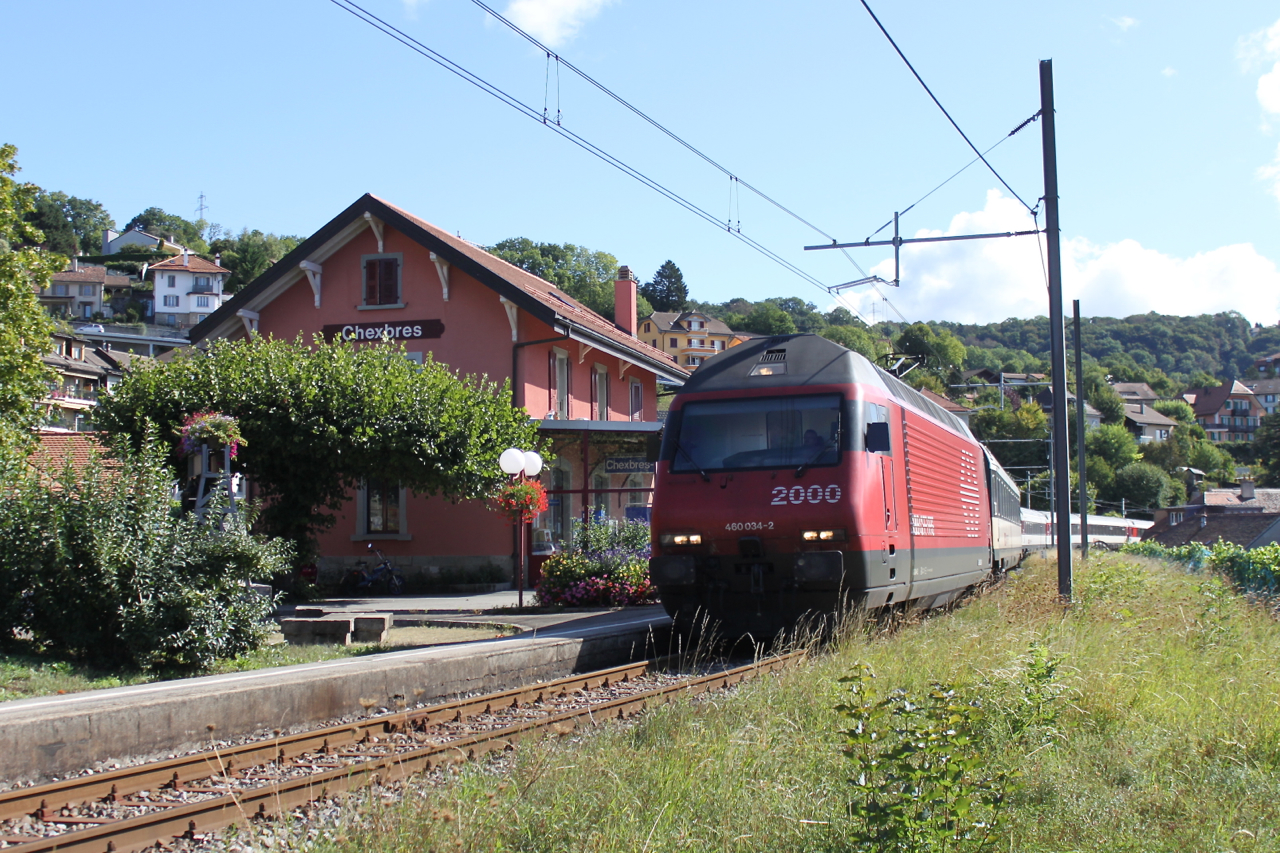
- A diverted InterRegio at the station in 2009

General information
- Location: Chexbres; Switzerland
- Coordinates: 46°28′52″N 6°46′43″E
- Elevation: 560 m (1,840 ft)
- Owner: Swiss Federal Railways
- Line: Vevey–Chexbres line
- Distance: 5.6 km (3.5 mi) from Vevey
- Platforms: 1 side platform
- Tracks: 1
- Train operators: Swiss Federal Railways
- Connections: CarPostal SA bus line

Construction
- Parking: Yes (60 spaces)
- Cycle facilities: Yes (10 spaces)
- Accessible: Yes

Other information
- Station code: 8504013 (CHX)
- Fare zone: 64 and 71 (mobilis)

Passengers
- 2023: 540 per weekday (SBB)

Services
Preceding station	RER Vaud	Following station
Puidoux towards Palézieux	R7	Vevey Terminus
Puidoux towards Palézieux	R7	Corseaux-Cornalles Limited service One-way operation
Location

Chexbres-Village railway station (French: Gare de Chexbres-Village) is a railway station in the municipality of Chexbres, in the Swiss canton of Vaud. It is an intermediate stop on the standard gauge Vevey–Chexbres line of Swiss Federal Railways.

== Services ==
As of the December 2024 timetable change, the following services stop at Chexbres-Village:

- RER Vaud R7: hourly service between Palézieux and Vevey.
