= Moreillon railway station =

Railway station in Puidoux, Switzerland

Moreillon
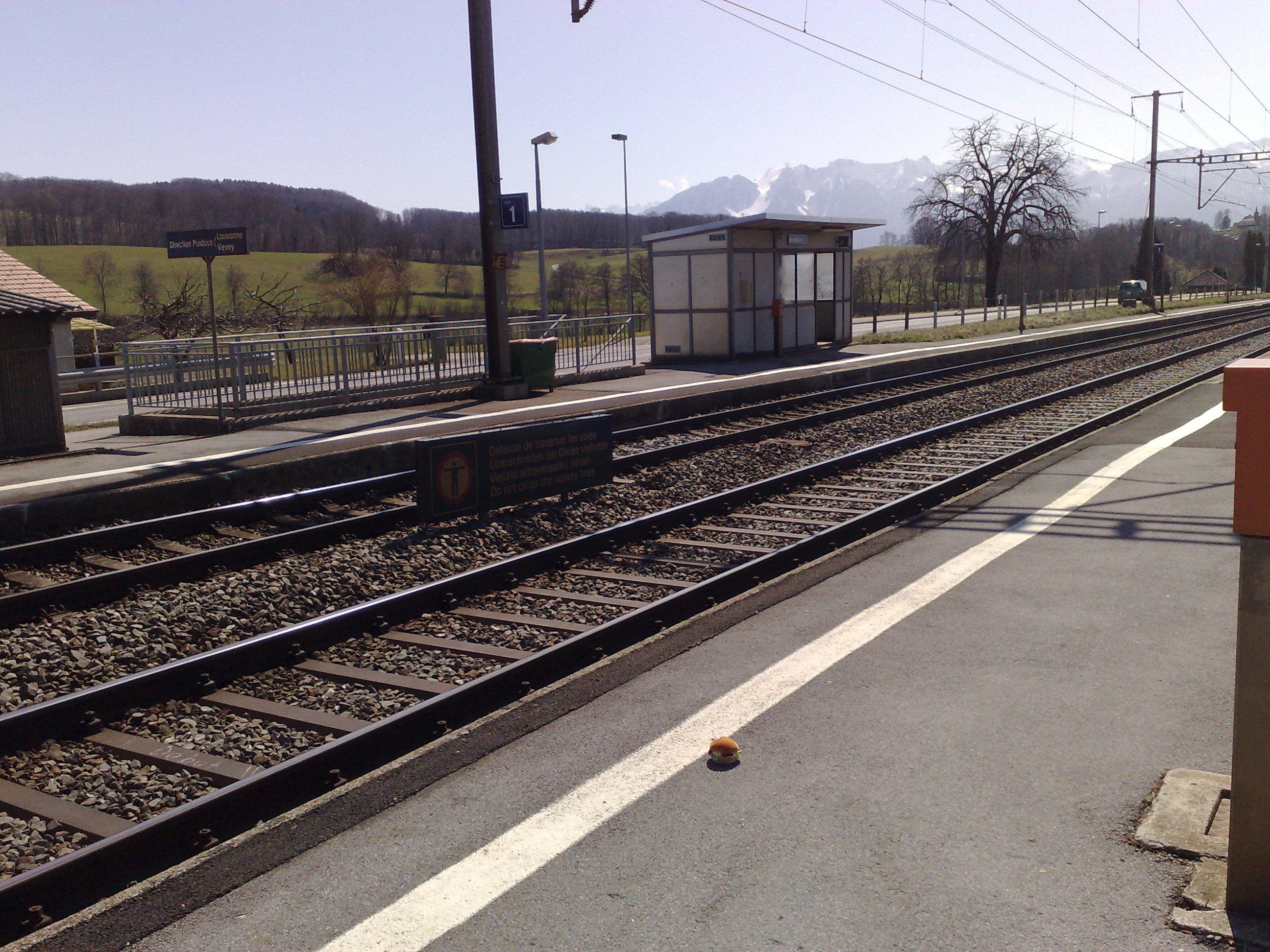
- The station platforms in 2008

General information
- Location: Puidoux; Switzerland
- Coordinates: 46°30′30″N 6°47′08″E
- Elevation: 657 m (2,156 ft)
- Owner: Swiss Federal Railways
- Line: Lausanne–Bern line
- Distance: 14.6 km (9.1 mi) from Lausanne
- Platforms: 2 side platforms
- Tracks: 2
- Train operators: Swiss Federal Railways
- Connections: CarPostal SA bus line

Construction
- Cycle facilities: Yes (7 spaces)
- Accessible: No

Other information
- Station code: 8504007 (MRL)
- Fare zone: 64 (mobilis)

Passengers
- 2023: 60 per weekday (SBB)

Services
Preceding station	RER Vaud	Following station
Puidoux towards Lausanne	S41	Palézieux towards Fribourg/Freiburg
Location

Moreillon railway station (French: Gare de Moreillon) is a railway station in the municipality of Puidoux, in the Swiss canton of Vaud. It is an intermediate stop on the standard gauge Lausanne–Bern line of Swiss Federal Railways.

== Services ==
As of the December 2024 timetable change, the following services stop at Moreillon:

- RER Vaud S41: hourly service between Lausanne and Fribourg/Freiburg.
