= Roche VD railway station =

Railway station in Roche, Vaud, Switzerland

Roche VD
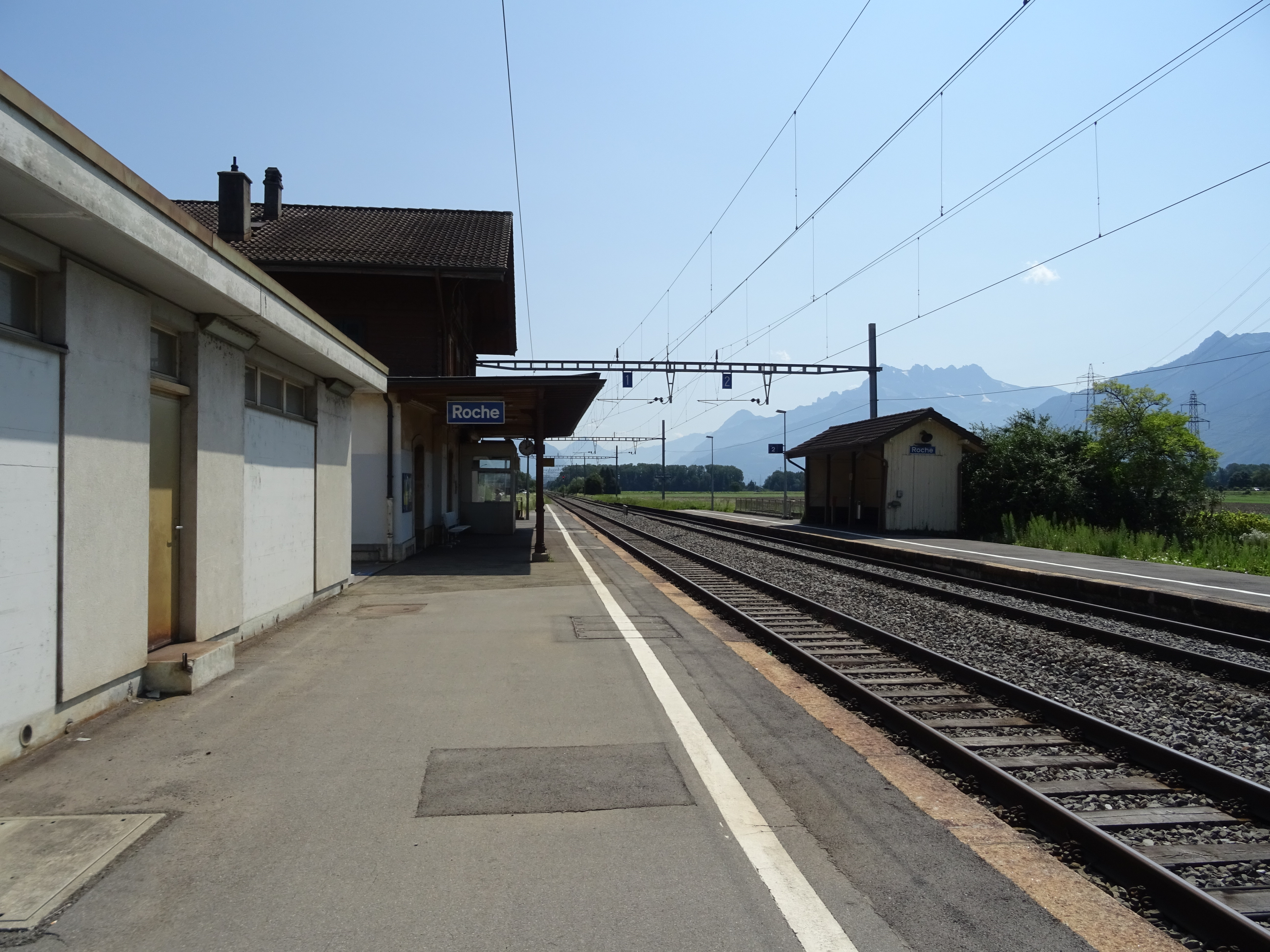
- The station in 2021

General information
- Location: Roche; Switzerland
- Coordinates: 46°21′31″N 6°55′37″E
- Elevation: 379 m (1,243 ft)
- Owner: Swiss Federal Railways
- Line: Simplon line
- Distance: 33.8 km (21.0 mi) from Lausanne
- Platforms: 2 (2 side platforms)
- Tracks: 2
- Train operators: Swiss Federal Railways

Construction
- Parking: Yes (10 spaces)
- Accessible: No

Other information
- Station code: 8501304 (ROC)
- Fare zone: 81 (mobilis)

Passengers
- 2023: 450 per weekday (SBB)

Services
Preceding station	RER Vaud	Following station
Villeneuve VD towards Vallorbe	R3	Aigle towards Vevey
Location

Roche VD railway station (French: Gare de Roche VD) is a railway station in the municipality of Roche, in the Swiss canton of Vaud. It is an intermediate stop on the standard gauge Simplon line of Swiss Federal Railways.

== Services ==
As of the December 2024 timetable change, the following services stop at Roche VD:

- RER Vaud R3: hourly service between Vallorbe and Bex, limited service to St-Maurice
