= Vevey–Chexbres railway line =

Railway line in Switzerland

Vevey–Chexbres
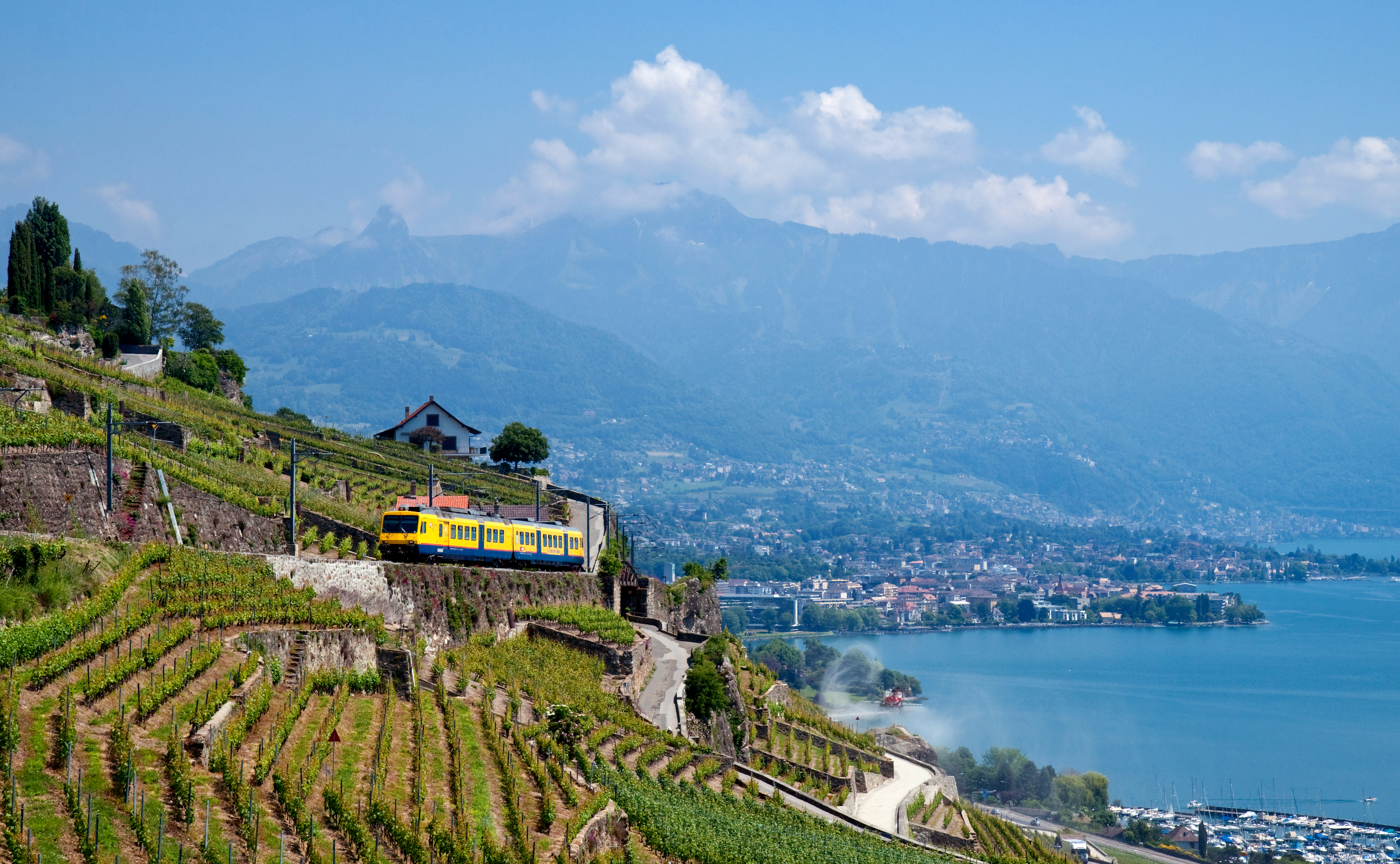
- Train des Vignes ("train of the vines") above Vevey, 4 June 2010

Overview
- Owner: Swiss Federal Railways
- Line number: 111
- Termini: Vevey; Puidoux-Chexbres

Service
- Services: RER Vaud R7

History
- Opened: 2 May 1904

Technical
- Line length: 7.83 km (4.87 mi)
- Number of tracks: 1
- Track gauge: 1,435 mm (4 ft 8 1/2 in) standard gauge
- Electrification: 15 kV/16.7 Hz AC overhead catenary
- Maximum incline: 4.4%

The Vevey–Puidoux-Chexbres railway line is a short, single-track standard gauge railway, connecting Vevey to Puidoux in the Swiss canton of Vaud. The line was built by the chemin de fer Vevey–Chexbres and is today owned and operated by Swiss Federal Railways.

== History ==
At the end of the 19th century, the idea emerged of a line linking the Simplon Railway to Chexbres on the Lausanne–Bern railway on the heights above Lake Geneva. The chemin de fer Vevey–Chexbres (VCh) was founded on 3 June 1899. Construction of the line began on 30 October 1900 and lasted until 2 May 1904. While the work was fairly easy, operations on the completed line is difficult. Indeed, the difference in altitude between its starting point and its end is 231 metres (758 ft) and only 23 % of the line is straight. The total cost of the works was CHF 1,720,000.

The company did not have the means to acquire rolling stock and negotiated with the Jura–Simplon Railway (chemin de fer Jura-Simplon) to operate it. The negotiations were unsuccessful and it ultimately a contract was concluded with the Swiss Federal Railways (SBB). Steam locomotives provide traction on the line until the late 1930s. On 14 November 1939, a project for the electrification of the line was presented and it was approved on 24 December. The electrification work lasted 5 months. 400 metres (1,300 ft) of track were modified and the Burignon bridge was reinforced to allow the passage of electric locomotives. The catenary was initially suspended by metal poles and comprised a steel wire and a copper contact line 70 millimetres (2.76 in) thick. It was fully rewired in 1995.

Several other programs for the repair and maintenance of the track have taken place. The most important is that carried out on 1965 on the whole line, tracks and sleepers, which were replaced with used equipment. The duration of this replacement was three weeks during which replacement buses were put into service.

The last stationmaster at Chexbres-Village left his post in 1981 when the crossovers were removed. A commercial agent still served the ticket office until 31 December 1989. Since then, only ticket vending machines have been available for customers.

The last general meeting of the VCh railway company was held in May 2013. It endorsed the full integration of the company with SBB, which became the owner of the line. The SBB then operated the line with NPZ Domino sets.

== Route ==
The line leaves Vevey station where it branches off the Simplon Railway. It crosses a bridge over main road 12 and from there it passes through five stations and halts. The first of these, immediately after the bridge, is the halt of Vevey-Funi. This connects with mont Pèlerin via the Vevey–Chardonne–Mont Pèlerin funicular railway. The line continues on its way on a ramp of 3.8% to its terminus. The line crosses the road at a guarded level crossing at kilometre 1.73, then reaches the halt of Corseaux-Cornalles at kilometre 1.8. This station was opened to the public in 1996, although it was open to schoolchildren on 24 September 1995. About 380 m further on is the second level crossing of the line. Everywhere else the line passes either over or under the road. The line continues to Chexbres-Village station at kilometer 5.6. Although it has several dead-end sidings, this station now has only one through track. The "private" halt of Le Verney lies at kilometer 7.0. This is a halt for workers in the industrial area of Verney. Trains stop there only at the beginning and the end of the work day. Finally at kilometre 7.83, the line reaches Puidoux station, the end of the line, where the line connects to the Lausanne–Bern railway.

== Operation ==
Passenger services over the line are provided by the RER Vaud R7, which operates hourly between Vevey and Palézieux. As of 2025, services are operated by NPZ Domino and RABe 523 multiple units.
