= Lac de Bret =

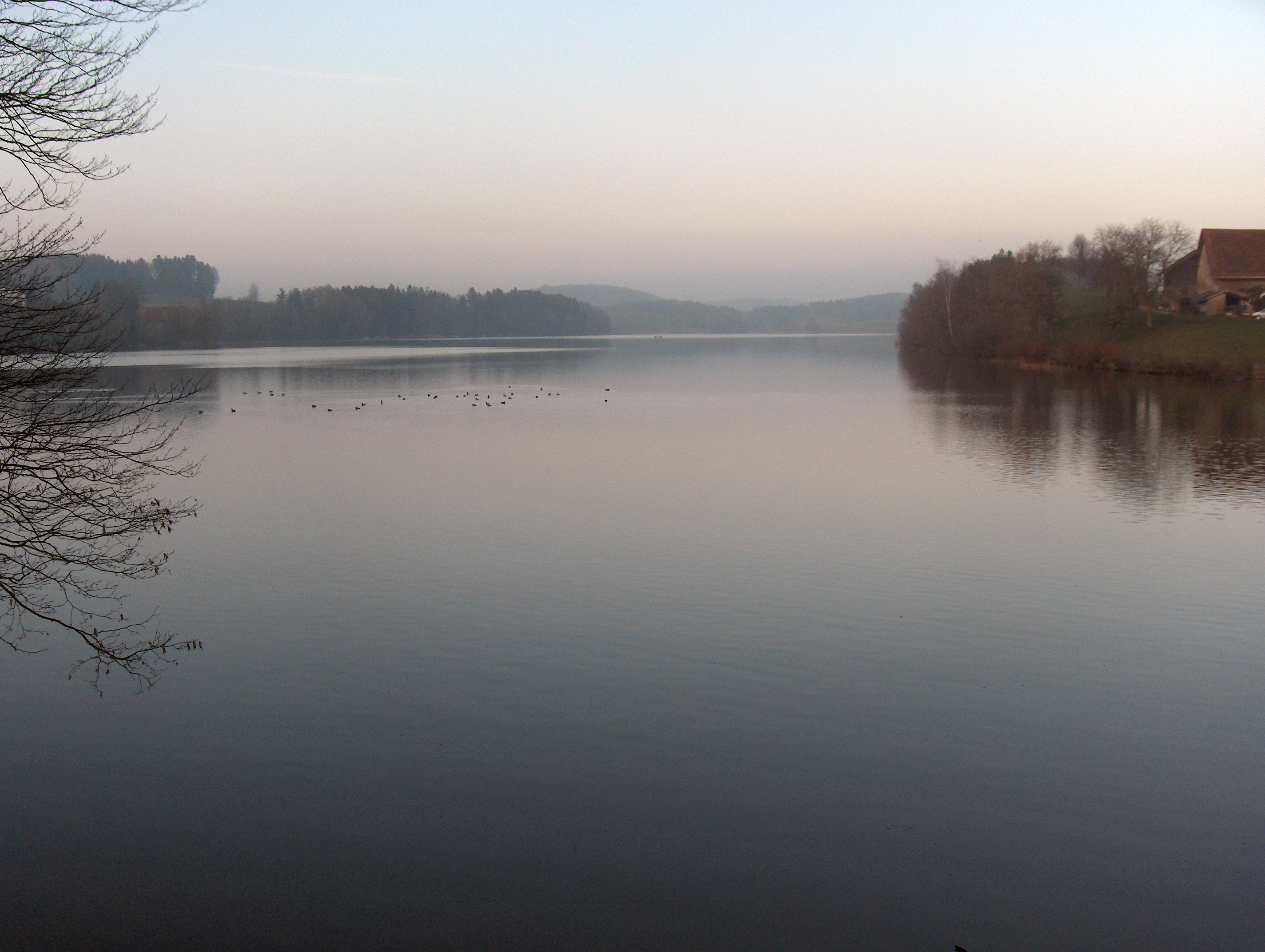
- View from the South side

- Location within Canton of Vaud Location within Switzerland Location within Alps
- Interactive map of Lac de Bret
- Location: Puidoux, Vaud
- Coordinates: 46°30′40″N 6°46′20″E
- Type: natural lake, eutrophic
- Catchment area: 21 km^{2} (8.1 sq mi)
- Basin countries: Switzerland
- Max. length: 1.5 km (0.93 mi)
- Max. width: 400 m (1,300 ft)
- Surface area: 0.36 km^{2} (0.14 sq mi)
- Max. depth: 13 m (43 ft)
- Water volume: 5,000,000 m^{3} (4,100 acre⋅ft)
- Surface elevation: 674 m (2,211 ft)

Lac de Bret is a lake in the municipality of Puidoux, in the canton of Vaud, Switzerland. It is located north of Lake Léman. The natural lake is used as a drinking water reservoir for the city of Lausanne. The first dam was built 1875 to supply water for the Lausanne-Ouchy funicular.

== See also ==
- List of lakes of Switzerland
