= Puidoux =

- Municipality
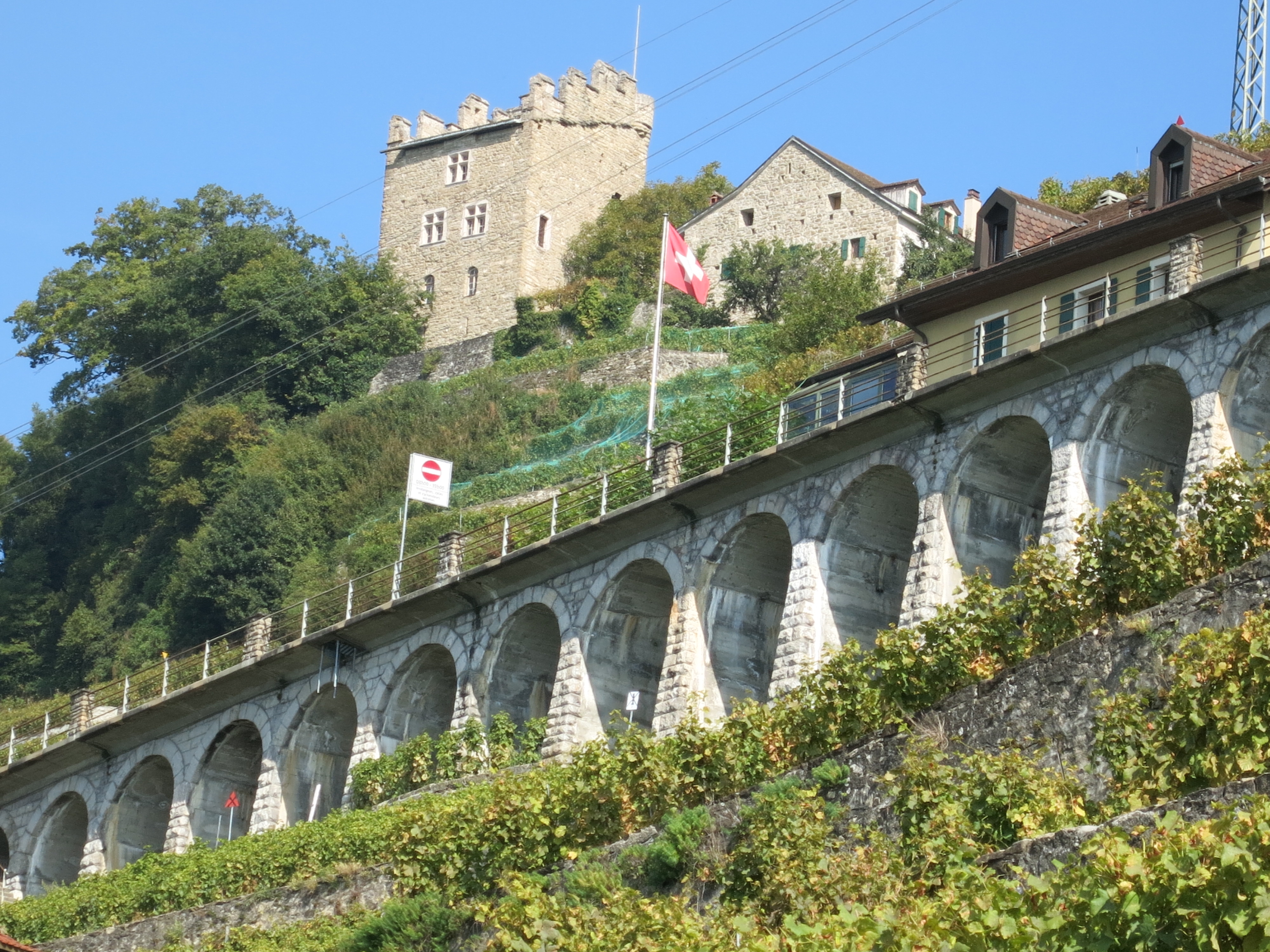

- Flag Coat of arms
- Location of Puidoux
- Location within Switzerland Location within Canton of Vaud
- Coordinates: 46°29′N 6°46′E
- Country: Switzerland
- Canton: Vaud
- District: Lavaux-Oron

Government
  - Mayor: Syndic; René Gilliéron (as of 2025)

Area
  - Total: 22.89 km^{2} (8.84 sq mi)
- Elevation: 662 m (2,172 ft)

Population (2000)
  - Total: 2,333
  - Density: 101.9/km^{2} (264.0/sq mi)
- Time zone: UTC+01:00 (CET)
  - Summer (DST): UTC+02:00 (CEST)
- Postal code: 1070
- SFOS number: 5607
- ISO 3166 code: CH-VD
- Surrounded by: Chardonne, Chexbres, Epesses, Forel (Lavaux), Granges (Veveyse) (FR), Les Tavernes, Les Thioleyres, Meillerie (FR-74), Rivaz, Saint-Gingolph (FR-74), Saint-Saphorin (Lavaux)
- Website: www.puidoux.ch

Puidoux (French pronunciation: [pɥidu]) is a municipality in Switzerland in the canton of Vaud, located in the district of Lavaux-Oron.

== History ==
Puidoux is first mentioned in 1134 as Puidos. It was part of Saint-Saphorin until 1810 when it became an independent municipality.

== Geography ==
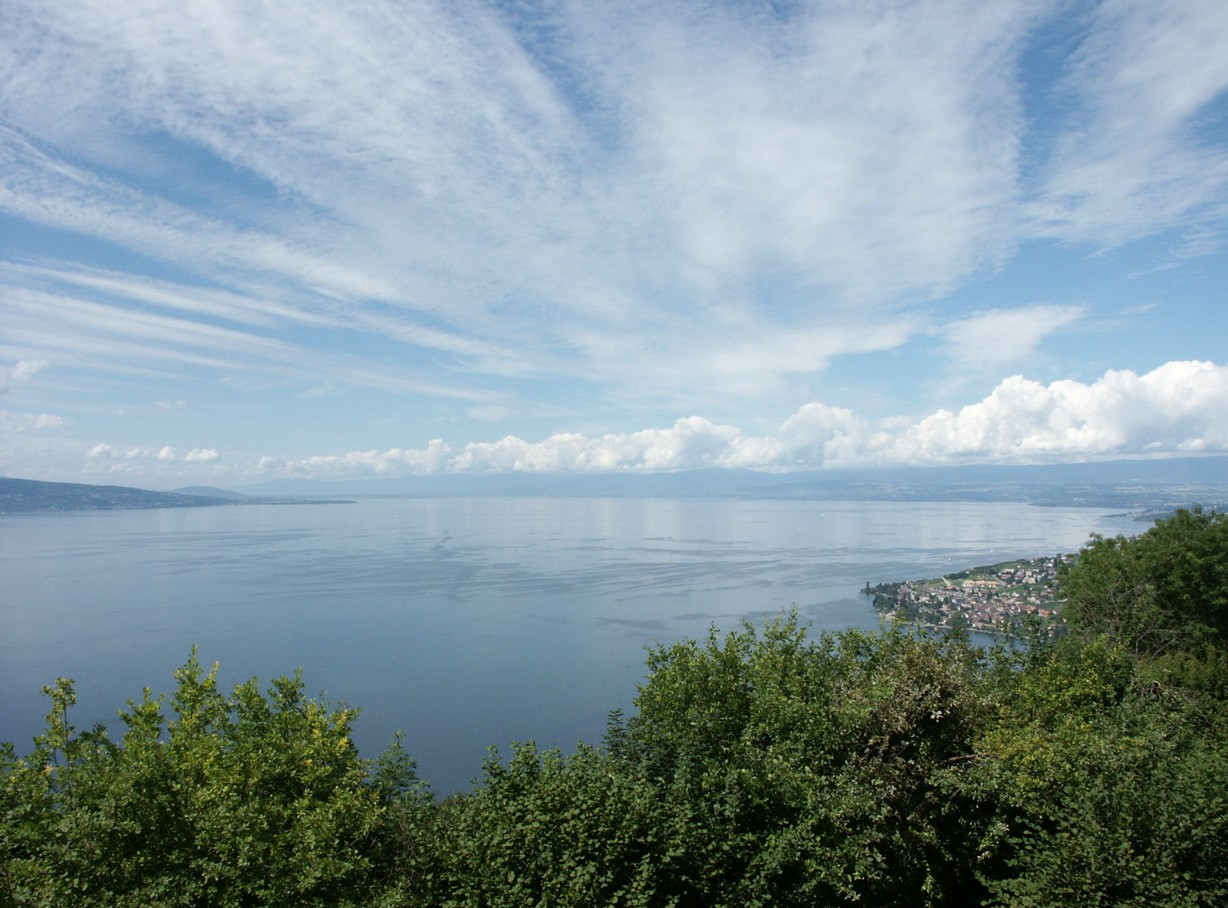
Lake Geneva from Puidoux

Puidoux has an area, as of 2009, of 22.89 square kilometres (8.84 mi^{2}). Of this area, 14.27 km^{2} (5.51 mi^{2}) or 62.3% is used for agricultural purposes, while 5.56 km^{2} (2.15 mi^{2}) or 24.3% is forested. Of the rest of the land, 2.4 km^{2} (0.93 mi^{2}) or 10.5% is settled (buildings or roads), 0.58 km^{2} (0.22 mi^{2}) or 2.5% is either rivers or lakes and 0.07 km^{2} (17 acres) or 0.3% is unproductive land.

Of the built up area, housing and buildings made up 2.8% and transportation infrastructure made up 4.2%. while parks, green belts and sports fields made up 2.3%. Out of the forested land, 21.8% of the total land area is heavily forested and 2.4% is covered with orchards or small clusters of trees. Of the agricultural land, 30.0% is used for growing crops and 26.1% is pastures, while 4.7% is used for orchards or vine crops and 1.5% is used for alpine pastures. All the water in the municipality is in lakes.

The municipality was part of the Lavaux District until it was dissolved on 31 August 2006, and Puidoux became part of the new district of Lavaux-Oron.

The municipality is located along Lake Geneva and stretches to the Jorat region and the Broye river. The lower section of the municipality consists of the village of Puidoux along the lake, the hamlets of Publoz and Cremières and the vineyards of Treytorrens and Dézaley. The upper section of the municipality includes scattered settlements along the ridges of Mont-Pèlerin, to the Lac de Bret and Mont-Chesau.

== Coat of arms ==
The blazon of the municipal coat of arms is Barry of Six Gules and Argent.

== Demographics ==
Puidoux has a population (as of December 2020) of 2,888. As of 2008, 28.7% of the population are resident foreign nationals. Over the last 10 years (1999–2009 ) the population has changed at a rate of 9.7%. It has changed at a rate of 2.8% due to migration and at a rate of 7.7% due to births and deaths.

Most of the population (as of 2000) speaks French (1,958 or 83.7%), with Portuguese being second most common (134 or 5.7%) and German being third (87 or 3.7%). There are 37 people who speak Italian.

Of the population in the municipality 666 or about 28.5% were born in Puidoux and lived there in 2000. There were 739 or 31.6% who were born in the same canton, while 301 or 12.9% were born somewhere else in Switzerland, and 579 or 24.8% were born outside of Switzerland.

In 2008 there were 24 live births to Swiss citizens and 8 births to non-Swiss citizens, and in same time span there were 15 deaths of Swiss citizens and 2 non-Swiss citizen deaths. Ignoring immigration and emigration, the population of Swiss citizens increased by 9 while the foreign population increased by 6. There were 3 Swiss men who emigrated from Switzerland and 2 Swiss women who immigrated back to Switzerland. At the same time, there were 28 non-Swiss men and 31 non-Swiss women who immigrated from another country to Switzerland. The total Swiss population change in 2008 (from all sources, including moves across municipal borders) was an increase of 3 and the non-Swiss population increased by 53 people. This represents a population growth rate of 2.3%.

The age distribution, as of 2009, in Puidoux is; 302 children or 11.9% of the population are between 0 and 9 years old and 296 teenagers or 11.7% are between 10 and 19. Of the adult population, 320 people or 12.6% of the population are between 20 and 29 years old. 389 people or 15.3% are between 30 and 39, 438 people or 17.3% are between 40 and 49, and 321 people or 12.7% are between 50 and 59. The senior population distribution is 248 people or 9.8% of the population are between 60 and 69 years old, 114 people or 4.5% are between 70 and 79, there are 91 people or 3.6% who are between 80 and 89, and there are 17 people or 0.7% who are 90 and older.

As of 2000, there were 967 people who were single and never married in the municipality. There were 1,157 married individuals, 108 widows or widowers and 107 individuals who are divorced.

As of 2000, there were 970 private households in the municipality, and an average of 2.4 persons per household. There were 317 households that consist of only one person and 68 households with five or more people. Out of a total of 991 households that answered this question, 32.0% were households made up of just one person and there were 6 adults who lived with their parents. Of the rest of the households, there are 256 married couples without children, 332 married couples with children There were 51 single parents with a child or children. There were 8 households that were made up of unrelated people and 21 households that were made up of some sort of institution or another collective housing.

In 2000 there were 213 single family homes (or 44.8% of the total) out of a total of 475 inhabited buildings. There were 92 multi-family buildings (19.4%), along with 122 multi-purpose buildings that were mostly used for housing (25.7%) and 48 other use buildings (commercial or industrial) that also had some housing (10.1%). Of the single family homes 61 were built before 1919, while 13 were built between 1990 and 2000. The most multi-family homes (38) were built before 1919 and the next most (12) were built between 1961 and 1970. There were 5 multi-family houses built between 1996 and 2000.

In 2000 there were 1,071 apartments in the municipality. The most common apartment size was 3 rooms of which there were 332. There were 66 single room apartments and 217 apartments with five or more rooms. Of these apartments, a total of 896 apartments (83.7% of the total) were permanently occupied, while 124 apartments (11.6%) were seasonally occupied and 51 apartments (4.8%) were empty. As of 2009, the construction rate of new housing units was 0 new units per 1000 residents. The vacancy rate for the municipality, in 2010, was 0.09%.

The historical population is given in the following chart:

== Heritage sites of national significance ==
The municipality includes part of the UNESCO World Heritage Site: Lavaux, Vineyard Terraces which is also listed as a Swiss heritage site of national significance. The entire hamlet of Treytorrens is part of the Inventory of Swiss Heritage Sites.

== Tourism ==
Puidoux is a quiet area, yet a convenient base for exploring much of the Lac Leman region. Lenin came here with his wife Krupskaya in August 1904, where they planned the "Conference of the Twenty Two ". Puidoux Village is a small crossroads yet boasts an auberge (inn) and two restaurants. Local food can be purchased at the self-serve butcher and greengrocer shops. Just 5 minutes down the road is the town of Chexbres, home of several wine caveaux. There is also an 18-hole golf course, horsebackriding, and fishing in Lac de Bret.

The "greater Puidoux area" is the home of the Bout d'Brousse, an annual music festival with onsite food and camping. The music selection is surprisingly varied: the 2006 festival included Celtic rock, French chansons, and reggae.

== Politics ==
In the 2007 federal election the most popular party was the FDP which received 24.7% of the vote. The next three most popular parties were the SVP (21.49%), the SP (18.09%) and the Green Party (12.44%). In the federal election, a total of 641 votes were cast, and the voter turnout was 46.8%.

== Economy ==
As of 2010, Puidoux had an unemployment rate of 3.6%. As of 2008, there were 235 people employed in the primary economic sector and about 70 businesses involved in this sector. 482 people were employed in the secondary sector and there were 51 businesses in this sector. 934 people were employed in the tertiary sector, with 89 businesses in this sector. There were 1,291 residents of the municipality who were employed in some capacity, of which females made up 42.4% of the workforce.

In 2008 the total number of full-time equivalent jobs was 1,434. The number of jobs in the primary sector was 150, of which 149 were in agriculture and 1 was in forestry or lumber production. The number of jobs in the secondary sector was 460 of which 319 or (69.3%) were in manufacturing and 136 (29.6%) were in construction. The number of jobs in the tertiary sector was 824. In the tertiary sector; 365 or 44.3% were in wholesale or retail sales or the repair of motor vehicles, 187 or 22.7% were in the movement and storage of goods, 96 or 11.7% were in a hotel or restaurant, 26 or 3.2% were in the information industry, 9 or 1.1% were the insurance or financial industry, 33 or 4.0% were technical professionals or scientists, 31 or 3.8% were in education and 17 or 2.1% were in health care.

In 2000, there were 734 workers who commuted into the municipality and 845 workers who commuted away. The municipality is a net exporter of workers, with about 1.2 workers leaving the municipality for every one entering. About 1.1% of the workforce coming into Puidoux are coming from outside Switzerland. Of the working population, 14.1% used public transportation to get to work, and 60.3% used a private car.

== Religion ==
From the 2000 census, 602 or 25.7% were Roman Catholic, while 1,119 or 47.8% belonged to the Swiss Reformed Church. Of the rest of the population, there were 112 members of an Orthodox church (or about 4.79% of the population), there were 3 individuals (or about 0.13% of the population) who belonged to the Christian Catholic Church, and there were 54 individuals (or about 2.31% of the population) who belonged to another Christian church. There was 1 individual who was Jewish, and 68 (or about 2.91% of the population) who were Islamic. There was 1 person who was Buddhist, 1 person who was Hindu and 11 individuals who belonged to another church. 268 (or about 11.46% of the population) belonged to no church, are agnostic or atheist, and 122 individuals (or about 5.22% of the population) did not answer the question.

== Education ==
In Puidoux about 810 or (34.6%) of the population have completed non-mandatory upper secondary education, and 279 or (11.9%) have completed additional higher education (either university or a Fachhochschule). Of the 279 who completed tertiary schooling, 53.4% were Swiss men, 30.1% were Swiss women, 9.3% were non-Swiss men and 7.2% were non-Swiss women.

In the 2009/2010 school year there were a total of 305 students in the Puidoux school district. In the Vaud cantonal school system, two years of non-obligatory pre-school are provided by the political districts. During the school year, the political district provided pre-school care for a total of 665 children of which 232 children (34.9%) received subsidized pre-school care. The canton's primary school program requires students to attend for four years. There were 181 students in the municipal primary school program. The obligatory lower secondary school program lasts for six years and there were 120 students in those schools. There were also 4 students who were home schooled or attended another non-traditional school.

As of 2000, there were 84 students in Puidoux who came from another municipality, while 186 residents attended schools outside the municipality.

== Transportation ==
The municipality has two railway stations, Puidoux and Moreillon. Both are located on the Lausanne–Bern line and have regular service to Lausanne, Romont FR, and Vevey.
