= Puidoux railway station =

Railway station in Puidoux, Switzerland

Puidoux
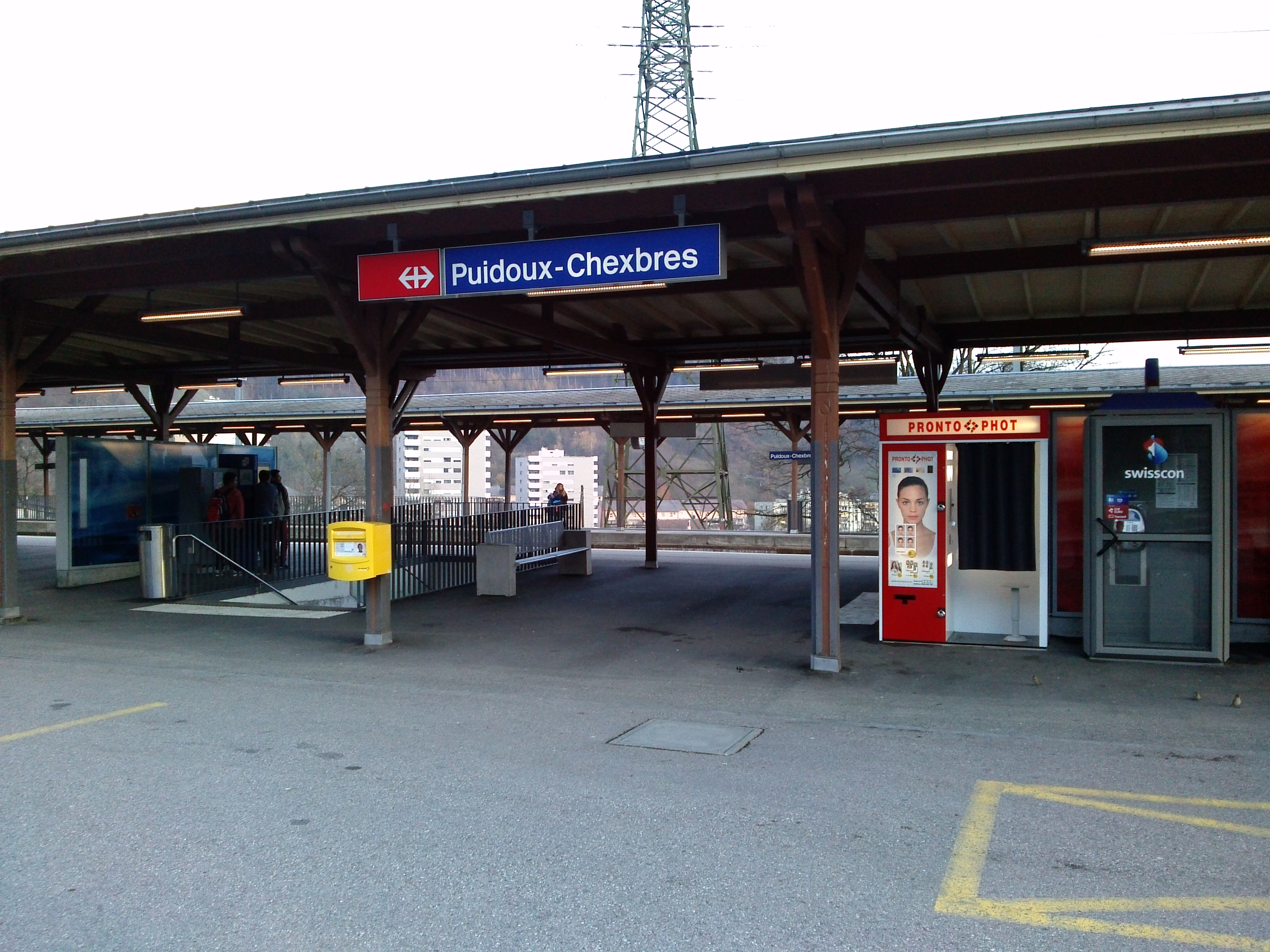
- The station platforms in 2013

General information
- Location: Puidoux; Switzerland
- Coordinates: 46°29′38″N 6°45′56″E
- Elevation: 617 m (2,024 ft)
- Owner: Swiss Federal Railways
- Lines: Lausanne–Bern line; Vevey–Chexbres line
- Distance: 12.1 km (7.5 mi) from Lausanne
- Platforms: 3: 1 island platform; 1 side platform
- Tracks: 4
- Train operators: Swiss Federal Railways
- Connections: CarPostal SA bus line

Construction
- Parking: Yes (100 spaces)
- Cycle facilities: Yes (20 spaces)
- Accessible: Yes

Other information
- Station code: 8504012 (PUI)
- Fare zone: 64 (mobilis)

History
- Former names: Puidoux-Chexbres (until 2018), Chexbres (before 1904)

Passengers
- 2023: 2'200 per weekday (SBB)

Services
Preceding station	RER Vaud	Following station
Grandvaux towards Lausanne	S40	Palézieux towards Fribourg/Freiburg
Grandvaux towards Lausanne	S41	Moreillon towards Fribourg/Freiburg
Chexbres-Village towards Vevey	R7	Palézieux Terminus
Lausanne towards Allaman	R8	Palézieux towards Payerne
Lausanne towards Allaman	R9	Palézieux towards Murten/Morat
Location

Puidoux railway station (French: Gare de Puidoux), also known as Puidoux-Chexbres railway station (until 2018), is a railway station in the municipality of Puidoux, in the Swiss canton of Vaud. It is an intermediate stop on the standard gauge Lausanne–Bern line and the western terminus of the Vevey–Chexbres line, both owned by Swiss Federal Railways.

Before Chexbres-Village railway station was opened nearby in 1904, it was known as Chexbres railway station.

== Services ==
As of the December 2024 timetable change, the following services stop at Puidoux:

- RER Vaud:
  - S40 / S41: half-hourly service between Lausanne and Fribourg/Freiburg.
  - R7: hourly service between Palézieux and Vevey.
  - R8 / R9: half-hourly service between Allaman and Payerne, with every other train continuing from Payerne to Murten/Morat.
