= Chailly (Switzerland) =

Neighbourhood in Lausanne, Switzerland

Coordinates: 46°31′36″N 6°38′57″E

Chailly is a neighbourhood in the city of Lausanne, Switzerland. Located in the north of the city, it is populated by many young people, and is rich in different cultures. It is also known for the École nouvelle de la Suisse romande, a private school of high reputation.

The place is the subject of a painting by French impressionist Frédéric Bazille (1841-1870), titled Landscape at Chailly.
