= Vevey–Montreux–Chillon–Villeneuve tramway =

Tramway line in Vaud, Switzerland

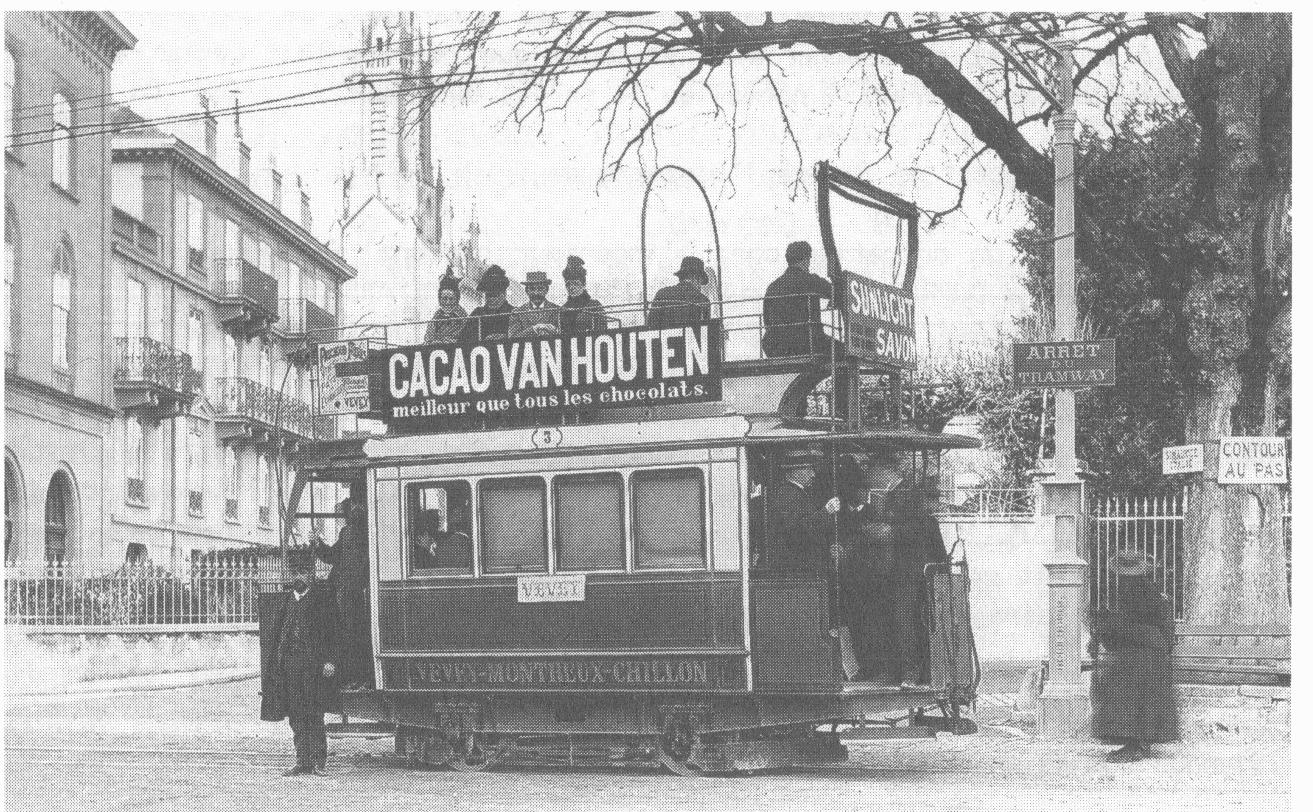
- A car of the VMC, circa 1890

Overview
- Status: Closed and removed
- Locale: Canton of Vaud, Switzerland
- Termini: Vevey; Villeneuve
- Stations: 62

Service
- Services: 1

History
- Opened: 1888
- Closed: 1958

Technical
- Line length: 13 kilometres (8.1 mi)
- Track gauge: Metre (3 ft 3 3/8 in)
- Minimum radius: 25 metres (82 ft)
- Electrification: 600 V, DC, overhead
- Maximum incline: 5%

The Vevey–Montreux–Chillon–Villeneuve tramway (VMCV) was a metre gauge electric tramway in the Swiss canton of Vaud. It linked the towns of Vevey, Montreux and Villeneuve close to the shoreline of Lake Geneva, and also served the famous Château de Chillon. The line was formed by a merger of the Vevey–Montreux–Chillon tramway (VMC) and the Chillon–Byron–Villeneuve tramway (CBV).

== Vevey–Montreux–Chillon ==
The Vevey–Montreux–Chillon tramway was opened in 1888, and was the first electric tramway in Switzerland. It used an early electrification method, with twin overhead copper tubes carrying both polarities. The current was collected by a trolley running on these tubes, and pulled by the tramcar. The cars were double-deck, with an open upper deck.

== Chillon–Byron–Villeneuve ==
The Chillon–Byron–Villeneuve tramway, effectively an extension of the earlier line but under separate ownership, opened in 1903. It used what had, by then, become the standard tram electrification method of a single overhead cable, with current return via the running rails. The two lines were merged to form the Vevey–Montreux–Chillon–Villeneuve tramway in 1913. The earlier line was rebuilt to use the later electrification method.

== Technical details ==
The merged line was single-track and street-running throughout, and was electrified at 600 V DC. It had a length of 13 kilometres (8.1 mi), with 62 stops, a maximum gradient of 5% and a minimum radius of 25 metres (82 ft). It shared a common section, of just 163 metres (535 ft) in length, with the Clarens–Chailly–Blonay tramway (CCB) in the Montreux suburb of Clarens.

== Closing and legacy ==
The tramway closed in 1958, and was replaced by the Vevey–Villeneuve trolleybus line. The owning company survived, and is now, under the name VMCV SA, the principal bus and trolleybus operator in the Vevey and Montreux area.

== See also ==
- Trolleybuses in Montreux/Vevey
