= Trolleybuses in Montreux/Vevey =

Swiss trolleybus system

Montreux/Vevey trolleybus system
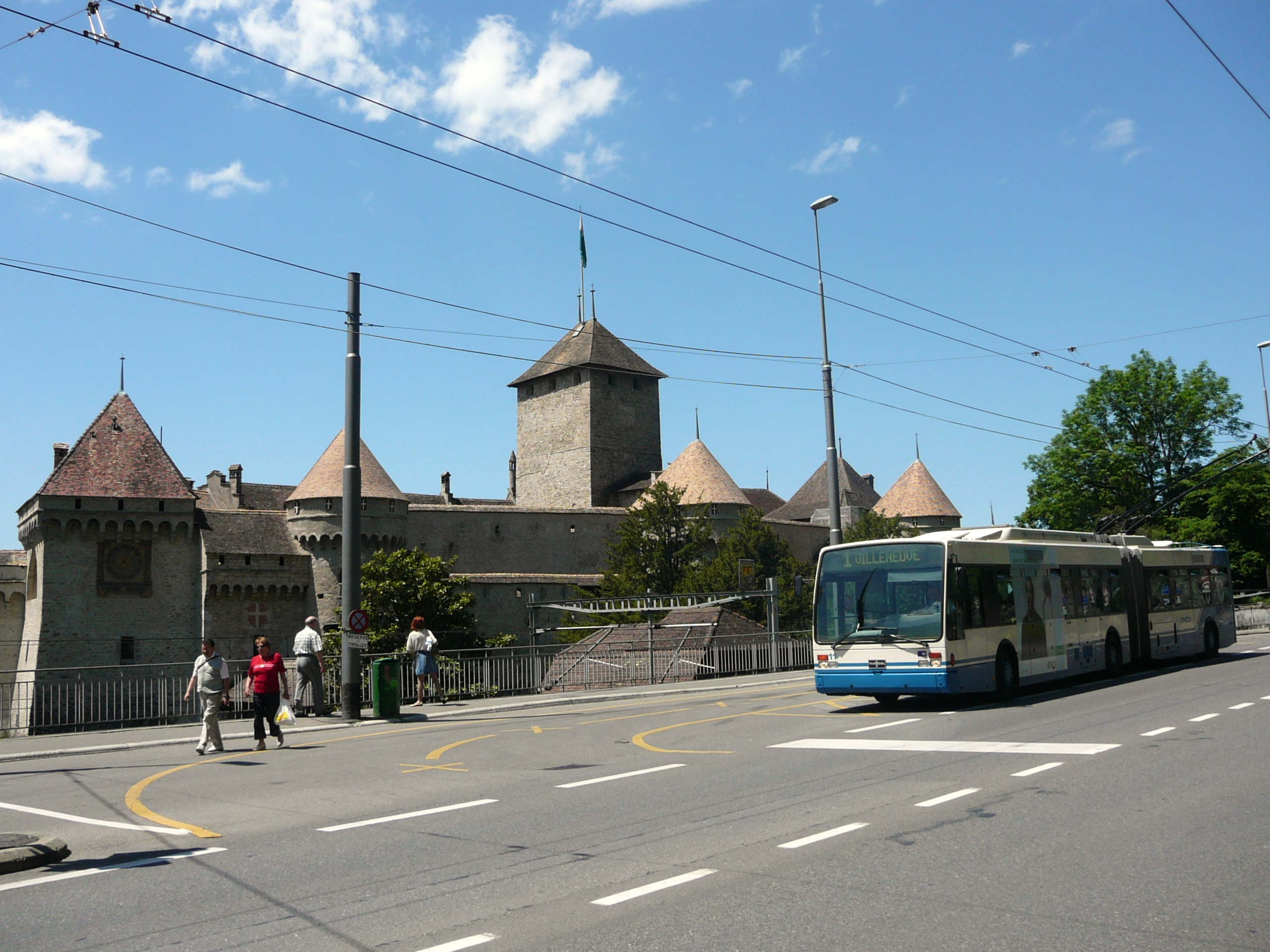
- Van Hool trolleybus in front of Chillon Castle

Operation
- Locale: Montreux and Vevey, Switzerland
- Open: 1957
- Status: Open
- Routes: 1
- Operator: VMCV

Infrastructure
- Electrification: 600 V DC

Statistics
- Route length: 12.8 km (8.0 mi)
Overview
- Website: http://www.vmcv.ch/ VMCV (in French)

The Montreux/Vevey trolleybus system (French: Réseau trolleybus de Montreux/Vevey), also known as the Vevey–Villeneuve trolleybus line, forms part of the public transport network in Montreux and Vevey, in the canton of Vaud, Switzerland. It comprises a single 12.75 km (7.92 mi) long trolleybus route along the length of the Riviera vaudoise (Vaud Riviera) on the north shore of Lake Geneva.

Opened in 1957, the line is designated as line 201 (prior to 11 December 2010, line 1) of the local bus network, operated by Transports publics Vevey-Montreux-Chillon-Villeneuve (VMCV). In addition to line 201, the VMCV runs eight motorbus lines. However, with 5,204,000 passengers annually, the trolleybus route is by far the busiest of all the operator's lines, and generates 74 percent of its total revenue.

The Vevey–Villeneuve trolleybus line is the last remaining of several interurban trolleybus lines that have existed in Switzerland. It largely follows Swiss main road no. 9, and passes through the municipalities of Vevey, La Tour-de-Peilz, Montreux, Veytaux and Villeneuve, and as of 2019 served a total of 41 stops.

== History ==
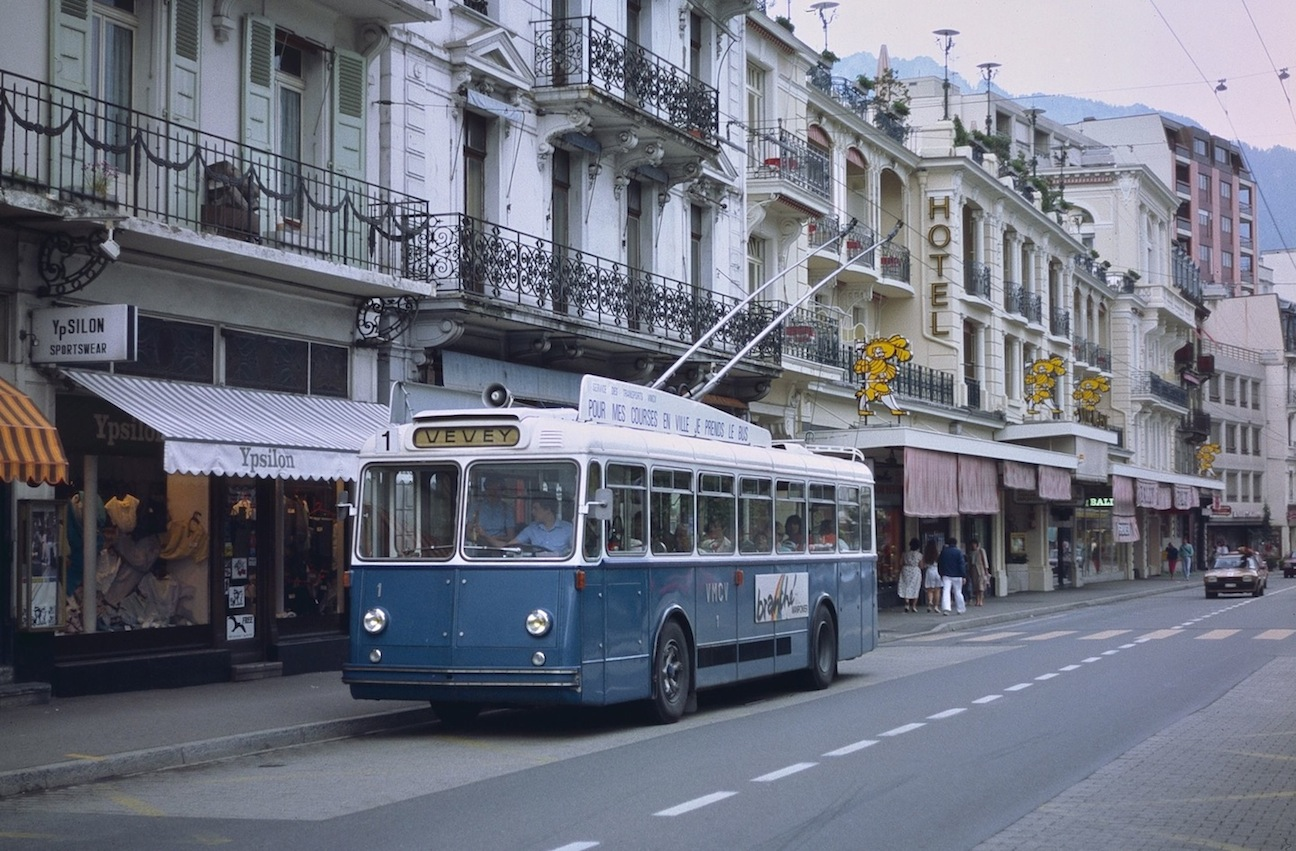
One of the original 1957 Berna trolleybuses in Montreux in 1985

The trolleybus line's ultimate predecessor, the Vevey–Montreux–Chillon tramway, opened in 1888, and was Switzerland's first electric tramway. The line was extended to Villeneuve in 1903, and became the Vevey–Montreux–Chillon–Villeneuve tramway in 1913. Plans to replace the tramway with a trolleybus line were first developed in 1938, but in view of the outbreak of World War II, the design work was discontinued.

It was only in 1955 that the construction of the trolleybus catenary was begun. The route went into operation in four sections as follows:

18 April 1957	Villeneuve Gare-Montreux Marché
19 July 1957	Montreux Marché–Clarens Dépôt
6 January 1958	Clarens Dépôt – Entre Deux Villes
1 April 1958	Entre Deux Villes – Vevey Funiculaire

Initially, the trolleybus service ran at a headway of 7.5 minutes, which compared favourably with the eight-minute headway of the trams. From 1966, six passenger trailers were available to augment the trolleybuses' capacity during rush hour.

Conductors were used to collect fares until 1976, an unusually late conversion to one-person operation for a Swiss transport system.

In the second half of the 1990s, the original overhead wires and the depot were fully renewed.

== Services ==
As of the 2010s, the travel time for the Vevey Funiculaire–Villeneuve Gare trip was 38 minutes, and the trip in the opposite direction took 37 minutes.

Nine trolleybus duties were required for the 10-minute clock-face schedule offered all day, allowing for a seven-minute turnaround in Vevey, and eight minutes in Villeneuve. During the Montreux Jazz Festival, which takes place in July, 12 vehicles operate a special, more frequent service. In the evenings, from approximately 8:00 pm, the headway becomes 20 minutes.

Prior to 12 December 2010, the VMCV offered an express bus service between Funiculaire Vevey and Montreux Marché every 20 minutes during peak times on the former line 1. This service stopped at only a few selected intermediate stops. The three extra duties were operated with rigid motorbuses, because only motorbuses could overtake the trolleybuses operating the regular services on that line. In the course of the integration of the VMCV into the Mobilis Vaud on 12 December 2010, the express bus service was withdrawn, not least because the trains on the Lausanne–Brig railway line running parallel to the trolleybus line could be used with the same ticket from that date.

=== 2019 extension ===
In the mid-2010s, planning was underway on a 2.5 km-long extension to Rennaz, at the eastern end of the trolleybus line. A large hospital with 300 beds and 1,000 employees was due to be built in Rennaz between 2013 and 2015, and a corresponding passenger potential for the trolleybus was anticipated. With the fleet already due for replacement (based on age) by 2020, VMCV decided to purchase new trolleybuses that were capable of operating on battery power for a portion of each trip, so that the service extension from Villeneuve to Rennaz would not require the construction of new overhead wires. A new fleet was ordered, but its delivery was late, so initially, on 1 September 2019, VMCV extended only a few trips to Rennaz and operated them with diesel buses. VMCV extended all trips on route 201 to Rennaz-Village from 15 December 2019, temporarily converting most trips to diesel buses but retaining a few short-working trips that still ended at Villeneuve and were operated by the older trolleybuses that still made up the entire active fleet at that time. The new battery-equipped ExquiCity trolleybuses began to enter service in January 2020, and by April 2020 enough of them had entered service that the majority of trips were again being operated by trolleybuses.

== Fleet ==
=== Original fleet ===
The system's original fleet consisted of 18 rigid trolleybuses, with fleet numbers 1 to 18. They were jointly developed by Berna and the Ateliers de Constructions Mécaniques de Vevey (ACMV), with electrical equipment by Société Anonyme des Ateliers de Sécheron (SAAS). VMCV also owned six passenger trailers, delivered in 1965–66 (or 1967), which the trolleybuses towed on busier trips. Numbered 51–56, they were built by locally based Rochat (of Denges) with bodies by Carroserie Moser (of Bern).

=== Second fleet ===
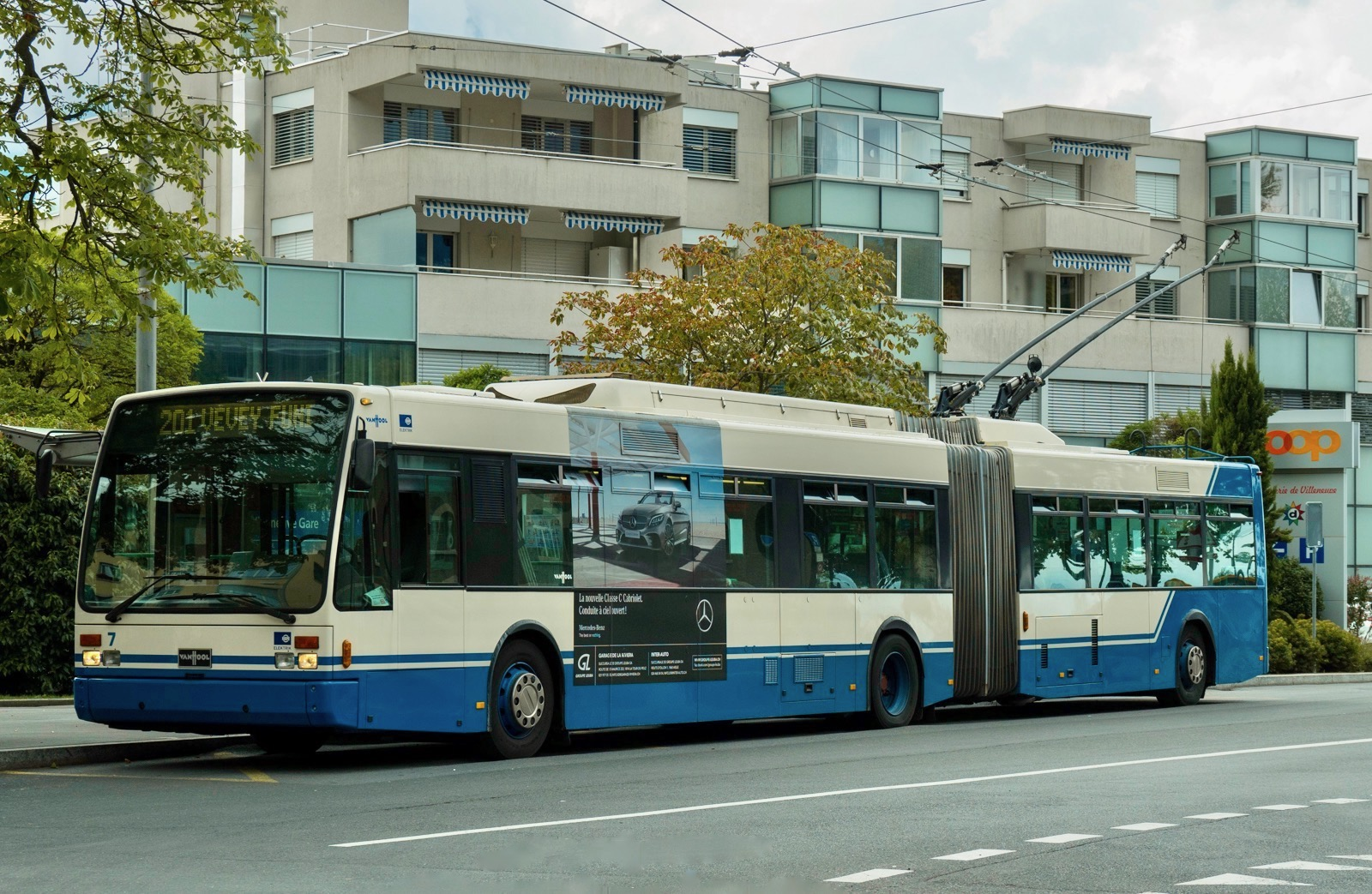
One of the Van Hool AG300T trolleybuses delivered in 1994–96, seen laying over at Villeneuve terminus in 2018

The original fleet was replaced in 1994–1995 by 18 new low-floor articulated trolleybuses built by the Belgian company Van Hool, with electrical equipment by Kiepe, with fleet numbers 1–18, the same number series as the original fleet. They entered service between 1994 and 1996. Upon the retirement of the original fleet, the Vevey–Villeneuve line became the first Swiss trolleybus system to be operated entirely by a low-floor fleet. The Van Hool trolleybuses were specially designed for the VMCV. Similar vehicles with the type designation AG300T were later supplied to the trolleybus systems in Esslingen am Neckar, Salzburg, Solingen and Arnhem.

By the mid-2000s, seven trolleybuses in the VMCV fleet were surplus to needs, and were placed in reserve, for use only as needed. In 2008, two other units from this series (nos. 2 and 15) were sold to the Salzburg trolleybus system. They were allocated fleet numbers 259 and 260 and repainted, and entered service in Salzburg in March 2009.

The VMCV also lent three vehicles from the reserve fleet to the neighbouring Lausanne trolleybus system between 2005 and 2007.

=== Current fleet ===
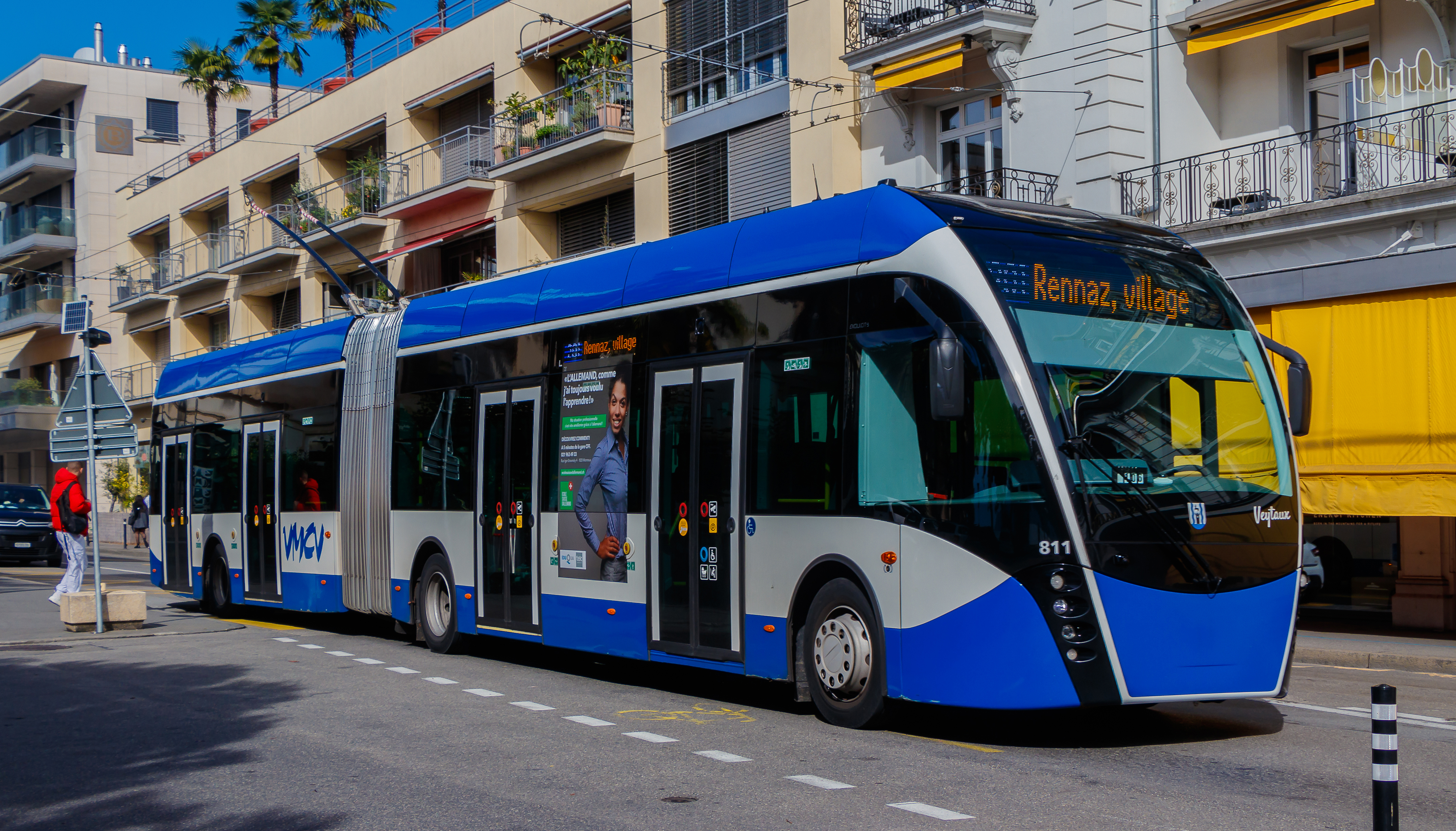
A Van Hool ExquiCity trolleybus in service in 2024

In 2017, VMCV placed an order for 16 Van Hool/Kiepe ExquiCity trolleybuses, to replace the existing fleet. These were to be equipped with the capability to operate on battery power as well as overhead wires, for operation on a planned 3 km extension to Rennaz that would not have trolley wires. They were allocated fleet numbers 801–816. The first unit to be delivered was No. 802, in November 2019. Six had been delivered by mid-January 2020, and they began to enter service on 20 January. By May 2020, all 16 had been delivered, by which time the last of the AG300T trolleybuses were withdrawn.

== See also ==
- List of trolleybus systems in Switzerland
- Vevey–Montreux–Chillon–Villeneuve tramway
