= Transports publics Vevey-Montreux-Chillon-Villeneuve =

VMCV - Transports publics Vevey-Montreux-Chillon-Villeneuve
- Industry: Transport
- Headquarters: Montreux, Switzerland
- Area served: Montreux and Vevey

The Transports publics Vevey-Montreux-Chillon-Villeneuve (VMCV) is a public transport operator in and around the Swiss towns of Montreux and Vevey. It operates the region's network of trolleybuses and motor buses.

The company is headquartered in Montreux. It was part of the Société électrique Vevey-Montreux (SEVM), a branch of Romande Energie, until ownership was transferred to the municipalities of Vevey and Montreux in 2008.

== See also ==
- Trolleybuses in Montreux/Vevey
- Vevey–Montreux–Chillon–Villeneuve tramway
