= Montreux–Glion–Rochers-de-Naye railway line =

Narrow gauge railway line in Switzerland

Coordinates: 46°25′40.93″N 6°55′25.33″E

Montreux–Glion–Rochers-de-Naye
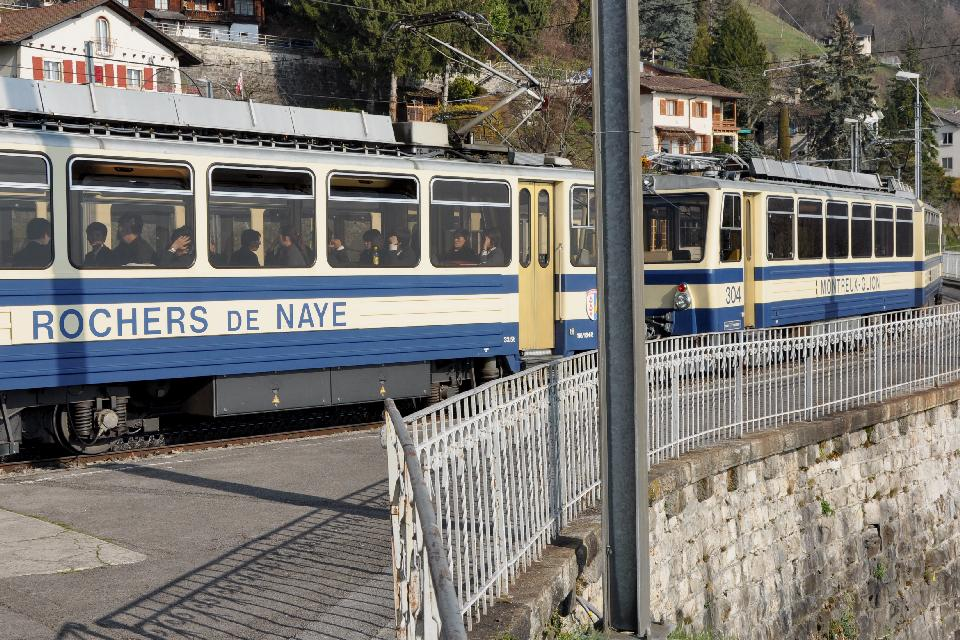
- Double-headed motor coaches Bhe 4/8 301 and 304 at Glion

Overview
- Status: Open
- Owner: Transports Montreux-Vevey-Riviera
- Locale: Canton of Vaud, Switzerland
- Termini: Montreux; Rochers de Naye

Service
- Type: Rack railway

History
- Opened: Glion–Rochers-de-Naye 1892; Montreux-Glion 1909

Technical
- Line length: 10.3 km (6.4 mi)
- Rack system: Abt
- Track gauge: 800 mm (2 ft 7 1/2 in)
- Electrification: 1000 V, DC, overhead line
- Highest elevation: 1,970 m (6,463 ft)
- Maximum incline: 22%

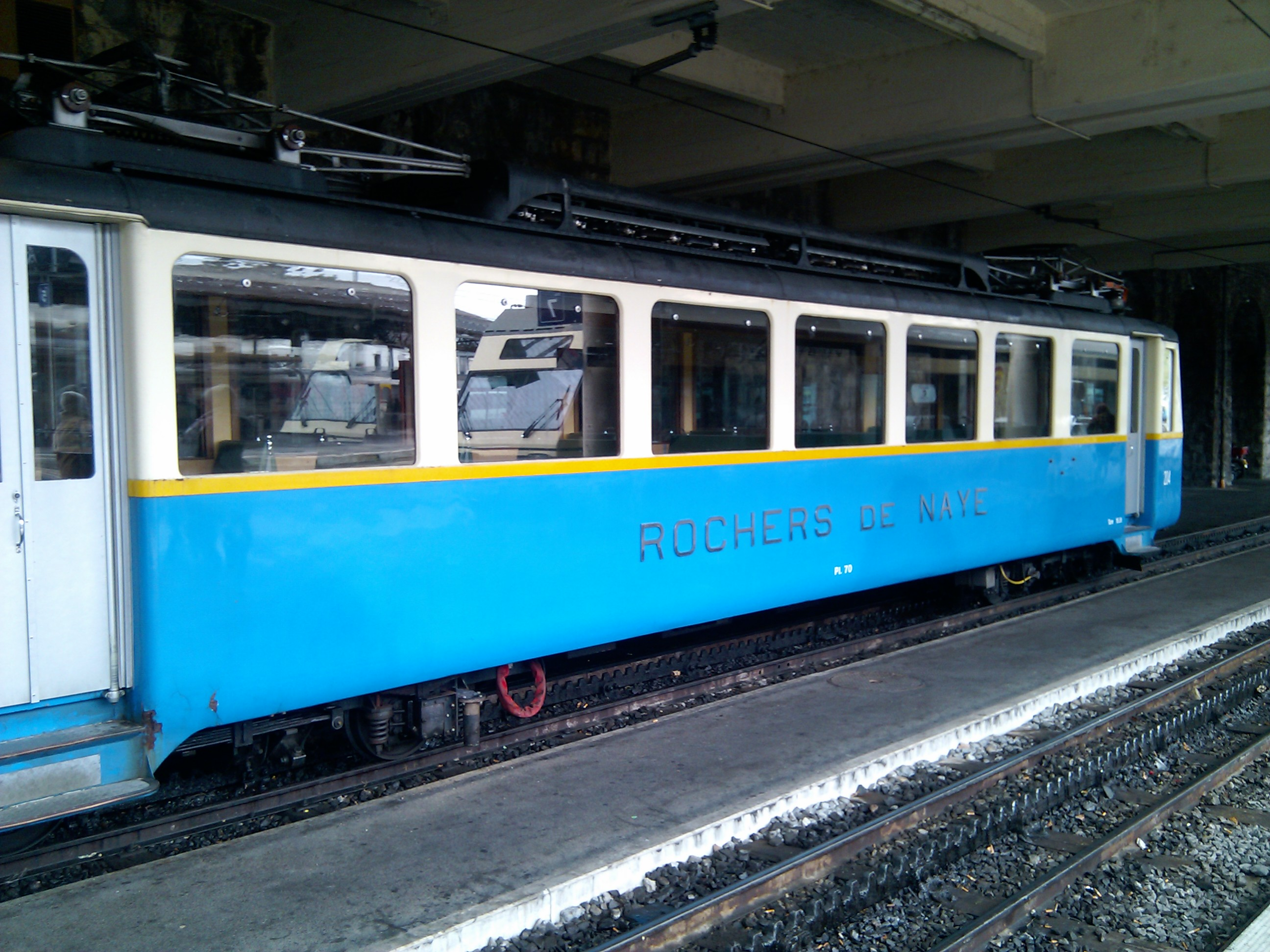
A train in the Rochers-de-Naye platforms at Montreux station

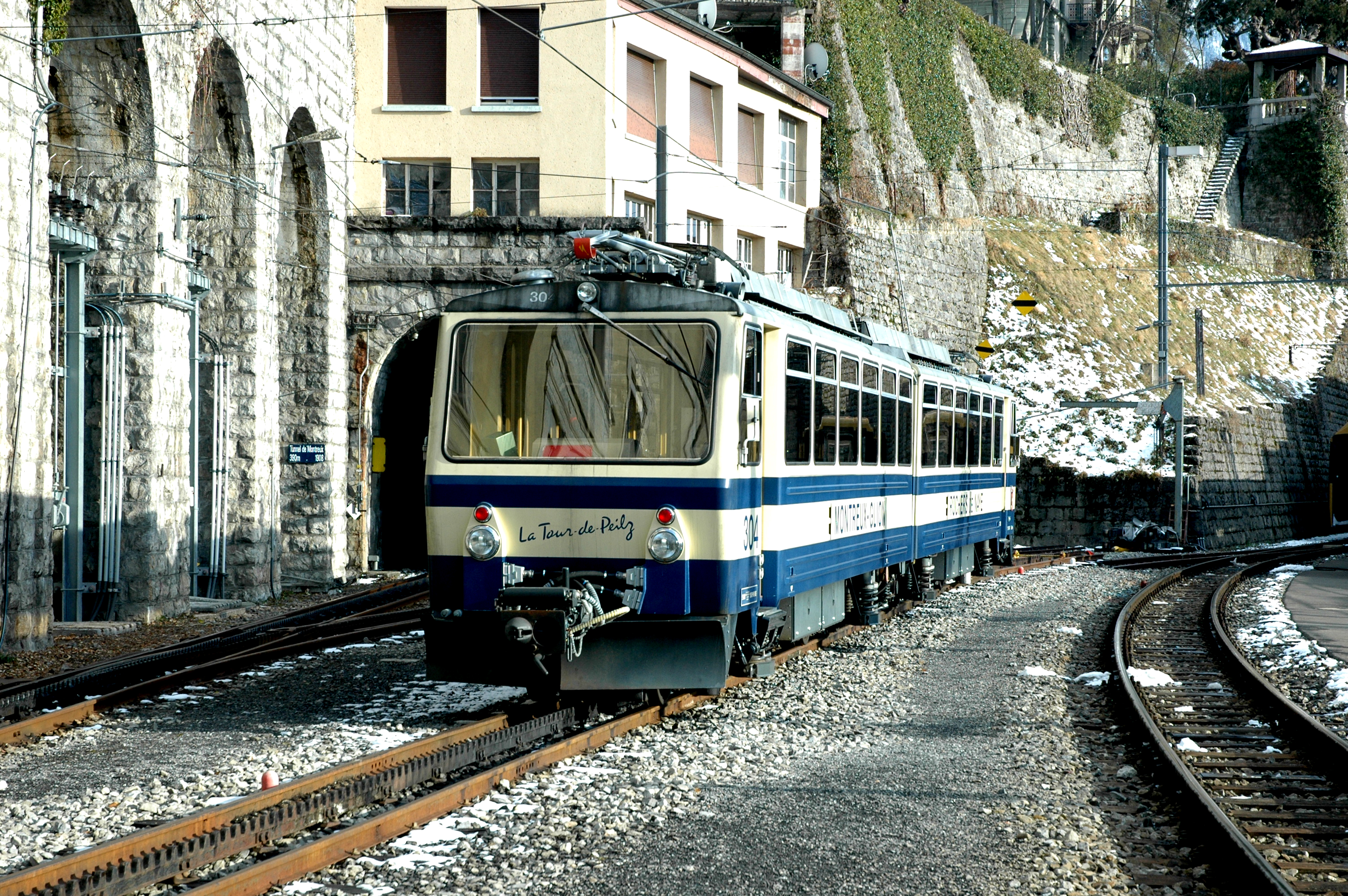
A Rochers-de-Naye train in a siding at Montreux; the running line enters the tunnel to the left of the train; the line on the right belongs to the Montreux–Lenk im Simmental line

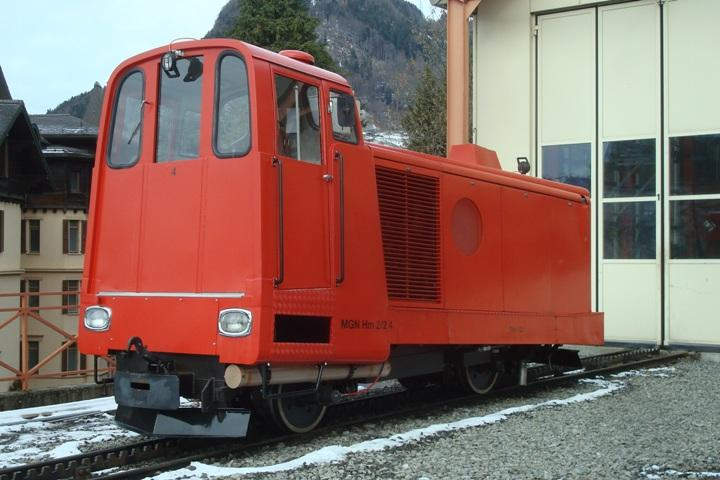
MTGN No.4, the line's diesel locomotive at Glion

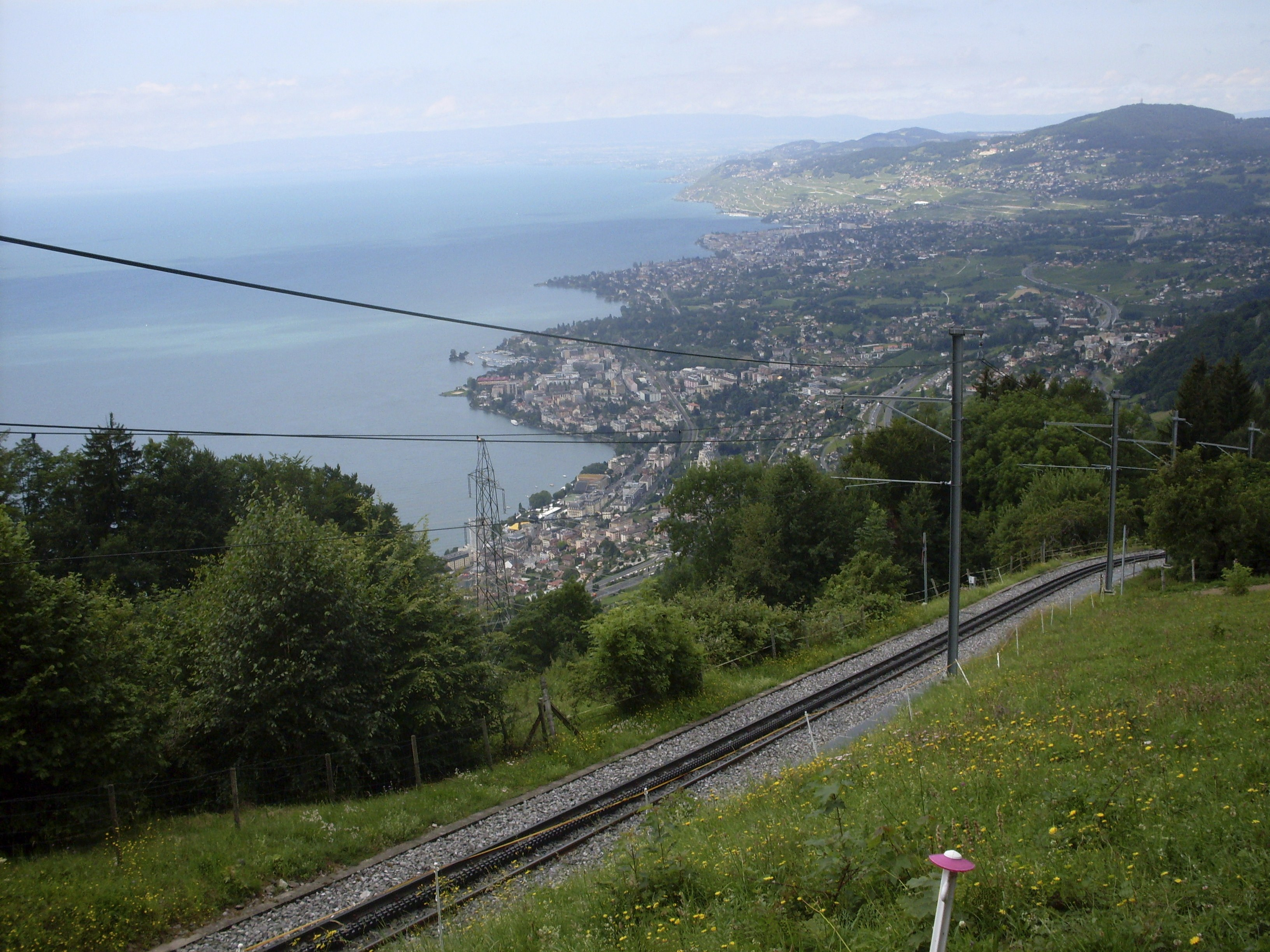
The line between Glion and Caux

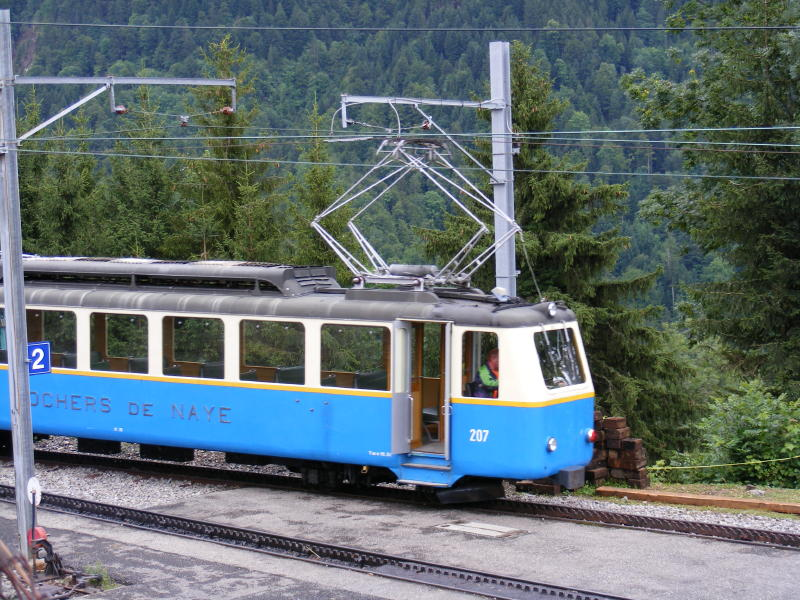
A train on the Montreux-Rochers de Naye line at Caux

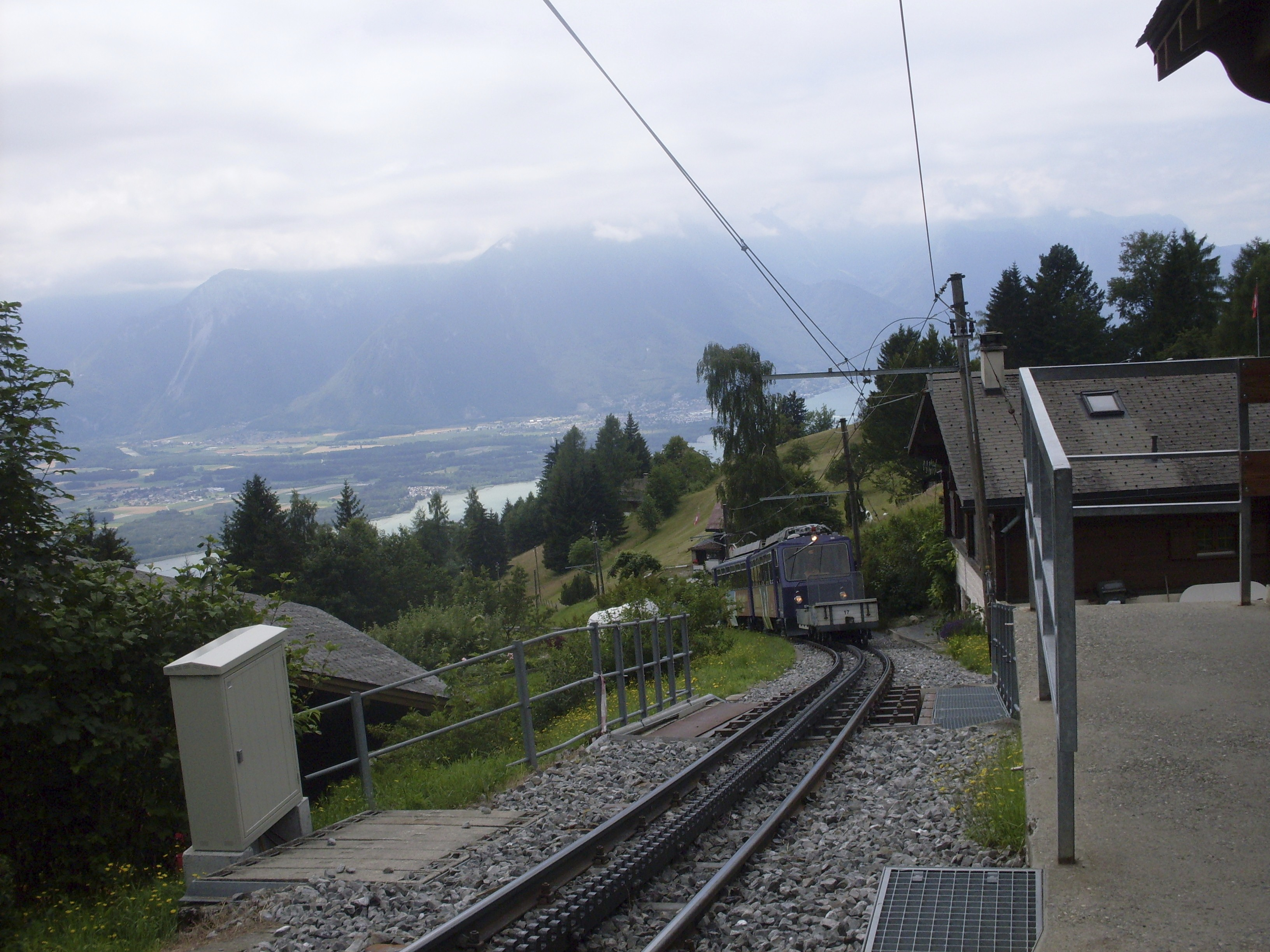
Train approaching the Haut de Caux stop, with Lake Geneva and the French Alps behind

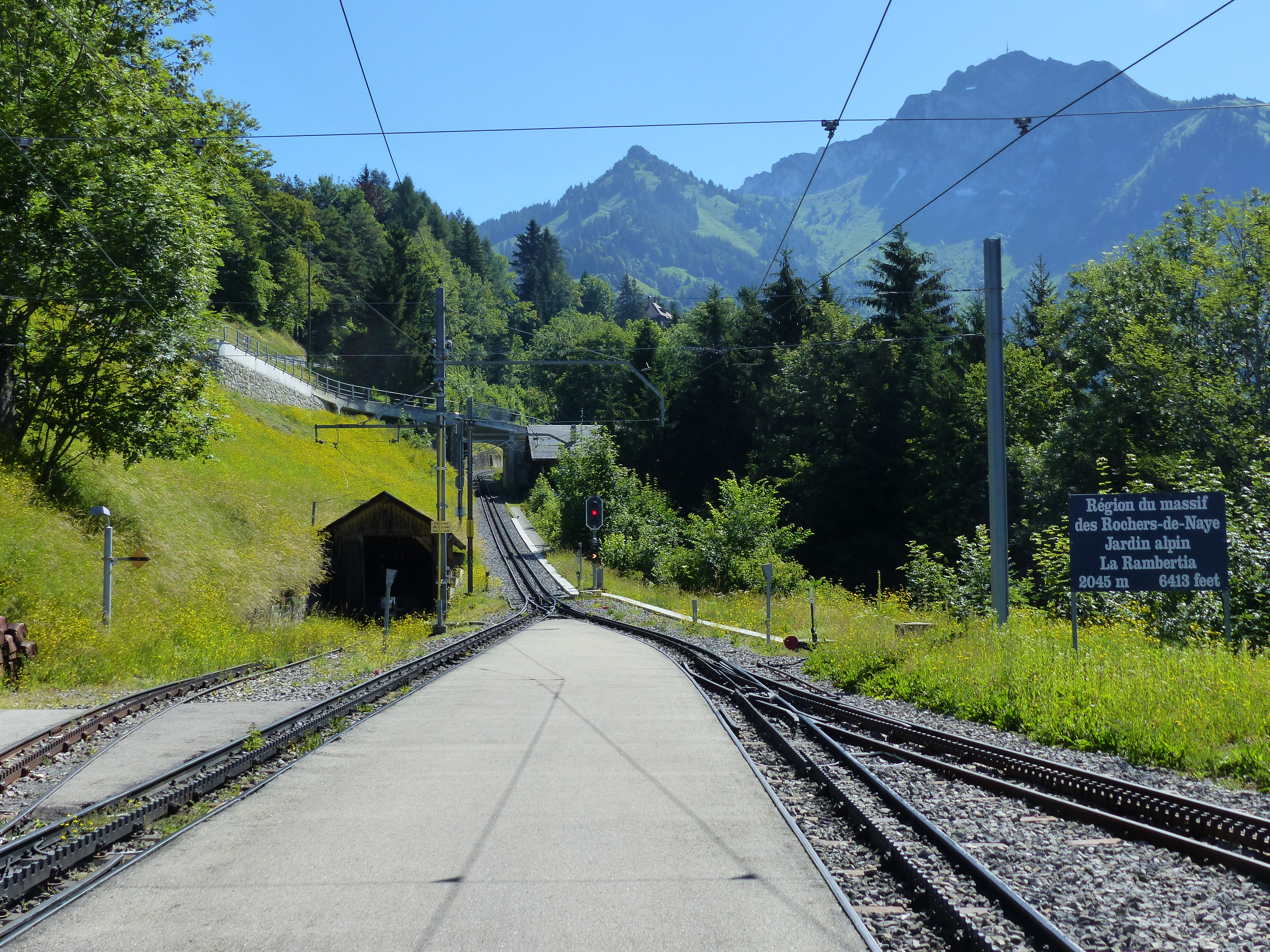
Caux station with Rochers de Naye

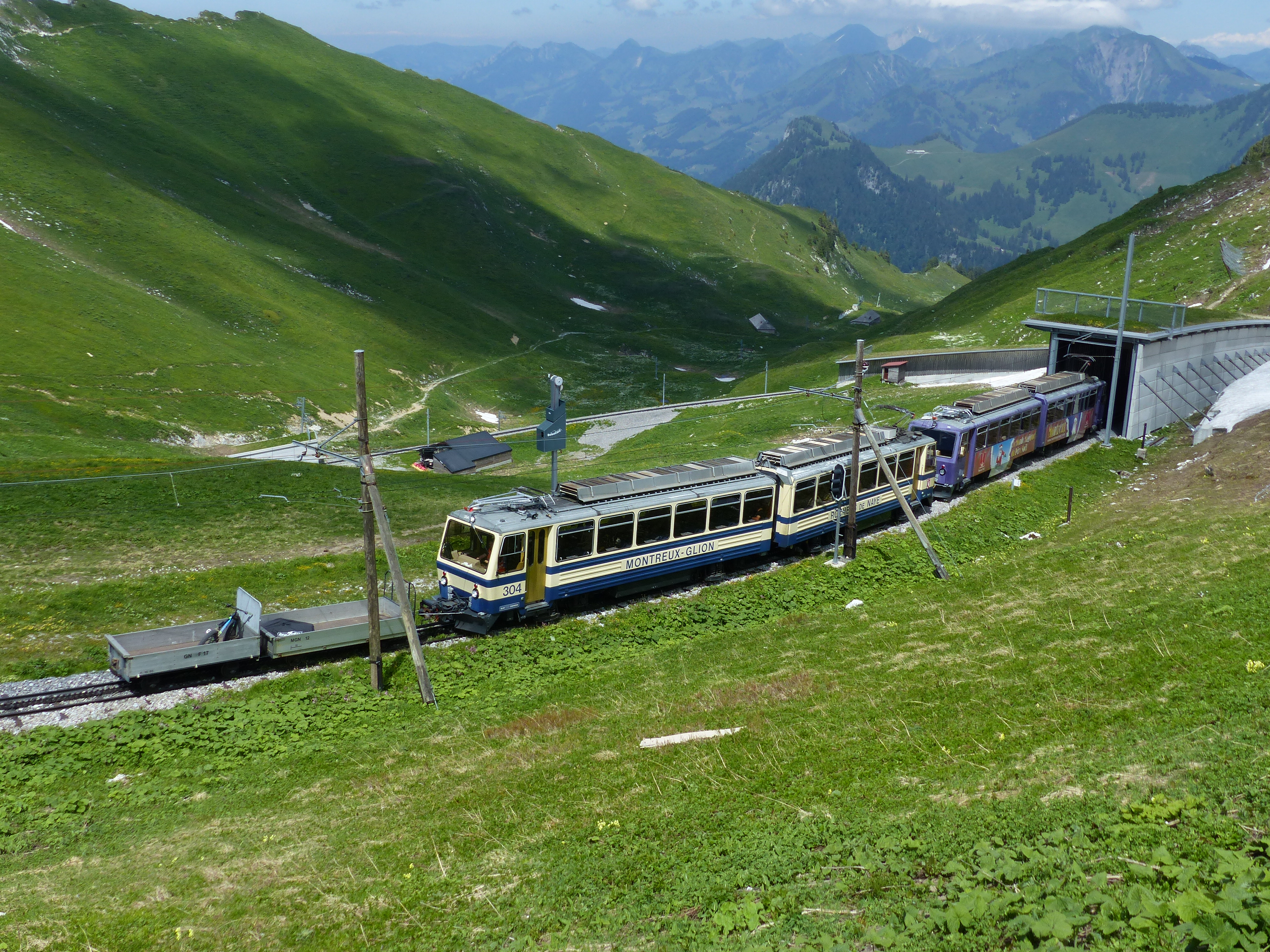
A train approaching the summit

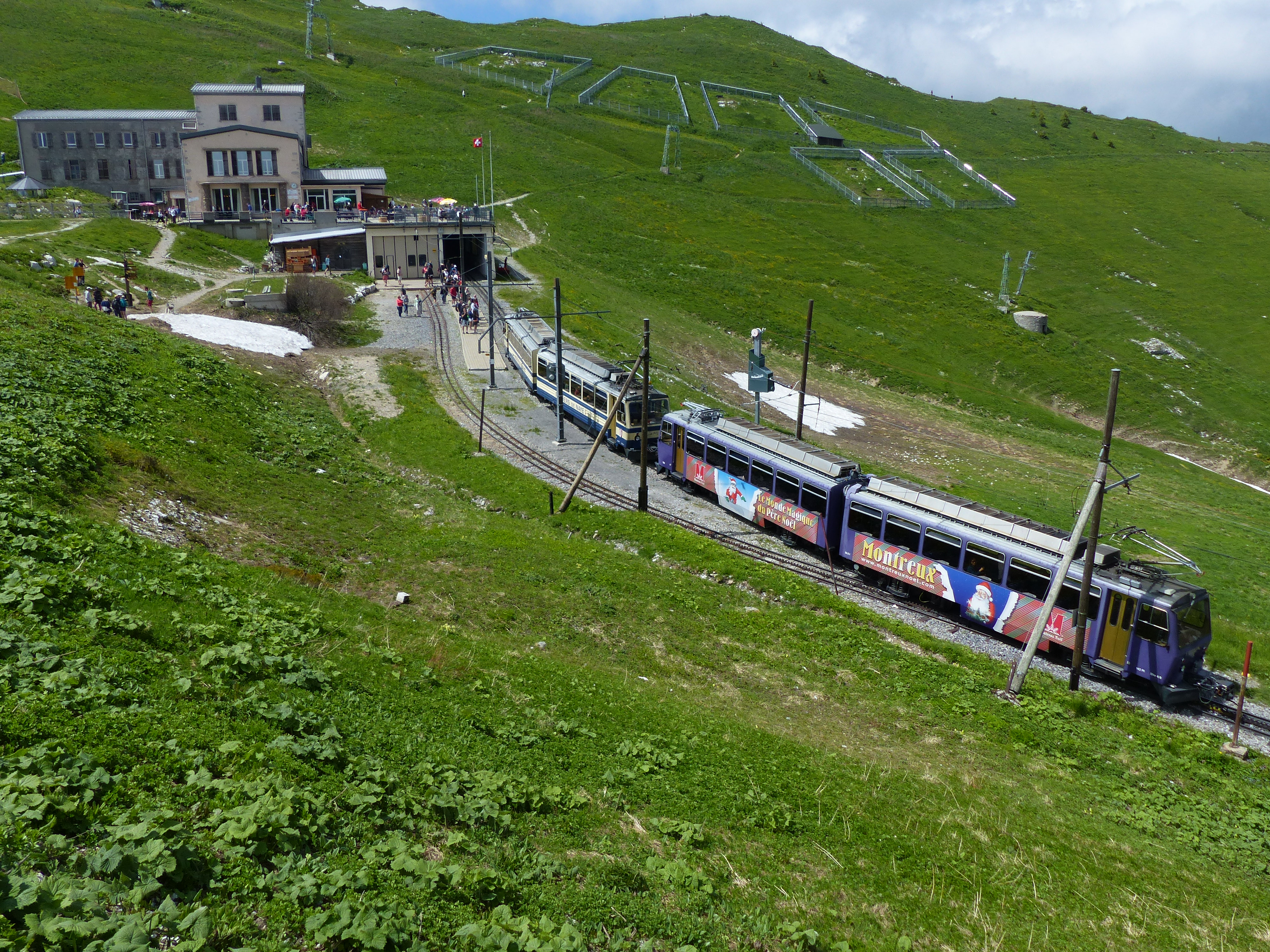
The summit station

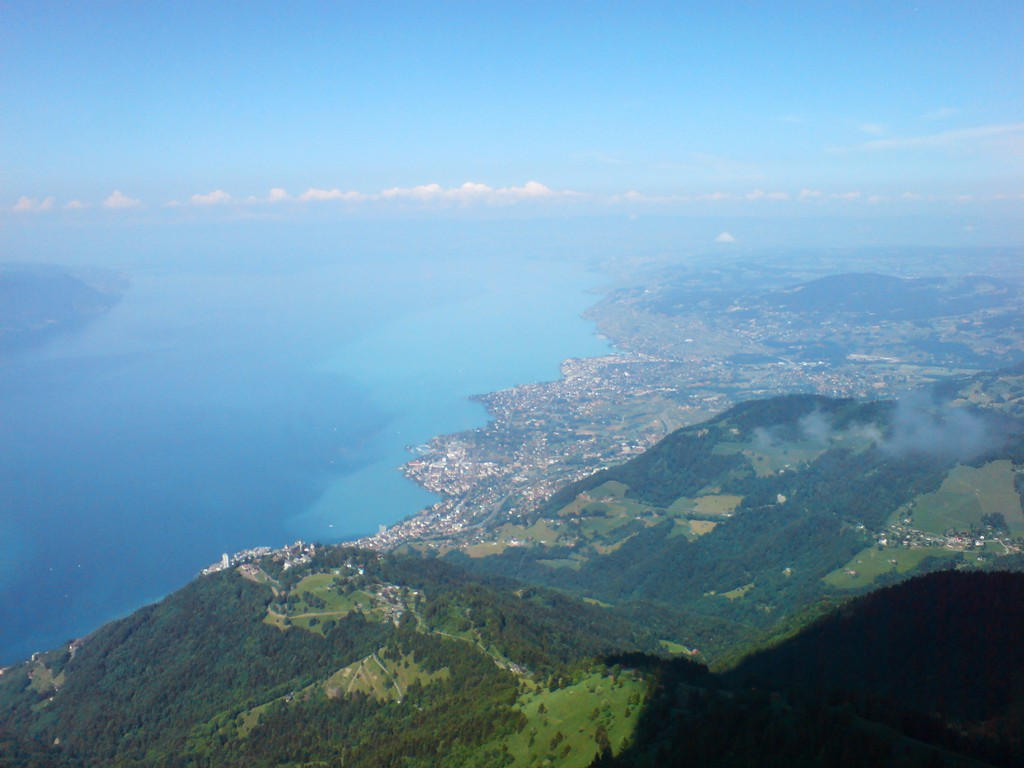
The view from the summit

The Montreux–Glion–Rochers-de-Naye railway line is an electrically operated rack railway in Switzerland with a track gauge of 800 mm (2 ft 7 1/2 in). The line connects the resort of Montreux, on the shores of Lake Geneva, with the summit of the Rochers de Naye mountain. The line operates via the village of Glion, on the mountainside above Montreux, where it connects with the Territet–Glion funicular.

The line was originally built as two separate lines by two different companies, the Chemin de fer Glion–Rochers-de-Naye (GN) and the Chemin de fer Montreux–Glion (MGI). Today, the line is owned and operated by Transports Montreux–Vevey–Riviera.

Since 2017, the line is operated with original Belle Epoque carriages preserved and restored by the company Montreux-Oberland Bernois (MOB).

== History ==
=== Glion to Rochers-de-Naye ===
The first section of the line to open was the Glion to Rochers-de-Naye railway, which was built by the Chemin de fer Glion–Rochers-de-Naye company (GN), and opened in 1892. Initially Glion was reached by the Territet–Glion funicular, which departed from a lower terminus opposite Territet station, the first station east of Montreux station on the Simplon railway.

The Glion to Rochers-de-Naye railway was built to a gauge of 800 mm (2 ft 7 1/2 in), and the line was operated by steam locomotives using the rack and pinion system devised by Roman Abt.

=== Montreux to Glion ===
In 1909, the Montreux to Glion railway opened, built by the Chemin de fer Montreux-Glion company (MGl). This ran from a lower terminus within Montreux station, and at its upper end made an end-to-end junction with the Glion to Rochers-de-Naye line. A cross-platform interchange was retained between both lines and the Territet-Glion funicular.

The Montreux to Glion railway was built to the same gauge and rack system as the Glion to Rochers-de-Naye railway, but was electrically operated from the start. Until 1938, when the Glion to Rochers-de-Naye line was electrified, trains were handed over in Glion between electric and steam locomotives. At the same time, electric railcars took over most services, leaving freight and peak traffic, service trains and snow blowing to the electric locomotives.

=== Merger ===
Even after through railcars took over most services, the two lines remained the property of different companies. The two companies finally merged in 1987, to form the Chemin de fer de Montreux–Glion–Rochers-de-Naye company (MGN). In 1992 this company merged with the Territet-Glion funicular to form the Chemin de fer Montreux–Territet–Glion–Rochers-de-Naye company (MTGN).

In 2001, the MTGN was merged into Transports Montreux-Vevey-Riviera (MVR), a company that operates a number of railway lines in the Montreux area. It is marketed under the Golden Pass Services banner.

=== Closures ===
In May 2008 the Montreux to Glion section of the line was closed so that work on the lining of the Tunnel de Valmont could be carried out. It reopened on schedule on 2 June ready for the summer season. During this closure the Glion to Caux and Rochers de Naye section had operated normally with the Montreux to Glion section being covered by a replacement bus service.

== Route ==
The railway from Montreux, which departs from platform 8 of the main line Montreux railway station, begins to climb steeply almost as soon as it leaves the station and enters the first of many tunnels. The line changes direction by a series of minimum radius curves, views of Lake Geneva alternating from side to side, before reaching the station at Glion. The workshops and depot are alongside the line as it leaves Glion, the main shops accessed from a traverser set off a loop line alongside the main line.

The line continues higher to the small village of Caux passing through Alpine meadows which, in the Springtime, are full of wild growing narcissus, forget-me-nots and others, before reaching its upper terminus at Rochers-de-Naye. From here there are views over Lake Geneva and across to the French Alps.

The line is 10.36 km (6.4 mi) long and has a vertical climb of 1,575 m (5,167 ft). This is made up of the Montreux - Glion section, which climbs 292 m (958.0 ft) in 2.73 km (1.7 mi), whilst the Glion - Rochers-de-Naye climbs 1,283 m (4,209 ft) in 7.63 km (4.7 mi).

The line uses track of 800 mm (2 ft 7 1/2 in) gauge and the rack and pinion system devised by Roman Abt. It is electrified using 1000 V DC supplied by overhead lines. Passing loops are situated in the stations at Glion, Caux, Paccot and Jaman.

== Rolling stock ==
=== Locomotives ===
No.	Name	Class	Builders details	Date Built	Notes.
1		HGe 2/2	SLM/BBC/MFO	1909	Lost in Avalanche in 1966.
1		H 2/3	SLM	1992	Sold to BRB 2005, becoming their No.16.
2		HGe 2/2	SLM/BBC/MFO	1909	Fitted with a new "old style" wider body in 1986.
3	Veytaux (e)	HGe 2/2	SLM/BBC/MFO	1909	Received new modern body in 1976, renumbered 101. In 1998 returned to No.3. Semi-permanently coupled to snowplough. Destroyed in accident in 2011.
4	Brienz	Hm 2/2	Buhler/Caterpillar	1973	New to BRB as No.8, sold to MGN in 1996. Overhauled at Chernex in 2009 with fitting of larger engine bonnet and repaint in bright red livery.
11		Hem 2/2	Stadler	2013	Delivered December 2013.Multiple working fitted to work with No.12. Bright red livery
12		Hem 2/2	Stadler	2013	Delivered December 2013.Multiple working fitted to work with No.11. Bright red livery

=== Railcars ===
No.	Name	Class	Builders details	Date Built	Notes.
201		Bhe 2/4	SLM/BBC	1939	ex ABhe 2/4, Scrapped March 2011
202		Bhe 2/4	SLM/BBC	1939	ex ABhe 2/4, Scrapped April 2007
203		Bhe 2/4	SLM/BBC	1939	ex ABhe 2/4 Restored August 2023
204		Bhe 2/4	SLM/BBC	1939	ex ABhe 2/4 Scrapped April 2021
205		Bhe 2/4	SLM/BBC	1939	ex ABhe 2/4, Scrapped April 2007
206		Bhe 2/4	SLM/BBC	1949	ex ABhe 2/4, Scrapped July 2000
207		Bhe 2/4	SLM/BBC	1949	ex ABeh 2/4 Scrapped November 2023
208		Bhe 2/4	SLM/BBC	1966	ex ABhe 2/4, Scrapped April 2007
301	Montreux	Bhe 4/8	SLM/Siemens	1983	(b)
302	Veytaux (e)	Bhe 4/8	SLM/Siemens	1983	(b)(c)
303	Villeneuve	Bhe 4/8	SLM/Siemens	1983	(b)(d)
304	La Tour de Peilz	Bhe 4/8	SLM/Siemens	1992	(b)
305		Bhe 4/8	MOB Chernex / Siemens	2010	(b)(f) Delivered to traffic w/c 30.11.10

Abbreviations.

- (b) Fitted for multiple unit with two or three double headed motor coaches serie Bhe 4/8 301-305.
- (c) Carries "Marmot Paradis" livery
- (d) Carries "Pere Noel" livery, (marking the visit of Santa to Rochers de Naye).
- (e) No.302 carries "Veytaux" nameplate low down on cab side on front (uphill) cab. Name removed from locomotive No.3 which is now unnamed.
- (f) Painted in new "Golden Pass" gold/white livery from new.
- BBC : Brown, Boveri & Cie
- SLM : Swiss Locomotive and Machine Works, Winterthur
- MFO : Maschinenfabrik Oerlikon

=== Rotary Snowplow ===
No.	Name	Class	Builders details	Date Built	Notes.
3		Xrote	RACO/MFO/Beilhack	1954	Electric rotary snowplough
4		Xrote		2013	Electric rotary snowplough

=== Preserved Coaches ===
Previous Company	No.	Class	Builders details	Seats	Date Built	Notes.
Montreux-Glion	2	BC	Luzern, Company not known	56 in 7 comp.	1908	Built for the opening of the line
Montreux-Glion					1908	Built for the opening of the line
Glion-Rochers de Naye	16	BC				

- Coaches of the Montreux-Glion Railway are restored to original red livery, usually kept at Glion and work with Locomotive No.2. During its time at the line also worked with steam locomotive No.1.
- Coach No.16 is painted a dark blue livery with lighter blue panels. Also worked with steam locomotive No.1.

== Services ==
The line operates throughout the year, and provides an hourly service in each direction between Montreux and Rochers de Naye from around 09:00 to dusk. Additional services between Montreux and Caux operate in the early morning, in the evenings, and during peak periods. The trains are timed to offer connections at Montreux with main line services of the Swiss Federal Railways and the Montreux–Lenk im Simmental line.

== See also ==
- List of mountain railways in Switzerland
- List of heritage railways and funiculars in Switzerland
