= Funiculaire Territet–Mont Fleuri =

Former funicular railway in Montreux, Switzerland

Funiculaire Territet–MontFleuri
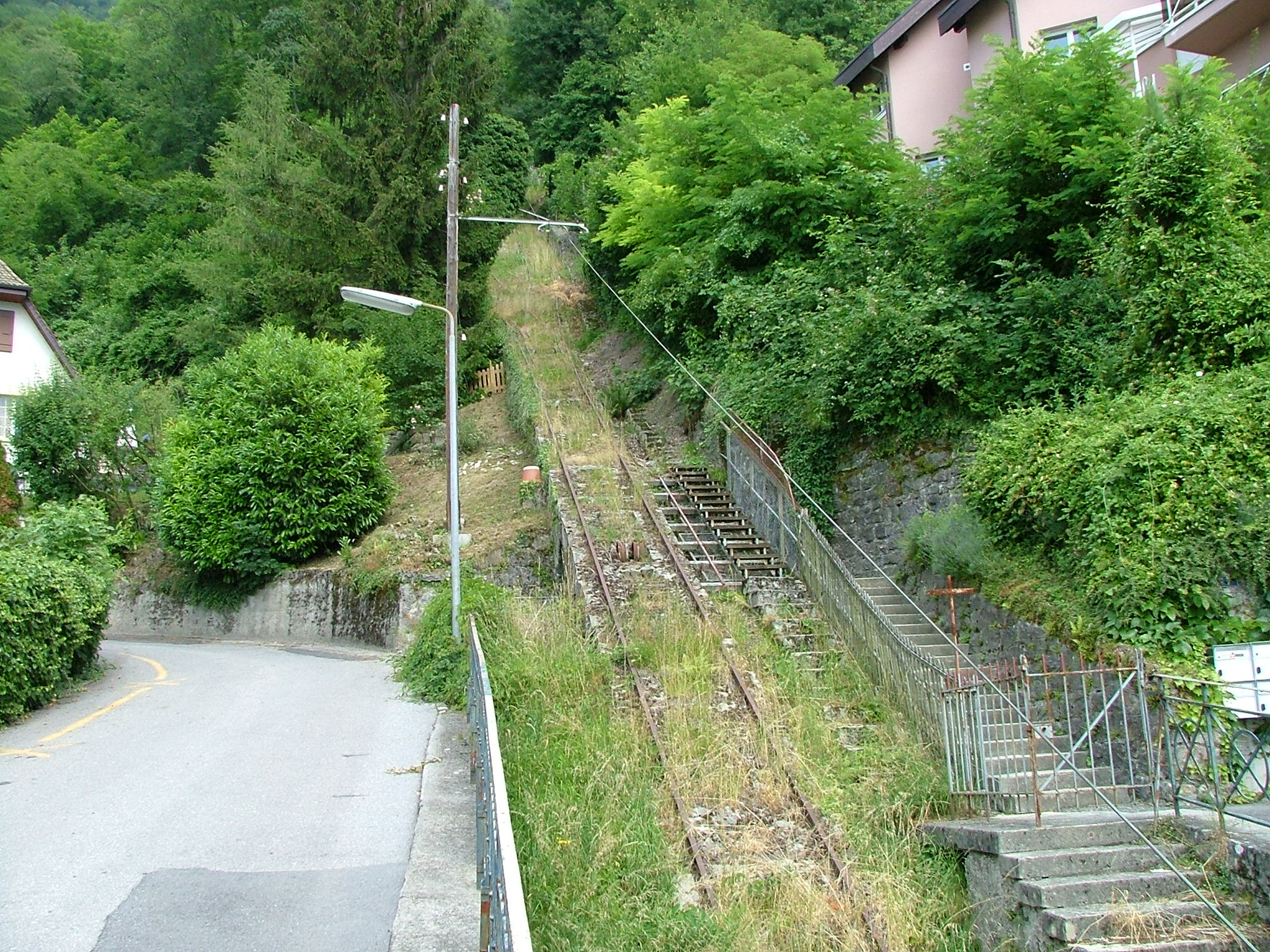
- abandoned tracks (2006)

Overview
- Other name(s): Chemin de fer Territet – Mont-Fleuri
- Status: Ceased operation
- Owner: Compagnie du chemin de fer Territet-Mont-Fleuri
- Locale: Montreux, Canton of Vaud, Switzerland
- Termini: Territet TMF; Mont Fleuri TMF
- Stations: 6 or 7

Service
- Type: Funicular
- Route number: (1053)
- Operator(s): Compagnie du chemin de fer Territet-Mont-Fleuri (1910-1992)
- Rolling stock: 2 for 36 persons each

History
- Opened: 30 September 1910
- Closed: 4 November 1992

Technical
- Line length: 430 m (1,410 ft)
- Number of tracks: 1 with passing loop
- Highest elevation: 577 m (1,893 ft)

Funiculaire Territet–Mont Fleuri was a funicular railway in Montreux, Switzerland. The line led from Territet on Lake Geneva at 392 m to Hotel Mont Fleuri at 577 m. The line with a length of 430 m had a difference in altitude of 185 m. The funicular with two cars had a single track with a passing loop. Its lower part was located in a tunnel.

The lower station was located next to Territet railway station of the Simplon line and the Territet-Glion funicular line. The line had several intermediate stations, such as Collonge, Le Clos, Cotterd-Le Flon, Sur Cotterd.

The line was opened in 1910.

The hotel closed in 1987 and was transformed into a boarding school. Operations were stopped on 4 November 1992.

The line was operated and is owned by Compagnie du chemin de fer Territet-Mont-Fleuri. The city of Montreux is the main shareholder (as of 2020).

In May 2020, after several studies about a possible reopening, the city announced a competition to reuse the site and remaining installations of the funicular. The winning projects were announced by June 2021. In December 2022, it wasn't decided whether the winning project would actually be implemented.
