= Territet =

Territet (Montreux)
- Municipality
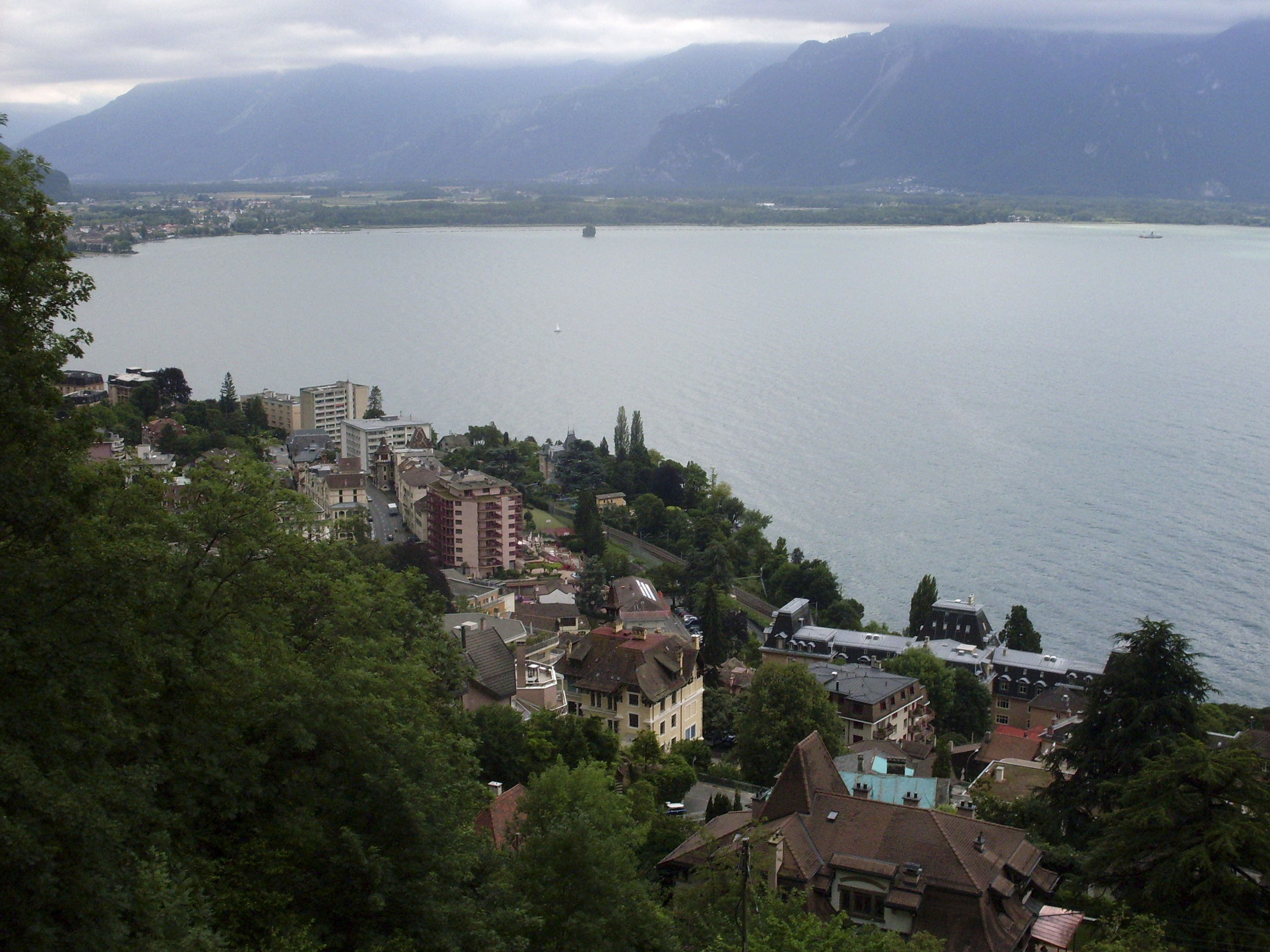
- Location of Territet (Montreux)
- Location within Switzerland Location within Canton of Vaud
- Coordinates: 46°25′N 6°55′E
- Country: Switzerland
- Canton: Vaud
- District: Riviera-Pays-d'Enhaut
- Elevation: 400 m (1,300 ft)
- Time zone: UTC+01:00 (CET)
  - Summer (DST): UTC+02:00 (CEST)
- ISO 3166 code: CH-VD
- Website: http://www.territet.ch Profile (in French),

Territet (Montreux) is a locality which is part of the Montreux commune, in the Vaud canton, Switzerland.

== Geography ==
Aerial view (1968)

Territet is located between the city center of Montreux and the village of Veytaux, within the municipality of Montreux, on the lake Geneva shore.

== History ==
Territet unites several formerly separate hamlets. While the lower part (below the main road) was always called Territet, there were two other localities on the higher ground called Collonge and la Veraye.

While the very first hotel of the region was opened in neighbouring Veytaux in 1829, other hotels were soon built in Territet, like the "Chasseur des Alpes" in 1840 which became in 1855 the Hôtel des Alpes-Grand Hôtel. The current Montreux city centre consisting of rich farmland was developed only later, which is why the Orient Express train would stop in the Territet station and not in Montreux. Foreign tourists started to stay in Territet from 1848 onwards and their numbers picked up from 1861 when the train station was opened. A number of VIPs visited Territet in the following years, among whom emperor Franz Joseph I of Austria in 1893 and his wife Empress Elisabeth of Austria (Empress Sissi) who came on her own four times.

In 1879 the first phone in Switzerland was installed in Territet. Territet also had the first tennis court in Switzerland. It was created in 1894, exclusively for the use of the English tourists (Swiss or other nationalities weren't allowed to access this tennis court!). The Territet–Glion funicular railway, one of the oldest in Switzerland, was opened in 1883.

In 1931 representatives of two branches of exiled Spanish Borbons signed in Territet a draft agreement, intended to mend the dynastic feud; named Pact of Territet, it has never been implemented.

== Monuments ==
Territet is home to three museums, the Swiss national audiovisual museum (French: musée national suisse de l'audiovisuel), the new Ruzo museum and the carriage museum (French: musée de la calèche). There are several important monuments, among which the French: Hôtel des Alpes-Grand Hôtel which is listed as a cultural property of national significance in Switzerland, an Anglican church, St. John's Montreux (built 1875–78) and a statue of Empress Sisi of Austria created by Italian sculptor Antonio Chiattone in 1902.

== Key celebrities ==
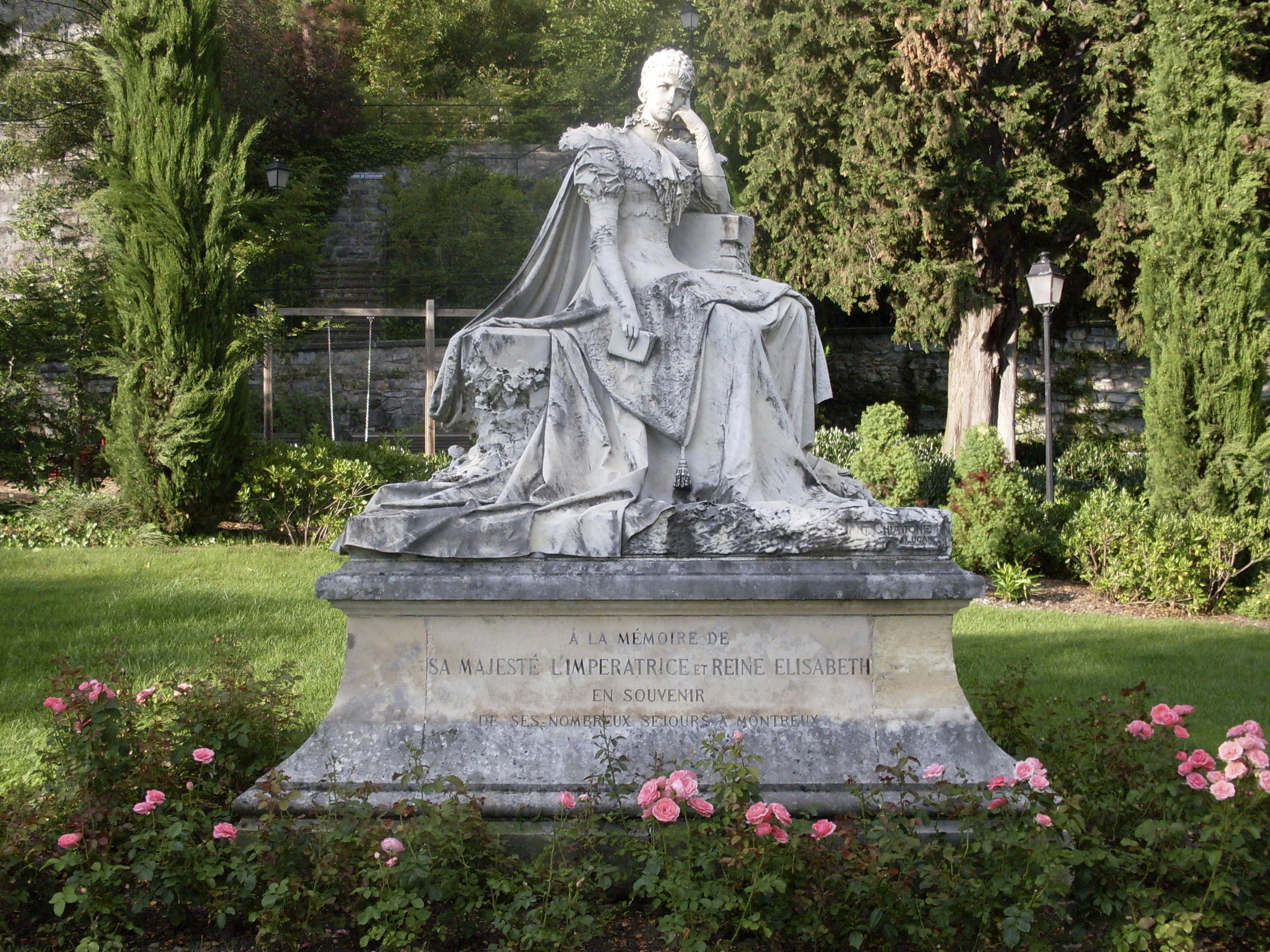
Statue of Empress Sisi of Austria by Antonio Chiattone, inaugurated in 1902

- Franz Joseph I of Austria stayed in Territet in 1893
- Empress Sisi of Austria stayed several time in Territet
- French engineer Édouard Belin, died in Territet in 1963
- Swiss painter Victor Ruzo, resided in Territet where a museum bearing his name was opened in 1992, and died there in 2008
- Austrian composer Arnold Schoenberg, worked on his opéra Moses und Aron while staying in Territet
- Actor Emil Steinberger lived in Territet in the 2000–2010 decade
- German photographer Horst Tappe lived and worked from 1965 to his death in 2005
- Freddie Mercury, lead singer of British band Queen.

== Transport ==
Territet can be reached by:

- Ship: through the service of the Compagnie générale de navigation sur le lac Léman (CGN)
- Territet–Glion funicular railway
- Train: Swiss Federal Railways, line Milan – Brigue – Lausanne – Geneva, at Territet railway station
- Car: through the A9 motorway, exit No. 15 (Montreux) or No. 16 (Villeneuve)

A second funicular with 4 intermediate stations operated from 1910 to 1992: Funiculaire Territet–Mont Fleuri.

== Teaching institutions ==
- Institut Monte Rosa, which was opened in 1874 primarily for Dutch students girls.

== Other sources ==
- Gilbert de Montmollin, Le Grand-Hôtel et Hôtel des Alpes de Territet, Audiorama Musée suisse de l'audio-visuel, 1994, 10 pages
- Dave Lüthi, Le Grand-Hôtel et Hôtel des Alpes à Territet (1840–1975): Reflet du développement de Montreux au XIXe siècle : Historique et description, Musée du Vieux-Montreux, 1998
- Most of the information in this article was translated from the French Wikipedia pages fr:Territet and fr:Hôtel des Alpes-Grand Hôtel on 9 September 2015.
