= Pact of Territet =

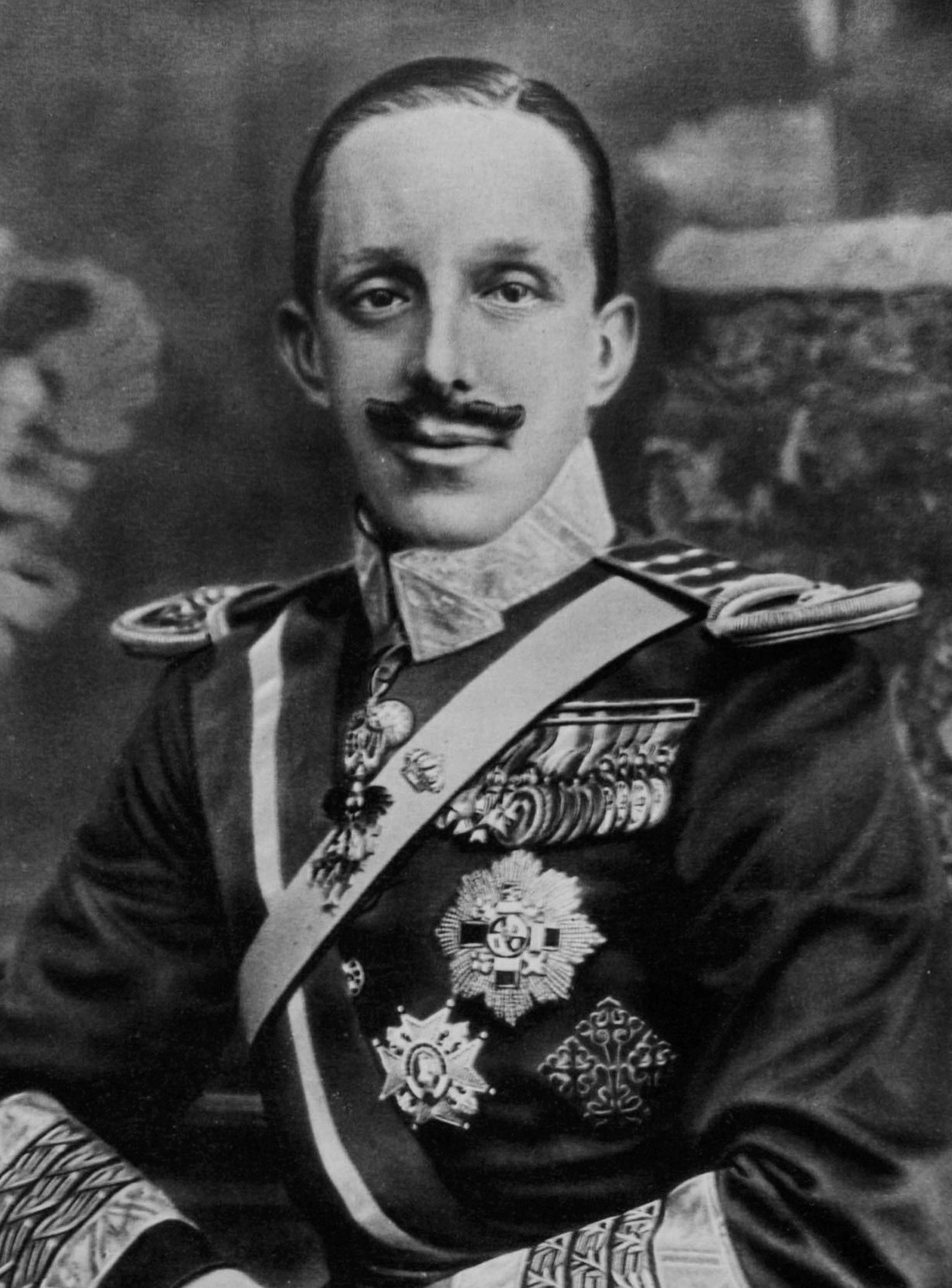
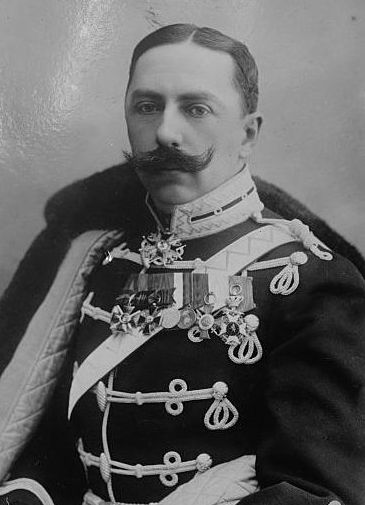
Alfonso XIII (left/top) and Jaime III (right/bottom)

Pact of Territet (Spanish: El Pacto de Territet) was an attempt to mend the long-standing dynastic feud between two Spanish Borbón branches and their supporters, known as the Alfonsists and the Carlists. In September 1931 it was agreed between two competitive exiled claimants, the former king Alfonso XIII and his Carlist rival the Infante Jaime, Duke of Madrid (recognized by Carlists as Jaime III). The deal envisioned that a new Spanish constituent assembly would pronounce who should be the king, and both pretenders pledged to accept the verdict. It was also tacitly understood that the following king should be Juan de Borbón y Battenberg, descendant of the Alfonsist branch but supposed to embrace Carlist political principles. Following the unexpected death of Jaime III the agreement was questioned by his Carlist successor, Infante Alfonso Carlos; he demanded further declarations on part of the Alfonsists. As they failed to materialize, both branches stuck to their own principles and the deal was abandoned. In historiography there are doubts about details of the agreement, and some authors question its very existence.

== Background ==
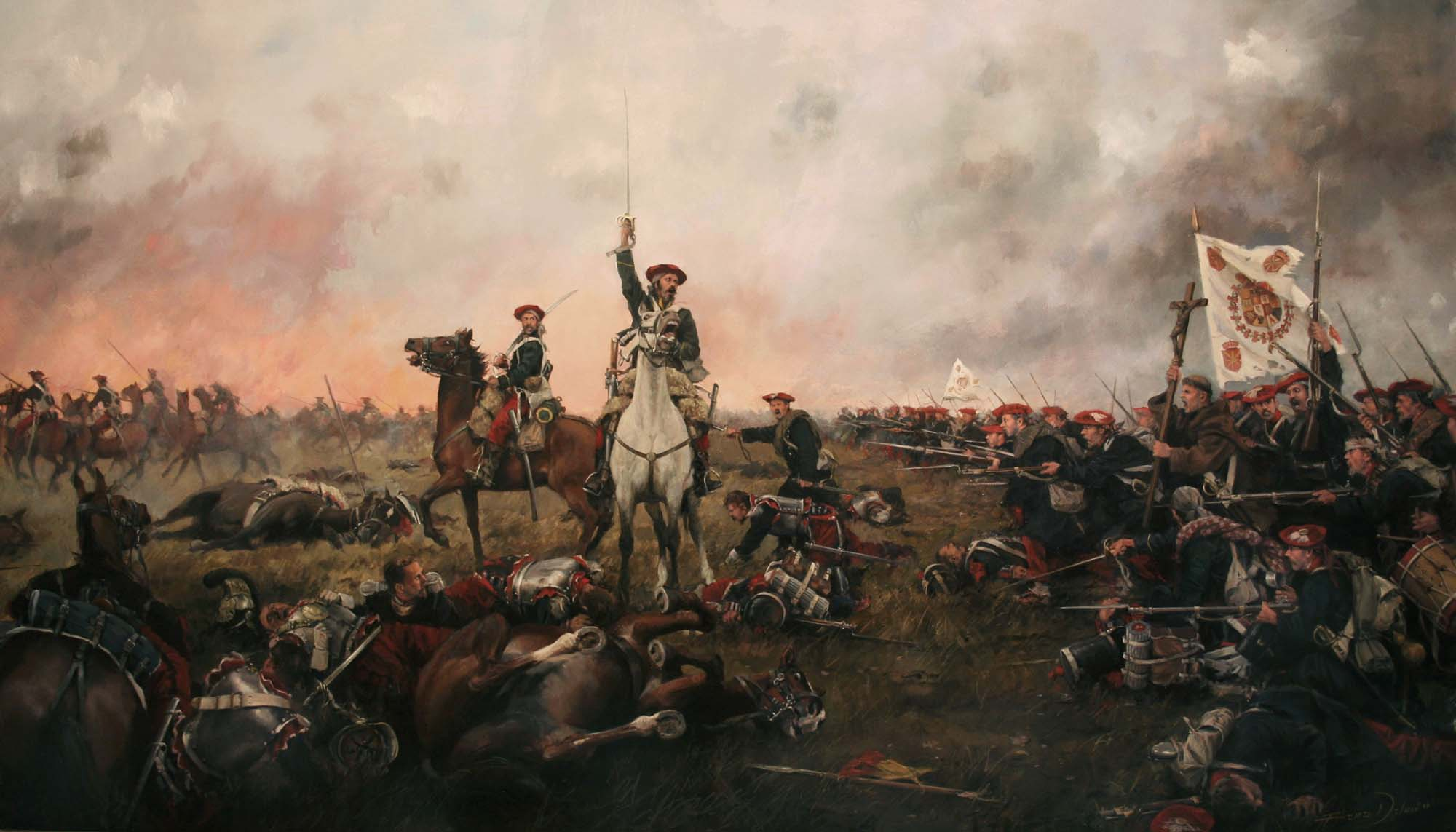
Carlist wars in art

In the 1830s the ruling Spanish house of Borbón suffered breakup, conditioned by two distinct visions of what the legitimate succession law was. The family got politically divided into two branches, the Alfonsists and the Carlists. The former got the upper hand and following a civil war – related also to other major cleavages – secured their rule in Madrid, while the latter went on exile. Alfonsism and Carlism became two political currents organized around loyalty to different Borbón branches, though there was also major ideological difference; the former embraced Liberalism, the latter opted for Traditionalism. The split continued up to the 20th century, with another civil war in the 1870s and a series of other minor violent conflicts. In the 1920s it seemed that Carlism was on its last legs, reduced to a minor political movement close to extinction. However, the fall of the Spanish monarchy in 1931 dramatically changed the setting. Suddenly also the Alfonsist branch found itself exiled from Spain, claiming the throne which no longer existed.

When the Second Spanish Republic was born, the Alfonsist dynastic head was the 45-year-old Alfonso de Borbón y Habsburgo-Lorena, who as king Alfonso XIII ruled Spain between 1886 and 1931 (furtherly referred as Don Alfonso). At the time he had 6 children, including 4 sons. His oldest son Alfonso de Borbón y Battenberg was declared Príncipe de Asturias, a traditional title reserved for the official successor to the throne, though he was physically impaired and there were some doubts as to his ability to rule. At the time the Carlist dynastic head was the 61-year-old Jaime de Borbón y Borbón-Parma, who inherited the claim from his late father in 1909 and was recognized by his followers as king Jaime III (furtherly referred as Don Jaime). He was not married, had no children and given his age and bachelor status, he was highly unlikely to have any descendants. The next-in-line to the Carlist throne was Don Jaime's paternal uncle, the 82-year-old Alfonso Carlos de Borbón y Austria-Este, who also had no children (furtherly referred as Don Alfonso Carlos). Hence, it was almost certain that the direct line of Carlist claimants would extinguish, probably with childless death of Don Alfonso Carlos first and then with the childless death of Don Jaime. It was not clear who would inherit the Carlist claim later.

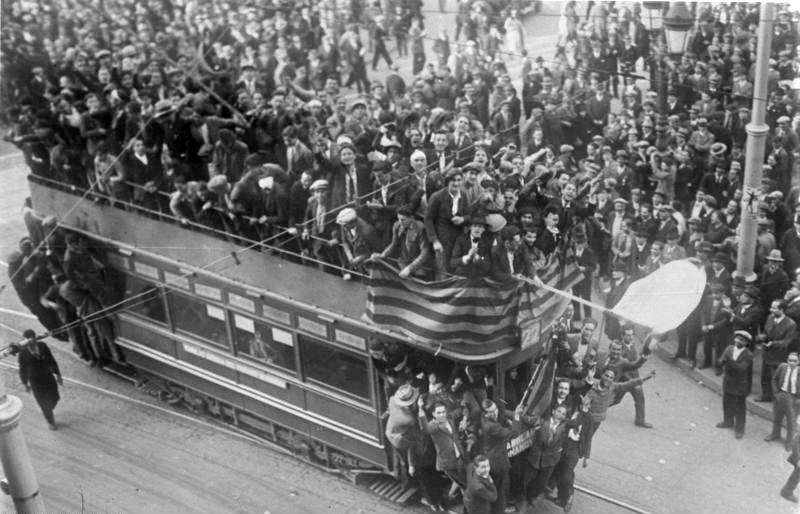
republic declared, 1931

Both Don Alfonso and Don Jaime referred to each other as "cousin", though their family relation was distant; their great-grandparents were brothers and they had a common great-great-grandfather, the king of Spain Carlos IV. They maintained some correspondence, scarce and formal, but in correct tone; usually it was reduced to greetings related to various family events. However, there were also cases of somewhat warmer exchange, e.g. following the 1921 Annual disaster Don Jaime wrote that he was ready to join Don Alfonso's soldiers in Africa seeking revenge; Don Alfonso thanked him cordially and declared that the moment was not opportune. It is not clear whether before 1931 the two have ever met in person; except an awkward 1908 incident of unsure credibility, reportedly having taken place in France, theoretically they might have met outside Spain during grand events related to family life of European royals, like weddings or funerals, but no source confirms this. Don Alfonso and Don Alfonso Carlos maintained some more intense correspondence related to financial problems of the latter after the fall of Austro-Hungarian empire; in the 1920s the official Spanish diplomacy greatly assisted him in terms of ensuring safe status of his real estate in republican Austria.

== Rapprochement ==
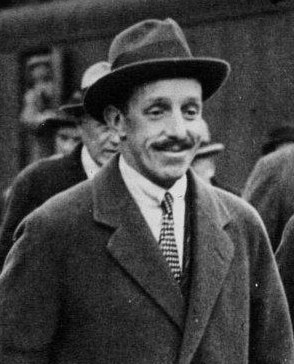
Don Alfonso on exile

Though for almost 100 years in a bitter dynastical feud, in 1931 the Alfonsists and the Carlists found themselves driven somewhat closer by their shared hostility towards the newly established republic. Also, sudden reduction of Don Alfonso to the status of an exile put him on similar footing to Don Jaime, which facilitated communication. All this tended to "weaken objections to the consideration of joint political activity with fusion as a possible final goal". Don Jaime was driven by the acute succession problem; Don Alfonso was desperate to "grab at anything which might boost the slender chance of a restoration". In both movements there were currents which supported opening talks on some sort of dynastical agreement, possibly even leading up to final reconciliation of the two branches. However, within both movements there were also currents vehemently opposed to any deal. Many Carlists were infuriated by an idea of a compromise with the hated liberal dynasty that generations of their forefathers fought (and died) to topple. In the Alfonsist ranks, not fully recovered from bewilderment and shock following the rapid fall of the monarchy, the opposition to any deal with the Carlists was less pronounced. However, there were also doubts about abandoning liberal principles for the sake of adopting ultra-reactionary features.

Having left Spain from the port of Valencia in April 1931 the former king Don Alfonso travelled by sea to Marseilles and then further on towards Paris. He set his residence in Fontainebleau, first in a hotel and then in a chateau, purchased soon afterwards. At that time Don Jaime, who usually shuttled between his palace in the Austrian Frohsdorf and his apartment in Paris, resided in the French capital. It is not clear whether the two have met in person in Paris prior to late summer of 1931. However, at one point in the spring of 1931 they decided to open talks on some sort of dynastic agreement; no source consulted provides information who initiated the negotiations. Both Don Alfonso and Don Jaime appointed their envoys, respectively Julio Dánvila Rivera and José Maria Gómez Pujadas. They met in late May 1931 in Saint-Jean-de-Luz, at the residence of a French legitmist Vicomtesse de la Gironde. As they found promising perspectives, Dánvila and Gómez Pujadas reported to their kings accordingly.

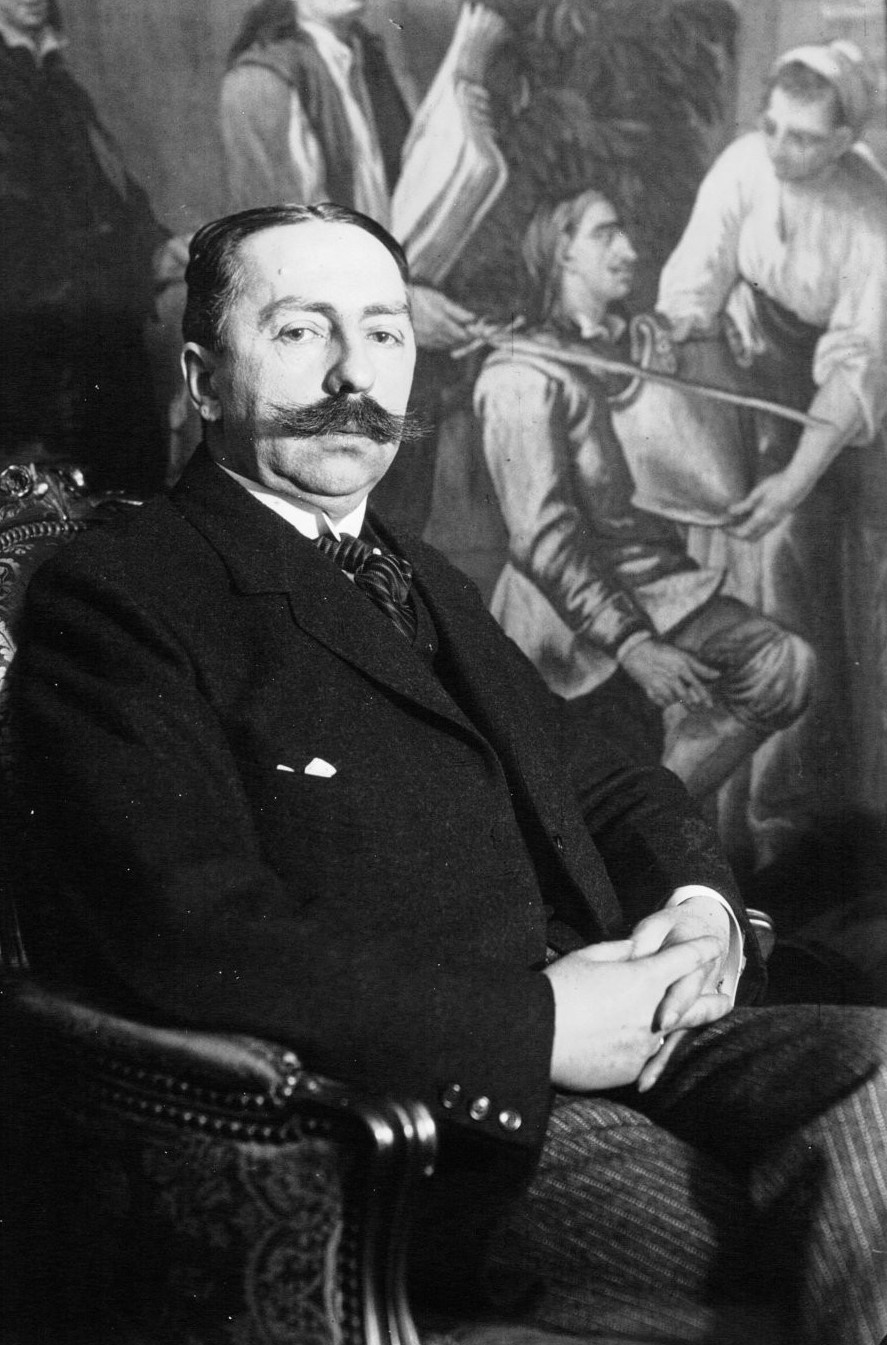
Don Jaime, 1920s

Direct correspondence between the two claimants followed before Don Jaime left Paris for his traditional summer residence in Frohsdorf. He formed an informal body, made of prestigious Carlists, who were consulted on the proposals. No details are known though it seems that basic principles of some consensus were agreed at the time; also a so-called Comité de Accíon, the body called to discuss would-be violent action against the republic, continued talks with the Alfonsists in Saint-Jean-de-Luz and San Sebastián. Don Jaime was reportedly strongly influenced by his secretary Francisco Melgar, Rafael de Olazábal and especially by Gómez Pujadas, who travelled to Frohsdorf to convince his king; they were allegedly from the onset determined to work towards a fusion and towards passing succession rights to the Alfonsist branch. It is not clear who in the direct entourage of Don Alfonso – apart from Dánvila – was pushing towards a deal; other of his negotiators named are Juan de la Cierva y Peñafiel and generals Miguel Ponte y Manso de Zúñiga and Luis Orgaz Yoldi. Further phone calls between Don Alfonso and Don Jaime followed. Details and drafting of a written document was left to Dánvila and Gómez.

== The pact ==
Territet

Dánvila and Gómez agreed the text and having obtained approval of their monarchs they signed the draft in the Swiss locality of Territet on September 12, 1931; it was subject to later royal ratification.

The drafted agreement was titled Pacto de familia and formulated as 6 points, in which the signatories declared that:

- 1. they would not attempt to restore monarchy by force, they would instruct their supporters to work in the spirit of monarchist unity and that they would co-operate with any genuinely Spanish ("de orden puramente españolista") government to set up a Constituent Cortes
- 2. they would not attempt to re-enter Spain until a new constitution is agreed (they did not mean a constitution at the time discussed in the republican Cortes, to be adopted in December 1931)
- 3. they would not require all their supporters to follow the agreement, which is a family deal
- 4. they would accept any sovereign nominated by the Constituent Cortes ("Soberano hecho por las Cortes")
- 5. in case Don Alfonso is elected as king, Don Jaime would renounce his claim and ask Don Alfonso Carlos to follow suit
- 6. in case Don Jaime is elected as king, he would recognize all rights of Don Alfonso ("reconocerá la categoría, tratamiento y beneficios que correspondian as mi primo don Alfonso") and demand that his successor be nominated

Scholars claim it was tacitly assumed that Cortes would be corporatively organized and that it in case Don Jaime is elected, his successor would be the third son of Don Alfonso, Don Juan. In earlier correspondence Don Jaime declared he was ready to educate Don Juan, at that time 18-years-old, in principles of Traditionalism. The final paragraph stated – apart from grandiose references to prosperity of Spain – that the document was signed in two copies. The draft has not been made public.

By late September Don Jaime has returned to Paris. Don Alfonso visited him in his apartment on either September 22 or 23 (Don Jaime insisted that as he was the head of the family, Don Alfonso should visit him first), and Don Jaime re-visited Don Alfonso in his chateau in Fontainebleau on September 25, 1931. It is not clear whether they ratified the Territet draft; some scholars claim so, some claim otherwise and some do not take a firm stand, referring to a "supposedly signed" pact. Afterwards they issued a public statement, which declared common will to strengthen family relations, which before had been marked by political, though not personal discrepancies. The same document declared they would work jointly to build a common front, tasked to save Spain from anarchy and communism. In a later separate statement, issued by Don Jaime only, the author noted that "neither my cousin nor I have abdicated our rights, for this is simply a matter of political agreement with no other goal than the happiness of Spain". None of the public statements contained a reference to any family pact.

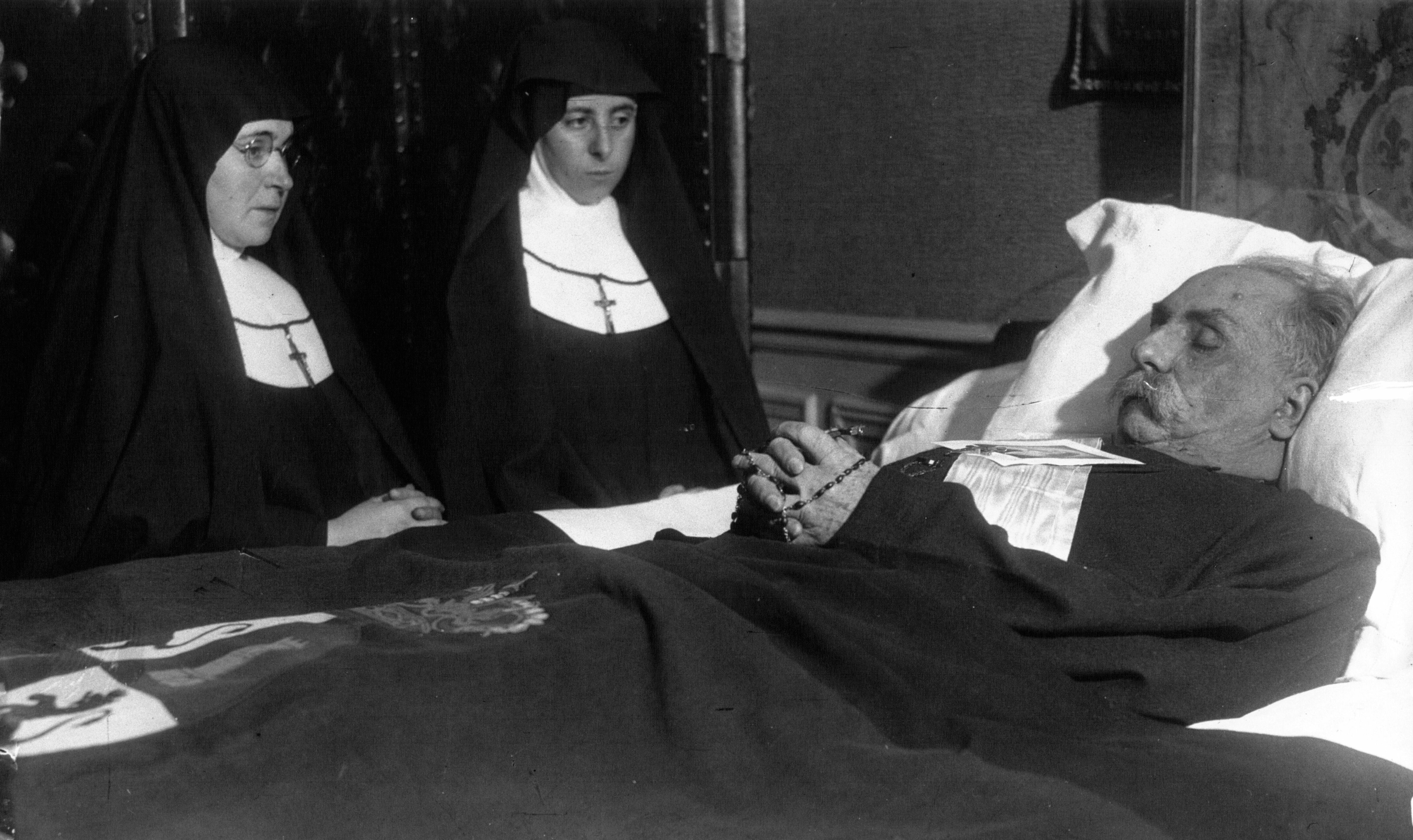
Don Jaime on his death bed

The second son of Don Alfonso (neither Príncipe de Asturias nor Don Juan) was supposed to visit his namesake Don Jaime in Paris next Sunday, on October 4, 1931. However, on October 2 Don Jaime died unexpectedly due to heart failure; none of the sources consulted suggests it was anyhow related to talks on dynastical succession. The funeral mass in Paris was attended by Don Alfonso and his entire family, the funeral in Tenuta Reale estate near Viareggio was attended by Don Alfonso Carlos.

== Follow-up ==
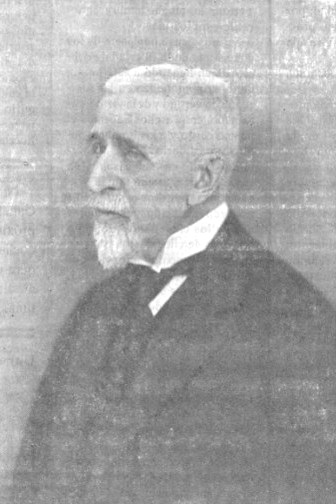
Don Alfonso Carlos

With death of Don Jaime the Carlist claim passed on Don Alfonso Carlos, resident in Vienna. Don Alfonso immediately sent him a letter and included the text of the Pact of Territet, reportedly with signatures of both Don Alfonso and Don Jaime at the bottom. It is not clear whether this was the moment when the octogenarian learnt the exact terms of the agreement or whether he had known them before. In the summer of 1931 he corresponded with Don Jaime on ongoing talks and was supportive of some dynastic agreement. However, he reportedly remained skeptical about details and according to his own later account he refused to sign or even support the draft at one stage of the negotiations. When responding to Don Alfonso on October 7 Don Alfonso Carlos expressed satisfaction that the pact signed would benefit Spain but remained ambiguous whether he was prepared to accept it. In early December 1931 in a private letter to one of his Carlist correspondents he approvingly referred to a joint monarchic pact intended to save Spain from communism and hinted at an interview (by telephone?) he had had with Don Alfonso. However, the content of the interview is not clear and it is not known whether Don Alfonso Carlos declared himself disposed towards endorsing the pact.

In late 1931 both claimants appointed their delegates, which met and held talks in Bordeaux. However, Don Alfonso Carlos started to introduce own conditions and demanded that Don Juan, if supposed to be the agreed Príncipe de Asturias, makes a public and official promise that he would rule in line with Traditionalist principles. On January 6, 1932, a statement was published on behalf of the two Alfonsos, though it is not clear whether indeed they signed it. In its first point it declared the will to form a common monarchist formation, which would work towards restoration of the monarchy. In the second point it declared that their followers were not necessarily obliged to follow such strategy. The third one declared Don Alfonso Carlos the head of the House of Borbón and the acting regent, which in an opportune moment would convoke the Cortes to work out details of the regime. Don Alfonso claimed also to have accepted "credo tradicionalista" and pledged to act in line with Traditionalist principles.

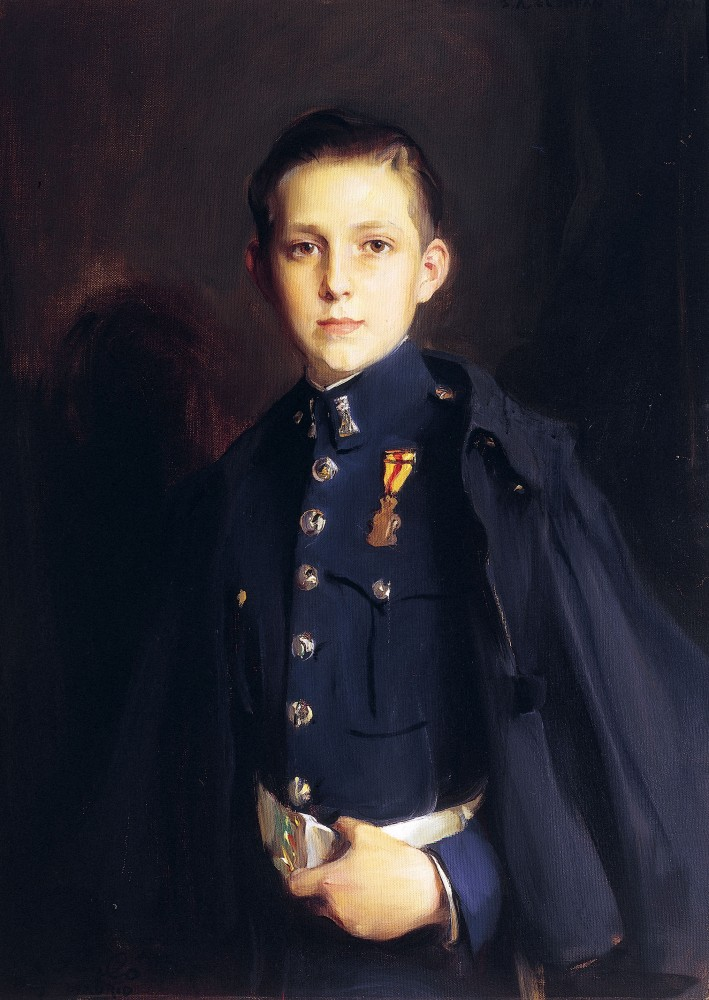
Don Juan (1927)

It seems that Don Alfonso Carlos was expecting some sort of further public declaration on part of Don Alfonso, referred to as "mi muy amado sobrino"; in this statement he was expected to declare legitimacy of the Carlist branch and de facto deny the legitimacy of his own. Later in January 1932 Don Alfonso expressed his intention to unify both branches under the Traditionalist standard, referred to Don Alfonso Carlos as "amado tio y jefe de mi familia", but did not endorse Carlist dynastic rights. In July 1932 Don Alfonso Carlos issued a statement which declared that his successor could only be the one who fully accepts Traditionalism. In September 1932 Don Alfonso Carlos was already growing skeptical about genuine Traditionalist views, declared by Don Alfonso. At that time in internal Carlist correspondence the 83-year-old admitted that after his death indeed the agnatic succession would pass on Don Alfonso, but he could not be considered a legitimate king unless in a solemn and official form he swears allegiance to Traditionalist rules and principles. In the fall of 1932 the two Alfonsos met in France, but the encounter produced no progress.

== New designs ==
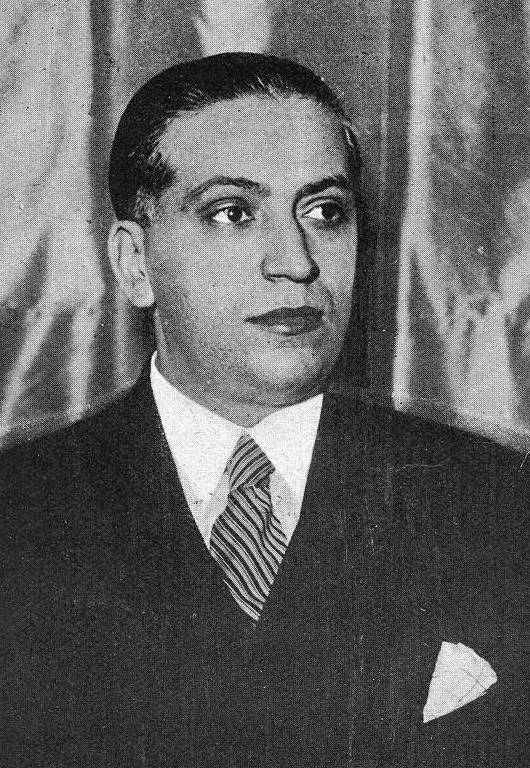
Calvo Sotelo

In September 1932 advisers of Don Alfonso, including José Calvo Sotelo, came out with a new plan. They suggested that Don Alfonso and his two oldest sons renounce their rights in favor of Don Juan and that Don Alfonso Carlos abdicates, again in favor of Don Juan, who embraces Traditionalism; there was no mention about either constituent Cortes or its choice. Again two negotiating teams were formed; they met in Paris and held talks, presided by Don Alfonso. Reportedly two teams were close to an agreement, including that Don Juan would go to Vienna and live with Don Alfonso Carlos, learning Traditionalist principles. However, Don Alfonso Carlos kept demanding that Don Alfonso recognizes legitimacy of the Carlist branch. At that point Don Alfonso either developed second thoughts or was persuaded by his advisers, mostly Conde de Romanones and Juan de la Cierva, that the concessions would be too far-reaching. Since late 1932 there was little follow-up and negotiations between the two claimants were drying out.

There was little progress in course of 1933, apart that Carlist and Alfonsist political structures in Spain, CT and RE, formed an electoral alliance; it was only grudgingly approved by Don Alfonso Carlos. Many leaders of RE were not averse towards incorporating elements from the Traditionalist ideological toolset, but not necessarily up to the point of denying legitimacy to the Alfonsist branch. In 1933 two oldest sons of Don Alfonso on basis of their physical impairment renounced their succession rights in favor of their younger brother Don Juan, but with no apparent relation to any dealings with the Carlists. Within the Carlist ranks unease about a would-be accord with the despised liberal branch was on the rise. The current known as Cruzadistas demanded clear declaration that no such thing was possible and advanced own dynastic solution; in return, Don Alfonso Carlos expulsed them from the Comunión.

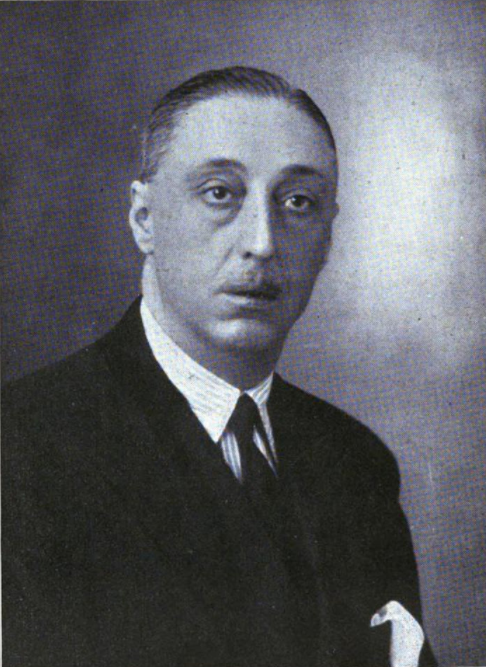
Conde Rodezno

In 1934 Don Alfonso Carlos issued manifestos which claimed that recognition of legitimacy of the Carlist branch is the conditio sine qua non expected of any his successor. He also enforced resignation of Conde Rodezno from the post of jefe delegado, head of the Carlist political structures in Spain. Rodezno, strongly leaning towards a dynastical alliance, was replaced with Manuel Fal Conde, a politician hostile towards the ungodly liberal Alfonsist branch. Finally, also in 1934 Don Alfonso Carlos ordered withdrawal from TYRE, a platform of electoral and parliamentary co-ordination with RE.

In the summer of 1935 Don Alfonso travelled to Puchheim to invite Don Alfonso Carlos to the wedding of Don Juan. Perhaps he viewed it as a chance to renew talks about a succession deal, but Don Alfonso Carlos preferred to stick to purely family matters (and apologized he would not attend). Don Alfonso was left disappointed; this was the last meeting of the two. In January 1936 (the decision made public in April 1936) Don Alfonso Carlos decided about the Carlist succession: after his death the dynastic Carlist leader was to be Xavier Borbón-Parma, though not as a king but as a regent, supposed to supervise the process of electing a new king by a grand Carlist assembly. In internal correspondence he explicitly declared Pacto de Territet null and void. He made no further references to the pact before his death in September 1936. Neither the Alfonsists did; Don Alfonso when abdicating and Don Juan when assuming the claim in 1941 mentioned no agreement with the Carlists.

== Review of dynastic proposals ==
CoA of Alfonso XIII

During all dynastic talks in 1931-1936 there were effectively 4 proposals on the table:

- 1. that a) constituent assembly elects either Don Alfonso or Don Jaime; b) the unelected claimant renounces his claim; c) whatever the choice is the following king be Don Juan; d) Don Juan accepts Traditionalist principles. In this version there was no mention about which dynasty, the Alfonsist or the Carlist, was legitimate. This was the proposal apparently agreed as Pact of Territet, but effectively rejected by Don Alfonso Carlos
- 2. the proposal similar to Pact of Territet (with Don Alfonso Carlos replacing the defunct Don Jaime), but with one additional point, namely that Don Alfonso declares legitimacy of the Carlist branch (and ipso facto, that his own branch did not hold legitimacy from 1833 up to this point). This was the proposal advanced by Don Alfonso Carlos and discussed between late 1931 and late 1932, but rejected by Don Alfonso
- 3. that a) Don Alfonso renounces his claim and his two older sons renounce their succession rights, all in favor of Don Juan; b) Don Alfonso Carlos abdicates in favor of Don Juan; c) Don Juan accepts Traditionalist principles. This was the proposal advanced by the Alfonsists in late 1932, but rejected by Don Alfonso Carlos
- 4. that a) Don Alfonso declares legitimacy of the Carlist branch (again ipso facto declaring that his own branch did not hold legitimacy from 1833 up to this point); b) Don Alfonso Carlos abdicates, either in favor of Don Alfonso or Don Juan. This was the proposal advanced by Don Alfonso Carlos since mid-1932 and the one he might have hoped for up until 1936, but rejected by Don Alfonso.

During later decades there were other attempts to end the dynastic conflict. In the 1940s within Carlism there was a current known as Juanismo or Rodeznismo, which advocated that under the regency of Don Javier and in line with guidelines from late Don Alfonso Carlos, there is a grand Carlist assembly organized; during that assembly representatives of this current hoped to have Don Juan declared as the Carlist king. The assembly in question has never materialized and in the mid-1950s it appeared that Don Javier intended to assume the claim himself. In response, representatives of the same Juanista current opened direct talks with Don Juan; in 1957 in an official and pompous act he solemnly accepted Traditionalist principles and was declared king by a major and prestigious group of Carlists. They hoped to marginalise supporters of Don Javier, but instead they found themselves in minority. Since the mid-1960s there were individual but fairly numerous Carlists, increasingly estranged by new ideological turn of the Borbón-Parmas, who turned towards the son of Don Juan, Don Juan Carlos. Many of them later recognized him as king Juan Carlos I, though not in any collective or official way.

Carlist standard

Today there is no current within Carlism which declares loyalty to Felipe de Borbón y Grecia as to king Felipe VI. There are factions which support Sixto Enrique de Borbón-Parma y Bourbon-Busset, Carlos Javier de Borbón-Parma y Nassau, Domingo de Habsburgo-Toscana y Hohenzollern-Sigmaringen, or which do not support any particular person and any particular branch. There is also a branch which claims Carlist identity but rejects the monarchy altogether. The Alfonsists are very much united behind the current ruler, though their ranks diminish as monarchism is decreasingly popular in Spain.

== In historiography ==
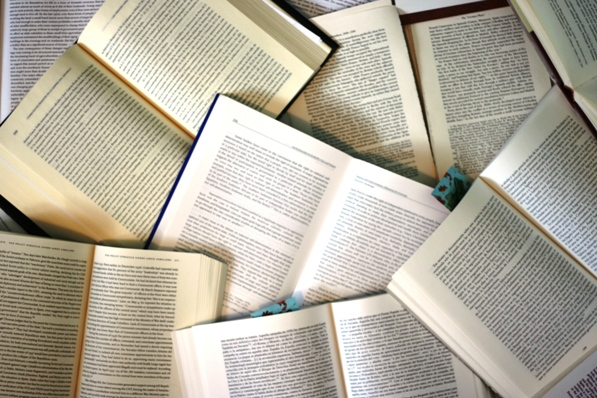

In historiography the Pact of Territet is generally approached as a minor episode which had no material impact on the history of Spain; many even detailed works ignore it altogether and some prefer rather to talk about some rapprochement between the Alfonsists and the Carlists, but with no explicit reference to any pact. Moreover, there are grave doubts as to many questions related to the pact, including the one whether any agreement has ever been formalized, either as a pact or otherwise. Academic scholars demonstrate great caution and might refer to a "supposedly signed" pact or "polémico pacto". Though a facsimile has been published, some note that as no original documents have ever been found there is a high chance of falsification. In partisan Carlist historiography initially the existence of the pact was accepted. Later both Traditionalist and progressist currents joined forces in advancing the theory that the alleged pact was "apócrifo", an Alfonsist plot, a fake supposed to demonstrate that the Carlists had consented to Don Juan assuming the united monarchist claim.

Among those scholars who tend to accept that Pact of Territet has indeed been concluded there are various opinions as to its fate. Some claim that it was modeled on a so-called Pact of Dover of 1912, an agreement supposedly signed by exiled branches of the Portuguese Braganzas, which advanced a very similar dynastic solution. Most authors suggest that once marginalized, the Alfonsists and the Carlists (or Don Alfonso and Don Jaime personally) found themselves politically closer and decided to swallow historical enmity in pursuance a common goal, this is the monarchic restoration in Spain. Though there might be doubts as to good will of either one or both claimants, it is suggested that they decided to join forces without abandoning own dynastic logic, and some brand it as a "relatively sensible agreement". Most works point to personal initiative of both royals and present it not as an action triggered by their supporters, but rather as a personal initiative which had to overcome serious doubts among the rank-and-file.

The ultimate collapse of the Territet scheme – provided it has ever been agreed – is usually related to the unexpected death of Don Jaime. While Don Jaime was at times considered loose in terms of adherence to the doctrine, Don Alfonso Carlos was leaning towards the intransigent Traditionalist stand. He perfectly realized that extinction of the dynasty posed a threat to Carlist future, but he believed that a compromise with the Alfonsists in absence of their clear recognition of Carlist legitimacy was an even greater threat. One theory holds that Don Alfonso Carlos was initially not aware of the details, and it was only once he had realized the scale of concessions that he decided to backtrack. Some authors claim that Alfonso Carlos rejected the pact straight away, others maintain that in 1931-1933 he was unsure about the way forward and only around 1934 he decided to abandon the idea of a dynastic reconciliation, either because he had failed to extract from Don Alfonso recognition of legitimacy of the Carlist branch, or because he realized the Carlist rank-and-file would never accept a compromise with the Alfonsinos. As to Don Alfonso it is believed that up to 1935 he might have hoped for some sort of agreement, especially if it would benefit his son, Don Juan. Some conclude that "no firm explanation can be given for the apparent abandonment of an agreement signed only two weeks before".

== See also ==
- Alfonsism
- Alfonso XIII
- Carlism
- Infante Alfonso Carlos, Duke of San Jaime
- Infante Jaime, Duke of Madrid
- Infante Juan, Count of Barcelona
