= Institut Monte Rosa =

International school in Territet-Montreux, Switzerland

Location
- Av. de Chillon 57; 1820 Territet-Montreux, Canton of Vaud; Switzerland

Information
- Type: Private, International boarding school
- Motto: Virtue through work
- Established: 1874
- Director: Bernhard Gademann
- Faculty: 20
- Enrollment: 80 boarding
- Average class size: max. 12 students
- Student to teacher ratio: 5:1
- Nickname: Monte Rosa
- Website: www.monterosa.ch

Institute Monte Rosa, commonly referred to as Monte Rosa or Monte, was a private, international boarding school, in Montreux, Switzerland, founded in 1874.

== History ==
The International School Monte Rosa was founded in 1874 by the Essarts family under the name of ‘Institut des Essarts’. At the time, the school was made for girls only, mainly coming from the Netherlands. The school adopted its current name in the 1960s, and Monte Rosa became co-educational in the early 1960s. The Gademann family has been running and leading the international school ever since then.

== Academic curriculum ==
=== Academic year programs ===
The academic program of the Anglo-American section is strongly college-preparatory. Students planning to attend American universities are prepared for College Board examinations and receive the high school diploma on successful completion of 12th grade. Specially designed courses are available for entry to business or other colleges.

== Facilities ==
The school is housed in a nineteenth-century mansion in Territet-Montreux on the shores of Lake Geneva.

== Tuition fees ==
As of 2014/15, the annual boarding and academic fees are CHF 61,000 (approximately US$65,000), without extra-fees such as sports, laundry etc.
