= Territet railway station =

Railway station in Territet, Switzerland

Territet
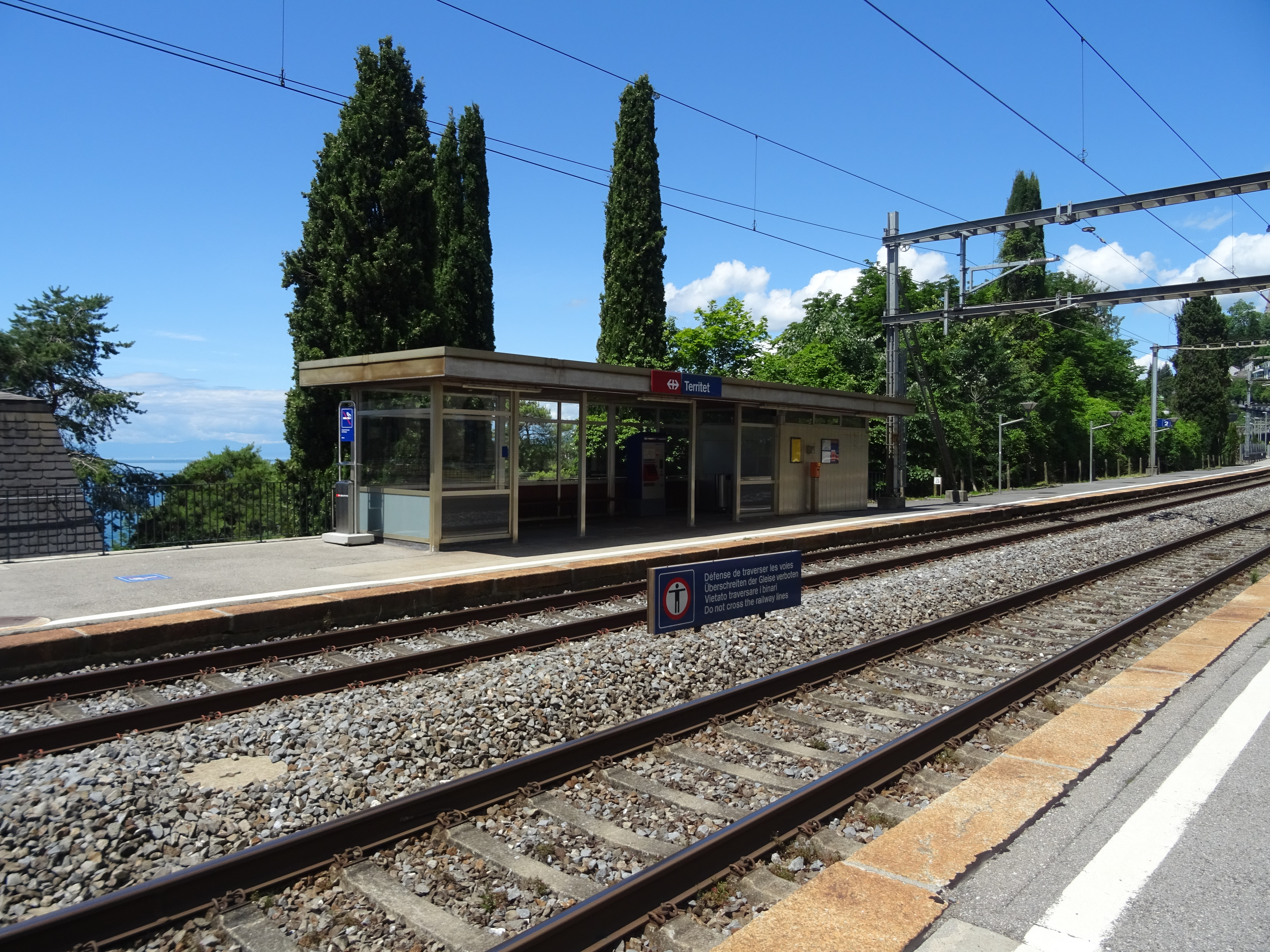
- The station platforms in 2020

General information
- Location: Territet; Switzerland
- Coordinates: 46°25′35″N 6°55′22″E
- Elevation: 386 m (1,266 ft)
- Owner: Swiss Federal Railways
- Line: Simplon line
- Distance: 26.0 km (16.2 mi) from Lausanne
- Platforms: 2 (2 side platforms)
- Tracks: 2
- Train operators: Swiss Federal Railways
- Connections: Territet–Glion funicular railway; VMCV trolleybus line

Construction
- Accessible: No

Other information
- Station code: 8501301 (TER)
- Fare zone: 73 (mobilis)

Passengers
- 2023: 340 per weekday (SBB (excluding MVR))

Services
Preceding station	RER Vaud	Following station
Montreux towards Le Brassus or Vallorbe	R4	Veytaux-Chillon towards Vevey
Location

Territet railway station (French: Gare de Territet) is a railway station in the locality of Territet, within the municipality of Montreux, in the Swiss canton of Vaud. It is an intermediate stop on the standard gauge Simplon line of Swiss Federal Railways. The station is across the street from the valley station of the Territet–Glion funicular railway. Funiculaire Territet–Mont Fleuri was closed in 1992.

== Services ==
As of the December 2024 timetable change, the following services stop at Territet:

- RER Vaud R4: hourly service between Le Brassus and Bex; hourly service to Vallorbe on weekdays; limited service from Bex to St-Maurice.
