= Victor Ruzo =

Swiss painter (1913–2008)

Victor Ruzo (born 22 December 1913 in Straubenzell; died 26 March 2008 in Montreux) was a Swiss painter. His artworks include 'Fine Stockings' and 'Chevaux'.
