= Territet–Glion funicular railway =

Funicular railway in suburbs of Montreux, Switzerland

Coordinates: 46.4302°N 6.9237°E

Territet-Glion funicular railway
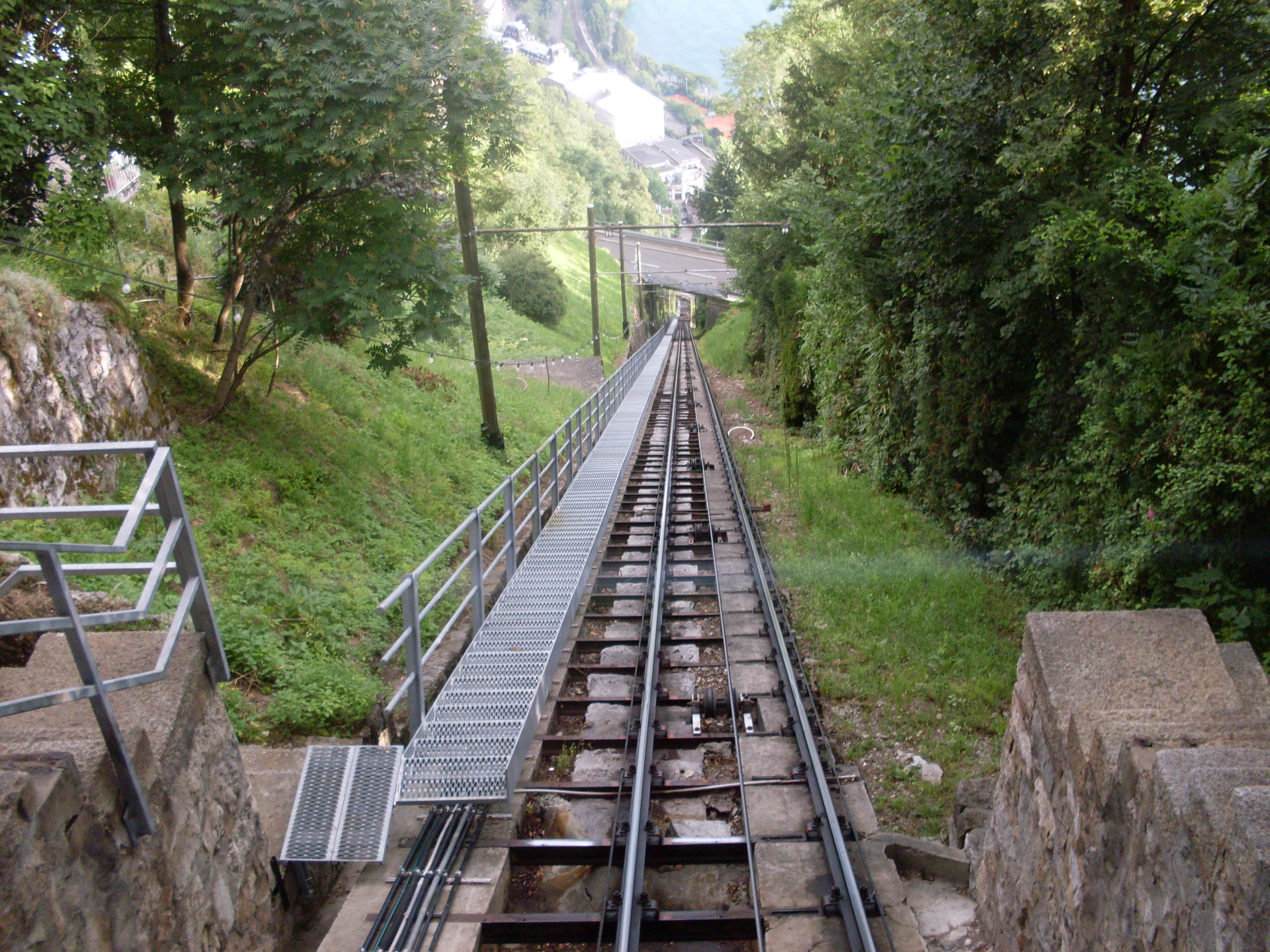
- View down the line from Glion to Territet and Lake Geneva

Overview
- Status: In operation
- Owner: Transports Montreux-Vevey-Riviera (since 2001); Compagnie du chemin de fer funiculaire Territet-Glion (until 1992); Chemins de fer des Rochers-de-Naye, Montreux-Territet-Glion-Naye, S.A. (1992 - name change in 2001)
- Locale: Montreux, Switzerland
- Termini: Territet-Funi; Glion-Funi
- Connecting lines: Simplon-line (Territet), Montreux-Glion-Rochers de Naye (in Glion)
- Stations: 3 (including Collonge)

Service
- Type: Funicular
- Operator(s): Transports Montreux-Vevey-Riviera (short: MVR)
- Rolling stock: 2

History
- Opened: 19 August 1883 (142 years ago)

Technical
- Number of tracks: single track with passing loop
- Track gauge: 1,000 mm (3 ft 3 3/8 in) metre gauge
- Electrification: 1975 (water counterbalancing before)
- Highest elevation: 687 m (2,254 ft)
- Maximum incline: 57% (40% min)

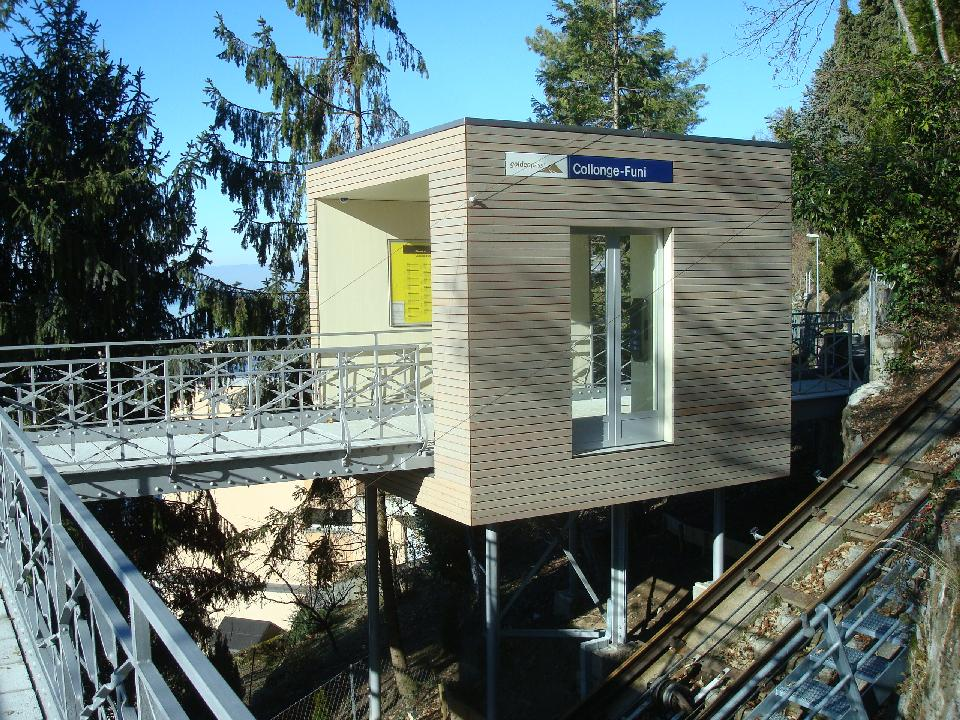
New station Collonge-Funi at January 2010

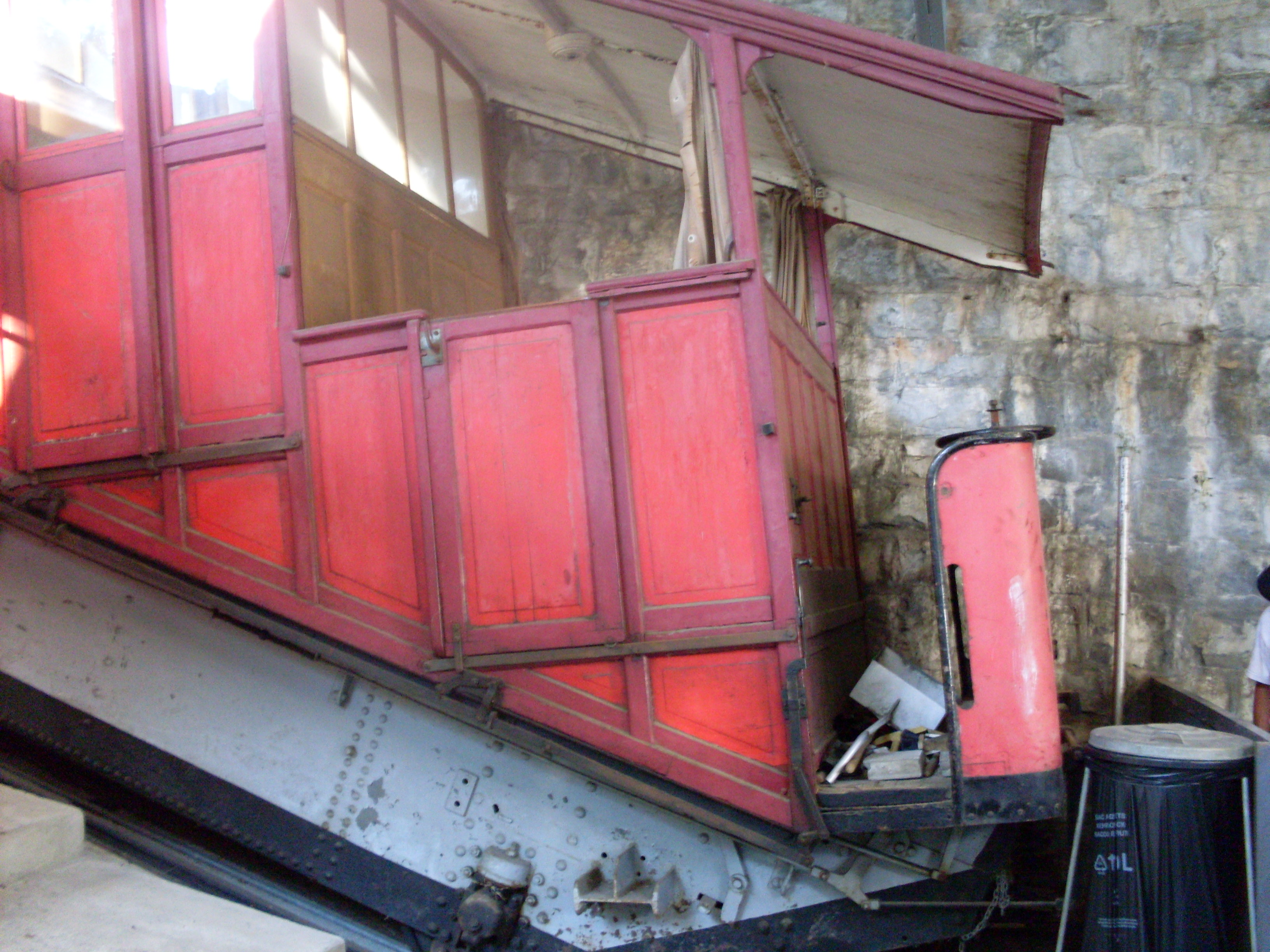
Old car out of service since 1975

The Territet–Glion funicular railway (French: Chemin de fer funiculaire Territet–Glion) is a funicular in Switzerland, which runs between the Territet and Glion suburbs of the town of Montreux. At its upper terminus, the funicular connects with the Montreux–Glion–Rochers-de-Naye railway line.

== History ==
The line was opened in 1883, making it one of the oldest funiculars in Switzerland (the Giessbachbahn, opened in 1879, is the oldest). It was built to 1,000 mm (3 ft 3 3/8 in) metre gauge with two separate and adjacent tracks which spread apart to allow passing at the halfway point. The stations had two side platforms.

The Chemin de fer Glion-Rochers-de-Naye opened a line from Rochers de Naye to Glion in 1892, connecting with the upper terminus of the funicular. In 1909, the Chemin de fer Montreux-Glion built from Glion to Montreux, completing the Montreux–Glion–Rochers-de-Naye railway line. Those two railway companies merged in 1987 to become the Chemin de fer Montreux-Glion-Rochers-de-Naye, and that company merged with the Chemin de fer funiculaire Territet–Glion in 1992 to create the Chemin de fer Montreux-Territet-Glion-Rochers-de-Naye. That company, in turn, was one of four that merged in 2001 to create the Transports Montreux-Vevey-Riviera (MVR).

Up to 1973 the railway operated by gravity alone: Both cars had a water tank under their decks and the one at the upper station was filled with water while the one at the lower station (Territet) was dumping its contents in Lake Geneva (Lac Leman). Once the fill-dump process and passenger boarding were complete the brakes were gradually released and since both cars were attached by a single cable passing over a pulley arrangement at Glion, the heavier car descended the slope carrying up the lighter car. The process was then repeated so the car uphill was always filled and the one downhill always empty and thus pulled uphill when brakes were released. A Riggenbach-type rack-and-pinion system in the center of the track provided a non-slip braking system. The trackway had two side-by-side tracks, one for each of the ascending and descending cars, that shared a central rail until they diverged in the center of the route to pass. An added picturesque note was that the two car operators were communicating for synchronisation with whistles instead of an intercom or similar device. The modern system uses electric traction.

With rebuilding the line adapted the more conventional approach in which only a single track is used, the two rails opening at the halfway point to form a passing loop. This allows each car to have doors on only one side, so only one flanking (side) platform is in use at each station; the second platform which was originally used can still be seen.

The funicular was closed from 8 June to 2 October 2009 for maintenance work to be carried out and the two cars were taken to the MOB workshops at Chernex for attention and repainting in the new "Golden Pass" livery. A certain amount of rewiring was carried out along with a metal stairway on one side of the track (right hand side when going up) for the full length of the line being erected. Work was also carried out on the station shelters including a replacement roof.

The two cars, originally painted in an all-over red livery, were built by Gangloff AG of Bern. In the 2009 repaint the cars were painted in a gold (lower portion) and white (upper portion) livery scheme and rebranded "Golden Pass". The new colours will be applied to the other funiculars in the Golden Pass Group as well as buses and trains, other than the Golden Pass Panoramic and Golden Pass Classic which they operate.

== Services ==
The service, in each direction, commences at 05h25, then at 05h45 and every 15 minutes until 21h15, 21h45 and every 30 minutes until 23h15, 23h50, 00h20 and 00h45. On Saturday and Sunday mornings there is a service at 01h30.

== See also ==
- List of funicular railways
- List of funiculars in Switzerland
- Water counterbalancing
