= Renens VD railway station =

Railway station in Renens, Canton of Vaud, Switzerland

Renens VD
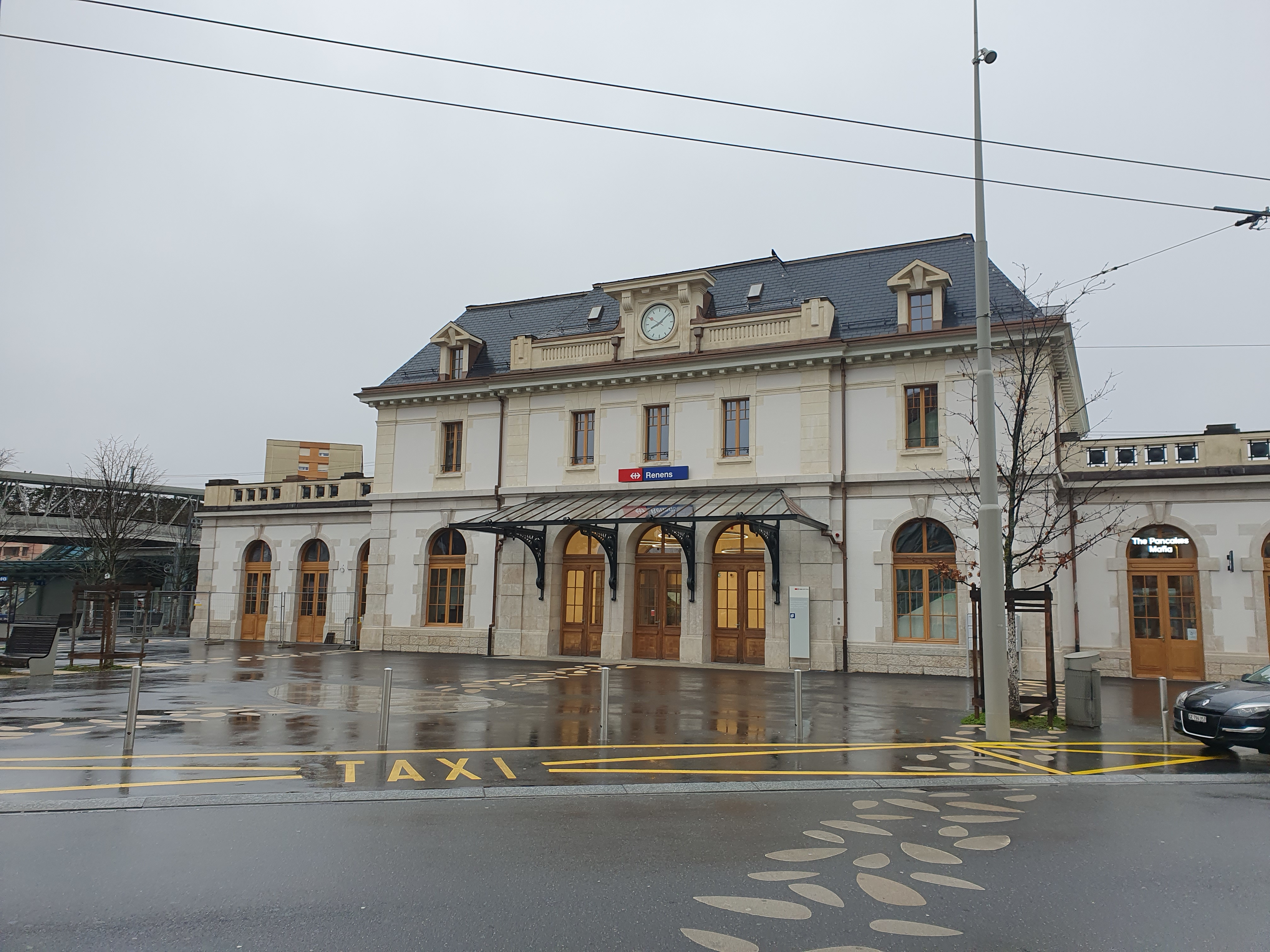
- The station building in 2023

General information
- Location: Place de la Gare; Renens; Switzerland
- Coordinates: 46°32′13″N 6°34′44″E
- Elevation: 415 m (1,362 ft)
- Owner: Swiss Federal Railways
- Lines: Jura Foot line; Lausanne–Geneva line; Simplon line; Metro line M1
- Distance: 4.5 km (2.8 mi) from Lausanne
- Platforms: 6: 3 island platforms; 1 side platforms
- Tracks: 7
- Train operators: Swiss Federal Railways
- Connections: Transports publics de la région lausannoise

Construction
- Parking: Yes
- Cycle facilities: Yes (121 spaces)
- Accessible: Yes
- Architect: Taillens & Dubois (1908)

Other information
- Station code: 8501118 (REN)
- Fare zone: 12 (mobilis) (Greater Lausanne)

History
- Opened: 1855; M1 (1991)

Passengers
- 2025: 47,400 per day (SBB)
- Rank: 14 out of 1,095

Services
Preceding station	SBB CFF FFS	Following station
Genève-Cornavin towards Geneva Airport	IC 1	Lausanne towards St. Gallen
Yverdon-les-Bains towards Zürich Hauptbahnhof, St. Gallen or Rorschach	IC 5	Lausanne Terminus
Yverdon-les-Bains towards Basel SBB	IC 51	Lausanne Terminus
Genève-Cornavin towards Geneva Airport	IR 90	Lausanne towards Brig
Morges towards Annemasse or Geneva Airport	RE33	Lausanne towards St-Maurice or Martigny
Preceding station	RER Vaud	Following station
Bussigny towards Grandson	R1	Prilly-Malley towards Bex
Bussigny towards Grandson	R2	Prilly-Malley towards Bex
Bussigny towards Vallorbe	R3	Prilly-Malley towards Vevey
Bussigny towards Le Brassus or Vallorbe	R4	Prilly-Malley towards Vevey
Denges-Echandens towards Allaman	R8	Lausanne towards Payerne
Lonay-Préverenges towards Allaman	R9	Prilly-Malley towards Murten/Morat
Preceding station	Lausanne Metro	Following station
Terminus	M1	Epenex towards Lausanne-Flon
Location

Renens VD railway station is a railway and metro station in Renens, Vaud, Switzerland, west of the city of Lausanne. It is served by trains of the Swiss Federal Railways (SBB) on the Lausanne–Geneva railway and the M1 metro line in Lausanne (also called TSOL). It is one of the termini of the Lausanne Metro system.

== Layout and connections ==
Renens VD has three island platforms and one side platform. A single island platform serves the Lausanne Metro with two tracks (Nos. 61–62) which terminate at the station. The remaining platforms serve five main-line tracks (Nos. 1–7). Transports publics de la région lausannoise operates bus services from the station.

== Services ==
As of the December 2025 timetable change, the following services call at Renens VD:

- InterCity:
  - hourly service between Geneva Airport and St. Gallen via Zürich Hauptbahnhof.
  - half-hourly service between Lausanne and Biel/Bienne and hourly service to Rorschach and Basel SBB.
- RegioExpress: half-hourly service (hourly on weekends) between Annemasse and St-Maurice, and hourly service from St-Maurice to Martigny. On weekends, hourly service to Geneva Airport.
- InterRegio: hourly service between Geneva Airport and Brig.
- RER Vaud:
  - R1 / R2: half-hourly service between Grandson and Cully.
  - R3 / R4: half-hourly (hourly on weekends) service between Vallorbe and Bex; hourly service to Le Brassus; limited service from Bex to St-Maurice.
  - R8 / R9: half-hourly service between Allaman and Payerne, with every other train continuing from Payerne to Murten/Morat.

== Gallery ==
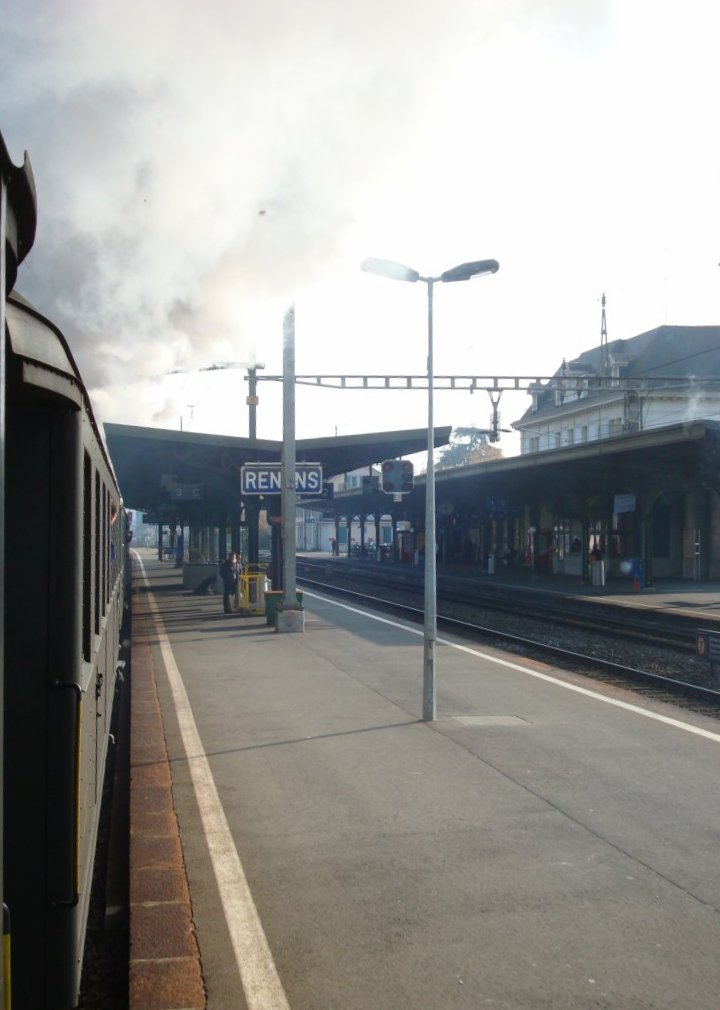

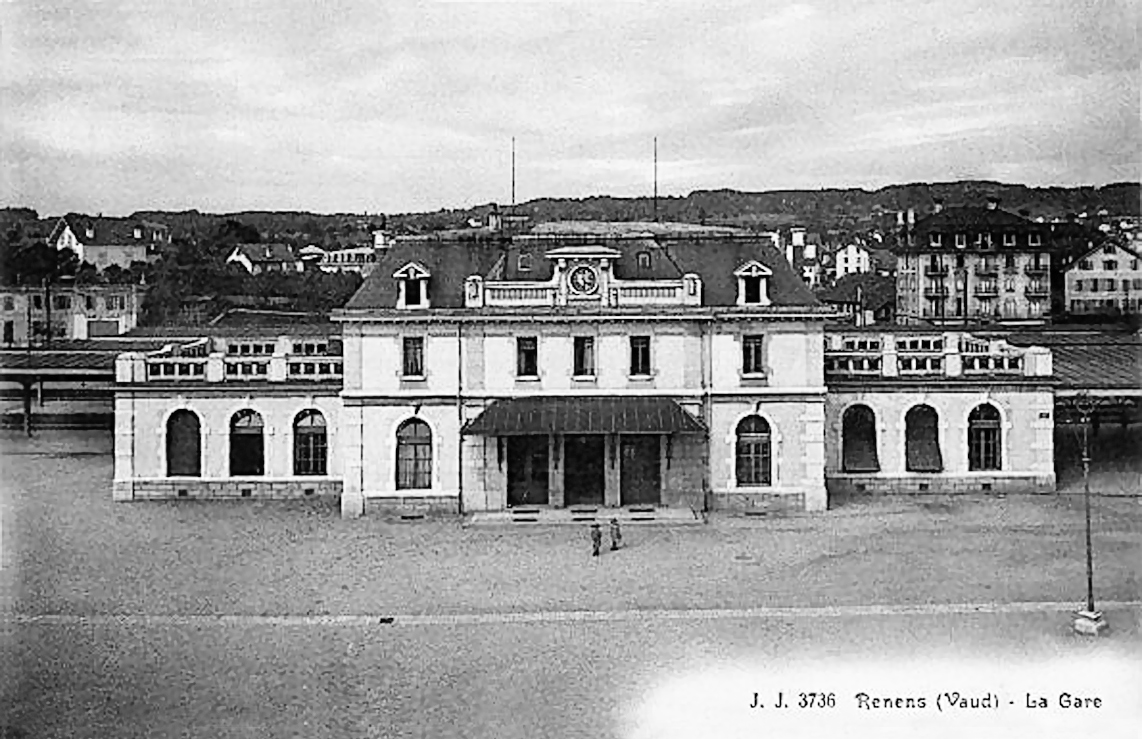
reception building, opened 1908
