= Bussigny railway station =

Railway station in Bussigny, Switzerland

Bussigny
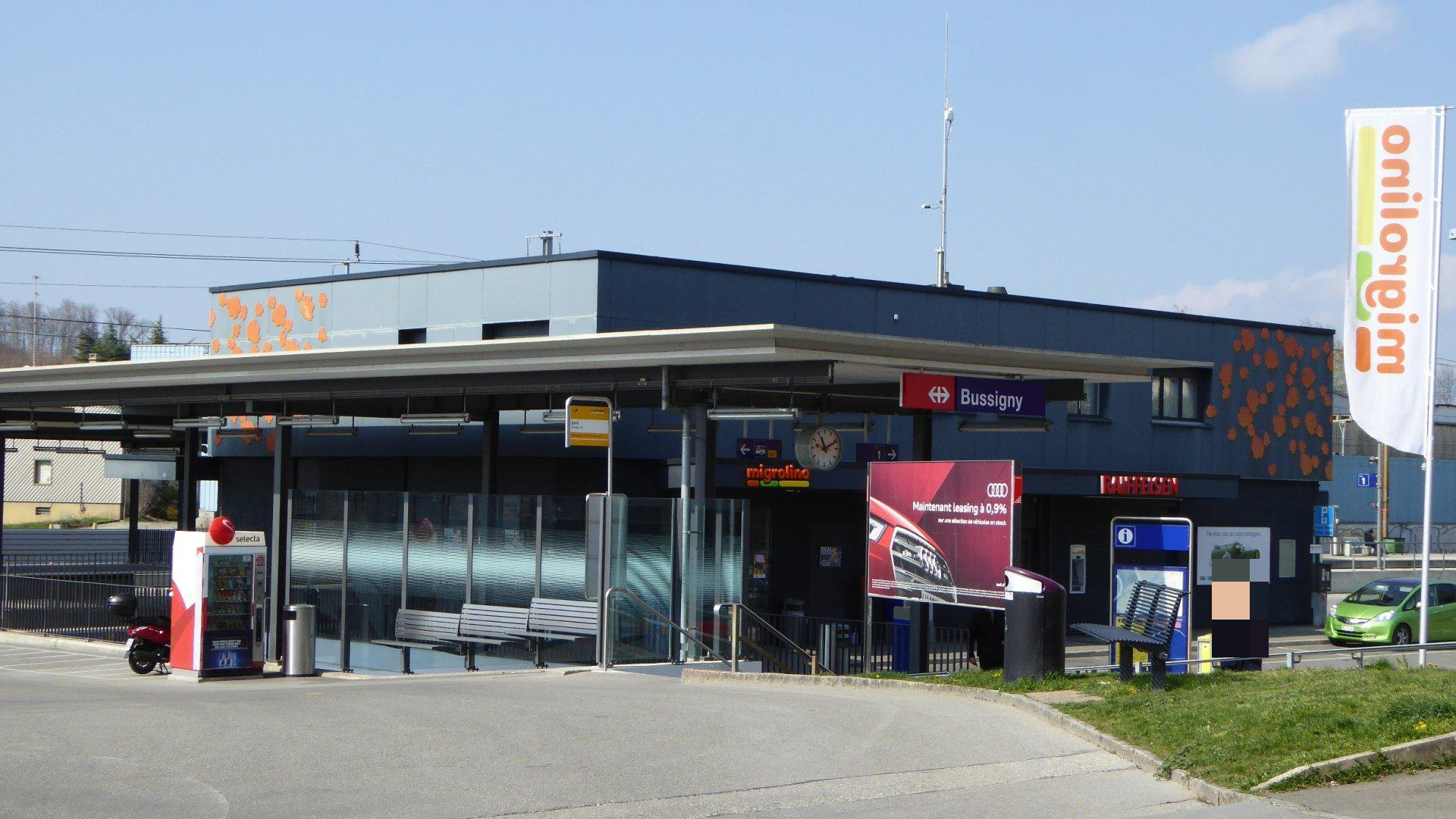
- The platform shelter in 2019

General information
- Location: Bussigny; Switzerland
- Coordinates: 46°32′51″N 6°33′07″E
- Elevation: 406 m (1,332 ft)
- Owner: Swiss Federal Railways
- Lines: Jura Foot line; Simplon line
- Distance: 6.9 km (4.3 mi) from Lausanne
- Platforms: 3; 1 island platform; 1 side platform
- Tracks: 5
- Train operators: Swiss Federal Railways
- Connections: MBC buses; tl buses

Construction
- Parking: Yes (70 spaces)
- Cycle facilities: Yes (33 spaces)
- Accessible: Yes

Other information
- Station code: 8501117 (BY)
- Fare zone: 15 (mobilis)

Passengers
- 2023: 5'400 per weekday (SBB)

Services
Preceding station	RER Vaud	Following station
Vufflens-la-Ville towards Grandson	R1	Renens VD towards Bex
Vufflens-la-Ville towards Grandson	R2	Renens VD towards Bex
Cossonay-Penthalaz towards Vallorbe	R3	Renens VD towards Vevey
Cossonay-Penthalaz towards Le Brassus or Vallorbe	R4	Renens VD towards Vevey
Location

Bussigny railway station (French: Gare de Bussigny) is a railway station in the municipality of Bussigny, in the Swiss canton of Vaud. It is an intermediate stop on multiple standard gauge lines of Swiss Federal Railways.

== Services ==
As of the December 2024 timetable change, the following services stop at Bussigny:

- RER Vaud:
  - R1 / R2: half-hourly service between Grandson and Cully.
  - R3 / R4: half-hourly (hourly on weekends) service between Vallorbe and Bex; hourly service to Le Brassus; limited service from Bex to St-Maurice.
