= Cossonay-Penthalaz railway station =

Railway station in Penthalaz, Switzerland

Cossonay-Penthalaz
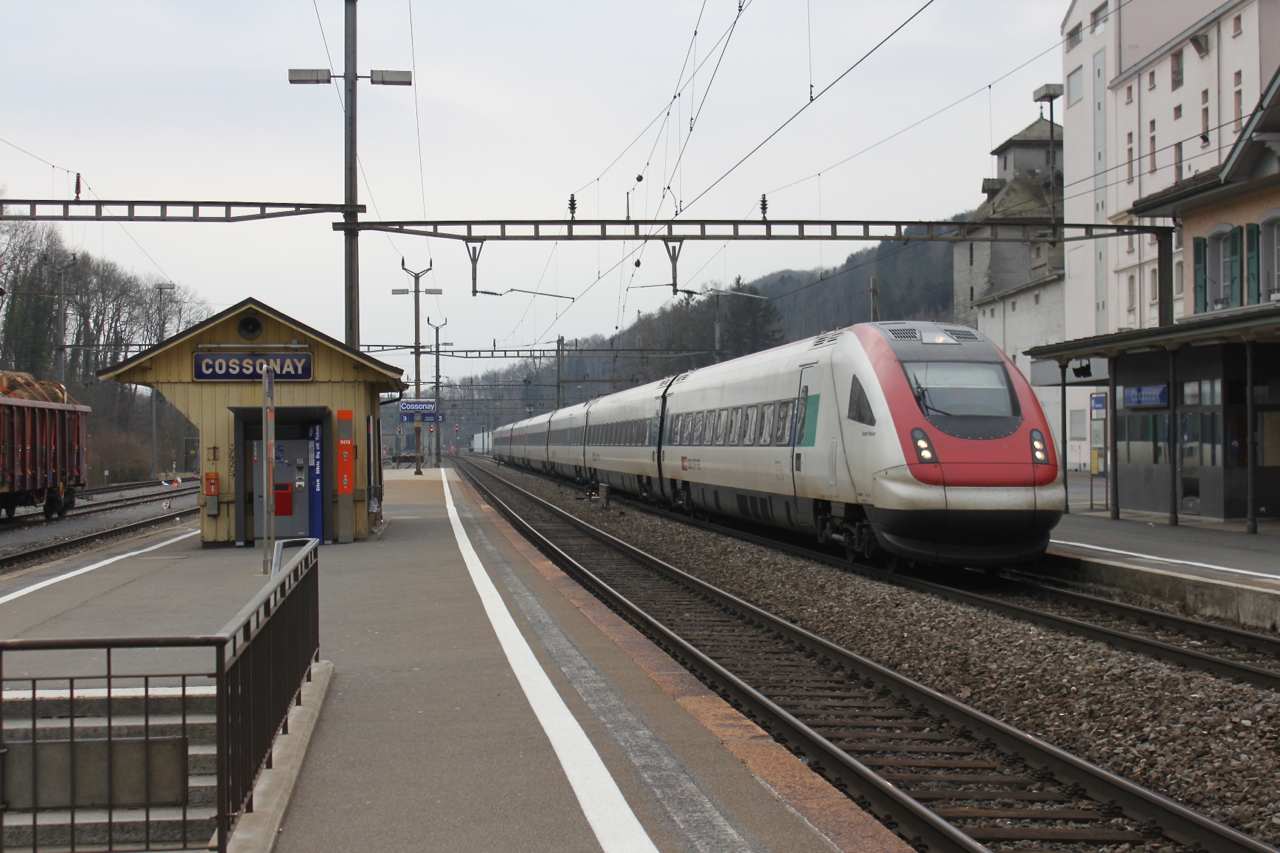
- SBB RABDe 500 passes through the station in 2010

General information
- Location: Penthalaz; Switzerland
- Coordinates: 46°36′22″N 6°31′25″E
- Elevation: 427 m (1,401 ft)
- Owner: Swiss Federal Railways
- Lines: Jura Foot line; Simplon line
- Distance: 14.5 km (9.0 mi) from Lausanne
- Platforms: 3; 1 island platform; 1 side platform
- Tracks: 4
- Train operators: Swiss Federal Railways
- Connections: Cossonay–Gare–Ville funicular; MBC buses; tl bus line; CarPostal Suisse buses

Construction
- Parking: Yes (30 spaces)
- Cycle facilities: Yes (37 spaces)
- Accessible: Yes

Other information
- Station code: 8501115 (COS)
- Fare zone: 44 (mobilis)

History
- Former names: Penthalaz-Cossonay (until 1913), Cossonay (until 2014)

Passengers
- 2023: 4'100 per weekday (SBB)

Services
Preceding station	RER Vaud	Following station
Eclépens towards Grandson	R1	Vufflens-la-Ville towards Bex
Eclépens towards Grandson	R2	Vufflens-la-Ville towards Bex
La Sarraz towards Vallorbe	R3	Bussigny towards Vevey
La Sarraz towards Le Brassus or Vallorbe	R4	Bussigny towards Vevey
Location

Cossonay-Penthalaz railway station (French: Gare de Cossonay-Penthalaz) is a railway station in the municipality of Penthalaz, in the Swiss canton of Vaud. It is an intermediate stop on multiple standard gauge lines of Swiss Federal Railways. The station is adjacent to the valley station of the Cossonay–Gare–Ville funicular.

== Services ==
As of the December 2024 timetable change, the following services stop at Cossonay-Penthalaz:

- RER Vaud:
  - R1 / R2: half-hourly service between Grandson and Cully.
  - R3 / R4: half-hourly (hourly on weekends) service between Vallorbe and Bex; hourly service to Le Brassus; limited service from Bex to St-Maurice.
