= Vufflens-la-Ville railway station =

Railway station in Vufflens-la-Ville, Vaud, Switzerland

Vufflens-la-Ville
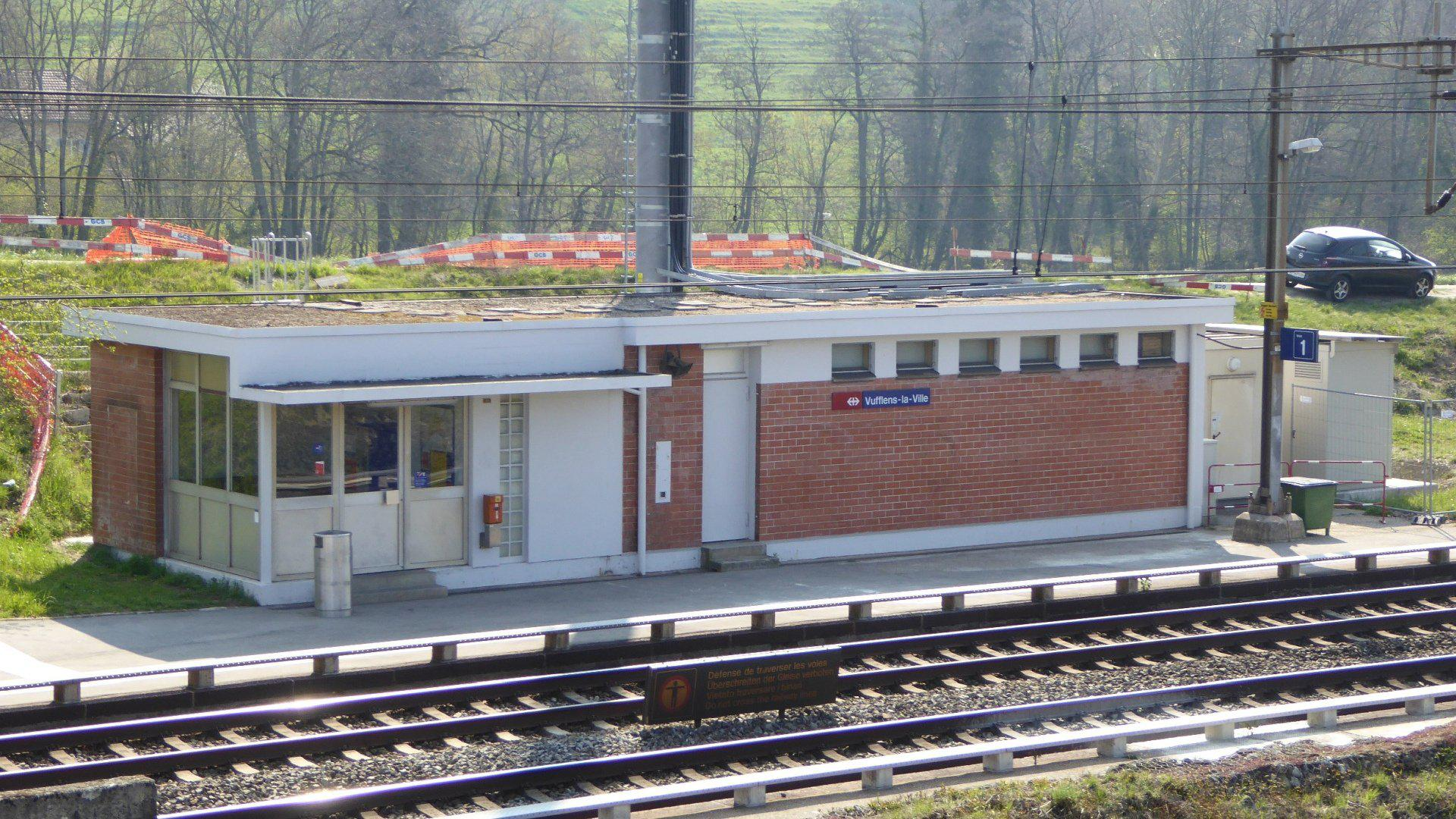
- The station in 2019

General information
- Location: Vufflens-la-Ville; Switzerland
- Coordinates: 46°34′34″N 6°31′51″E
- Elevation: 406 m (1,332 ft)
- Owner: Swiss Federal Railways
- Lines: Jura Foot line; Simplon line
- Distance: 11.0 km (6.8 mi) from Lausanne
- Platforms: 2 (2 side platforms)
- Tracks: 2
- Train operators: Swiss Federal Railways
- Connections: tl bus line

Construction
- Cycle facilities: Yes (12 spaces)
- Accessible: No

Other information
- Station code: 8501116 (VU)
- Fare zone: 15 (mobilis)

Passengers
- 2023: 610 per weekday (SBB)

Services
Preceding station	RER Vaud	Following station
Cossonay-Penthalaz towards Grandson	R1	Bussigny towards Bex
Cossonay-Penthalaz towards Grandson	R2	Bussigny towards Bex
Location

Vufflens-la-Ville railway station (French: Gare de Vufflens-la-Ville) is a railway station in the municipality of Vufflens-la-Ville, in the Swiss canton of Vaud. It is an intermediate stop on multiple standard gauge lines of Swiss Federal Railways.

== Services ==
As of the December 2024 timetable change, the following services stop at Vufflens-la-Ville:

- RER Vaud R1 / R2: half-hourly service between Grandson and Cully.
