= La Sarraz railway station =

Railway station in La Sarraz, Switzerland

La Sarraz
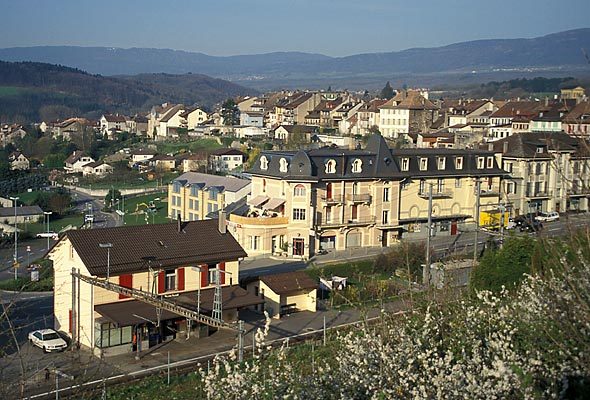
- The station building in 2008

General information
- Location: La Sarraz; Switzerland
- Coordinates: 46°39′32″N 6°31′03″E
- Elevation: 484 m (1,588 ft)
- Owner: Swiss Federal Railways
- Line: Simplon line
- Distance: 22.8 km (14.2 mi) from Lausanne
- Platforms: 2 side platforms
- Tracks: 2
- Train operators: Swiss Federal Railways
- Connections: MBC buses; CarPostal Suisse bus line

Construction
- Parking: Yes (28 spaces)
- Cycle facilities: Yes (25 spaces)
- Accessible: Yes

Other information
- Station code: 8501108 (LSA)
- Fare zone: 49 (mobilis)

Passengers
- 2023: 1'400 per weekday (SBB)

Services
Preceding station	RER Vaud	Following station
Arnex towards Vallorbe	R3	Cossonay-Penthalaz towards Vevey
Arnex towards Le Brassus or Vallorbe	R4	Cossonay-Penthalaz towards Vevey
Location

La Sarraz railway station (French: Gare de La Sarraz) is a railway station in the municipality of La Sarraz, in the Swiss canton of Vaud. It is an intermediate stop on the standard gauge Simplon line of Swiss Federal Railways.

== Services ==
As of the December 2024 timetable change, the following services stop at La Sarraz:

- RER Vaud R3 / R4: half-hourly (hourly on weekends) service between Vallorbe and Bex; hourly service to Le Brassus; limited service from Bex to St-Maurice.
