= Bavois railway station =

Railway station in Bavois, Switzerland

Bavois
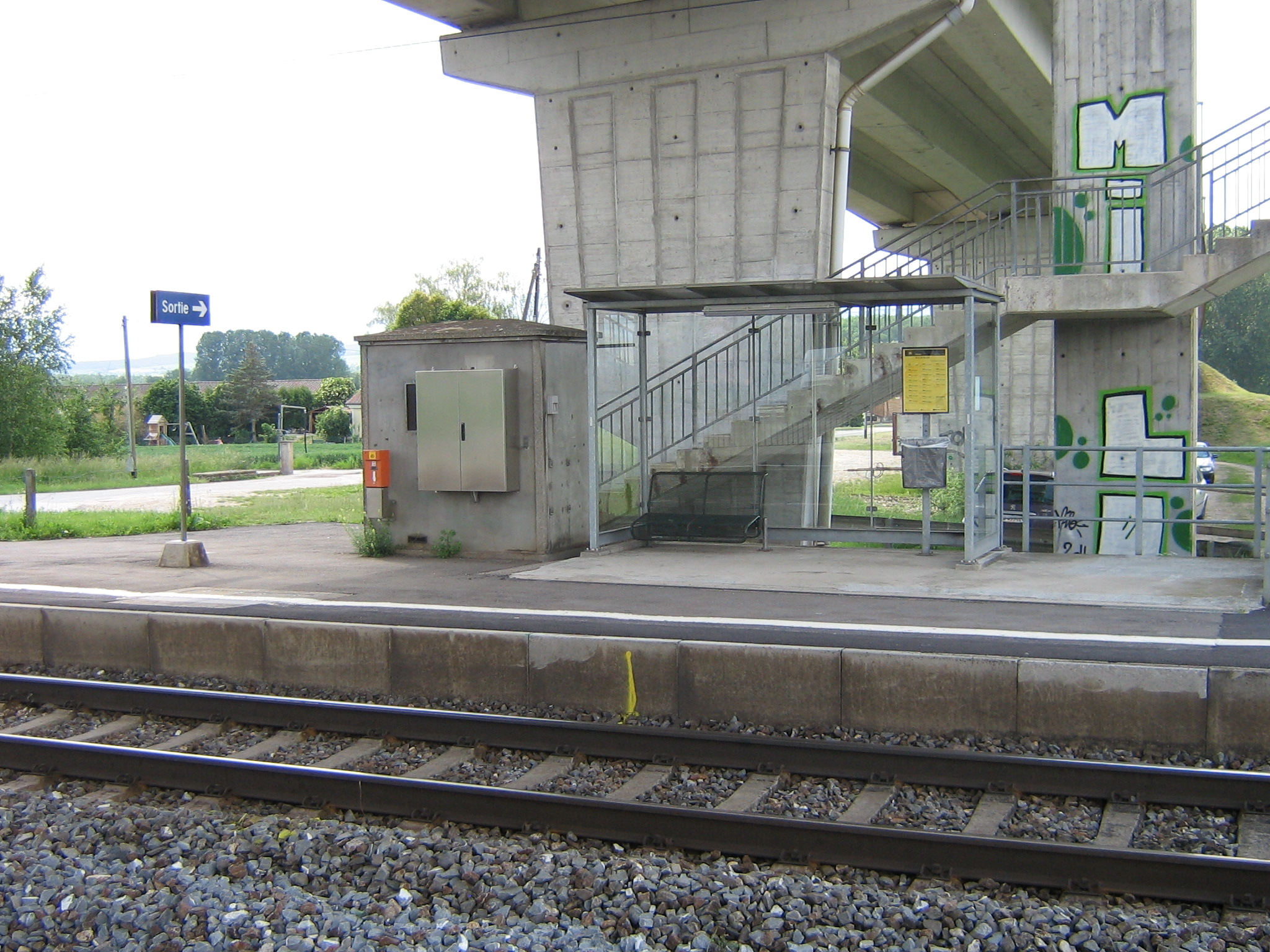
- The station platform beneath the overpass in 2012

General information
- Location: Bavois; Switzerland
- Coordinates: 46°41′16″N 6°33′34″E
- Elevation: 441 m (1,447 ft)
- Owner: Swiss Federal Railways
- Line: Jura Foot line
- Distance: 24.9 km (15.5 mi) from Lausanne
- Platforms: 2 (2 side platform)
- Tracks: 2
- Train operators: Swiss Federal Railways

Construction
- Parking: Yes (40 spaces)
- Accessible: No

Other information
- Station code: 8501113 (BAV)
- Fare zone: 43 and 45 (mobilis)

Passengers
- 2023: 200 per weekday (SBB)

Services
| Preceding station | RER Vaud | Following station |
|---|---|---|
| Chavornay towards Grandson | R1 | Eclépens towards Bex |
| Chavornay towards Grandson | R2 | Eclépens towards Bex |
Location

Bavois railway station (French: Gare de Bavois) is a railway station in the municipality of Bavois, in the Swiss canton of Vaud. It is an intermediate stop on the standard gauge Jura Foot line of Swiss Federal Railways.

== Services ==
As of the December 2024 timetable change, the following services stop at Bavois:

- RER Vaud R1 / R2: half-hourly service between Grandson and Cully.
