= Ependes VD railway station =

Railway station in Ependes, Canton of Vaud, Switzerland

Ependes VD
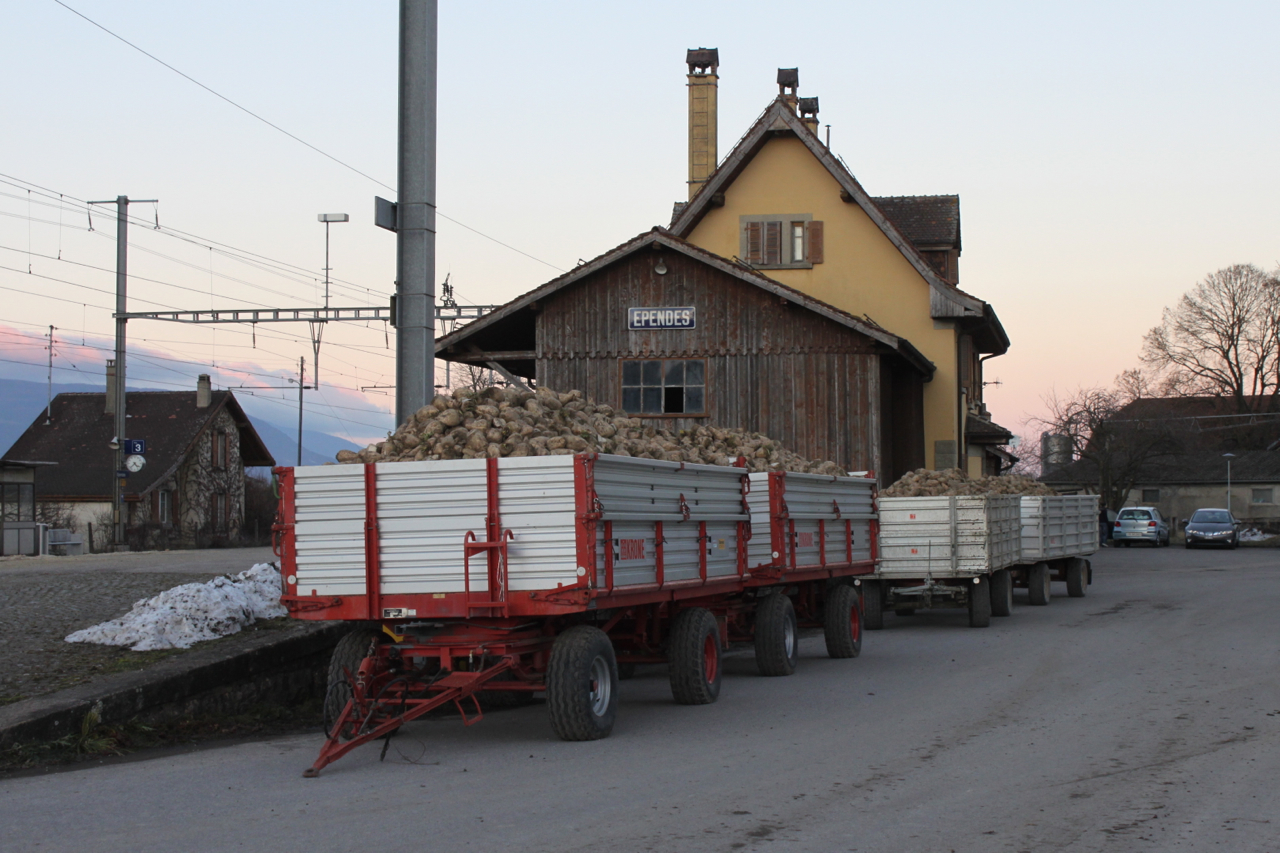
- The station in 2010, during the sugar beet harvest

General information
- Location: Épendes; Switzerland
- Coordinates: 46°44′47″N 6°36′28″E
- Elevation: 439 m (1,440 ft)
- Owner: Swiss Federal Railways
- Line: Jura Foot line
- Distance: 32.7 km (20.3 mi) from Lausanne
- Platforms: 2 (2 side platform)
- Tracks: 2
- Train operators: Swiss Federal Railways

Construction
- Parking: Yes (35 spaces)
- Cycle facilities: Yes (15 spaces)
- Accessible: No

Other information
- Station code: 8501110 (EP)
- Fare zone: 41 (mobilis)

History
- Former names: Ependes (until 2020)

Passengers
- 2023: 120 per weekday (SBB)

Services
Preceding station	RER Vaud	Following station
Yverdon-les-Bains towards Grandson	R2	Chavornay towards Bex
Location

Ependes VD railway station (French: Gare d'Ependes VD) is a railway station in the municipality of Épendes, in the Swiss canton of Vaud. It is an intermediate stop on the standard gauge Jura Foot line of Swiss Federal Railways.

== History ==
Ependes railway station was inaugurated in 1855 with the opening of the Bussigny to Yverdon-les-Bains section of the Jura Foot line. The current passenger building was built in 1923 and converted in 1959. The guardhouse is the original and has been preserved more or less in its original state.

== Services ==
As of the December 2024 timetable change, the following services stop at Ependes VD:

- RER Vaud R2: hourly service between Grandson and Cully.
