= Vufflens-la-Ville =

- Municipality
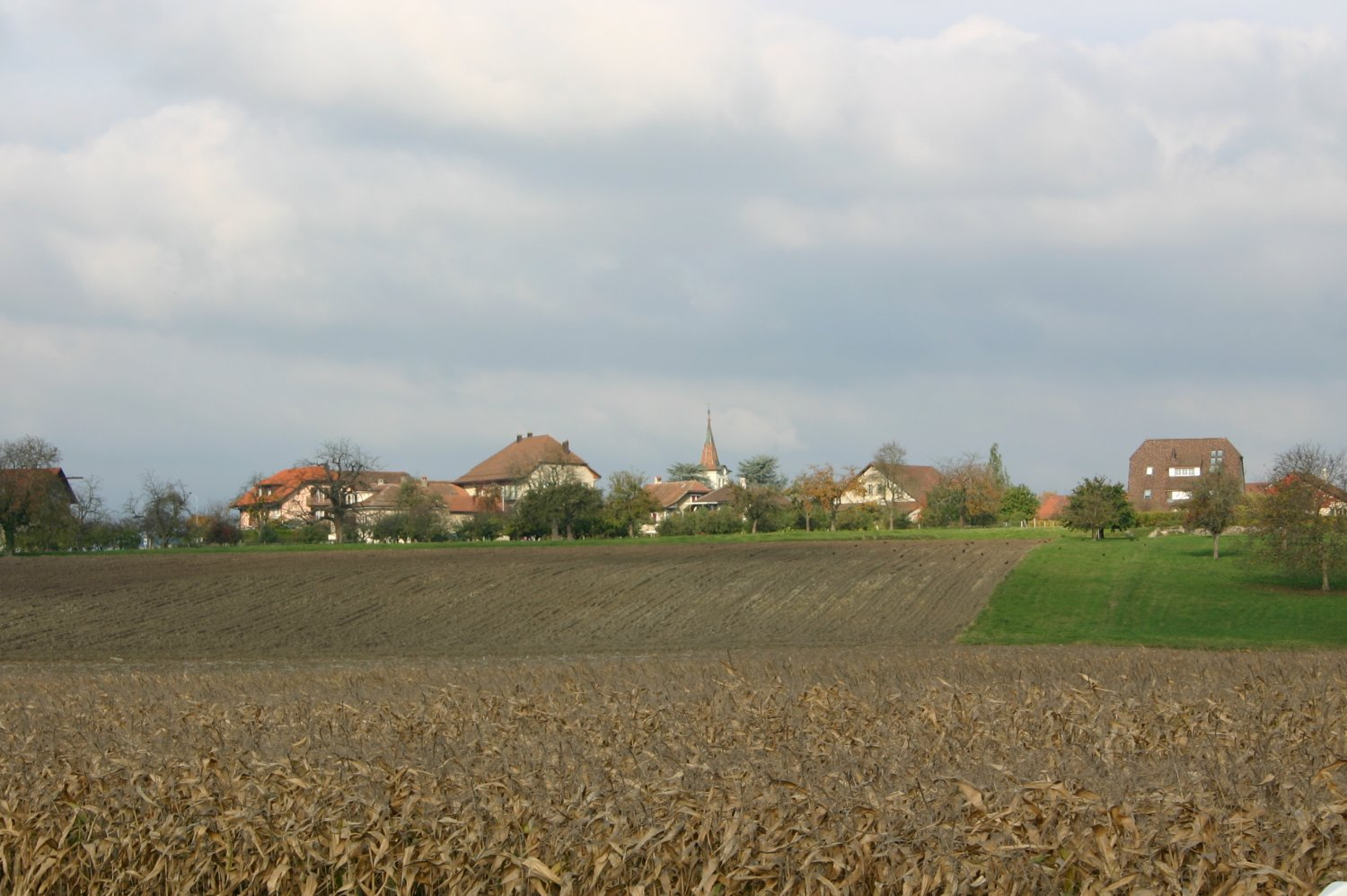
- Vufflens-la-Ville village

- Flag Coat of arms
- Location of Vufflens-la-Ville
- Location within Switzerland Location within Canton of Vaud
- Coordinates: 46°35′N 06°32′E
- Country: Switzerland
- Canton: Vaud
- District: Gros-de-Vaud

Government
  - Mayor: Syndic; Ingrid Rossel

Area
  - Total: 5.38 km^{2} (2.08 sq mi)
- Elevation: 479 m (1,572 ft)

Population (2004)
  - Total: 1,071
  - Density: 199/km^{2} (516/sq mi)
- Demonym(s): Les Vufflanais; Lè Paî-rodzo
- Time zone: UTC+01:00 (CET)
  - Summer (DST): UTC+02:00 (CEST)
- Postal code: 1302
- SFOS number: 5503
- ISO 3166 code: CH-VD
- Surrounded by: Penthaz, Sullens, Mex, Bussigny-près-Lausanne, Aclens, Gollion
- Website: www.vufflens-la-ville.ch

Vufflens-la-Ville is a municipality of the canton of Vaud in Switzerland, located in the district of Gros-de-Vaud.

== Geography ==
Aerial view (1964)

Vufflens-la-Ville has an area, as of 2009, of 5.38 square kilometers (2.08 sq mi). Of this, 3.31 km^{2} (1.28 sq mi) or 61.5% is used for agricultural purposes, while 1.24 km^{2} (0.48 sq mi) or 23.0% is forested. Of the remaining land, 0.73 km^{2} (0.28 sq mi) or 13.6% is settled (buildings or roads), 0.05 km^{2} (12 acres) or 0.9% is either rivers or lakes and 0.05 km^{2} (12 acres) or 0.9% is unproductive land.

Of the built-up area, industrial buildings made up 1.5% of the total area while housing and buildings make up 7.8% and transportation infrastructure made up 3.0%. Twenty-one percent of the total land area is heavily forested and 2% is covered with orchards or small clusters of trees. Of the agricultural land, 50.2% is used for growing crops and 10% is pasture, while 1.3% is used for orchards or vine crops. Of the water in the municipality, 0.2% is in lakes and 0.7% is in rivers and streams.

The municipality was part of the Cossonay District until that district was dissolved on 31 August 2006, and Vufflens-la-Ville became part of the new district of Gros-de-Vaud.

== Coat of arms ==
The blazon of the municipal coat of arms is Per pale: 1. Argent, a Sword Gules; 2. Gules, a Key Argent; overall on a Bend Azure a Lion passant Or.

== Demographics ==
Vufflens-la-Ville has a population (as of December 2020) of 1,351. As of 2008, 13.0% of the population are resident foreign nationals. Over the last 10 years (1999–2009) the population has changed at a rate of 10.2%. It has changed at a rate of 5.3% due to migration and at a rate of 4.5% due to births and deaths.

Most of the population (as of 2000) speaks French (900 or 90.1%), with German being second most common (52 or 5.2%) and Italian being third (17 or 1.7%).

Of the population in the municipality 222 or about 22.2% were born in Vufflens-la-Ville and lived there in 2000. There were 410 or 41.0% who were born in the same canton, while 166 or 16.6% were born somewhere else in Switzerland, and 180 or 18.0% were born outside of Switzerland.

In 2008 there were 12 live births to Swiss citizens and 1 birth to non-Swiss citizens, and in same time span there were 3 deaths of Swiss citizens. Ignoring immigration and emigration, the population of Swiss citizens increased by 9 while the foreign population increased by 1. There were 4 Swiss men and 4 Swiss women who emigrated from Switzerland. At the same time, there were 3 non-Swiss men and 3 non-Swiss women who immigrated from another country to Switzerland. The total Swiss population change in 2008 (from all sources, including moves across municipal borders) was an increase of 41 and the non-Swiss population remained the same. This represents a population growth rate of 3.7%.

The age distribution, as of 2009, in Vufflens-la-Ville is; 140 children or 12.4% of the population are between 0 and 9 years old and 108 teenagers or 9.6% are between 10 and 19. Of the adult population, 112 people or 9.9% of the population are between 20 and 29 years old. 172 people or 15.3% are between 30 and 39, 186 people or 16.5% are between 40 and 49, and 171 people or 15.2% are between 50 and 59. The senior population distribution is 148 people or 13.1% of the population are between 60 and 69 years old, 59 people or 5.2% are between 70 and 79, there are 28 people or 2.5% who are between 80 and 89, and there are 3 people or 0.3% who are 90 and older.

As of 2000, there were 411 people who were single and never married in the municipality. There were 493 married individuals, 50 widows or widowers and 45 individuals who are divorced.

As of 2000, there were 400 private households in the municipality, and an average of 2.5 persons per household. There were 113 households that consist of only one person and 22 households with five or more people. Out of a total of 405 households that answered this question, 27.9% were households made up of just one person and there were 4 adults who lived with their parents. Of the rest of the households, there are 101 married couples without children, 158 married couples with children There were 21 single parents with a child or children. There were 3 households that were made up of unrelated people and 5 households that were made up of some sort of institution or another collective housing.

In 2000 there were 181 single-family homes (or 70.7% of the total) out of a total of 256 inhabited buildings. There were 46 multi-family buildings (18.0%), along with 21 multi-purpose buildings that were mostly used for housing (8.2%) and 8 other use buildings (commercial or industrial) that also had some housing (3.1%). Of the single-family homes 24 were built before 1919, while 7 were built between 1990 and 2000. The greatest number of single-family homes (65) were built between 1971 and 1980. The most multi-family homes (20) were built before 1919 and the next most (8) were built between 1981 and 1990.

In 2000 there were 454 apartments in the municipality. The most common apartment size was 5 rooms of which there were 102. There were 40 single room apartments and 183 apartments with five or more rooms. Of these apartments, a total of 388 apartments (85.5% of the total) were permanently occupied, while 59 apartments (13.0%) were seasonally occupied and 7 apartments (1.5%) were empty. As of 2009, the construction rate of new housing units was 1.8 new units per 1000 residents. The vacancy rate for the municipality, in 2010, was 0.19%.

The historical population is given in the following chart:

== Sights ==
The entire village of Vufflens-la-Ville is designated as part of the Inventory of Swiss Heritage Sites.

== Politics ==
In the 2007 federal election the most popular party was the SVP which received 25.46% of the vote. The next three most popular parties were the SP (18.71%), the FDP (16.63%) and the Green Party (16.47%). In the federal election, a total of 366 votes were cast, and the voter turnout was 48.9%.

== Economy ==
As of 2010, Vufflens-la-Ville had an unemployment rate of 3.8%. As of 2008, there were 17 people employed in the primary economic sector and about 9 businesses involved in this sector. 59 people were employed in the secondary sector and there were 10 businesses in this sector. 134 people were employed in the tertiary sector, with 31 businesses in this sector. There were 561 residents of the municipality who were employed in some capacity, of which females made up 44.2% of the workforce.

In 2008 the total number of full-time equivalent jobs was 150. The number of jobs in the primary sector was 10, all of which were in agriculture. The number of jobs in the secondary sector was 57 of which 10 or (17.5%) were in manufacturing and 47 (82.5%) were in construction. The number of jobs in the tertiary sector was 83. In the tertiary sector; 13 or 15.7% were in wholesale or retail sales or the repair of motor vehicles, 2 or 2.4% were in the movement and storage of goods, 5 or 6.0% were in a hotel or restaurant, 5 or 6.0% were in the information industry, 7 or 8.4% were technical professionals or scientists, 6 or 7.2% were in education and 5 or 6.0% were in health care.

In 2000, there were 59 workers who commuted into the municipality and 463 workers who commuted away. The municipality is a net exporter of workers, with about 7.8 workers leaving the municipality for every one entering. Of the working population, 12.5% used public transportation to get to work, and 70.2% used a private car.

== Religion ==
From the 2000 census, 283 or 28.3% were Roman Catholic, while 527 or 52.8% belonged to the Swiss Reformed Church. Of the rest of the population, there were 8 members of an Orthodox church (or about 0.80% of the population), there was 1 individual who belongs to the Christian Catholic Church, and there were 31 individuals (or about 3.10% of the population) who belonged to another Christian church. There were 7 (or about 0.70% of the population) who were Islamic. There was 1 person who was Buddhist and 5 individuals who belonged to another church. 127 (or about 12.71% of the population) belonged to no church, are agnostic or atheist, and 21 individuals (or about 2.10% of the population) did not answer the question.

== Education ==
In Vufflens-la-Ville about 400 or (40.0%) of the population have completed non-mandatory upper secondary education, and 210 or (21.0%) have completed additional higher education (either university or a Fachhochschule). Of the 210 who completed tertiary schooling, 59.0% were Swiss men, 29.5% were Swiss women, 7.1% were non-Swiss men and 4.3% were non-Swiss women.

In the 2009/2010 school year there were a total of 130 students in the Vufflens-la-Ville school district. In the Vaud cantonal school system, two years of non-obligatory pre-school are provided by the political districts. During the school year, the political district provided pre-school care for a total of 296 children of which 96 children (32.4%) received subsidized pre-school care. The canton's primary school program requires students to attend for four years. There were 77 students in the municipal primary school program. The obligatory lower secondary school program lasts for six years and there were 53 students in those schools.

As of 2000, there were 17 students in Vufflens-la-Ville who came from another municipality, while 150 residents attended schools outside the municipality.

== Transportation ==
The municipality has a railway station, Vufflens-la-Ville, on the Jura Foot and Simplon lines. It has regular service to Vallorbe, Lausanne, Aigle, and Grandson.
