= Bussigny =

Bussigny is the name of several places:

- Bussigny, Vaud, formerly Bussigny-près-Lausanne, Switzerland
  - Bussigny railway station
- Bussigny-sur-Oron, Canton of Vaud, Switzerland
