= Geneva Airport railway station =

Railway station in Geneva, Switzerland

Geneva Airport Genève-Aéroport
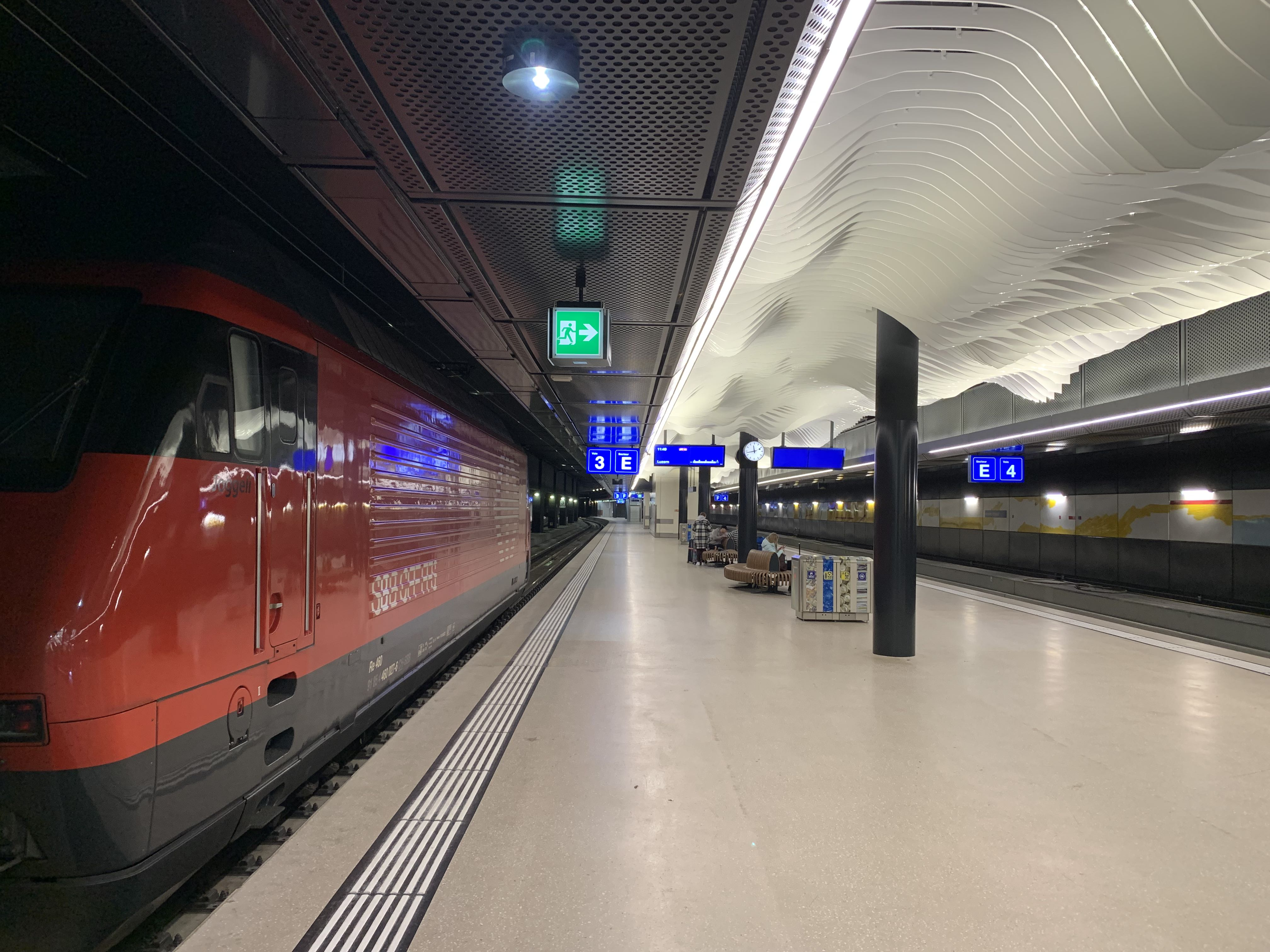
- The underground platforms after the renovation

General information
- Location: Grand-Saconnex; Switzerland
- Coordinates: 46°13′57″N 6°06′43″E
- Elevation: 411 m (1,348 ft)
- Owner: Swiss Federal Railways
- Line: Lausanne–Geneva line
- Distance: 66.2 km (41.1 mi) from Lausanne
- Platforms: 4 (2 island platforms)
- Tracks: 4
- Train operators: Swiss Federal Railways
- Connections: tpg
- Trolleybus: tpg trolleybus
- Bus: tpg buses: Geneva International Airport

Construction
- Structure type: Underground
- Parking: Yes (290 spaces)
- Cycle facilities: Yes (180 spaces)
- Accessible: Yes

Other information
- Station code: 8501026 (GEAP)
- IATA code: GVA
- Fare zone: 10 (unireso)

History
- Opened: 1987

Passengers
- 2025: 16,000 per day (SBB)
- Rank: 52 out of 1,095 (Note: Tied with Burgdorf railway station and Sargans railway station.)

Services
Preceding station	SBB CFF FFS	Following station
Terminus	IC 1	Genève-Cornavin towards St. Gallen
Terminus	IR 15	Genève-Cornavin towards Lucerne
Terminus	IR 57	Genève-Cornavin towards Neuchâtel
Terminus	IR 90	Genève-Cornavin towards Brig
Terminus	IR 95	Genève-Cornavin towards Brig
Terminus	RE33	Genève-Cornavin towards St-Maurice or Martigny
Preceding station	Léman Express	Following station
Terminus	L7	Lancy-Pont-Rouge towards Annemasse
Location
- Location within Switzerland Location within Canton of Geneva

Geneva Airport railway station (French: Gare de Genève-Aéroport) is a train station located underground next to the terminal building of Geneva International Airport (French: Aéroport international de Genève) (IATA code: GVA), in Grand-Saconnex, Geneva, Switzerland. It is located at the end of a branch line on the standard gauge Lausanne–Geneva line of Swiss Federal Railways.

The station is 250 metres (820 ft) away from the airport terminal via a covered walkway, and very close to the Palexpo convention center.

Construction of the station began in 1984, requiring six kilometres of new track between Genève-Cornavin railway station and the new station, with the Lausanne–Geneva railway being upgraded with double track throughout. The train station was opened for normal service on 31 May 1987, after a day of free shuttle trains between Geneva and the airport.

Between September 2020 and December 2022, the station was renovated with a budget of roughly CHF 40,000,000, with new lighting installed, and a ceiling designed to symbolise the Swiss Alps, with sound insulation designed to reduce the noise levels in the station. The height of the platforms was also increased from 42 to 55 cm to allow easier access to the trains.

== Services ==
The station is a terminus station served by an average of four trains an hour. They call at Geneva main station (Genève-Cornavin) (6/7 minutes away) and continue to Lausanne, Neuchâtel, Fribourg, Bern, Lucerne, Zurich, Winterthur, St. Gallen, and/or the Valais Alps (Sion & Brig):

- InterCity
  - (Hourly) to St. Gallen via Renens VD, Lausanne, Fribourg/Freiburg, Bern, Zürich HB, Zürich Airport, and Winterthur
- InterRegio
  - (Hourly) to Lucerne via Nyon, Morges, Lausanne, Palézieux, Romont FR, Fribourg/Freiburg, Bern, Zofingen, and Sursee.
  - (Limited service) to Neuchâtel via Nyon, Gland, Morges and Yverdon-les-Bains.
  - (Hourly) to Brig via Renens VD, Lausanne, Vevey, Montreux, Aigle, St-Maurice, Martigny, Sion, Sierre/Siders and Visp
  - (Hourly) to Brig via Nyon, Morges, Renens VD, Lausanne, Vevey, Montreux, Aigle, Martigny, Sion, Sierre/Siders, Leuk, and Visp
- RegioExpress: on weekends, hourly service to Martigny.
- Léman Express L7: some services to Annemasse via Lancy-Pont-Rouge

== See also ==
- Rail transport in Switzerland
