= Cully railway station =

Railway station in Cully, Switzerland

Cully
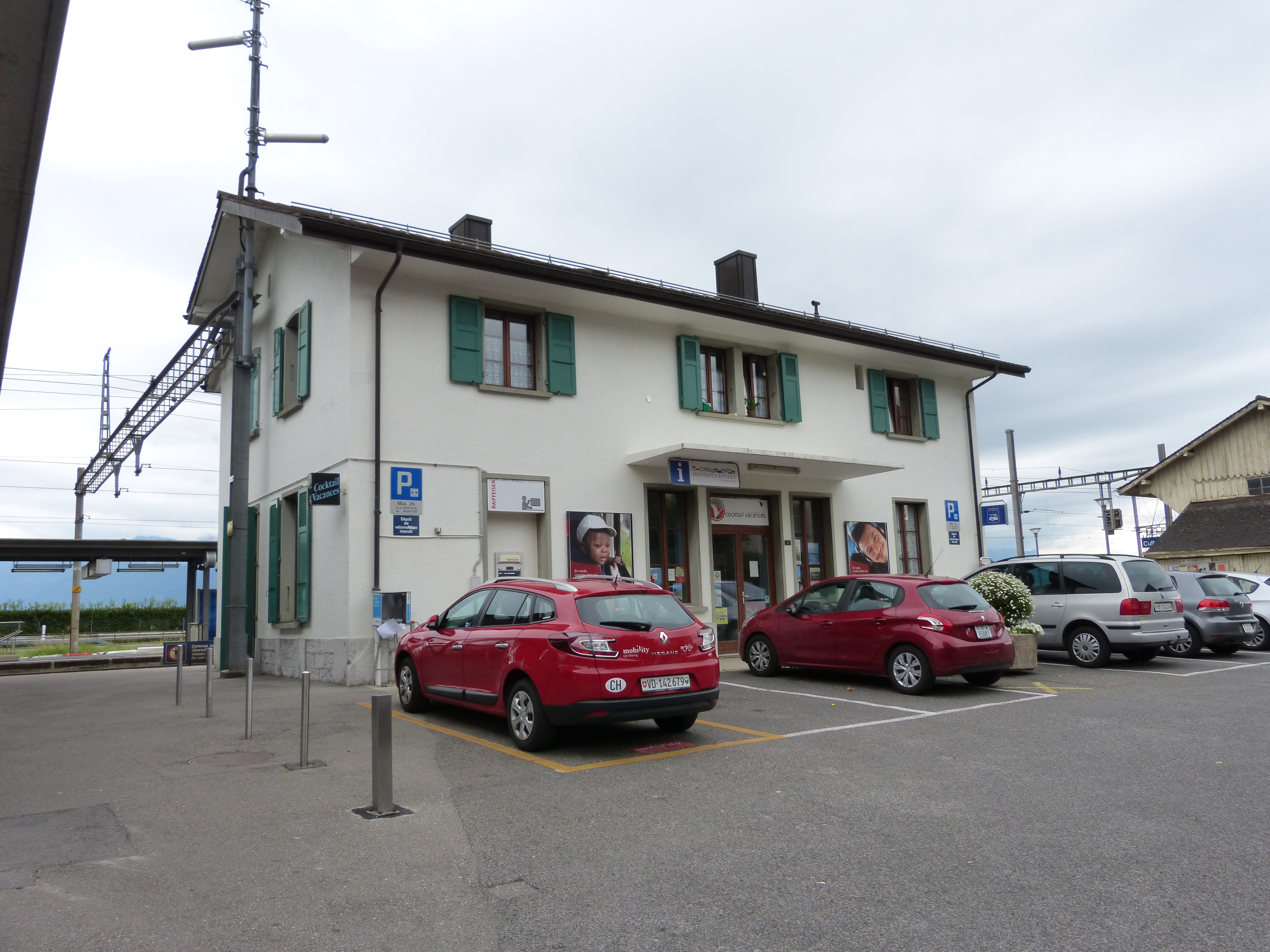
- The station building in 2014

General information
- Location: Cully; Switzerland
- Coordinates: 46°29′19″N 6°43′38″E
- Elevation: 391 m (1,283 ft)
- Owner: Swiss Federal Railways
- Line: Simplon line
- Distance: 8.5 km (5.3 mi) from Lausanne
- Platforms: 3; 1 island platform; 1 side platform
- Tracks: 3
- Train operators: Swiss Federal Railways
- Connections: CarPostal SA buses

Construction
- Parking: Yes (150 spaces)
- Accessible: Yes

Other information
- Station code: 8501124 (CU)
- Fare zone: 19 (mobilis)

Passengers
- 2023: 2'200 per weekday (SBB)

Services
Preceding station	RER Vaud	Following station
Villette VD towards Grandson	R1	Terminus
Villette VD towards Grandson	R2	Terminus
Lutry towards Vallorbe	R3	Vevey Terminus
Lutry towards Le Brassus or Vallorbe	R4	Epesses towards Vevey
Location

Cully railway station (French: Gare de Cully) is a railway station in the locality of Cully, within the municipality of Bourg-en-Lavaux, in the Swiss canton of Vaud. It is an intermediate stop on the standard gauge Simplon line of Swiss Federal Railways.

== Services ==
As of the December 2024 timetable change, the following services stop at Cully:

- RER Vaud:
  - R1 / R2: half-hourly service to Grandson.
  - R3 / R4: half-hourly (hourly on weekends) service between Vallorbe and Bex; hourly service to Le Brassus; limited service from Bex to St-Maurice.
