= R1 (RER Vaud) =

Railway service in Switzerland

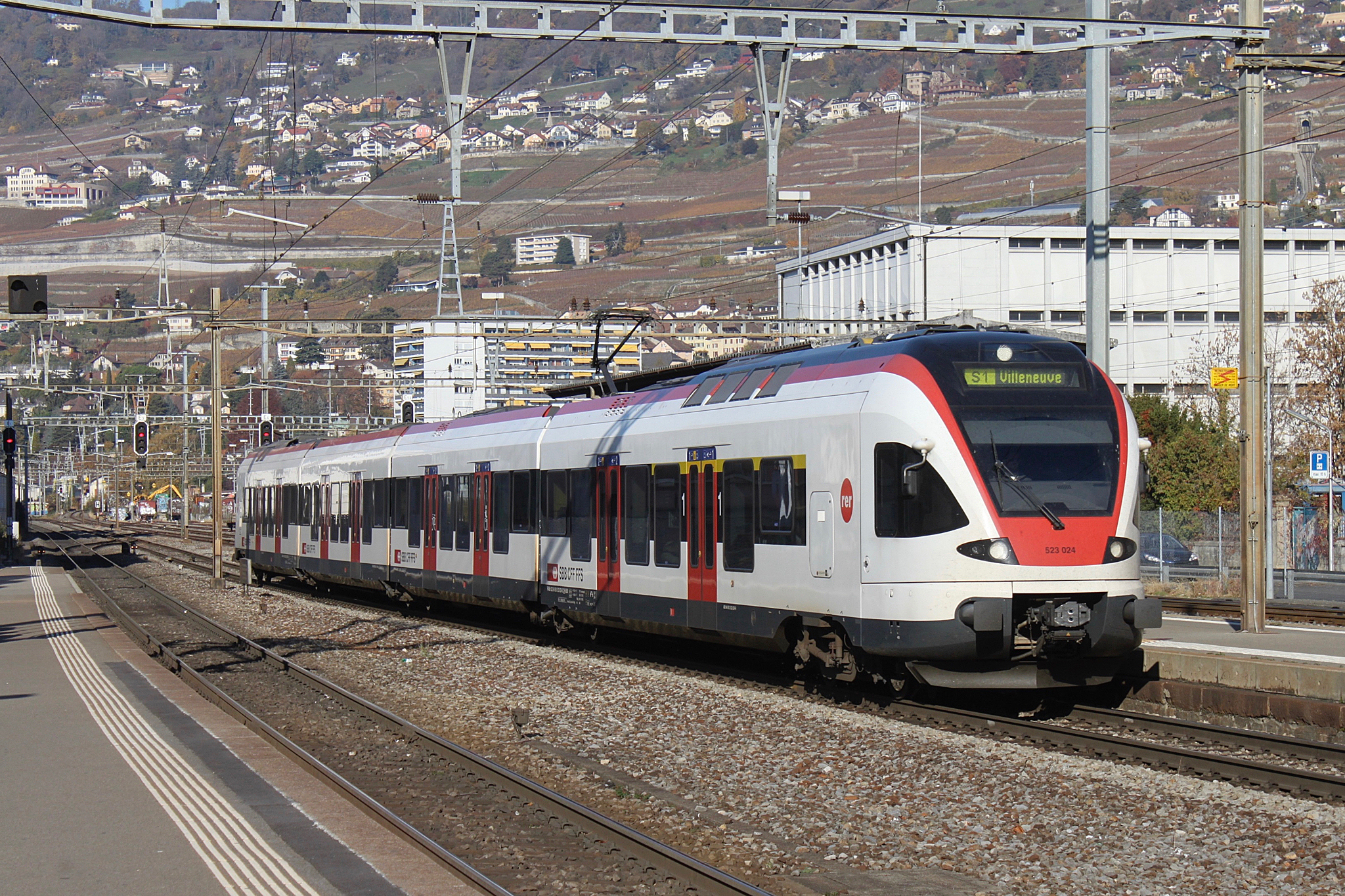
- A Villeneuve-bound S1 at Vevey in 2011

Overview
- First service: 12 December 2004
- Current operator(s): Swiss Federal Railways

Route
- Termini: Grandson; Cully
- Stops: 16
- Distance travelled: 51.2 kilometres (31.8 mi)
- Average journey time: 56 minutes
- Service frequency: Hourly
- Line(s) used: Jura Foot Line; Simplon line

The R1 is a railway service of RER Vaud that provides hourly service between Grandson and Cully in the Swiss canton of Vaud. Swiss Federal Railways, the national railway company of Switzerland, operates the service. The service was previously known as the S1.

== Operations ==
The R1 operates every hour between Grandson and Cully, using the southern portion of the Jura Foot Line and the portion of the Simplon line. It is paired with the R2, providing half-hourly service between the two cities. The R3 and R4 also operate between Cossonay-Penthalaz and Cully, raising the service frequency to every 15 minutes.

== History ==
The S1 was one of the six original lines of the RER Vaud, then called the Vaud Express Network (French: Réseau express vaudois, REV), when that system was established in December 2004. It ran hourly between Yverdon-les-Bains and Villeneuve VD. With the December 2015 timetable change, the northern and southern termini of the S1 changed to Grandson and Lausanne, respectively. The RER Vaud lines were substantially reorganized for the December 2022 timetable change. The S1 was extended from Lausanne to Cully on weekdays. On 10 December 2023, all RER Vaud lines were renamed as "R" and a number, instead of "S".
