= R2 (RER Vaud) =

Railway service in Switzerland

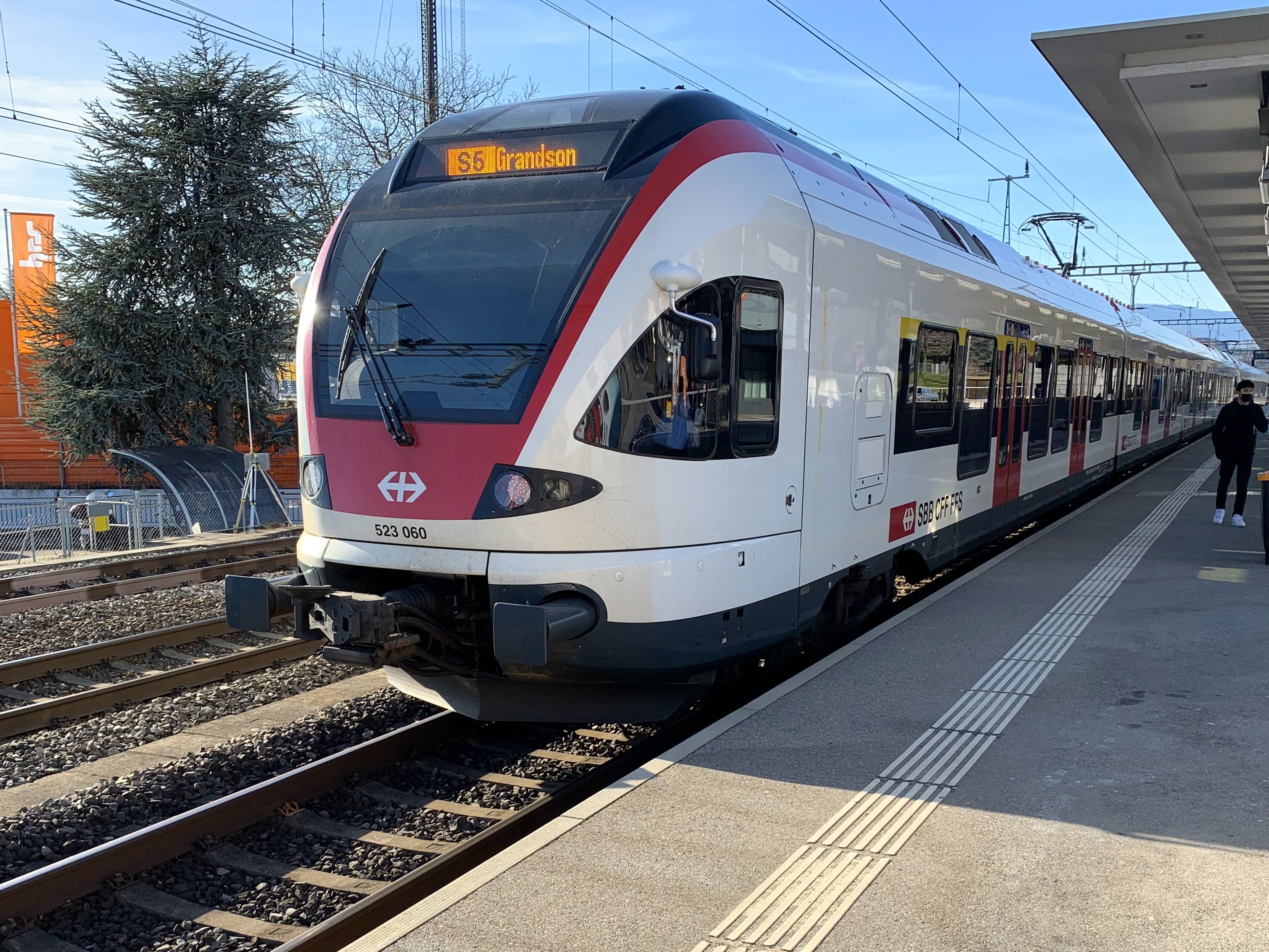
- A Grandson-bound S5 at Bussigny in 2021. The S5 became the S2 in December 2022

Overview
- Predecessor: S5
- First service: 11 December 2022
- Current operator(s): Swiss Federal Railways

Route
- Termini: Grandson; Cully
- Stops: 12
- Distance travelled: 51.2 kilometres (31.8 mi)
- Average journey time: 54 minutes
- Service frequency: Hourly
- Line(s) used: Jura Foot Line; Simplon line

The R2 is a railway service of RER Vaud that provides hourly service between Grandson and Cully in the Swiss canton of Vaud. Swiss Federal Railways, the national railway company of Switzerland, operates the service. Prior to the December 2022 timetable change, the S5 provided a similar service between Grandson and Lausanne, continuing to Aigle. The service was previously known as the S2.

== Operations ==
The R2 operates every hour between Grandson and Cully, using the southern portion of the Jura Foot Line. It is paired with the R1, combining for half-hourly service between Yverdon-les-Bains and Cossonay-Penthalaz. The R3 and R4 also operate between Cossonay-Penthalaz and Cully, raising the service frequency to every 15 minutes.

== History ==
The "first" S2 was one of the six original lines of the RER Vaud, then called the Vaud Express Network (French: Réseau express vaudois, REV), when that system was established in December 2004. It ran hourly between Vallorbe and Palézieux, on the Lausanne–Bern line. With the December 2015 timetable change, the S2's eastern terminus shifted to Villeneuve VD, on the Simplon line. The eastern terminus moved further to Aigle in December 2020.

The RER Vaud lines were substantially reorganized for the December 2022 timetable change. The S2 was shifted to the Jura Foot Line, replacing the S5 between Grandson and Lausanne. Where the S5 had operated to Aigle, with limited service further east, the new S2 terminated in Cully on weekdays and Lausanne at other times. On 10 December 2023, all RER Vaud lines were renamed as "R" and a number, instead of "S". With the December 2024 timetable change, the R2 additionally stops at Eclépens, Bavois and Villette VD combining with the R1 for half-hourly service.
