= St-Maurice railway station =

Railway station in Saint-Maurice, Switzerland

St-Maurice
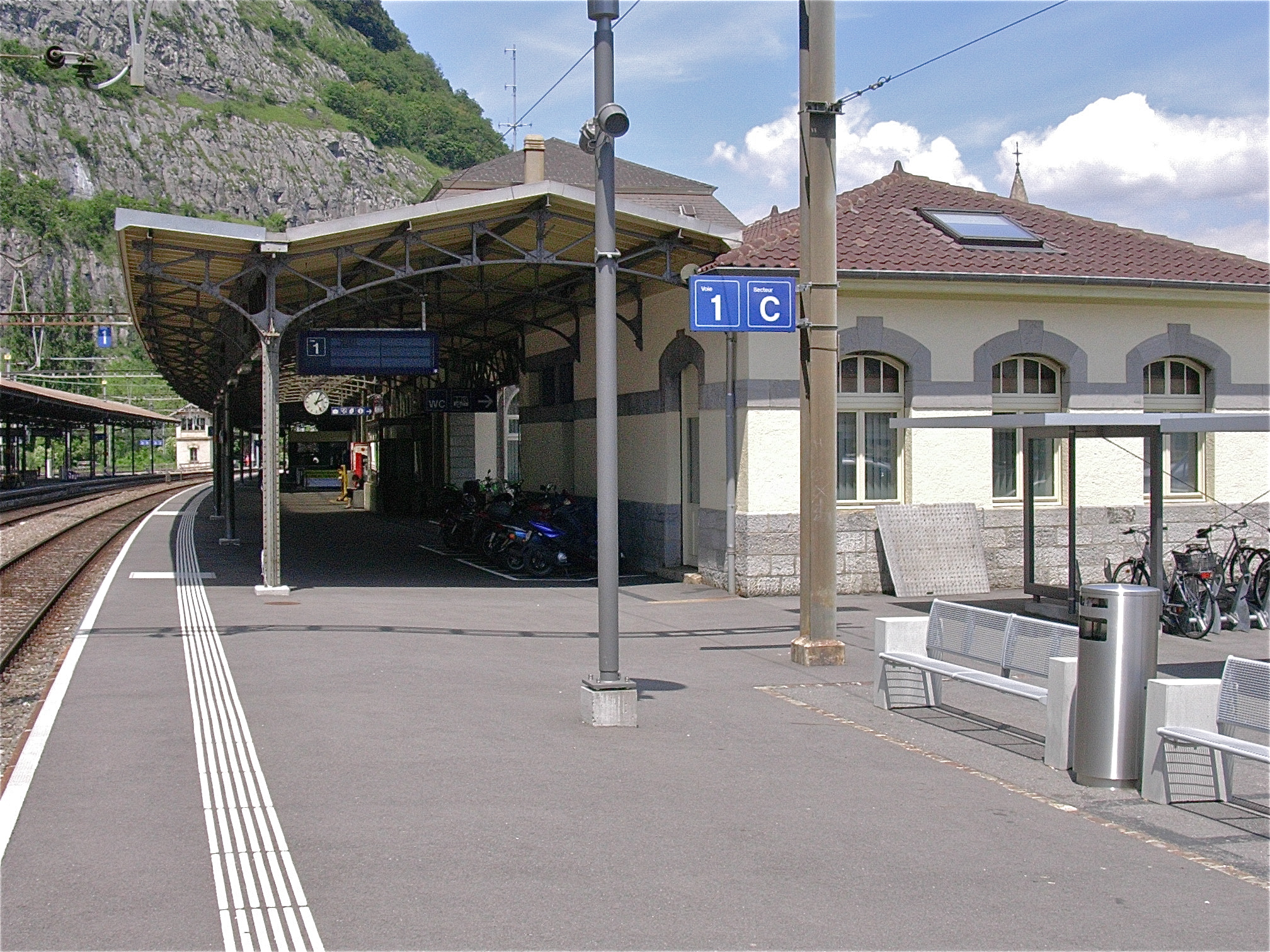
- The station building and platforms in 2013

General information
- Location: Saint-Maurice; Switzerland
- Coordinates: 46°12′59″N 7°00′07″E
- Elevation: 421 m (1,381 ft)
- Owner: Swiss Federal Railways
- Lines: Saint-Gingolph–Saint-Maurice line; Simplon line
- Distance: 51.6 km (32.1 mi) from Lausanne
- Platforms: 5; 1 side platform; 2 island platforms
- Tracks: 6
- Train operators: RegionAlps; Swiss Federal Railways
- Connections: CarPostal SA buses

Construction
- Parking: Yes (57 spaces)
- Cycle facilities: Yes (28 spaces)
- Accessible: Partly

Other information
- Station code: 8501403 (SM)
- Fare zone: 84 and 85 (mobilis)

Passengers
- 2023: 8'200 per weekday (RegionAlps, SBB)

Services
Preceding station	SBB CFF FFS	Following station
Aigle towards Geneva Airport	IR 90	Martigny towards Brig
Bex towards Annemasse or Geneva Airport	RE33	Terminus
Bex towards Annemasse or Geneva Airport	RE33	Martigny Terminus
Bex towards Lausanne	RegioExpress Limited service	Terminus
Preceding station	RER Vaud	Following station
Bex towards Vallorbe	R3 Limited service	Terminus
Bex towards Le Brassus or Vallorbe	R4 Limited service	Terminus
Preceding station	RegionAlps	Following station
Massongex towards St-Gingolph	R91	Evionnaz towards Brig
Massongex towards Monthey	R91	Evionnaz towards Brig
Location

St-Maurice railway station (French: Gare de St-Maurice, German: Bahnhof St-Maurice) is a railway station in the municipality of Saint-Maurice, in the Swiss canton of Valais. It is an intermediate stop on the Simplon line and the terminus of the Saint-Gingolph–Saint-Maurice line.

== Services ==
As of the December 2024 timetable change, the following services stop at St-Maurice:

- InterRegio: hourly service between Geneva Airport and Brig.
- RegioExpress:
  - half-hourly service (hourly on weekends) to Annemasse and hourly service to Martigny. On weekends, hourly service to Geneva Airport.
  - daily morning round-trips on weekdays to Lausanne.
- Regio: half-hourly service between Monthey and Brig, with every other train continuing from Monthey to St-Gingolph.
- RER Vaud R3 / R4: limited service to Le Brassus or Vallorbe.
