= R4 (RER Vaud) =

Railway service in Switzerland

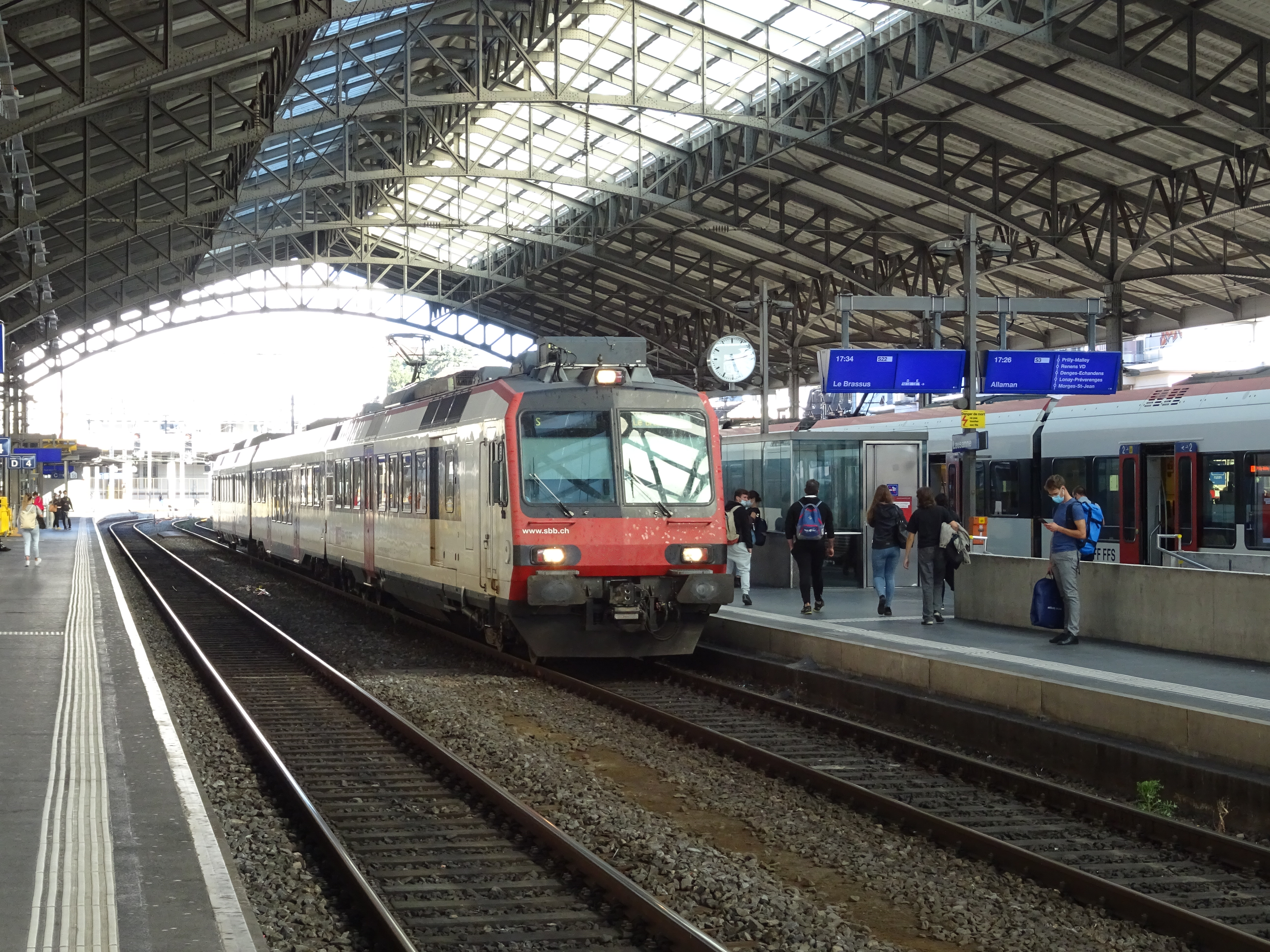
- A Le Brassus-bound S22 at Lausanne in 2021; the S22 was folded in to the S4 in December 2022

Overview
- Predecessor: S2; S22
- First service: 11 December 2022
- Current operator: Swiss Federal Railways

Route
- Termini: Le Brassus; St-Maurice
- Stops: 34
- Distance travelled: 97.9 kilometres (60.8 mi) (Vallorbe–St-Maurice); 115.9 kilometres (72.0 mi) (Le Brassus–St-Maurice)
- Average journey time: 1 hour 40 minutes (Vallorbe–Bex); 2 hours 17 minutes (Le Brassus–Bex); 4 minutes (Bex–St-Maurice)
- Service frequency: Hourly
- Line used: Simplon line

The R4 is a railway service of RER Vaud that provides hourly service between Le Brassus and Vevey in the Swiss canton of Vaud. On weekdays, a section of the train operates from Le Day to Vallorbe. Swiss Federal Railways, the national railway company of Switzerland, operates the service. The service was previously known as the S4.

== Operations ==
The R4 operates every hour between Le Brassus and Vevey, using the western end of the Simplon line. The R4 makes all local stops between Cully and Villeneuve VD. The R4 is paired with the R3 between Le Day and Vevey, providing half-hourly service. On weekdays, a section of the R4 operates between Le Day and Vallorbe.

== History ==
The "first" S4 was one of the six original lines of the RER Vaud, then called the Vaud Express Network (French: Réseau express vaudois, REV), when that system was established in December 2004. It ran hourly between Morges and Palézieux. SBB extended the S4 west from Morges to Allaman with the December 2011 timetable change, making local stops. Rush-hour service to Romont began on 10 December 2017. In December 2021, SBB increased the number of rush-hour round-trips between Allaman and Romont from three to six.

The RER Vaud lines were substantially reorganized for the December 2022 timetable change. The "new" S4 was a combination of the former S2 and S22, making local stops on the Simplon line between Vallorbe and Lausanne, and limited stops between Lausanne and Aigle, with limited service from Aigle to St-Maurice. On 10 December 2023, all RER Vaud lines were renamed as "R" and a number, instead of "S". In December 2024, the R4 was extended from Aigle to Bex, the service from Bex to St-Maurice was taken over by the RE33 service.
