= Lausanne railway station =

Railway station in Lausanne, Switzerland

Lausanne
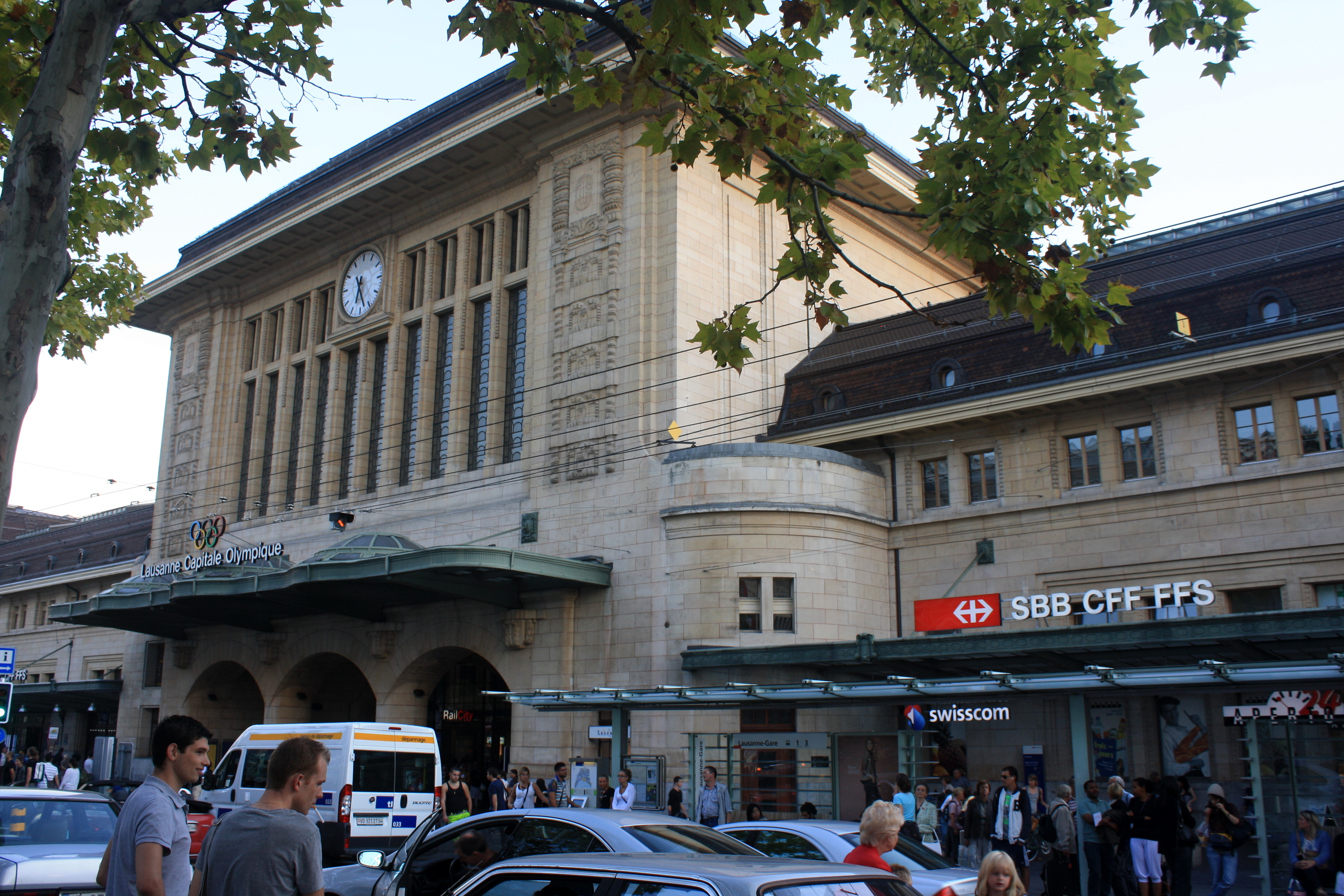
- The main (north) entrance to the station in 2011

General information
- Location: Place de la Gare 5a Lausanne; Switzerland
- Coordinates: 46°31′00″N 6°37′45″E
- Elevation: 447 m (1,467 ft)
- Owner: Swiss Federal Railways
- Lines: Lausanne–Bern line; Lausanne–Geneva line; Simplon line
- Platforms: 8
- Tracks: 10
- Train operators: Swiss Federal Railways; TGV Lyria
- Connections: Transports publics de la région lausannoise buses

Construction
- Structure type: At-grade
- Parking: Yes
- Cycle facilities: 167
- Accessible: Yes

Other information
- Station code: 8501120 (LS)
- IATA code: QLS
- Fare zone: 11 (mobilis)

History
- Opened: 5 May 1856; 170 years ago
- Rebuilt: 1911–1916; 110 years ago (total reconstruction); 1992–1996; 30 years ago

Passengers
- 2025: 97,500 per day (SBB)
- Rank: 6 out of 1,095
Services
Preceding station	SBB CFF FFS	Following station
Genève-Cornavin Terminus	EuroCity	Montreux towards Milano Centrale or Venezia Santa Lucia
Renens VD towards Geneva Airport	IC 1	Fribourg/Freiburg towards St. Gallen
Renens VD towards Zürich Hauptbahnhof, St. Gallen or Rorschach	IC 5	Terminus
Renens VD towards Basel SBB	IC 51	Terminus
Morges towards Geneva Airport	IR 15	Palézieux towards Lucerne
Renens VD towards Geneva Airport	IR 90	Vevey towards Brig
Morges towards Geneva Airport	IR 95	Vevey towards Brig
Renens VD towards Annemasse or Geneva Airport	RE33	Vevey towards St-Maurice or Martigny
Terminus	RegioExpress Limited service	Vevey towards St-Maurice
Preceding station	RER Vaud	Following station
Prilly-Malley towards Grandson	R1	Pully towards Bex
Prilly-Malley towards Grandson	R2	Pully towards Bex
Prilly-Malley towards Vallorbe	R3	Pully towards Vevey
Prilly-Malley towards Le Brassus or Vallorbe	R4	Pully towards Vevey
Renens VD towards Allaman	R8	Puidoux towards Payerne
Prilly-Malley towards Allaman	R9	Puidoux towards Murten/Morat
Terminus	S40	Pully-Nord towards Fribourg/Freiburg
Terminus	S41	Pully-Nord towards Fribourg/Freiburg
Preceding station	TGV Lyria	Following station
Vallorbe towards Paris-Lyon	Paris to Lausanne	Terminus
Genève-Cornavin towards Paris-Lyon	Paris to Lausanne	Terminus
Genève-Cornavin towards Marseille-Saint-Charles	Marseille to Lausanne	Terminus
Preceding station	Lausanne Metro	Following station
Grancy towards Ouchy-Olympique	M2 transfer at Lausanne-Gare	Lausanne-Flon towards Croisettes
Location
- Location within Switzerland Location within Canton of Vaud

Lausanne railway station (French: Gare de Lausanne) is the main intercity and regional railway station for the city of Lausanne, Vaud, Switzerland. It is often known as Lausanne CFF or Lausanne-Gare to distinguish it from the other large station, Lausanne-Flon.

== Description ==
Lausanne is a through station, which sits at the junction of the Simplon, Lausanne–Bern, and Lausanne–Geneva railway lines. Due to this, express passenger trains are available to a wide variety of destinations across the country.

Passenger trains are primarily run by Swiss Federal Railways (SBB CFF FFS), with additional international trains run by companies from neighbouring France (TGV Lyria).

There is also a network of local services from Lausanne, primarily as part of the RER Vaud, and platforms for line 2 of the Lausanne Metro. The metro station, Lausanne-Gare, was opened on 27 October 2008.

Passenger facilities include Bureau de change, left luggage and lost property offices.

== Developments ==
Significant improvements are planned for the station by 2020. A third subway is to be constructed for platform access, along with longer platforms to allow larger trains. A new tunnel is also to be built for the Lausanne Metro directly underneath the Renens (West) end of the main line station, with new metro platforms directly connected to the subway, removing the need for some métro passengers to cross the square in front of the station.

== Services ==
As of the December 2025 timetable change, the following services call at Lausanne:

- TGV Lyria: six trains per day to Paris-Lyon via either Vallorbe or Genève-Cornavin.
- EuroCity: four trains per day between Genève-Cornavin and Milano Centrale, with one train continuing from Milano Centrale to Venezia Santa Lucia.
- InterCity:
  - : hourly service between Geneva Airport and St. Gallen via Bern.
  - /: half-hourly service to Biel/Bienne and hourly service to Rorschach and Basel SBB.
- InterRegio:
- Geneva Airport–Bern–Luzern
- / Geneva Airport–Lausanne–Brig
  - half-hourly service between Geneva Airport and Brig.
  - hourly service between Geneva Airport and Lucerne.
- RegioExpress:
  - half-hourly service (hourly on weekends) between Annemasse and St-Maurice, and hourly service from St-Maurice to Martigny. On weekends, hourly service to Geneva Airport.
  - two daily round-trips on weekdays to St-Maurice.
- RER Vaud:
  - R1 / R2: half-hourly service between Grandson and Cully.
  - R3 / R4: half-hourly (hourly on weekends) service between Vallorbe and Bex; hourly service to Le Brassus; limited service from Bex to St-Maurice.
  - R8 / R9: half-hourly service between Allaman and Payerne, with every other train continuing from Payerne to Murten/Morat.
  - S40 / S41: half-hourly service to Fribourg/Freiburg.

== Gallery ==
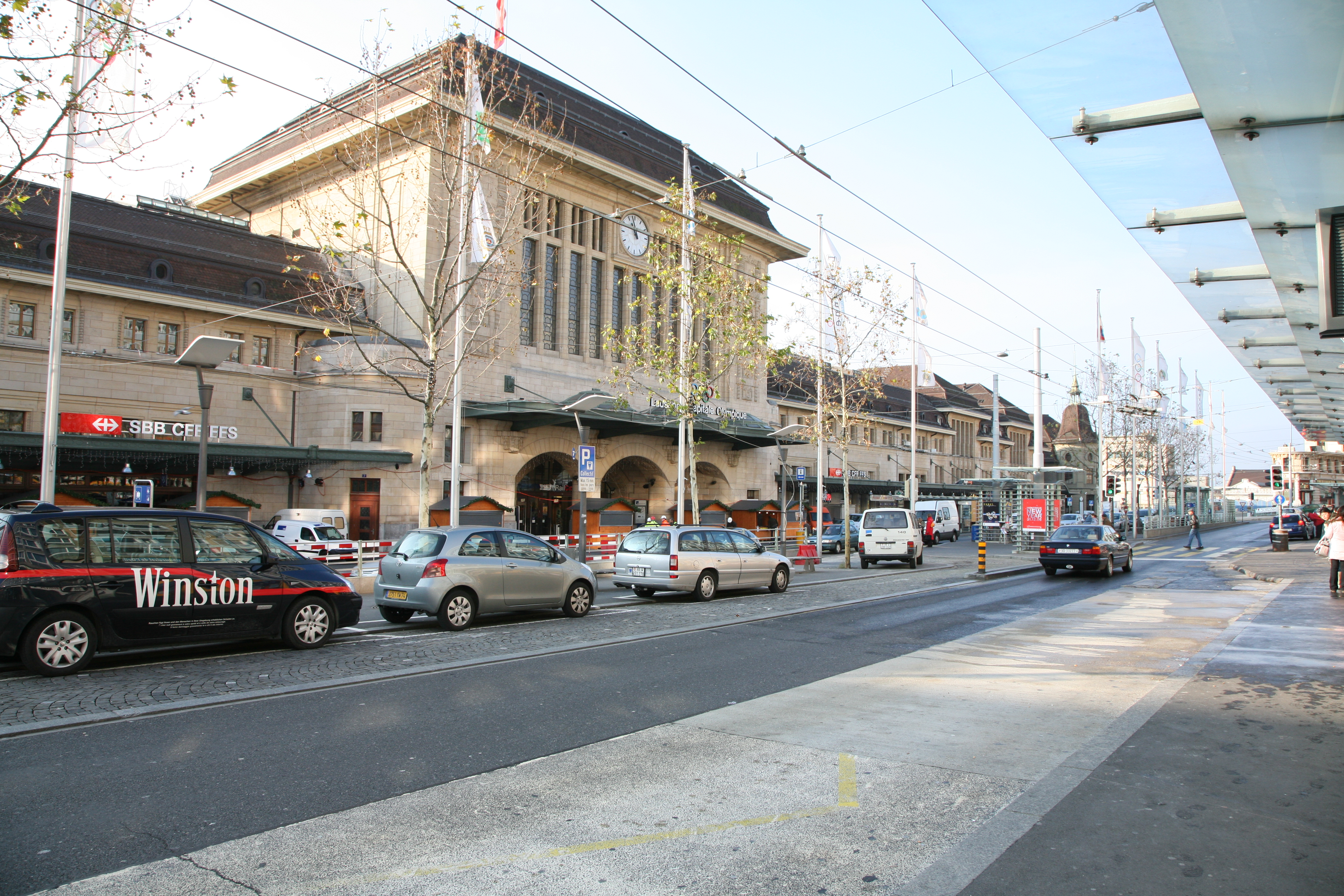
Lausanne station from Place de la Gare

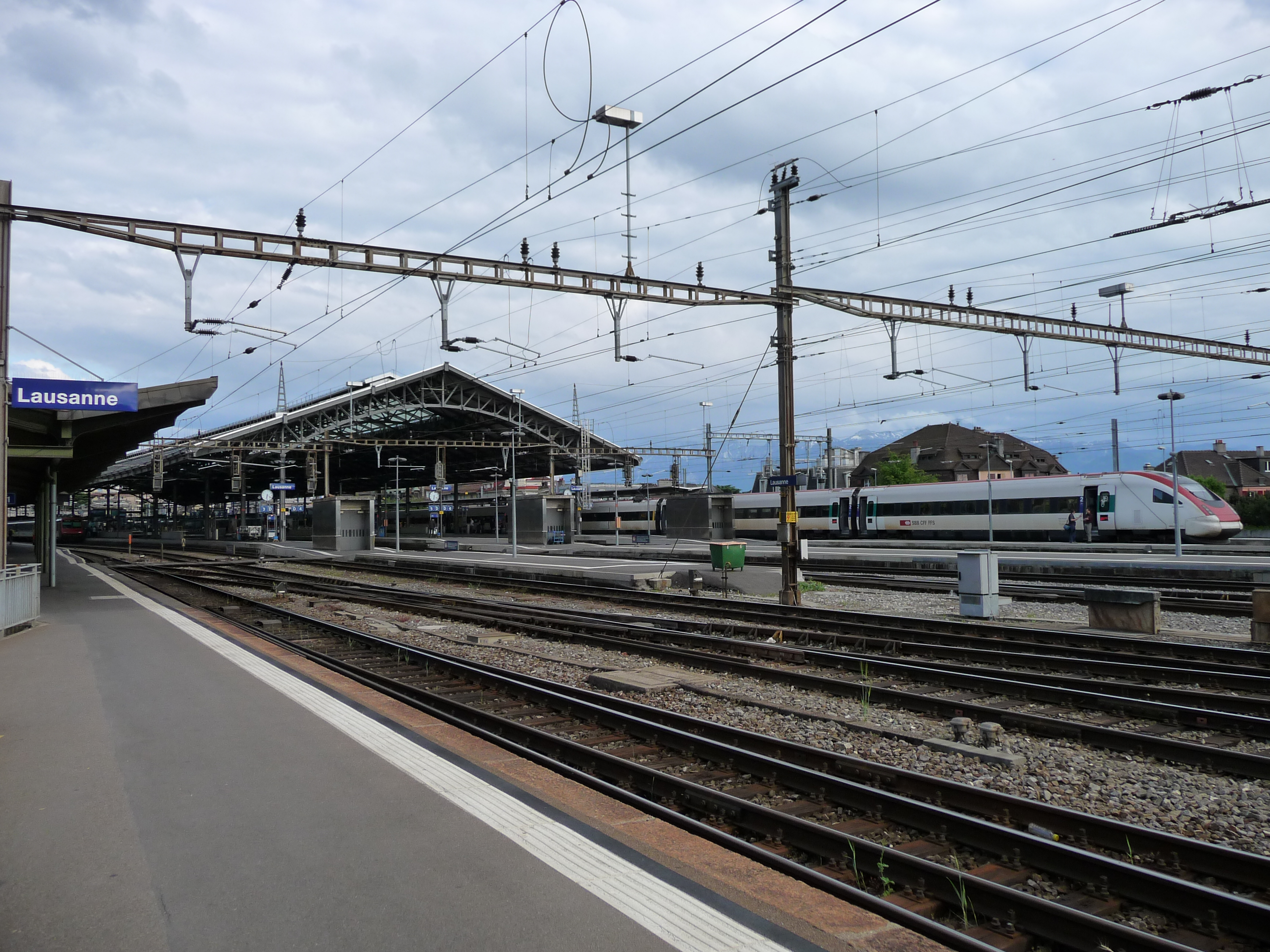
Lausanne station, looking East

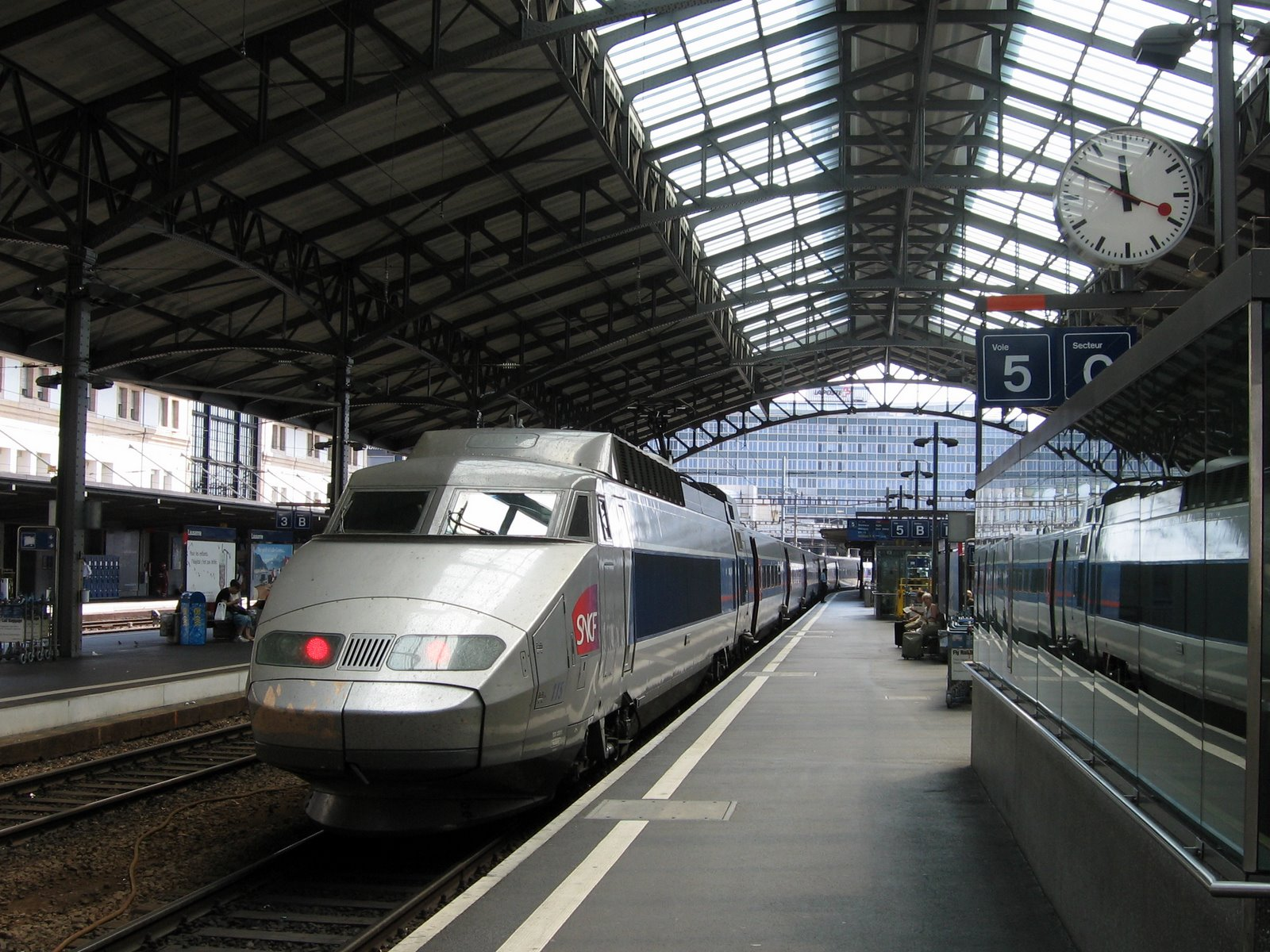
View under overall canopy (and a Swiss railway clock), looking East

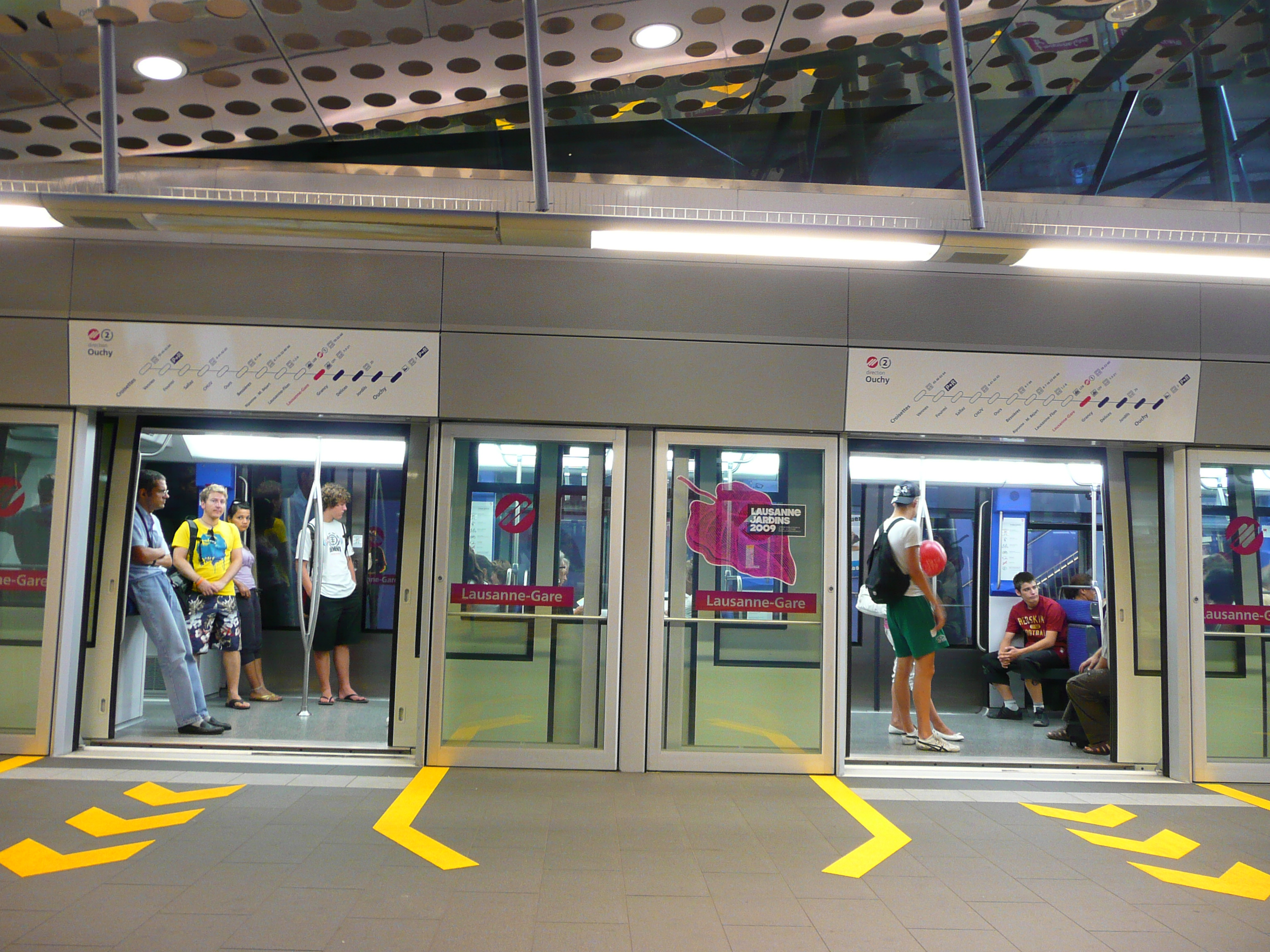
Lausanne Metro Line M2 platforms and coach

== See also ==
- History of rail transport in Switzerland
- Rail transport in Switzerland
