= Vallorbe railway station =

Railway station in Vallorbe, Switzerland

Vallorbe
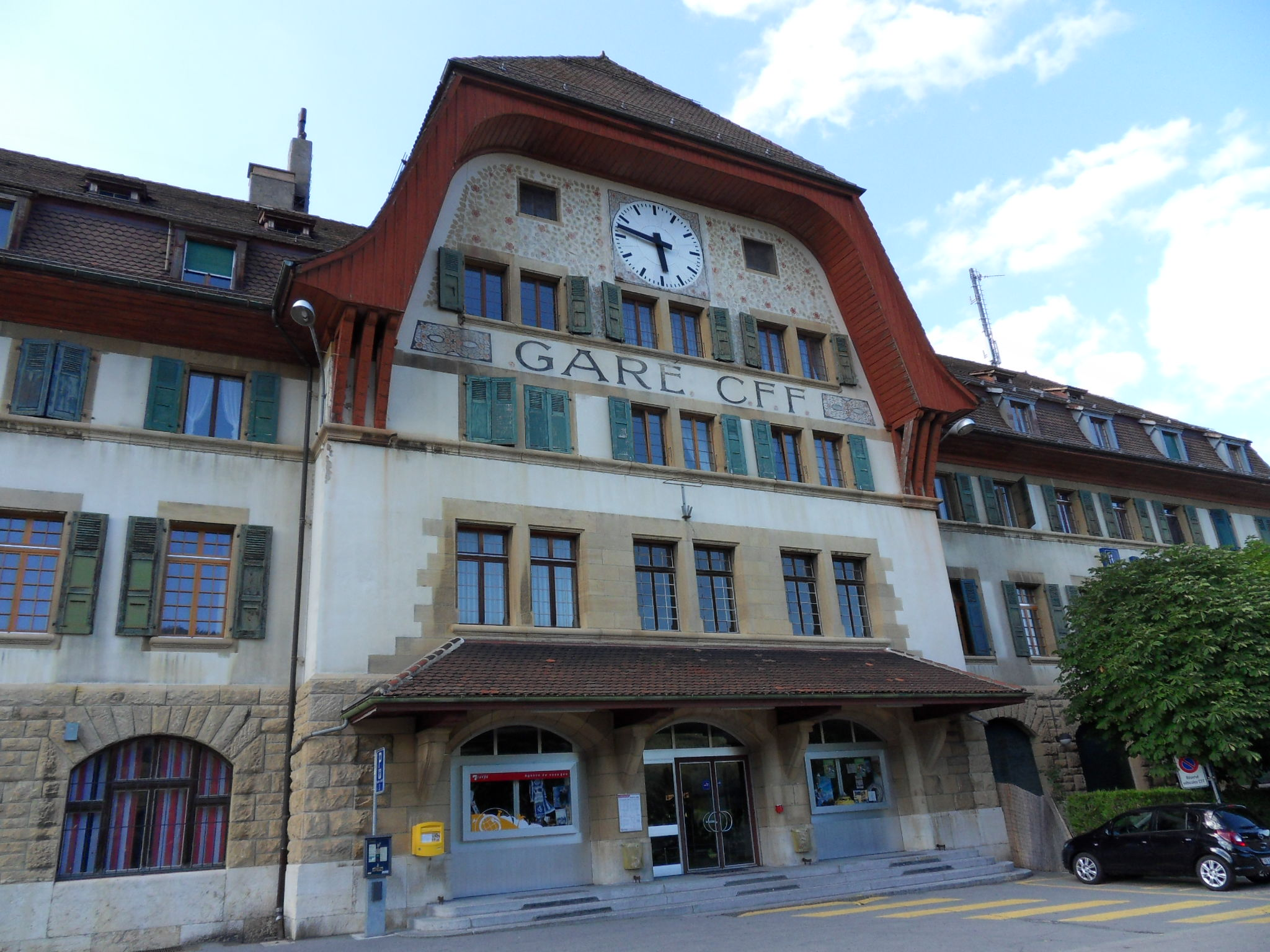
- The entrance to the station building.

General information
- Location: Rue de la Gare 1 Vallorbe; Switzerland
- Coordinates: 46°42′45″N 6°22′14″E
- Elevation: 806 m (2,644 ft)
- Owner: Swiss Federal Railways
- Lines: Dijon–Vallorbe line; Simplon line; Vallorbe–Le Brassus line
- Distance: 461.6 km (286.8 mi) from Paris-Lyon; 46.3 km (28.8 mi) from Lausanne
- Platforms: 4
- Tracks: 7
- Train operators: SNCF; Swiss Federal Railways; TGV Lyria; Travys
- Connections: Travys buses

Construction
- Parking: Yes (176 spaces)
- Cycle facilities: Yes (4 spaces)
- Accessible: No

Other information
- Station code: 8501103 (VAL)
- Fare zone: 110 (mobilis)

History
- Opened: 1915; 111 years ago
- Electrified: 1925; 101 years ago

Passengers
- 2023: 980 per weekday (SBB)

Services
Preceding station	RER Vaud	Following station
Terminus	R3	Le Day towards Vevey
Terminus	R4	Le Day towards Vevey
Preceding station	TGV Lyria	Following station
Frasne towards Paris-Lyon	Paris to Lausanne	Lausanne Terminus
Preceding station	TER Bourgogne-Franche-Comté	Following station
Labergement-Sainte-Marie towards Pontarlier	TER	Terminus
Frasne towards Pontarlier	TER	Terminus

Swiss Cultural Property of National Significance
Location

Vallorbe railway station (French: Gare de Vallorbe) is a station at the border of Switzerland and France on the TGV Lyria line between Paris and Lausanne. It is located at the south-eastern entrance of the tunnel which tunnels one of Jura's mountain ranges, Le Mont d’Or. The station serves the municipality of Vallorbe, in the Canton of Vaud, Switzerland.

Opened in 1915, the station is the south-eastern terminus of the historic French Dijon–Vallorbe line, and the north-western terminus of the historic Swiss Simplon line (Vallorbe–Domodossola). It is also the terminal station of the hourly running, suburban train S2 to Lausanne and further to Palézieux. Finally, it is also a junction for the short line to the south-western end of the Vallée de Joux, also running on an hourly frequency and connects to the historic Chemin de fer Pont-Brassus between Le Pont and Le Brassus, which nowadays is owned by travys (Transports Vallée de Joux - Yverdon-les-Bains - Ste-Croix). The line between Vallorbe and Le Brassus is operated by CFF. The railway station (as well as the line between Vallorbe and Le Pont) is owned and operated by CFF. They are all part of the integrated mobilis (canton of Vaud) fare network.

It is listed as a Swiss heritage site of national significance (class A).

== History ==
When the Simplon Tunnel project in southern Switzerland took shape, a controversy broke out regarding accessing rail lines from other parts of Switzerland. The proposed Faucille project via Geneva gave way to the Mont d'Or tunnel project via Vallorbe.

In 1870, the Swiss railway line from Daillens, the junction station on the Morges-Bussigny-Yverdon railway (opened in 1855), reached the frontier at Vallorbe. In France, the intended connecting line was completed as far as Pontarlier near Vallorbe in 1875. On 31 October 1886, the Jura–Simplon Railway (JS) opened the line between Vallorbe and Le Pont. Its continuation into the Vallée de Joux, the Chemin de fer Pont-Brassus, was built between 1886 (Le Pont) and 1899 (Le Brassus).

In 1915, nine years after the opening of the Simplon Tunnel, the direct Frasne–Lausanne line, including the Vallorbe railway station, was opened in conjunction with the piercing of the Mont d'Or. The doubling of the tracks were completed in 1908, and it was electrified in 1925. Since 1984, the station has also been served by TGV trains.

In its heyday, the station counted up to 250 employees, but that is no longer the case today. Plans affecting the station have been under discussion between the municipality, the canton of Vaud and CFF.

== Location ==
The station is situated on the northwestern edge of the town. Paradoxically, southbound trains from France approach the station from a southwesterly direction, and northbound trains from Lausanne approach from the northeast.

== Facilities ==
Vallorbe railway station has three platforms. As it is a French-Swiss border station with electrified lines, it forms a break of electrification systems. The overhead wires at the station can be switched from one system to the other. The station was equipped with extensive facilities for freight traffic and a locomotive depot.

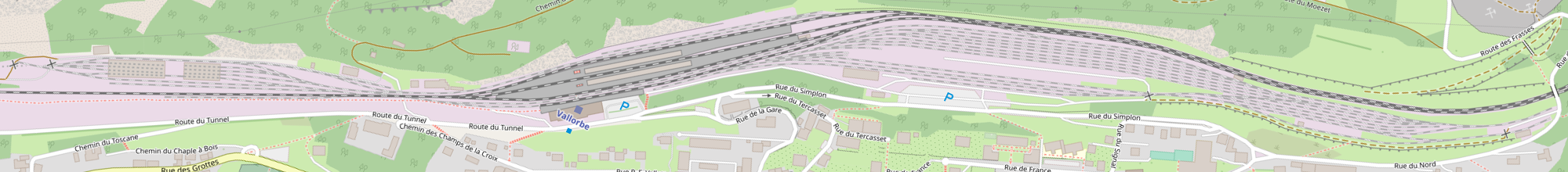
Map of the station

== Services ==
As of the December 2024 timetable change, the following services stop at Vallorbe:

- TGV Lyria: three trains per day between Paris-Lyon and Lausanne.
- TER Bourgogne-Franche-Comté: four rush-hour trains per day to Frasne.
- RER Vaud: R3 / R4: hourly (half-hourly on weekdays) service to Bex; limited service to St-Maurice.

== See also ==
- History of rail transport in Switzerland
- Rail transport in Switzerland
