= R3 (RER Vaud) =

Railway service in Switzerland

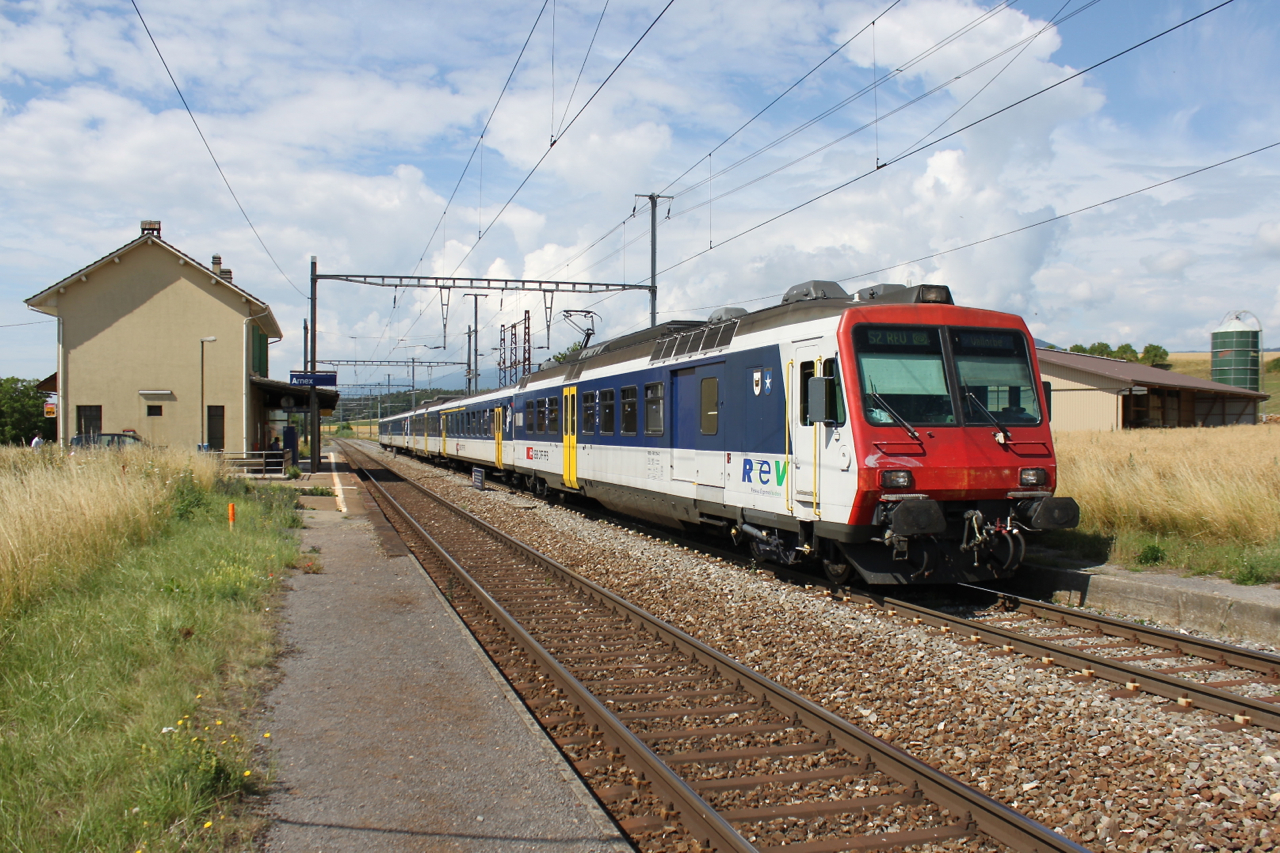
- An S2 at Arnex in 2009; the S2 became the S3 in December 2022

Overview
- Predecessor: S2; S5
- First service: 11 December 2022
- Current operator: Swiss Federal Railways

Route
- Termini: Vallorbe; Vevey
- Stops: 22
- Distance travelled: 97.9 kilometres (60.8 mi)
- Average journey time: 1 hour 6 minutes (Vallorbe–Vevey)
- Service frequency: Hourly
- Line used: Simplon line

The R3 is a railway service of RER Vaud that provides hourly service between Vallorbe and Vevey in the Swiss canton of Vaud. Swiss Federal Railways, the national railway company of Switzerland, operates the service. The service was previously known as the S3.

== Operations ==
The R3 operates every hour between Vallorbe and Vevey, using the western end of the Simplon line. The R3 makes a limited number of stops between Lausanne and Vevey. The R3 is paired with the R4 between Le Day and Vevey, providing half-hourly service.

== History ==
The "first" S3 was one of the six original lines of the RER Vaud, then called the Vaud Express Network (French: Réseau express vaudois, REV), when that system was established in December 2004. It ran hourly between Allaman and Villeneuve VD, on the Simplon line. With the December 2020 timetable change, the S3 was cut back to Lausanne, with the S5 taking over the Lausanne–Villeneuve service.

The RER Vaud lines were substantially reorganized for the December 2022 timetable change. The "new" S3 was a combination of the former S2 and S5, making local stops on the Simplon line between Vallorbe and Aigle, with limited service from Aigle to St-Maurice. On 10 December 2023, all RER Vaud lines were renamed as "R" and a number, instead of "S". In December 2024, the R3 was extended from Aigle to Bex, the service from Bex to St-Maurice was taken over by the RE33 service.
