= Bex railway station =

Railway station in Bex, Switzerland

Bex
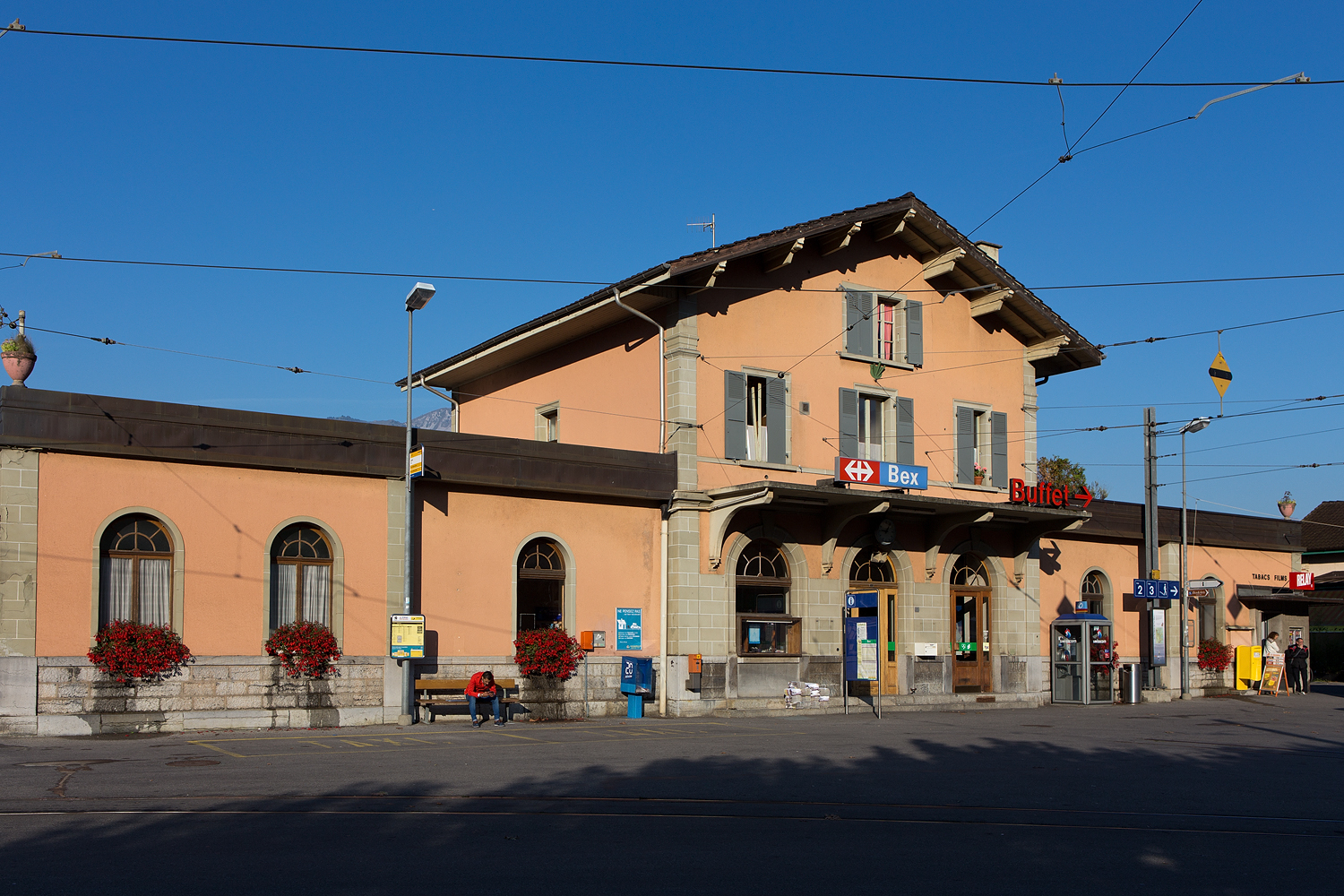
- The station building in 2014

General information
- Location: Bex; Switzerland
- Coordinates: 46°15′05″N 7°00′02″E
- Elevation: 410 m (1,350 ft)
- Owner: Swiss Federal Railways
- Lines: Bex–Villars–Bretaye railway line; Simplon line
- Distance: 47.6 km (29.6 mi) from Lausanne
- Platforms: 4
- Tracks: 6
- Train operators: Swiss Federal Railways; Transports Publics du Chablais
- Connections: CarPostal SA buses; Transports Publics du Chablais buses

Construction
- Parking: Yes (79 spaces)
- Cycle facilities: Yes (45 spaces)
- Accessible: SBB platforms only

Other information
- Station code: 8501402 (BEX)
- Fare zone: 84 (mobilis)

Passengers
- 2023: 2'800 per weekday (RegionAlps, SBB (excluding TPC))

Services
Preceding station	SBB CFF FFS	Following station
Aigle towards Annemasse or Geneva Airport	RE33	St-Maurice towards St-Maurice or Martigny
Aigle towards Lausanne	RegioExpress Limited service	St-Maurice Terminus
Aigle One-way operation	VosAlpes Express	Martigny towards Le Châble VS
Aigle towards Fribourg/Freiburg	VosAlpes Express	St-Maurice towards Le Châble VS
Preceding station	RER Vaud	Following station
Aigle towards Vallorbe	R3	Terminus
Aigle towards Le Brassus or Vallorbe	R4	Terminus
Aigle towards Vallorbe	R3 Limited service	St-Maurice Terminus
Aigle towards Le Brassus or Vallorbe	R4 Limited service	St-Maurice Terminus
Preceding station	Transports Publics du Chablais	Following station
Terminus	R74	La Ruaz towards Col-de-Bretaye
Location

Bex railway station (French: Gare de Bex) is a railway station in the municipality of Bex, in the Swiss canton of Vaud. It is an intermediate stop on the Simplon line and the terminus of the Bex–Villars–Bretaye line.

== Services ==
As of the December 2024 timetable change, the following services stop at Bex:

- RegioExpress:
  - half-hourly service (hourly on weekends) between Annemasse and St-Maurice, and hourly service from St-Maurice to Martigny. On weekends, hourly service to Geneva Airport.
  - two round-trips in each direction between Lausanne and St-Maurice.
- VosAlpes Express: daily direct service between Le Châble VS and Fribourg/Freiburg on weekends between December and April.
- Regio: hourly service to Villars-sur-Ollon.
- RER Vaud R3 / R4: half-hourly (hourly on weekends) service to Vallorbe; hourly service to Le Brassus; limited service to St-Maurice.
