= Grandson railway station =

Railway station in Grandson, Switzerland

Grandson
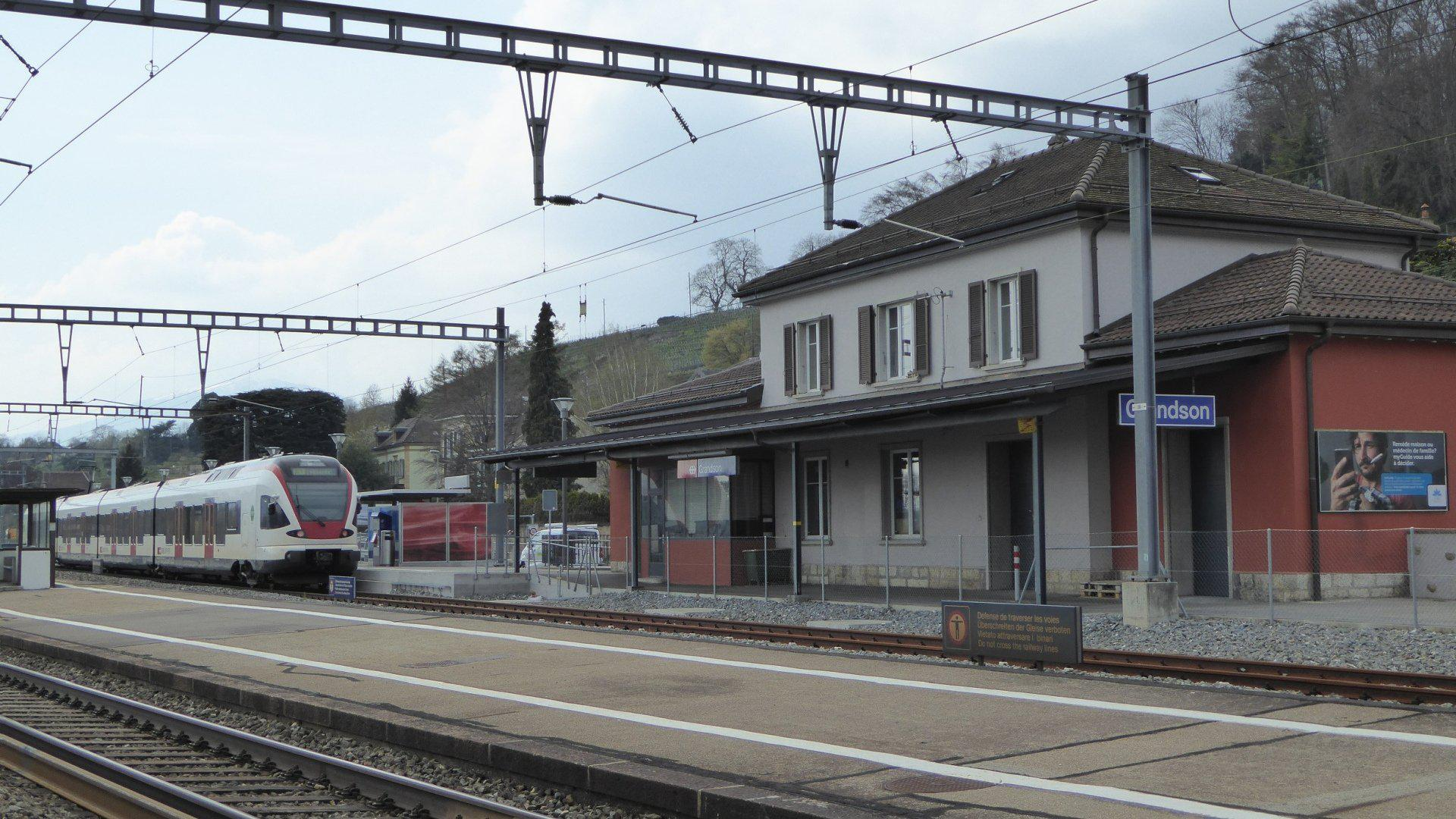
- The station in 2018

General information
- Location: Grandson; Switzerland
- Coordinates: 46°48′23″N 6°38′31″E
- Elevation: 435 m (1,427 ft)
- Owner: Swiss Federal Railways
- Line: Jura Foot line
- Distance: 42.7 km (26.5 mi) from Lausanne
- Platforms: 3; 1 side platform; 1 island platform
- Train operators: Swiss Federal Railways
- Connections: CarPostal SA buses

Construction
- Parking: Yes (64 spaces)
- Cycle facilities: Yes (42 spaces)
- Accessible: Yes

Other information
- Station code: 8504201 (GRS)
- Fare zone: 123 (mobilis)

Passengers
- 2023: 1'000 per weekday (SBB)

Services
Preceding station	RER Vaud	Following station
Yverdon-les-Bains towards Cully	R1	Terminus
Yverdon-les-Bains towards Cully	R2	Terminus
Location

Grandson railway station (French: Gare de Grandson) is a railway station in the municipality of Grandson, in the Swiss canton of Vaud. It is an intermediate stop on the standard gauge Jura Foot line of Swiss Federal Railways.

== History ==
Grandson railway station was inaugurated in 1859 with the opening of the Yverdon-les-Bains - Vaumarcus section of the Jura Foot line.

The electrification of the line, from Yverdon-les-Bains to Biel/Bienne, was commissioned on 23 December 1927.

Since the timetable change on 13 December 2015, the station has become the terminus of the RER Vaud, replacing Yverdon-les-Bains railway station. This extension required the construction of a platform along a former freight train overpass track, reused for stopping RER Vaud trains and reversing them at the platform. These are 55 centimetres high and 225 metres long.

== Services ==
As of the December 2024 timetable change, the following services stop at Grandson:

- RER Vaud R1 / R2: half-hourly service to Cully.
