= RER Vaud =

Public transport network in Switzerland

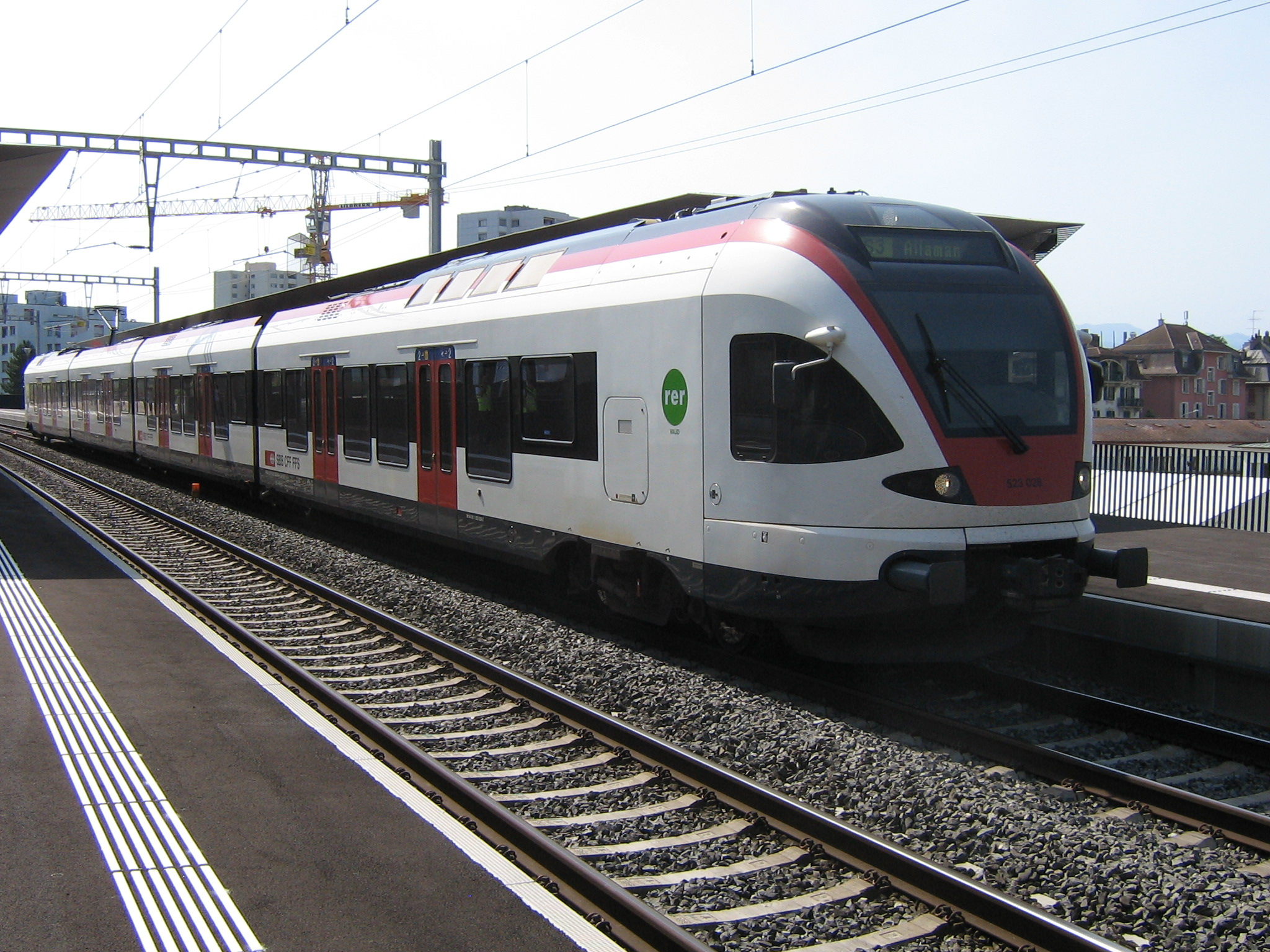
- RER Vaud S3 train at Prilly-Malley in 2012

- The RER Vaud Network plan in December 2023

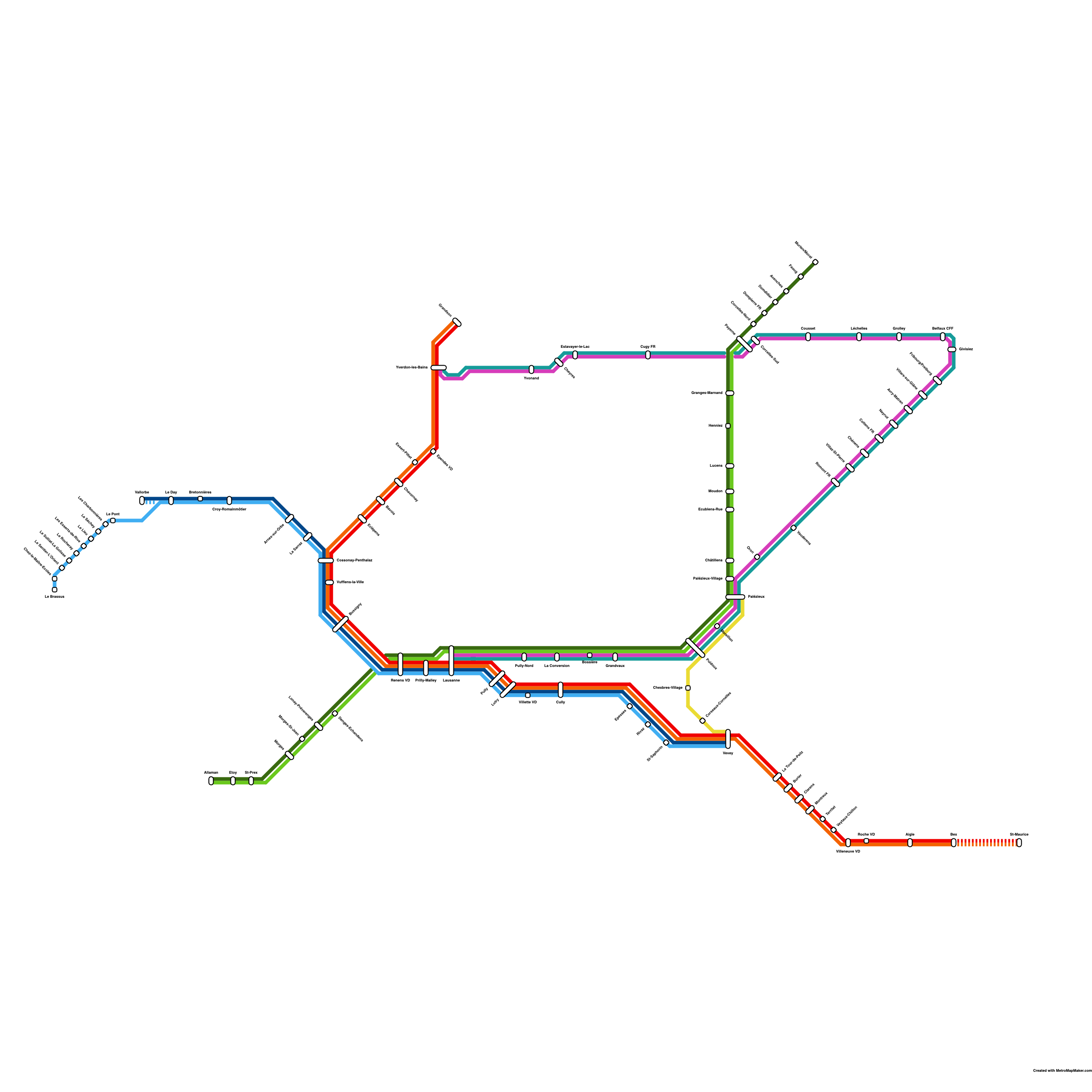
- The RER Vaud Network plan in February 2026

Overview
- Native name: French: Réseau express régional vaudois
- Locale: Vaud
- Transit type: S-Bahn
- Number of lines: 7

Operation
- Began operation: December 2004; 21 years ago
- Operator: Swiss Federal Railways (SBB)

Technical
- Track gauge: 1,435 mm (4 ft 8 1/2 in) standard gauge

RER Vaud (French: Réseau express régional vaudois) is an S-Bahn network in the canton of Vaud in Switzerland. It is centered on Lausanne and began operating in December 2004.

== Lines ==
As of January 2026 the network consists of the following lines:

- R1: Grandson – Lausanne – Bex (– St-Maurice)
- R2: Grandson – Lausanne – Bex (– St-Maurice)
- R3: Vallorbe – Le Day – Lausanne – Vevey
- R4: (Vallorbe)/Le Brassus – Le Day – Lausanne – Vevey
- R7: Vevey – Palézieux, called the Vine Train (French: Train des vignes)
- R8: Allaman – Lausanne – Payerne
- R9: Allaman – Lausanne – Murten/Morat

All lines except the R7 serve Lausanne, which serves as the main hub of the network.

== History ==
With the December 2022 timetable change the RER Vaud network was substantially reorganized:

Line	December 2021	December 2022	Notes
S1	Grandson – Lausanne	Grandson – Lausanne (– Cully)	
S2	Vallorbe – Aigle (– St-Maurice)	Grandson – Lausanne (– Cully)	Replaces S5
S3	Allaman – Lausanne	Vallorbe – Aigle (– St-Maurice)	Replaces S5
S4	Allaman – Palézieux (– Romont)	Le Brassus – Aigle (– St-Maurice)	Replaces S2 and S22
S5	Grandson – Aigle (– St-Maurice)	Allaman – Palézieux	Replaces S3 and S6
S6	Lausanne – Palézieux	Allaman – Palézieux (– Romont)	Replaces S4
S7	Vevey – Puidoux	No change	
S8	Palézieux – Payerne (– Avenches)	No change	
S9	Lausanne – Kerzers	No change	
S22	Le Brassus – Lausanne	Discontinued	Replaced by S4

On 10 December 2023, all RER Vaud lines were renamed as "R" and a number, instead of "S."
