= Ecublens-Rue railway station =

Railway station in Écublens, Fribourg, Switzerland

Ecublens-Rue
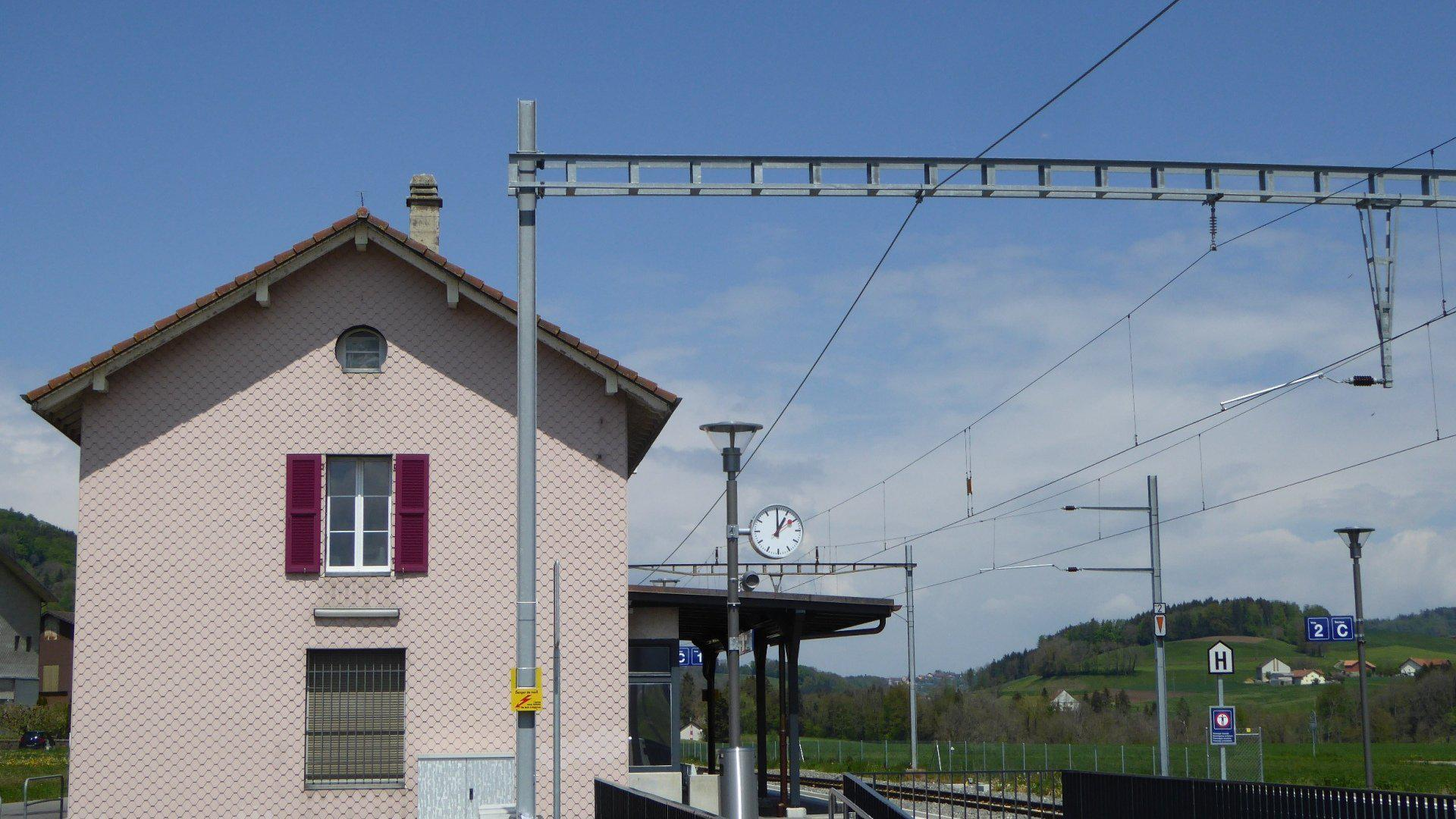
- The station building in 2018

General information
- Location: Écublens; Switzerland
- Coordinates: 46°36′37″N 6°48′40″E
- Elevation: 585 m (1,919 ft)
- Owner: Swiss Federal Railways
- Line: Palézieux–Lyss line
- Distance: 30.6 km (19.0 mi) from Lausanne
- Platforms: 2 side platforms
- Tracks: 2
- Train operators: Swiss Federal Railways

Construction
- Parking: Yes (5 spaces)
- Cycle facilities: Yes (20 spaces)
- Accessible: Yes

Other information
- Station code: 8504018 (ECU)
- Fare zone: 61 (mobilis); 46 (frimobil)

Passengers
- 2023: 100 per weekday (SBB)

Services
Preceding station	RER Vaud	Following station
Châtillens towards Allaman	R8	Moudon towards Payerne
Châtillens towards Allaman	R9	Moudon towards Murten/Morat
Location

Ecublens-Rue railway station (French: Gare de Ecublens-Rue) is a railway station in the municipality of Écublens, in the Swiss canton of Fribourg. It is an intermediate stop on the standard gauge Palézieux–Lyss line of Swiss Federal Railways.

== Services ==
As of the December 2024 timetable change, the following services stop at Ecublens-Rue:

- RER Vaud R8 / R9: half-hourly service between Allaman and Payerne, with every other train continuing from Payerne to Murten/Morat.
