= Moudon railway station =

Railway station in Moudon, Switzerland

Moudon
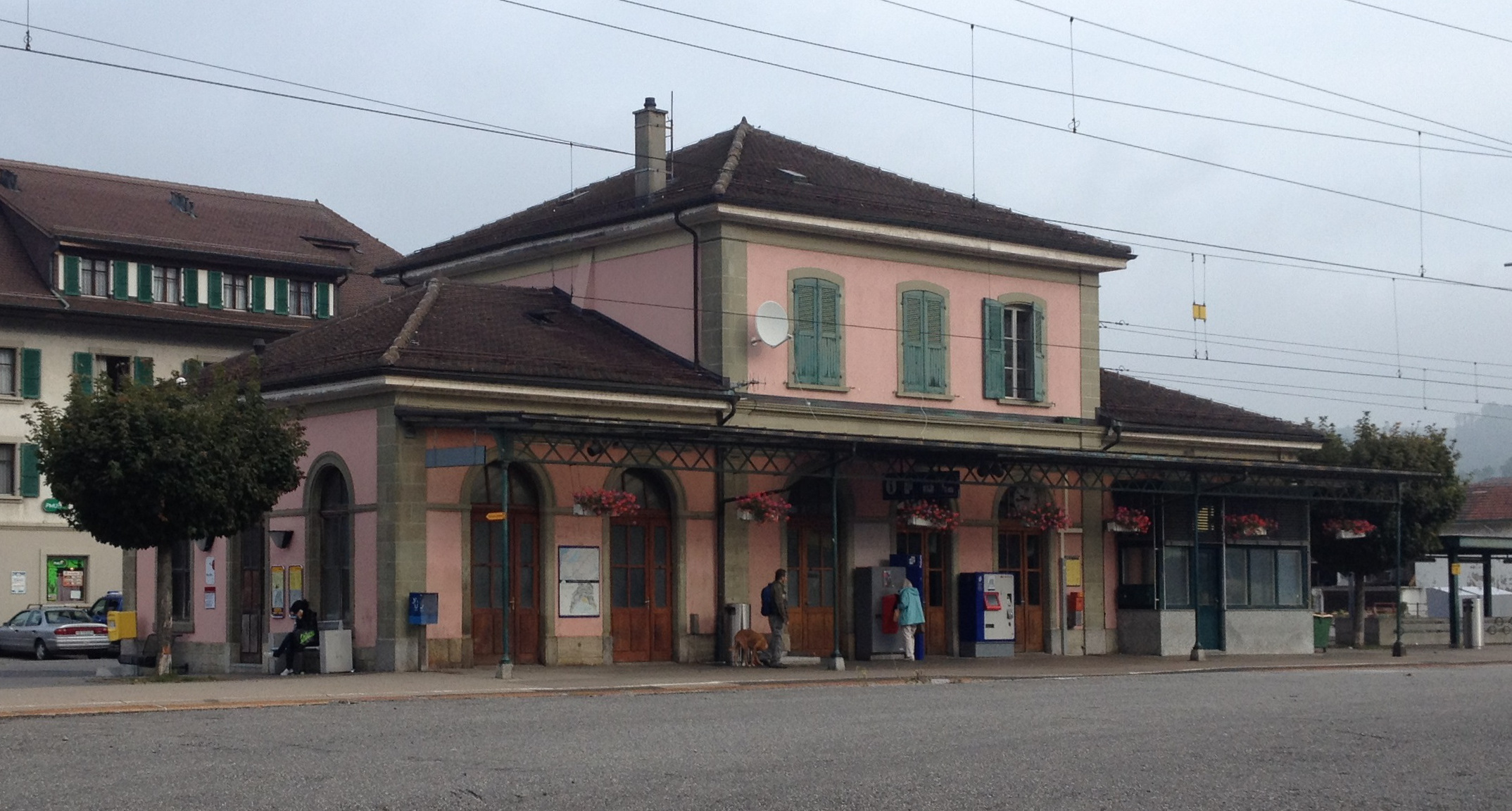
- The station building in 2013

General information
- Location: Moudon; Switzerland
- Coordinates: 46°40′05″N 6°48′09″E
- Elevation: 510 m (1,670 ft)
- Owner: Swiss Federal Railways
- Line: Palézieux–Lyss line
- Distance: 38.0 km (23.6 mi) from Lausanne
- Platforms: 2
- Tracks: 3
- Train operators: Swiss Federal Railways
- Connections: CarPostal SA buses; tpf bus line

Construction
- Parking: Yes (30 spaces)
- Cycle facilities: Yes (40 spaces)
- Accessible: No

Other information
- Station code: 8504120 (MD)
- Fare zone: 60 (mobilis); 47 (frimobil)

Passengers
- 2023: 1'700 per weekday (SBB)

Services
| Preceding station | RER Vaud | Following station |
|---|---|---|
| Ecublens-Rue towards Allaman | R8 | Lucens towards Payerne |
| Ecublens-Rue towards Allaman | R9 | Lucens towards Murten/Morat |
Location

Moudon railway station (French: Gare de Moudon) is a railway station in the municipality of Moudon, in the Swiss canton of Vaud. It is an intermediate stop on the standard gauge Palézieux–Lyss line of Swiss Federal Railways.

== Services ==
As of the December 2024 timetable change, the following services stop at Moudon:

- RER Vaud R8 / R9: half-hourly service between Allaman and Payerne, with every other train continuing from Payerne to Murten/Morat.
