= Lucens railway station =

Railway station in Lucens, Switzerland

Lucens
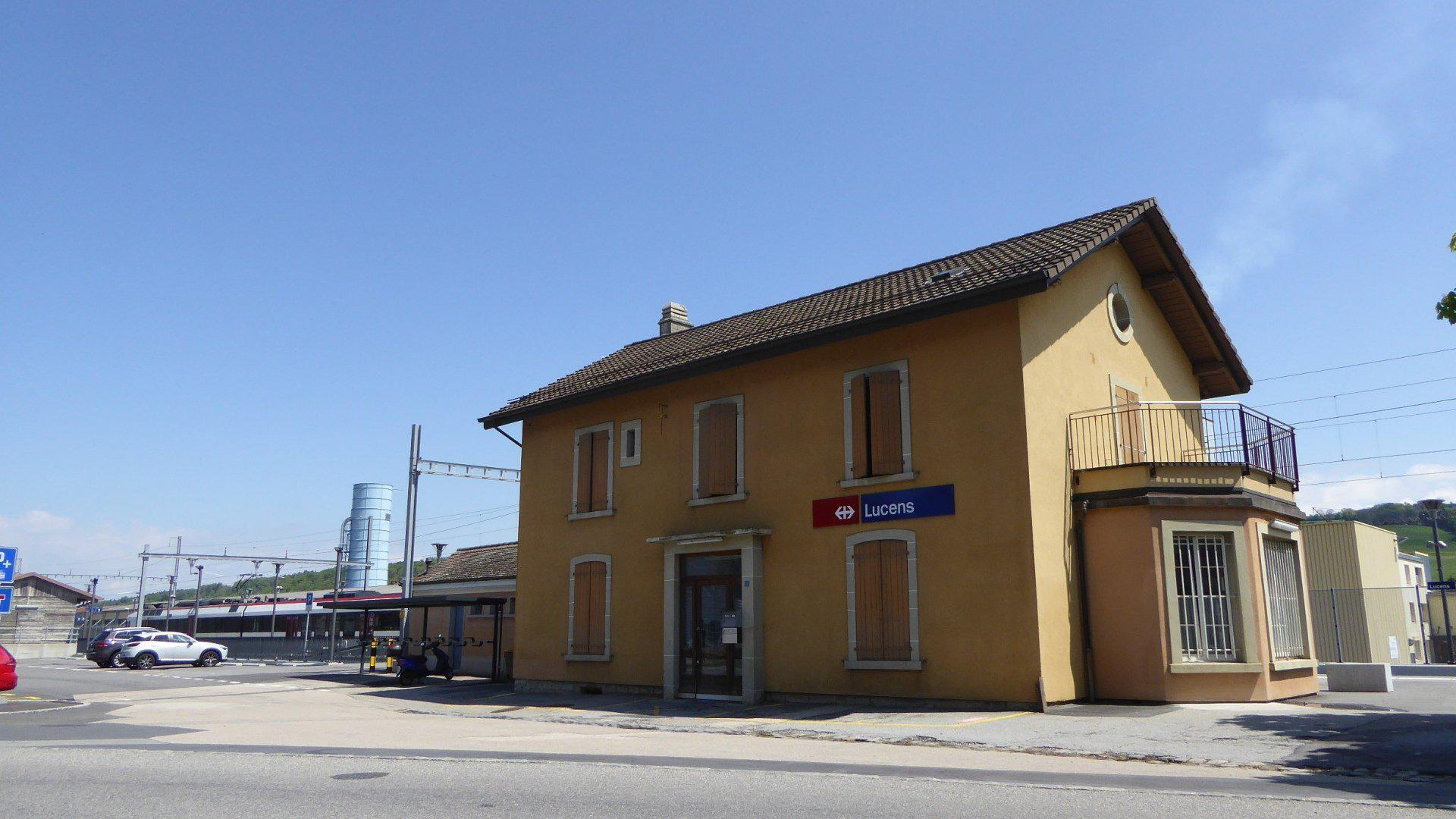
- The station building in 2018

General information
- Location: Lucens; Switzerland
- Coordinates: 46°42′28″N 6°50′32″E
- Elevation: 439 m (1,440 ft)
- Owner: Swiss Federal Railways
- Line: Palézieux–Lyss line
- Distance: 43.4 km (27.0 mi) from Lausanne
- Platforms: 2 side platforms
- Tracks: 2
- Train operators: Swiss Federal Railways
- Connections: CarPostal SA buses

Construction
- Parking: Yes (27 spaces)
- Cycle facilities: Yes (18 spaces)
- Accessible: Yes

Other information
- Station code: 8504121 (LUC)
- Fare zone: 103 (mobilis); 45 (frimobil)

Passengers
- 2023: 1'400 per weekday (SBB)

Services
| Preceding station | RER Vaud | Following station |
|---|---|---|
| Moudon towards Allaman | R8 | Granges-Marnand towards Payerne |
| Moudon towards Allaman | R9 | Henniez towards Murten/Morat |
Location

Lucens railway station (French: Gare de Lucens) is a railway station in the municipality of Lucens, in the Swiss canton of Vaud. It is an intermediate stop on the standard gauge Palézieux–Lyss line of Swiss Federal Railways.

== Services ==
As of the December 2024 timetable change, the following services stop at Lucens:

- RER Vaud R8 / R9: half-hourly service between Allaman and Payerne, with every other train continuing from Payerne to Murten/Morat.
