= Châtillens railway station =

Railway station in Oron, Switzerland

Châtillens
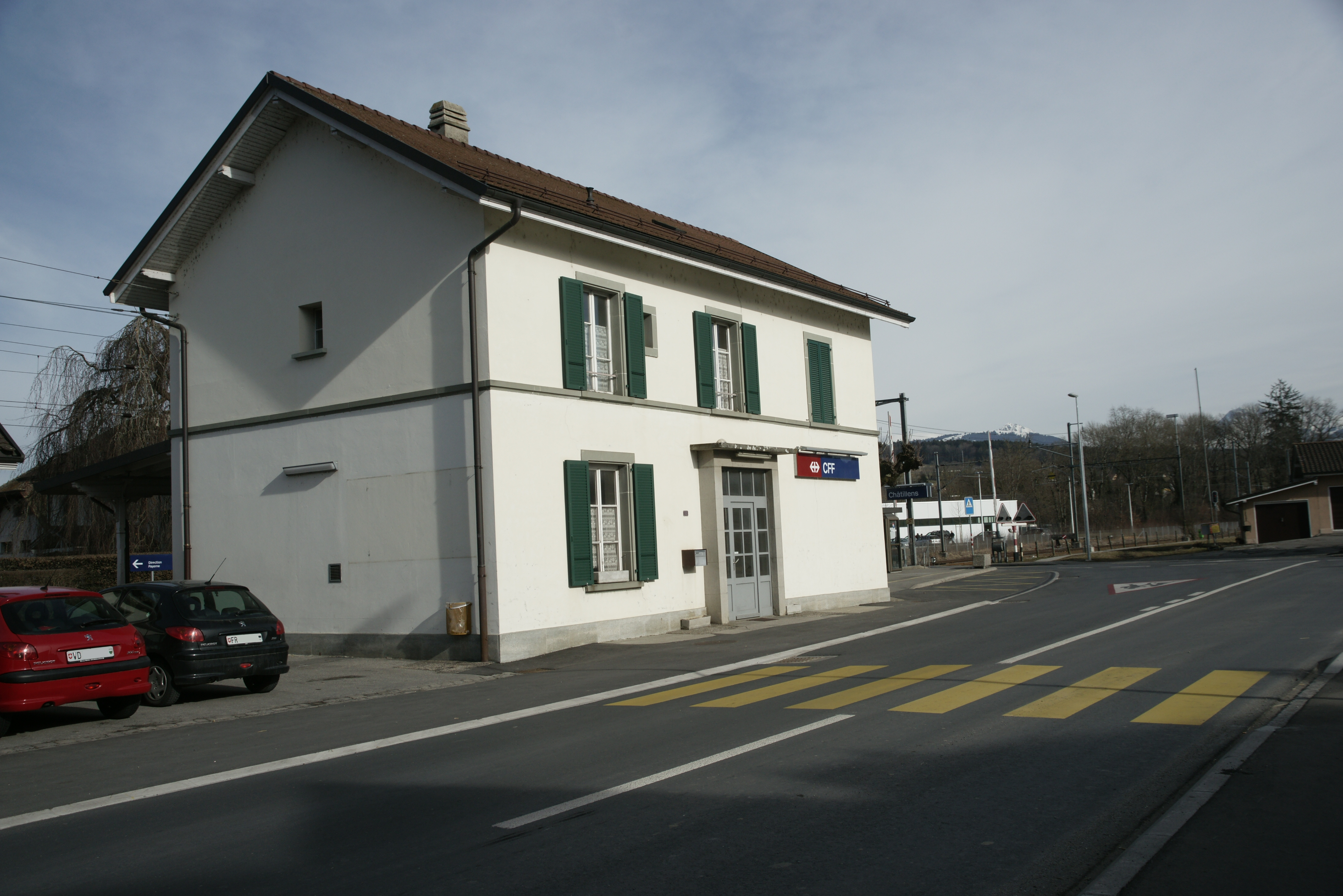
- The station building in 2012

General information
- Location: Oron; Switzerland
- Coordinates: 46°34′14″N 6°48′56″E
- Elevation: 601 m (1,972 ft)
- Owner: Swiss Federal Railways
- Line: Palézieux–Lyss line
- Distance: 25.9 km (16.1 mi) from Lausanne
- Platforms: 1 side platform
- Tracks: 2
- Train operators: Swiss Federal Railways
- Connections: CarPostal SA bus line

Construction
- Parking: Yes (5 spaces)
- Cycle facilities: Yes (12 spaces)
- Accessible: Yes

Other information
- Station code: 8504017 (CHAT)
- Fare zone: 62 (mobilis); 92 (frimobil)

Passengers
- 2023: 330 per weekday (SBB)

Services
Preceding station	RER Vaud	Following station
Palézieux-Village towards Allaman	R8	Ecublens-Rue towards Payerne
Palézieux-Village towards Allaman	R9	Ecublens-Rue towards Murten/Morat
Location

Châtillens railway station (French: Gare de Châtillens) is a railway station in the municipality of Oron, in the Swiss canton of Vaud. It is an intermediate stop on the standard gauge Palézieux–Lyss line of Swiss Federal Railways.

== Services ==
As of the December 2024 timetable change, the following services stop at Châtillens:

- RER Vaud R8 / R9: half-hourly service between Allaman and Payerne, with every other train continuing from Payerne to Murten/Morat.
