= Palézieux-Village railway station =

Railway station in Oron, Switzerland

Palézieux-Village
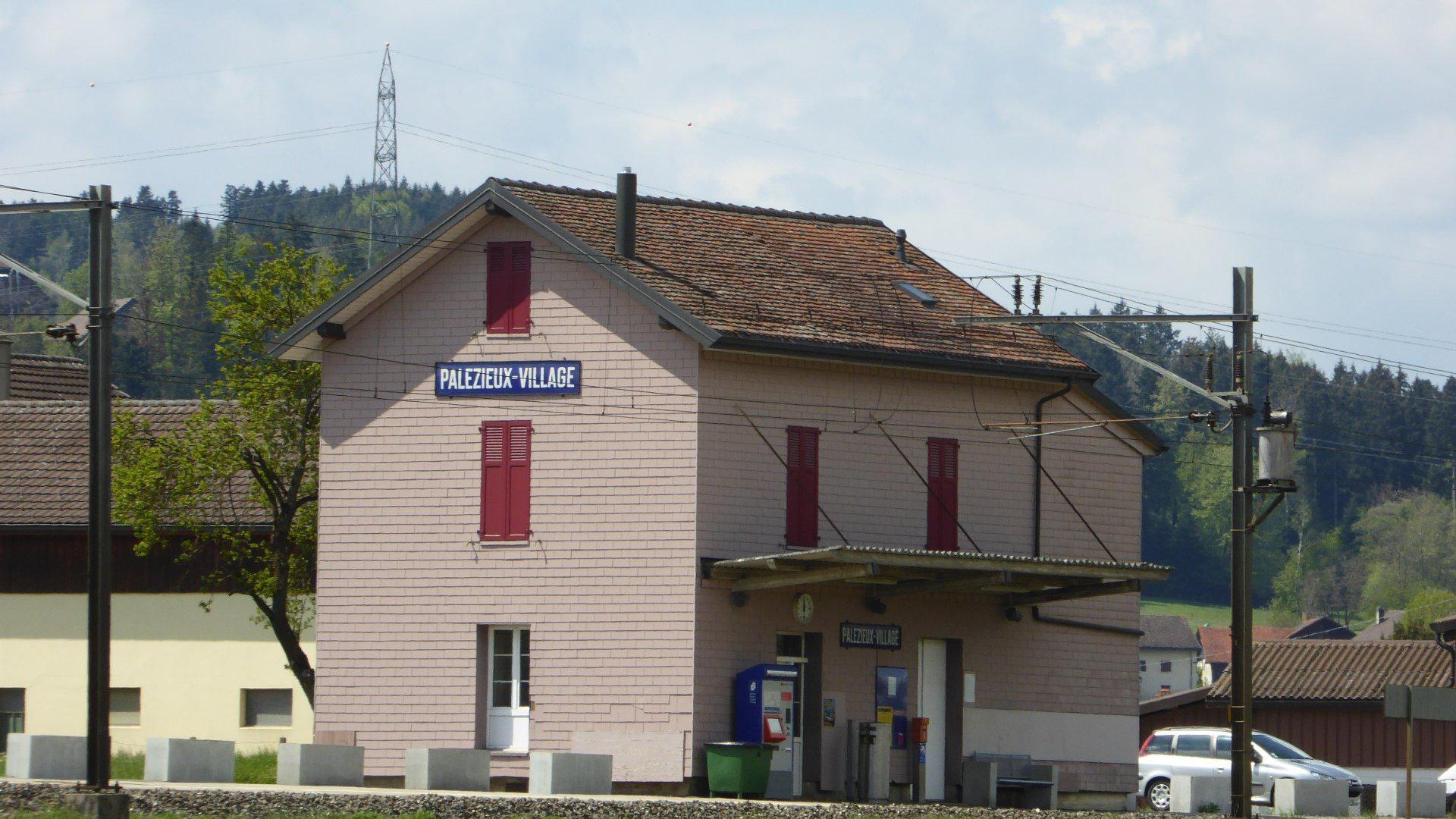
- The station building in 2018

General information
- Location: Oron; Switzerland
- Coordinates: 46°33′26″N 6°49′44″E
- Elevation: 633 m (2,077 ft)
- Owner: Swiss Federal Railways
- Line: Palézieux–Lyss line
- Distance: 23.4 km (14.5 mi) from Lausanne
- Platforms: 1 side platform
- Tracks: 1
- Train operators: Swiss Federal Railways
- Connections: CarPostal SA buses; tpf buses

Construction
- Accessible: Yes

Other information
- Station code: 8504016 (PALV)
- Fare zone: 62 and 63 (mobilis); 92 and 93 (frimobil)

History
- Opened: 1876

Passengers
- 2023: 210 per weekday (SBB)

Services
Preceding station	RER Vaud	Following station
Palézieux towards Allaman	R8	Châtillens towards Payerne
Palézieux towards Allaman	R9	Châtillens towards Murten/Morat
Route map
Location

Palézieux-Village railway station serves the village of Palézieux, in the canton of Vaud, Switzerland. It is an intermediate stop on the standard gauge Palézieux–Lyss line of Swiss Federal Railways.

== Services ==
As of the December 2024 timetable change, the following services stop at Palézieux-Village:

- RER Vaud R8 / R9: half-hourly service between Allaman and Payerne, with every other train continuing from Payerne to Murten/Morat.
