= Granges-Marnand railway station =

Railway station in Valbroye, Switzerland

Granges-Marnand
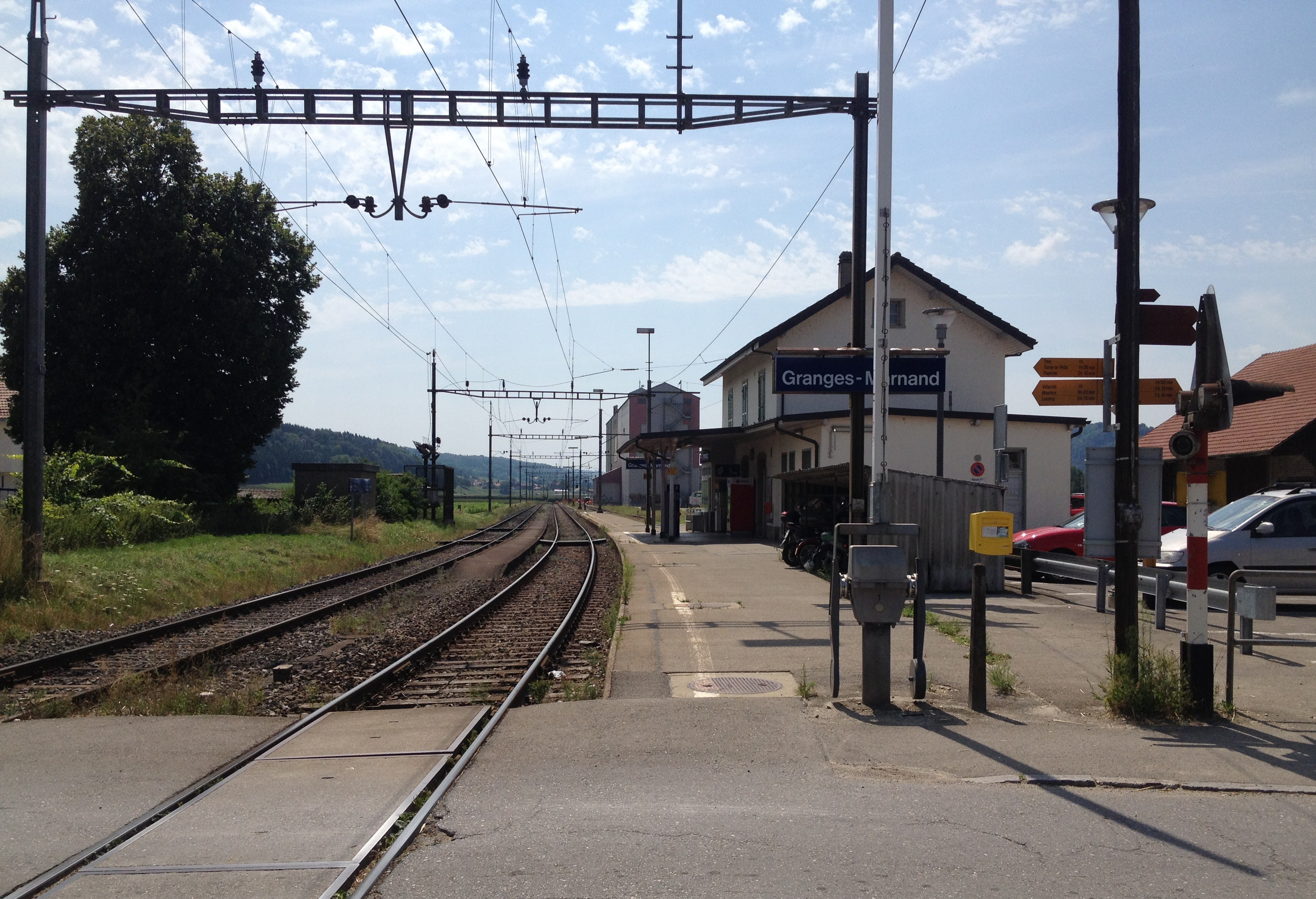
- The station building in 2013

General information
- Location: Valbroye; Switzerland
- Coordinates: 46°45′32″N 6°53′39″E
- Elevation: 469 m (1,539 ft)
- Owner: Swiss Federal Railways
- Line: Palézieux–Lyss line
- Distance: 50.4 km (31.3 mi) from Lausanne
- Platforms: 1 side platform
- Tracks: 2
- Train operators: Swiss Federal Railways
- Connections: CarPostal Suisse buses

Construction
- Parking: Yes (17 spaces)
- Cycle facilities: Yes (22 spaces)
- Accessible: Yes

Other information
- Station code: 8504122 (GM)
- Fare zone: 101 (mobilis)

Passengers
- 2023: 600 per weekday (SBB)

Services
Preceding station	RER Vaud	Following station
Lucens towards Allaman	R8	Payerne Terminus
Henniez towards Allaman	R9	Payerne towards Murten/Morat
Location

Granges-Marnand railway station (French: Gare de Granges-Marnand) is a railway station in the municipality of Valbroye, in the Swiss canton of Vaud. It is an intermediate stop on the standard gauge Palézieux–Lyss line of Swiss Federal Railways.

== Services ==
As of the December 2024 timetable change, the following services stop at Granges-Marnand:

- RER Vaud R8 / R9: half-hourly service between Allaman and Payerne, with every other train continuing from Payerne to Murten/Morat.
