= Dompierre FR railway station =

Railway station in Belmont-Broye, Switzerland

Dompierre FR
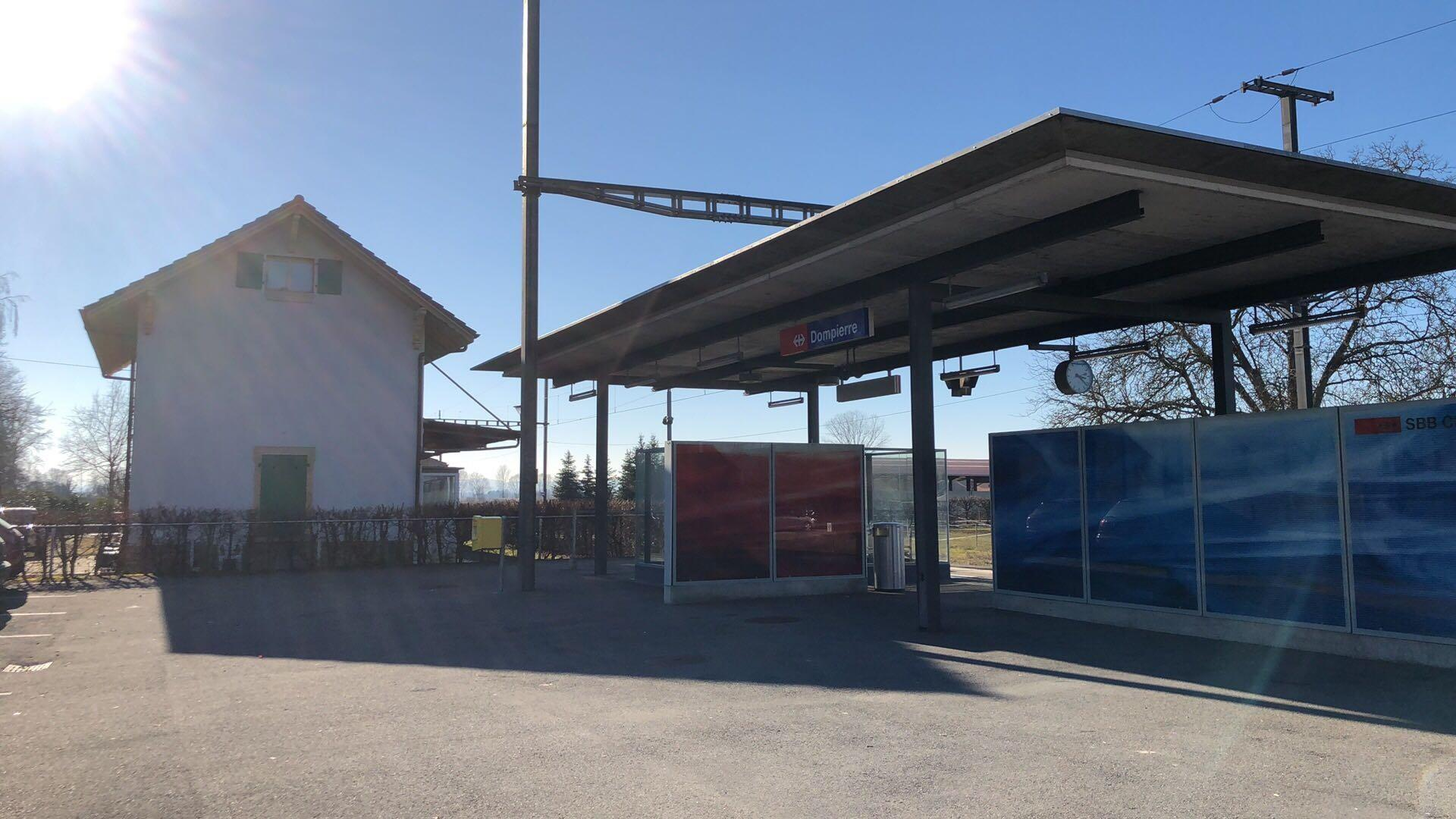
- The station platform in 2019

General information
- Location: Belmont-Broye; Switzerland
- Coordinates: 46°51′16″N 6°59′07″E
- Elevation: 442 m (1,450 ft)
- Owner: Swiss Federal Railways
- Line: Palézieux–Lyss railway line
- Distance: 63.7 km (39.6 mi) from Lausanne
- Platforms: 1 side platform
- Tracks: 1
- Train operators: Swiss Federal Railways; BLS AG

Construction
- Parking: Yes (6 spaces)
- Cycle facilities: Yes (10 spaces)
- Accessible: Yes

Other information
- Station code: 8504124 (DOP)
- Fare zone: 57 (frimobil); 131 (Mobilis Vaud)

Passengers
- 2023: 170 per weekday (BLS, SBB)

Services
Preceding station	RER Vaud	Following station
Corcelles-Nord towards Allaman	R9	Domdidier towards Murten/Morat
Preceding station	Bern S-Bahn	Following station
Corcelles-Nord towards Payerne	S52 Limited service	Domdidier towards Bern
Location

Dompierre FR railway station (French: Gare de Dompierre FR) is a railway station in the village of Dompierre, within the municipality of Belmont-Broye, in the Swiss canton of Fribourg. It is an intermediate stop on the standard gauge Palézieux–Lyss line of Swiss Federal Railways.

== Services ==
As of the December 2024 timetable change, the following services stop at Dompierre FR:

- RER Vaud R9: hourly service between Allaman and Murten/Morat.
- Bern S-Bahn S52: limited service between Bern and Payerne.
