= St-Prex railway station =

Railway station in Saint-Prex, Switzerland

St-Prex
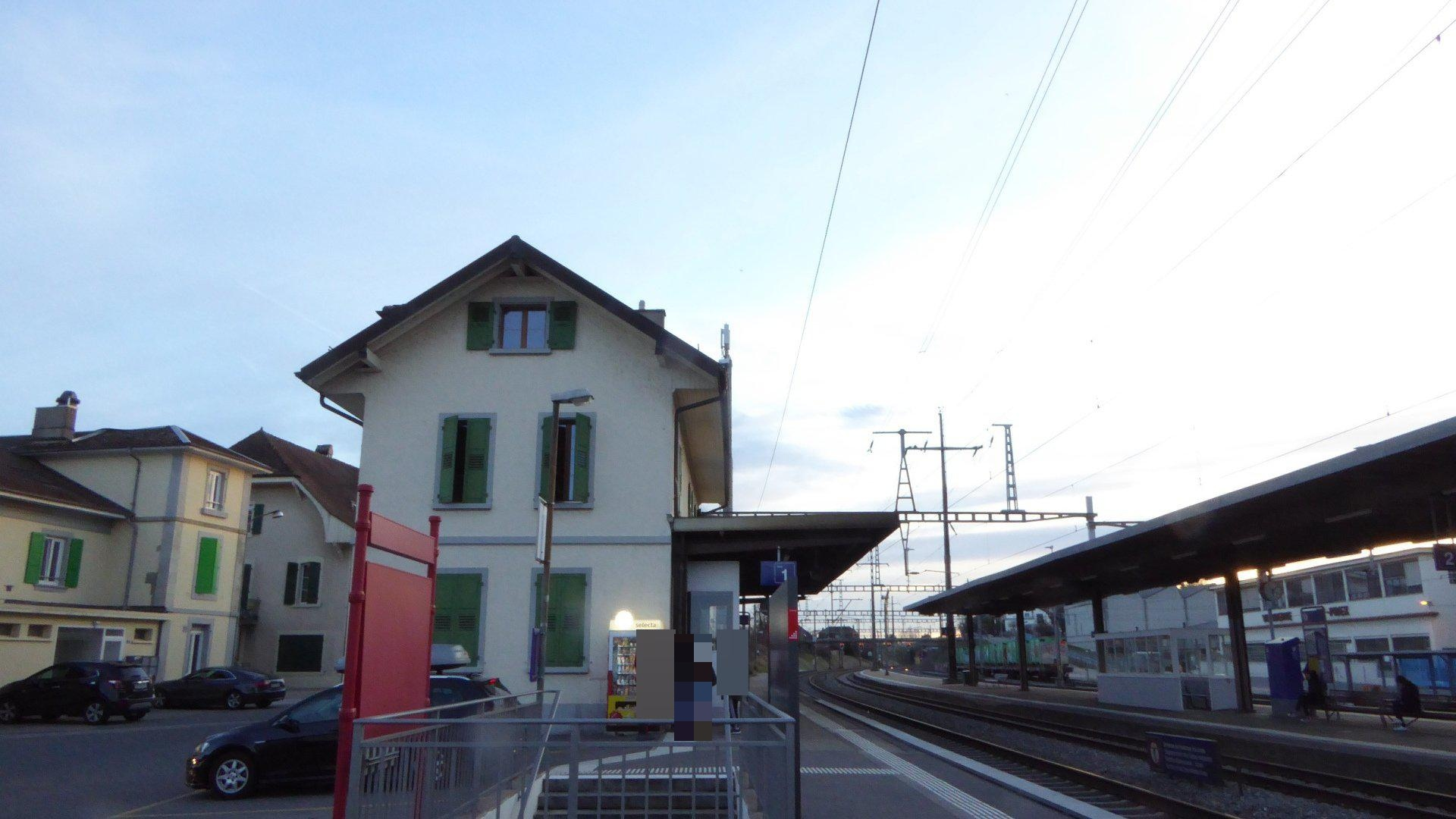
- The station in 2018

General information
- Location: Saint-Prex; Switzerland
- Coordinates: 46°28′56″N 6°27′21″E
- Elevation: 395 m (1,296 ft)
- Owner: Swiss Federal Railways
- Line: Lausanne–Geneva line
- Distance: 16.9 km (10.5 mi) from Lausanne
- Platforms: 2: 1 island platform; 1 side platform
- Tracks: 3
- Train operators: Swiss Federal Railways
- Connections: MBC buses

Construction
- Parking: Yes (60 spaces)
- Cycle facilities: Yes (56 spaces)
- Accessible: No

Other information
- Station code: 8501036 (STP)
- Fare zone: 31 (mobilis)

Passengers
- 2023: 1'700 per weekday (SBB)

Services
Preceding station	RER Vaud	Following station
Etoy towards Allaman	R8	Morges towards Payerne
Etoy towards Allaman	R9	Morges towards Murten/Morat
Location

St-Prex railway station (French: Gare de St-Prex) is a railway station in the municipality of Saint-Prex, in the Swiss canton of Vaud. It is an intermediate stop on the standard gauge Lausanne–Geneva line of Swiss Federal Railways.

== Services ==
As of the December 2024 timetable change, the following services stop at St-Prex:

- RER Vaud R8 / R9: half-hourly service between Allaman and Payerne, with every other train continuing from Payerne to Murten/Morat.
