= Etoy railway station =

Railway station in Etoy, Switzerland

Etoy
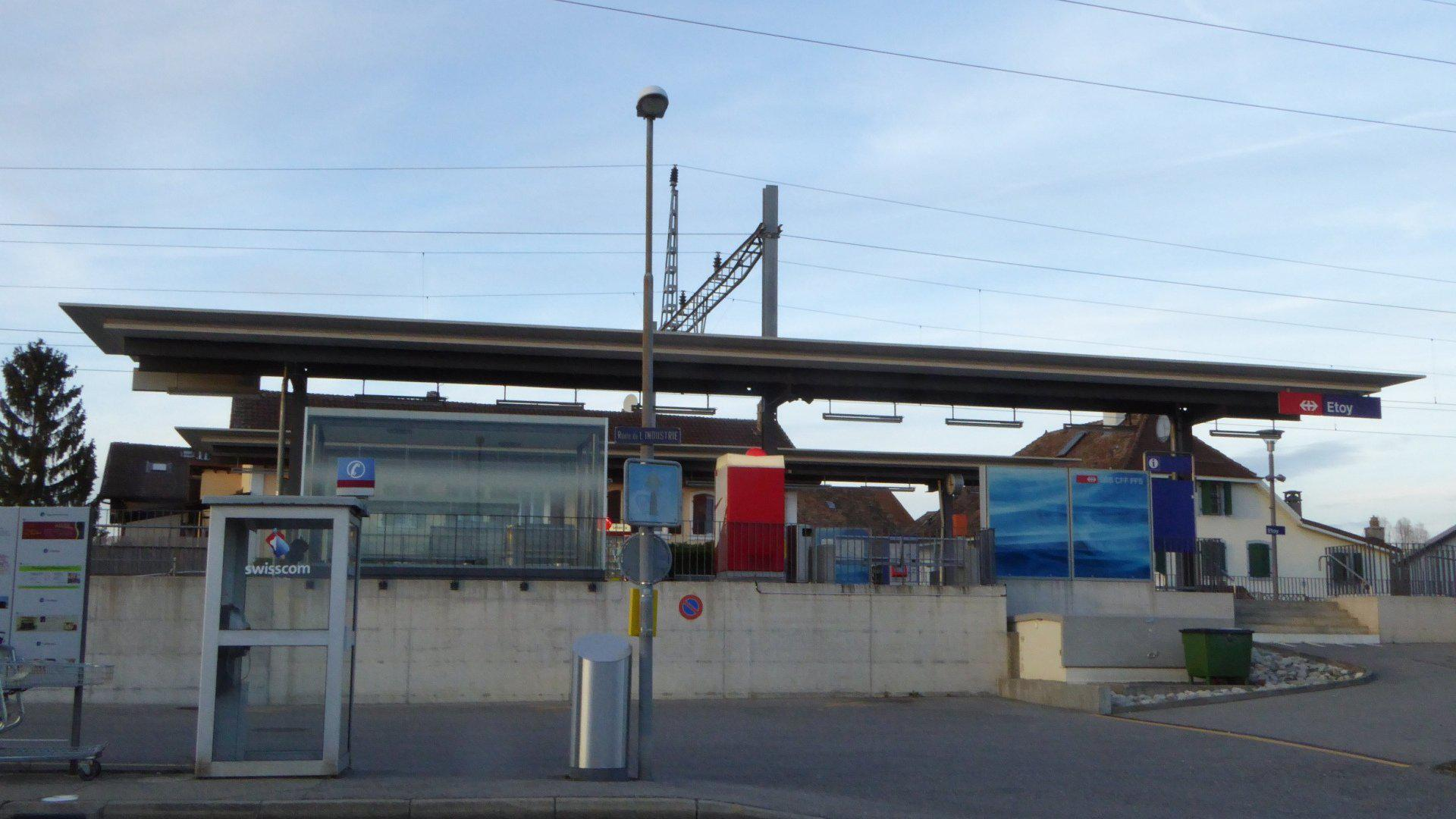
- The station platform in 2018

General information
- Location: Étoy; Switzerland
- Coordinates: 46°28′31″N 6°25′38″E
- Elevation: 406 m (1,332 ft)
- Owner: Swiss Federal Railways
- Line: Lausanne–Geneva line
- Distance: 19.4 km (12.1 mi) from Lausanne
- Platforms: 2 side platforms
- Tracks: 2
- Train operators: Swiss Federal Railways
- Connections: MBC bus line; CarPostal SA buses

Construction
- Parking: Yes (3 spaces)
- Cycle facilities: Yes (15 spaces)
- Accessible: Partly

Other information
- Station code: 8501042 (ETOY)
- Fare zone: 26 (mobilis)

Passengers
- 2023: 1'900 per weekday (SBB)

Services
Preceding station	RER Vaud	Following station
Allaman Terminus	R8	St-Prex towards Payerne
Allaman Terminus	R9	St-Prex towards Murten/Morat
Location

Etoy railway station (French: Gare d'Étoy) is a railway station in the municipality of Etoy, in the Swiss canton of Vaud. It is an intermediate stop on the standard gauge Lausanne–Geneva line of Swiss Federal Railways.

== Services ==
As of the December 2024 timetable change, the following services stop at Etoy:

- RER Vaud R8 / R9: half-hourly service between Allaman and Payerne, with every other train continuing from Payerne to Murten/Morat.
