= Corcelles-Nord railway station =

Railway station in Corcelles-près-Payerne, Switzerland

Corcelles-Nord
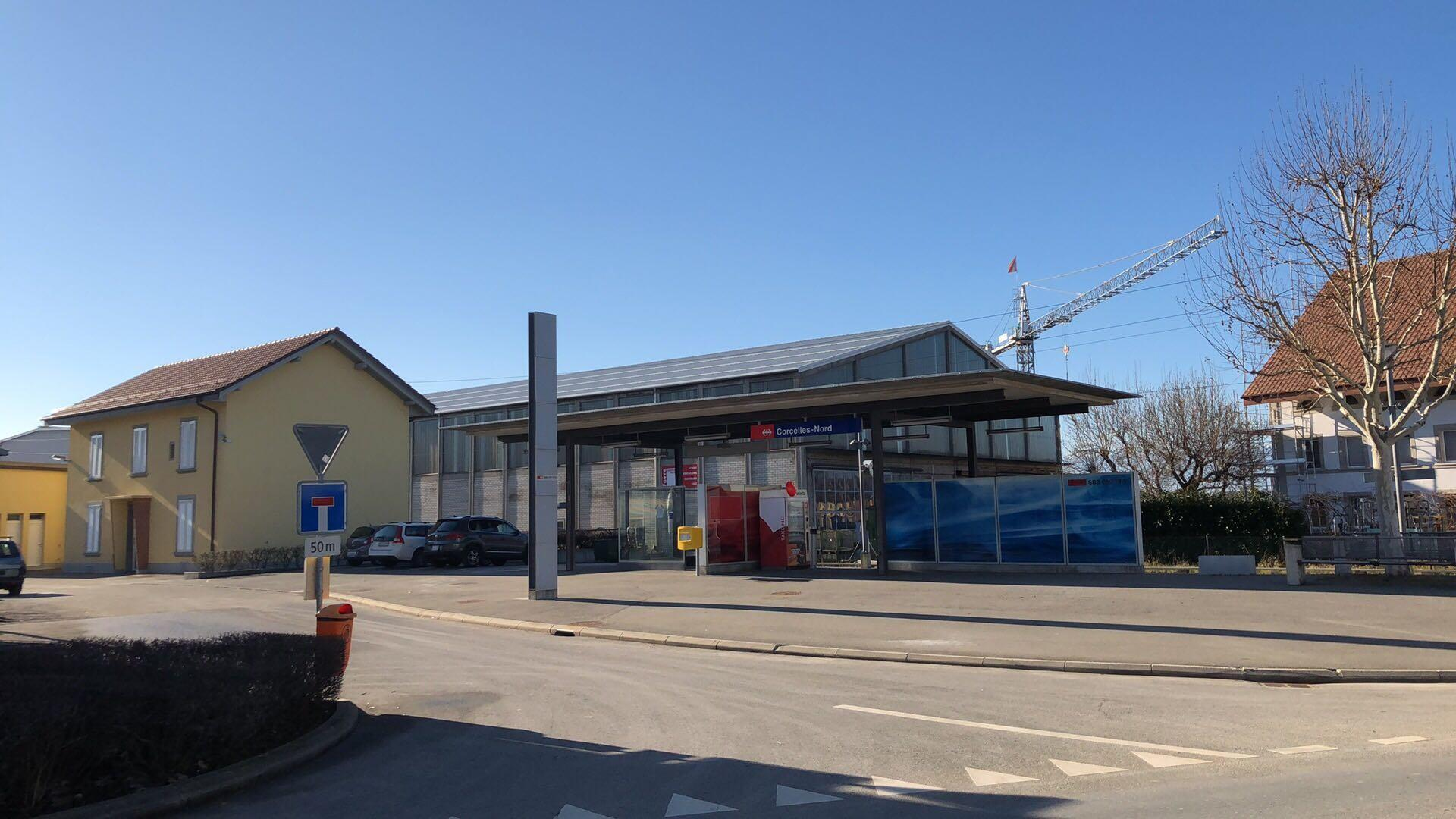
- The station platform in 2019

General information
- Location: Chemin des Répies; Corcelles-près-Payerne; Switzerland
- Coordinates: 46°50′07″N 6°57′37″E
- Elevation: 448 m (1,470 ft)
- Owner: Swiss Federal Railways
- Line: Palézieux–Lyss railway line
- Distance: 60.8 km (37.8 mi) from Lausanne
- Platforms: 1 side platform
- Tracks: 1
- Train operators: Swiss Federal Railways; BLS AG

Construction
- Cycle facilities: Yes (10 spaces)
- Accessible: No

Other information
- Station code: 8504123 (CN)
- Fare zone: 81 (frimobil); 100 (mobilis)

Passengers
- 2023: 210 per weekday (BLS, SBB)

Services
Preceding station	RER Vaud	Following station
Payerne towards Allaman	R9	Dompierre FR towards Murten/Morat
Preceding station	Bern S-Bahn	Following station
Payerne Terminus	S52 Limited service	Dompierre FR towards Bern
Location

Corcelles-Nord railway station (French: Gare de Corcelles-Nord) is a railway station in the municipality of Corcelles-près-Payerne, in the Swiss canton of Vaud. It is an intermediate stop on the standard gauge Palézieux–Lyss line of Swiss Federal Railways. The station is 1 kilometre (0.62 mi) north of Corcelles-Sud on the Fribourg–Yverdon line.

== Services ==
As of the December 2024 timetable change, the following services stop at Corcelles-Nord:

- RER Vaud R9: hourly service between Allaman and Murten/Morat.
- Bern S-Bahn S52: limited service between Bern and Payerne.
