= Henniez railway station =

Railway station in Henniez, Switzerland

Henniez
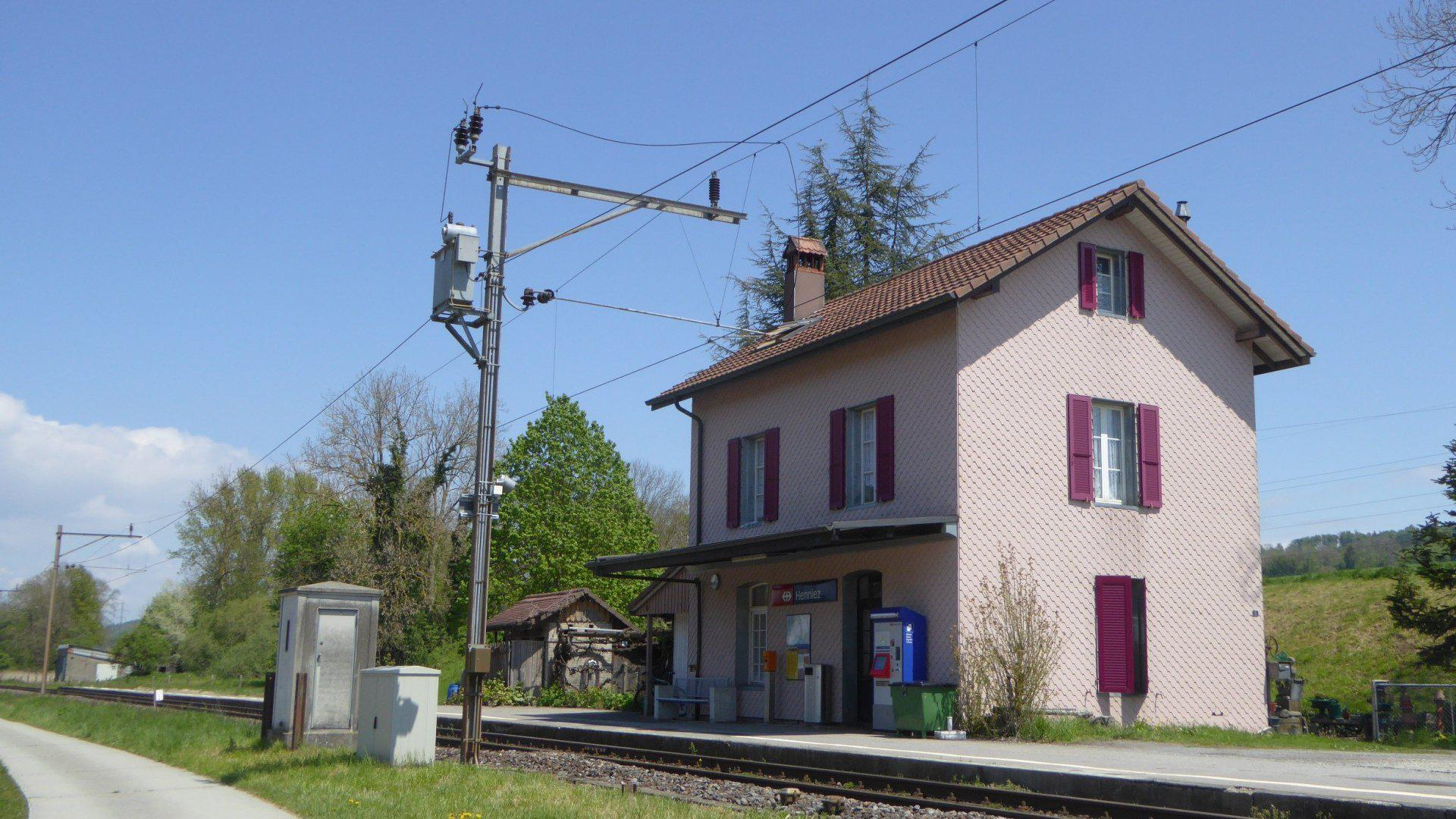
- The station building in 2018

General information
- Location: Henniez; Switzerland
- Coordinates: 46°44′06″N 6°52′12″E
- Elevation: 476 m (1,562 ft)
- Owner: Swiss Federal Railways
- Line: Palézieux–Lyss line
- Distance: 47.2 km (29.3 mi) from Lausanne
- Platforms: 1 side platform
- Tracks: 1
- Train operators: Swiss Federal Railways

Construction
- Cycle facilities: Yes (8 spaces)
- Accessible: Yes

Other information
- Station code: 8504141 (HEN)
- Fare zone: 102 (mobilis)

Passengers
- 2023: 60 per weekday (SBB)

Services
Preceding station	RER Vaud	Following station
Lucens towards Allaman	R9	Granges-Marnand towards Murten/Morat
Location

Henniez railway station (French: Gare de Henniez) is a railway station in the municipality of Henniez, in the Swiss canton of Vaud. It is an intermediate stop on the standard gauge Palézieux–Lyss line of Swiss Federal Railways.

== Services ==
As of the December 2024 timetable change, the following services stop at Henniez:

- RER Vaud R9: hourly service between Allaman and Murten/Morat.
