= Prilly-Malley railway station =

Railway station in Prilly, Switzerland

Prilly-Malley
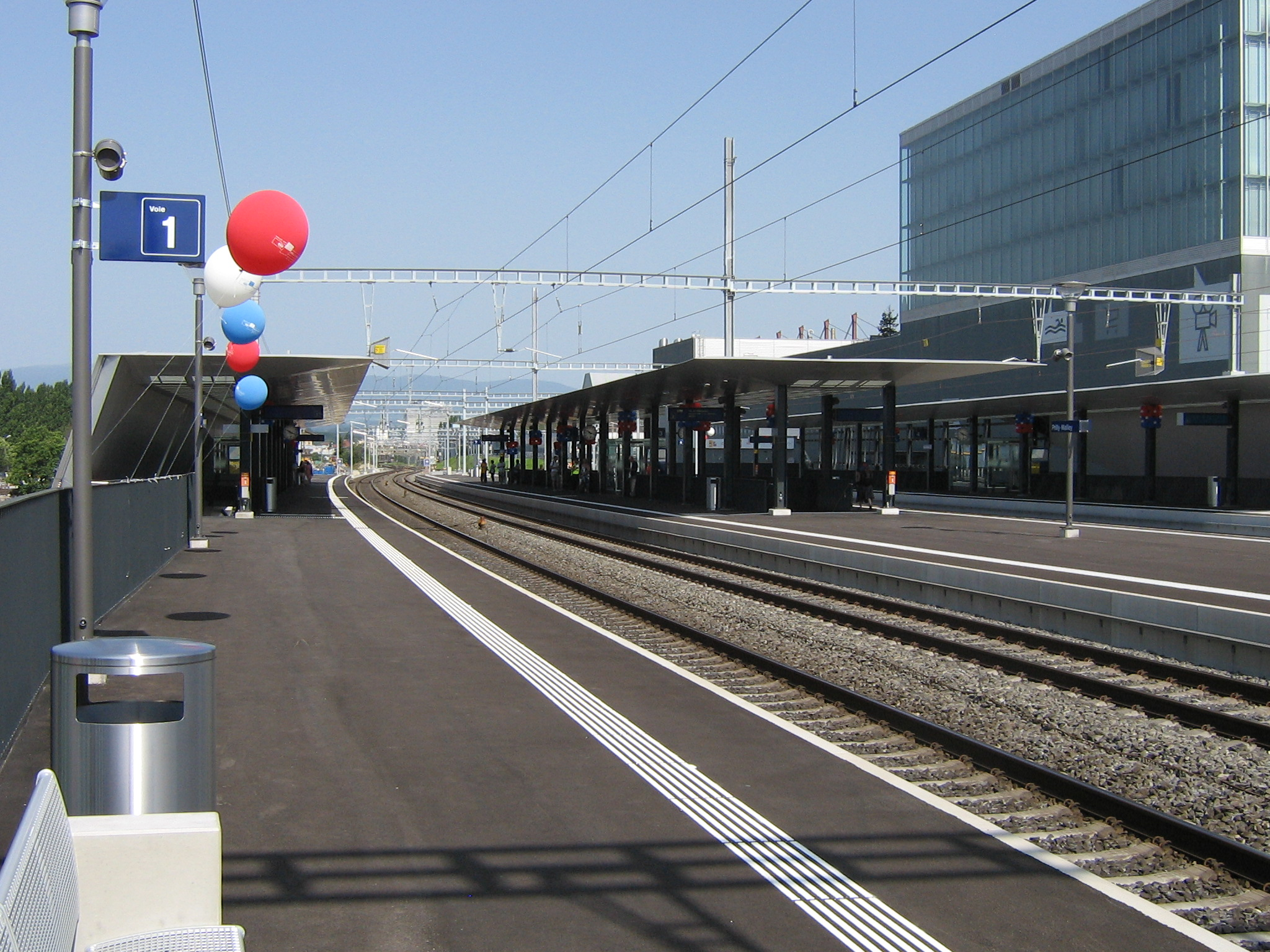
- The station in 2012

General information
- Location: Prilly; Switzerland
- Coordinates: 46°31′36″N 6°36′09″E
- Elevation: 430 m (1,410 ft)
- Owner: Swiss Federal Railways
- Lines: Jura Foot line; Lausanne–Geneva line; Simplon line
- Distance: 2.4 km (1.5 mi) from Lausanne
- Platforms: 4; 1 island platform; 2 side platforms
- Tracks: 4
- Train operators: Swiss Federal Railways
- Connections: Transports publics de la région lausannoise buses

Construction
- Parking: Yes
- Cycle facilities: Yes (60 spaces)
- Accessible: Yes

Other information
- Station code: 8518452 (PRMA)
- Fare zone: 11 and 12 (mobilis)

History
- Opened: 29 June 2012

Passengers
- 2023: 5'400 per weekday (SBB)

Services
Preceding station	RER Vaud	Following station
Renens VD towards Grandson	R1	Lausanne towards Bex
Renens VD towards Grandson	R2	Lausanne towards Bex
Renens VD towards Vallorbe	R3	Lausanne towards Vevey
Renens VD towards Le Brassus or Vallorbe	R4	Lausanne towards Vevey
Renens VD towards Allaman	R9	Lausanne towards Murten/Morat
Location

Prilly-Malley railway station (French: Gare de Prilly-Malley) is a railway station in the municipality of Prilly (in the western suburbs of Lausanne), in the Swiss canton of Vaud. It is an intermediate stop on multiple standard gauge lines of Swiss Federal Railways.

The station opened on June 29, 2012. The canton and the federal government split the construction cost of 65 million francs.

== Services ==
As of the December 2024 timetable change, the following services stop at Prilly-Malley:

- RER Vaud:
  - R1 / R2: half-hourly service between Grandson and Cully.
  - R3 / R4: half-hourly (hourly on weekends) service between Vallorbe and Bex; hourly service to Le Brassus; limited service from Bex to St-Maurice.
  - R9: hourly service between Allaman and Murten/Morat.
