= Faoug railway station =

Railway station in Faoug, Switzerland

Faoug
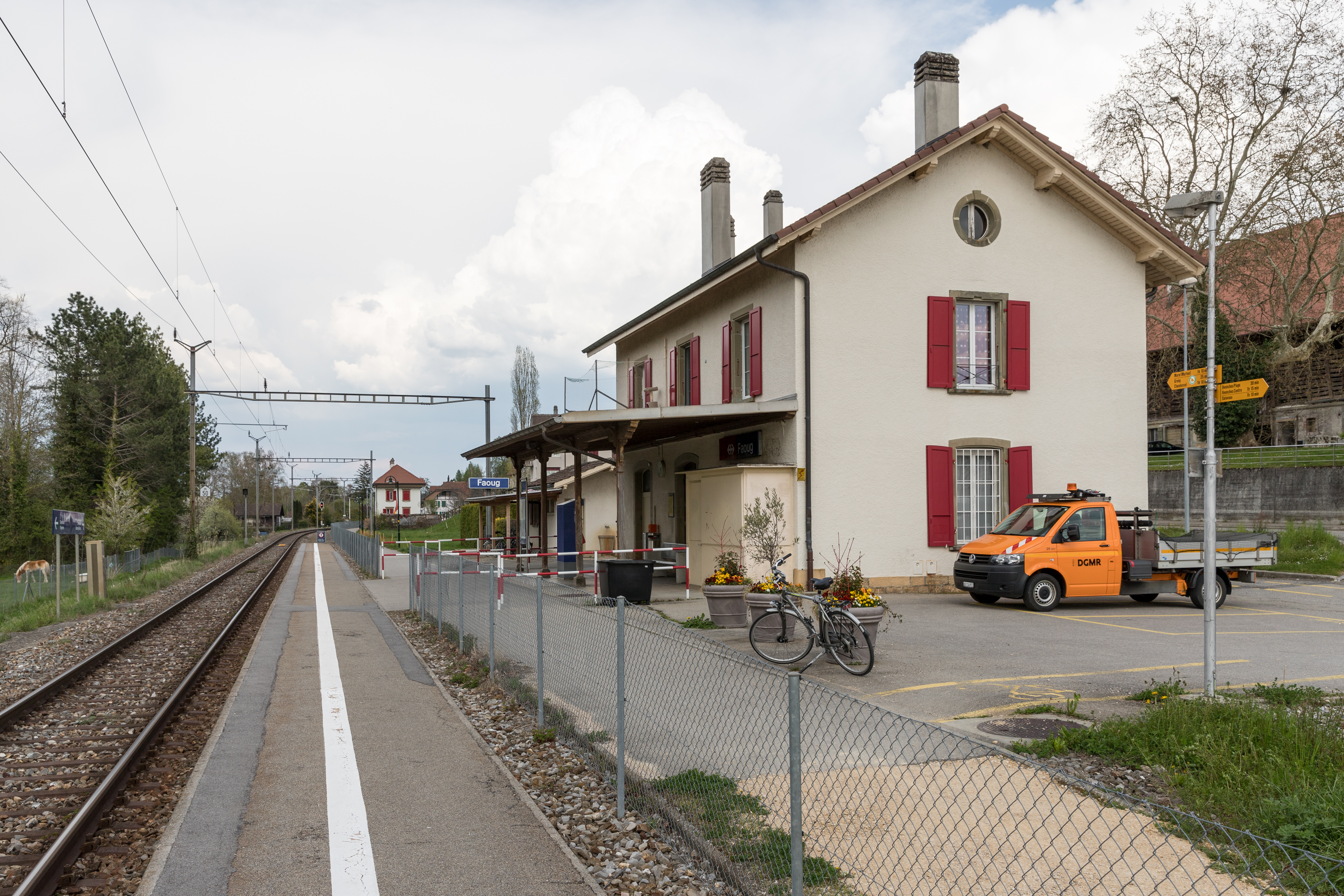
- The station in 2019

General information
- Location: Faoug; Switzerland
- Coordinates: 46°54′30″N 7°04′29″E
- Elevation: 434 m (1,424 ft)
- Owner: Swiss Federal Railways
- Line: Palézieux–Lyss railway line
- Distance: 72.8 km (45.2 mi) from Lausanne
- Platforms: 1 side platform
- Tracks: 1
- Train operators: BLS AG; Swiss Federal Railways

Construction
- Cycle facilities: Yes (17 spaces)
- Accessible: No

Other information
- Station code: 8504127 (FG)
- Fare zone: 50 and 51 (frimobil); 130 (mobilis)

Passengers
- 2023: 220 per weekday (BLS, SBB)

Services
Preceding station	RER Vaud	Following station
Avenches towards Allaman	R9	Murten/Morat Terminus
Preceding station	Bern S-Bahn	Following station
Avenches Terminus	S5	Murten/Morat towards Bern
Location

Faoug railway station (French: Gare de Faoug) is a railway station in the municipality of Faoug, in the Swiss canton of Vaud. It is an intermediate stop on the standard gauge Palézieux–Lyss line of Swiss Federal Railways.

== Services ==
As of the December 2024 timetable change, the following services stop at Faoug:

- RER Vaud R9: hourly service between Allaman and Murten/Morat.
- Bern S-Bahn S5: hourly service between Avenches and Bern.
