= Galmiz railway station =

Railway station in Galmiz, Switzerland

Galmiz
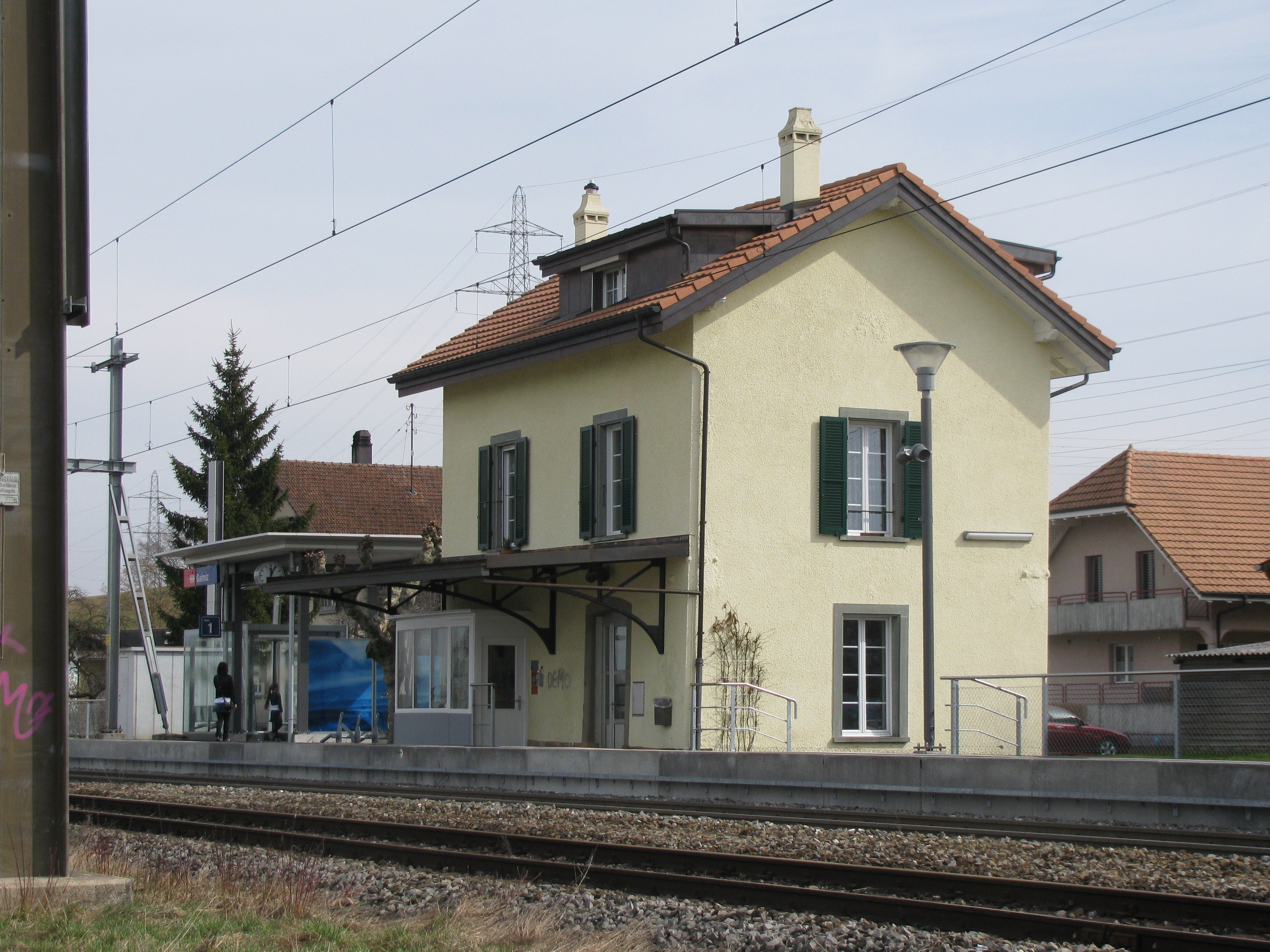
- The station building in 2009

General information
- Location: Galmiz; Switzerland
- Coordinates: 46°57′03″N 7°09′12″E
- Elevation: 437 m (1,434 ft)
- Owner: Swiss Federal Railways
- Line: Palézieux–Lyss railway line
- Distance: 80.7 km (50.1 mi) from Lausanne
- Platforms: 1 side platform
- Tracks: 2
- Train operators: BLS AG

Construction
- Parking: Yes (4 spaces)
- Cycle facilities: Yes (6 spaces)
- Accessible: Yes

Other information
- Station code: 8504129 (GZ)
- Fare zone: 56 (frimobil)

Passengers
- 2023: 170 per weekday (BLS, SBB)

Services
Preceding station	Bern S-Bahn	Following station
Muntelier-Löwenberg towards Avenches	S5	Kerzers towards Bern
Murten/Morat towards Murten/Morat or Payerne	S52	Kerzers towards Bern
Location

Galmiz railway station (German: Bahnhof Galmiz) is a railway station in the municipality of Galmiz, in the Swiss canton of Fribourg. It is an intermediate stop on the standard gauge Palézieux–Lyss line of Swiss Federal Railways.

== Services ==
As of the December 2024 timetable change, the following services stop at Galmiz:

- Bern S-Bahn S5 / S52: half-hourly service between Bern and Murten/Morat; S52 rush-hour trains continue from Murten/Morat to Payerne.
