= Muntelier-Löwenberg railway station =

Railway station in Murten, Switzerland

Muntelier-Löwenberg
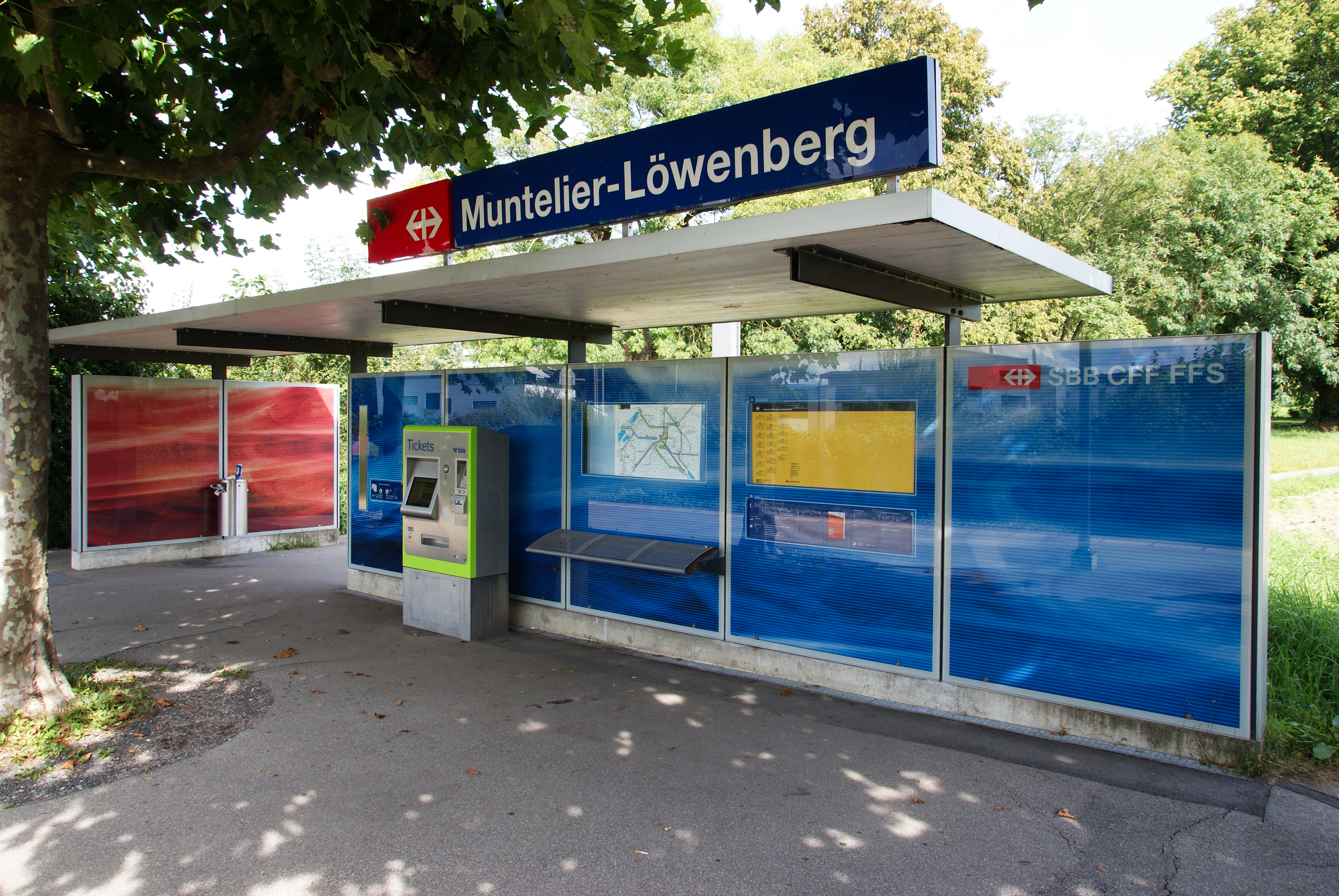
- The platform shelter in 2014

General information
- Location: Murten; Switzerland
- Coordinates: 46°56′17″N 7°08′00″E
- Elevation: 434 m (1,424 ft)
- Owner: Swiss Federal Railways
- Lines: Fribourg–Ins line; Palézieux–Lyss railway line
- Distance: 24.2 km (15.0 mi) from Fribourg/Freiburg; 78.6 km (48.8 mi) from Lausanne
- Platforms: 1 side platform
- Tracks: 1
- Train operators: BLS AG; Transports publics Fribourgeois
- Connections: tpf bus line

Construction
- Cycle facilities: Yes (21 spaces)
- Accessible: No

Other information
- Station code: 8504140 (LOEW)
- Fare zone: 50, 54, and 56 (frimobil)

Passengers
- 2023: 490 per weekday (BLS, SBB, TPF)

Services
Preceding station	RER Fribourg	Following station
Murten/Morat towards Fribourg/Freiburg	S21	Sugiez towards Neuchâtel
Preceding station	Bern S-Bahn	Following station
Murten/Morat towards Avenches	S5	Galmiz towards Bern
Location

Muntelier-Löwenberg railway station (German: Bahnhof Muntelier-Löwenberg, French: Gare de Muntelier-Löwenberg) is a railway station in the municipality of Murten, in the Swiss canton of Fribourg. It is located at the northern junction of the standard gauge Fribourg–Ins and Palézieux–Lyss lines of Swiss Federal Railways. It takes its name from the nearby municipality of Muntelier. This station is served as a request stop.

== Services ==
As of the December 2024 timetable change, the following services stop at Muntelier-Löwenberg:

- Bern S-Bahn S5: hourly service between Avenches and Bern.
- RER Fribourg S21: hourly service between Fribourg/Freiburg and Neuchâtel.
