= Avenches railway station =

Railway station in Avenches, Switzerland

Avenches
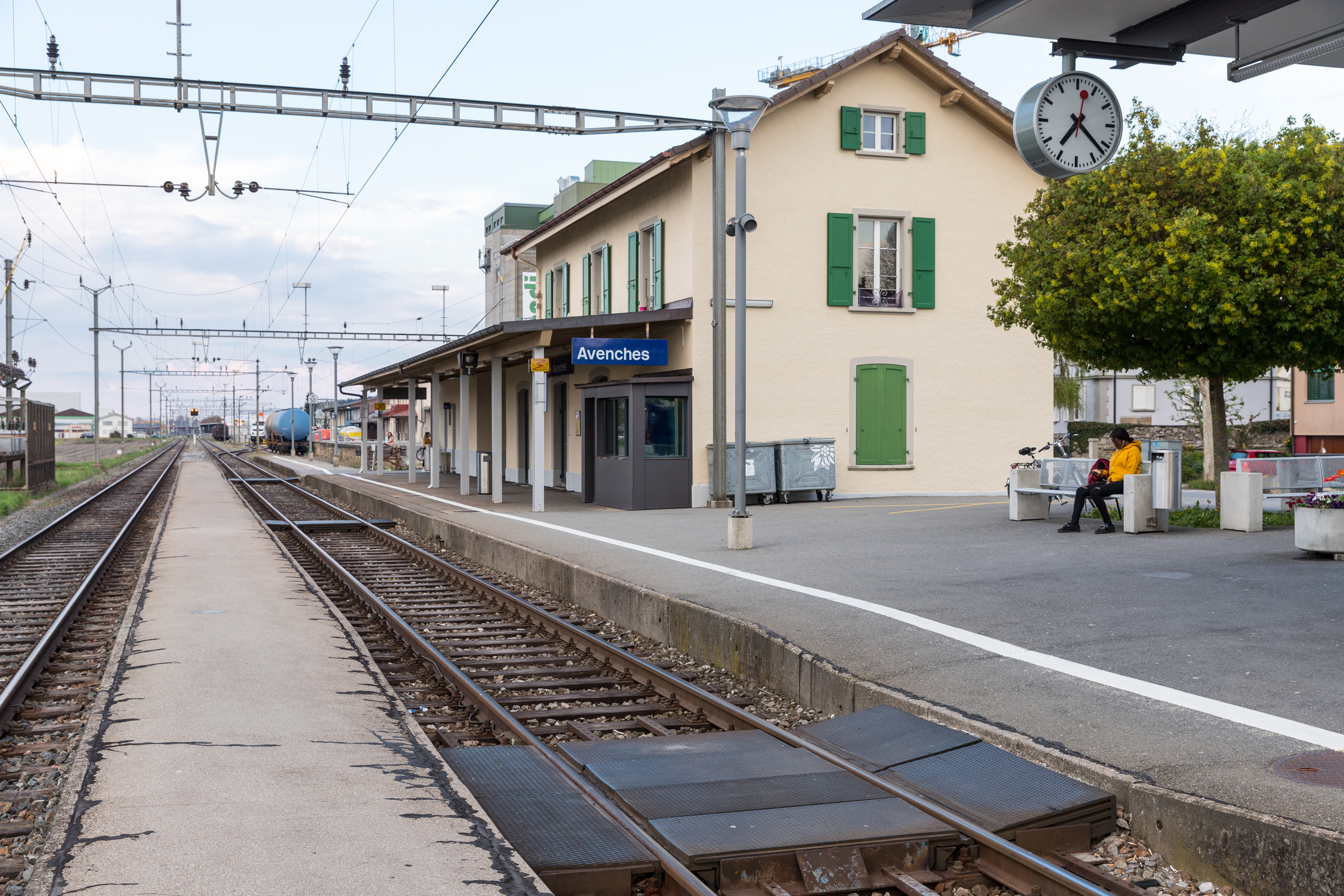
- The station in 2019

General information
- Location: Avenches; Switzerland
- Coordinates: 46°53′05″N 7°02′27″E
- Elevation: 438 m (1,437 ft)
- Owner: Swiss Federal Railways
- Line: Palézieux–Lyss railway line
- Distance: 69.1 km (42.9 mi) from Lausanne
- Platforms: 1 side platform; 1 island platform
- Tracks: 2
- Train operators: BLS AG; Swiss Federal Railways
- Connections: CarPostal SA buses; tpf buses

Construction
- Cycle facilities: 50

Other information
- Station code: 8504126 (AV)
- Fare zone: 51 (frimobil); 130 (Mobilis Vaud)

Passengers
- 2023: 1'000 per weekday (BLS, SBB)

Services
Preceding station	RER Vaud	Following station
Domdidier towards Allaman	R9	Faoug towards Murten/Morat
Preceding station	Bern S-Bahn	Following station
Terminus	S5	Faoug towards Bern
Domdidier towards Payerne	S52 Limited service	Murten/Morat towards Bern
Location

Avenches railway station (French: Gare d'Avenches) is a railway station in the municipality of Avenches, in the Swiss canton of Vaud. It is an intermediate stop on the standard gauge Palézieux–Lyss line of Swiss Federal Railways.

== Services ==
As of the December 2024 timetable change, the following services stop at Avenches:

- RER Vaud R9: hourly service between Allaman and Murten/Morat.
- Bern S-Bahn:
  - S5: hourly service to Bern.
  - S52: limited service between Bern and Payerne.
