= R6 (RER Vaud) =

Railway service in Switzerland

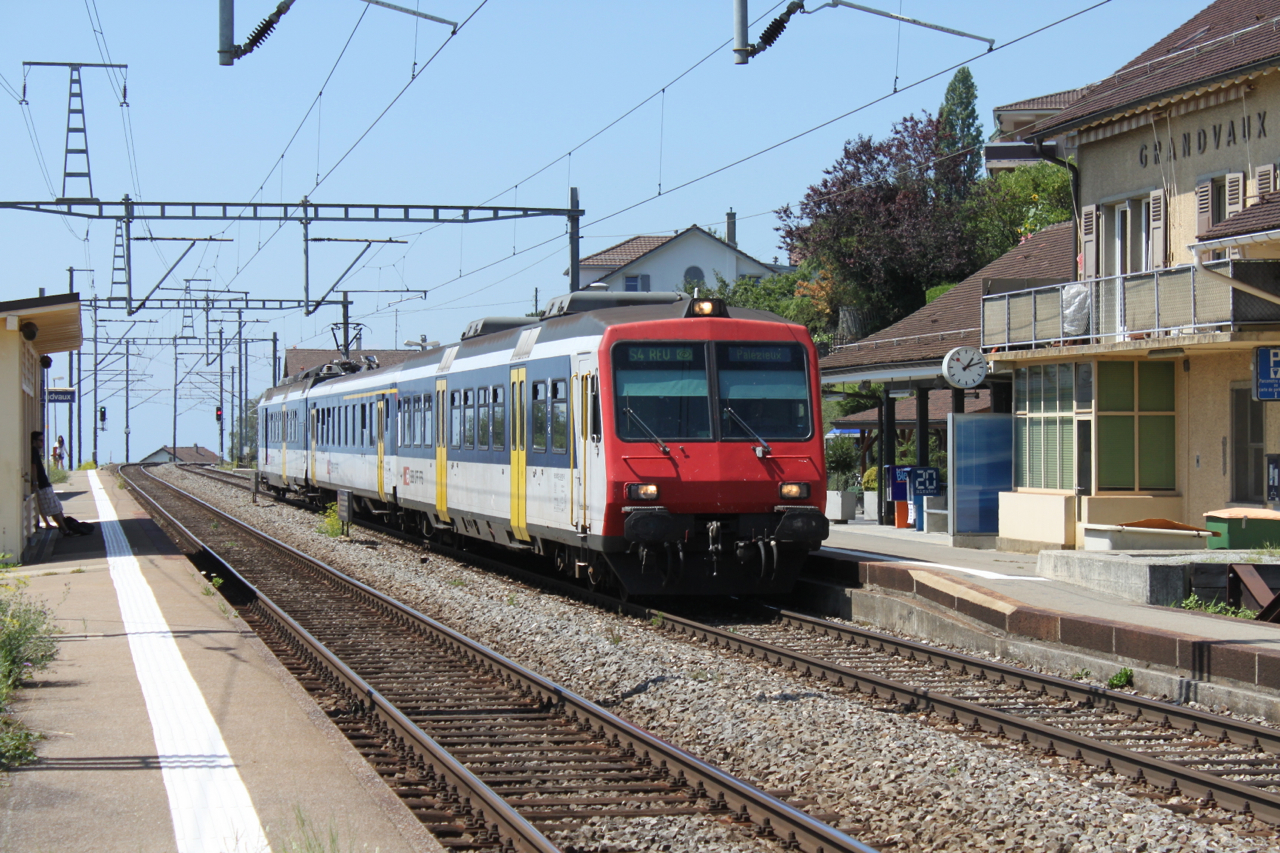
- A Palézieux-bound S4 at Grandvaux in 2009; the S4 became the S6 in December 2022

Overview
- First service: 11 December 2022
- Current operator(s): Swiss Federal Railways

Route
- Termini: Allaman; Romont FR
- Stops: 16
- Distance travelled: 61.7 kilometres (38.3 mi)
- Average journey time: 46 minutes (Allaman–Palézieux); 17 minutes (Palézieux–Romont)
- Service frequency: Hourly
- Line(s) used: Lausanne–Geneva line; Lausanne–Bern line

The R6 is a railway service of RER Vaud that provides hourly service between Allaman and Palézieux in the Swiss canton of Vaud. On weekdays, rush-hour services continue from Palézieux to Romont FR, in Fribourg. Swiss Federal Railways, the national railway company of Switzerland, operates the service. The service was previously known as the S6.

== Operations ==
The R6 operates every hour between Allaman and Palézieux, using the Lausanne–Geneva line between Allaman and Lausanne and the Lausanne–Bern line between Lausanne and Romont FR, via Palézieux. The R6 runs as an express between Morges and Renens VD. It is paired with the R5 between Allaman and Palézieux, providing half-hourly service between the two cities. Between Lausanne and Palézieux the R5 and R6 are joined by the R9, and InterRegio 15; combined there is service over the line roughly every 15 minutes. Northeast of Palézieux, the R6 operates to Romont FR during weekday rush-hour only. It is the only stopping service for Oron and Vauderens.

== History ==
RER Vaud introduced the S6 designation with the December 2020 timetable change, replacing the S5, which was re-routed east of Lausanne to serve Aigle. The RER Vaud lines will be substantially reorganized in the December 2022 timetable change, with the S4 becoming the S6, and the former S6's local schedule being taken over by the S5, which will also be extended to Allaman.

The RER Vaud lines were substantially reorganized for the December 2022 timetable change. The "new" S6 was a renaming of the former S4, making local stops between Lausanne and Palézieux. On 10 December 2023, all RER Vaud lines were renamed as "R" and a number, instead of "S."
