= Étoy, Switzerland =

Étoy
- Municipality
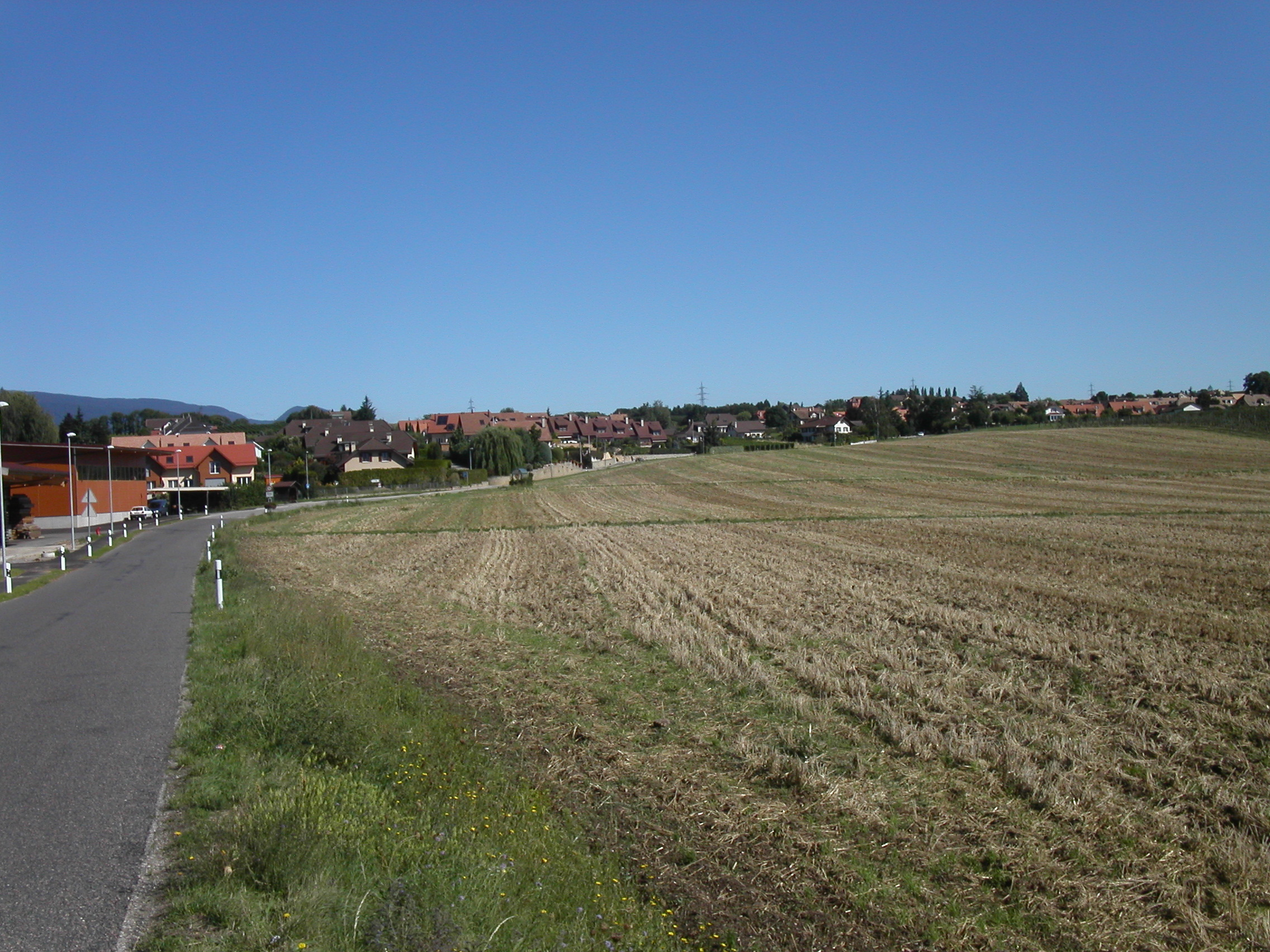
- Étoy village

- Flag Coat of arms
- Location of Étoy
- Location within Switzerland Location within Canton of Vaud
- Coordinates: 46°29′N 06°25′E
- Country: Switzerland
- Canton: Vaud
- District: Morges

Government
  - Mayor: Syndic; Michel Roulet

Area
  - Total: 4.93 km^{2} (1.90 sq mi)
- Elevation: 454 m (1,490 ft)

Population (2003)
  - Total: 2,459
  - Density: 499/km^{2} (1,290/sq mi)
- Time zone: UTC+01:00 (CET)
  - Summer (DST): UTC+02:00 (CEST)
- Postal code: 1163
- SFOS number: 5636
- ISO 3166 code: CH-VD
- Surrounded by: Allaman, Aubonne, Buchillon, Lavigny, Saint-Prex, Villars-sous-Yens
- Website: www.etoy.ch

Étoy (French pronunciation: [etwa]) is a municipality of the canton of Vaud, Switzerland, located in the district of Morges.

== History ==
Étoy was first mentioned in 1145 as Stuie. In 1228 it was mentioned as Estue.

== Geography ==
Étoy has an area, as of 2009, of 4.9 square kilometers (1.9 mi^{2}). Of this area, 3.3 km^{2} (1.3 mi^{2}) or 67.2% is used for agricultural purposes, while 0.33 km^{2} (0.13 mi^{2}) or 6.7% is forested. Of the rest of the land, 1.3 km^{2} (0.50 mi^{2}) or 26.5% is settled (buildings or roads), 0.01 km^{2} (2.5 acres) or 0.2% is either rivers or lakes.

Of the built up area, industrial buildings made up 3.9% of the total area while housing and buildings made up 9.8% and transportation infrastructure made up 10.8% while parks, green belts and sports fields made up 1.2%. Out of the forested land, all of the forested land area is covered with heavy forests. Of the agricultural land, 35.2% is used for growing crops and 2.6% is pastures, while 29.3% is used for orchards or vine crops. All the water in the municipality is flowing water.

The municipality was part of the old Morges District until it was dissolved on 31 August 2006, and Étoy became part of the new district of Morges.

The municipality is located in the La Côte area.

== Coat of arms ==
The blazon of the municipal coat of arms is Per pale; 1. Azure two Keys in saltire Or; 2. Argent a Squirrel Sable.

== Demographics ==
Étoy has a population (as of December 2020) of 2,906. As of 2008, 28.0% of the population are resident foreign nationals. Over the last 10 years (1999–2009) the population has changed at a rate of 25.2%. It has changed at a rate of 15.9% due to migration and at a rate of 9.5% due to births and deaths.

Most of the population (as of 2000) speaks French (1,951 or 85.2%), with Portuguese being second most common (118 or 5.2%) and German being third (93 or 4.1%). There are 32 people who speak Italian and 1 person who speaks Romansh.

Of the population in the municipality 382 or about 16.7% were born in Étoy and lived there in 2000. There were 878 or 38.4% who were born in the same canton, while 443 or 19.4% were born somewhere else in Switzerland, and 533 or 23.3% were born outside of Switzerland.

In 2008 there were 24 live births to Swiss citizens and 11 births to non-Swiss citizens, and in same time span there were 8 deaths of Swiss citizens and 1 non-Swiss citizen death. Ignoring immigration and emigration, the population of Swiss citizens increased by 16 while the foreign population increased by 10. There were 6 Swiss men and 3 Swiss women who immigrated back to Switzerland. At the same time, there were 36 non-Swiss men and 43 non-Swiss women who immigrated from another country to Switzerland. The total Swiss population change in 2008 (from all sources, including moves across municipal borders) was an increase of 42 and the non-Swiss population increased by 84 people. This represents a population growth rate of 5.0%.

The age distribution, as of 2009, in Étoy is; 339 children or 12.6% of the population are between 0 and 9 years old and 435 teenagers or 16.1% are between 10 and 19. Of the adult population, 276 people or 10.2% of the population are between 20 and 29 years old. 435 people or 16.1% are between 30 and 39, 496 people or 18.4% are between 40 and 49, and 320 people or 11.9% are between 50 and 59. The senior population distribution is 234 people or 8.7% of the population are between 60 and 69 years old, 113 people or 4.2% are between 70 and 79, there are 37 people or 1.4% who are between 80 and 89, and there are 13 people or 0.5% who are 90 and older.

As of 2000, there were 1,115 people who were single and never married in the municipality. There were 1,029 married individuals, 45 widows or widowers and 100 individuals who are divorced.

As of 2000, there were 822 private households in the municipality, and an average of 2.5 persons per household. There were 233 households that consist of only one person and 56 households with five or more people. Out of a total of 845 households that answered this question, 27.6% were households made up of just one person and there were 2 adults who lived with their parents. Of the rest of the households, there were 197 married couples without children and 335 married couples with children. There were 38 single parents with a child or children. There were 17 households that were made up of unrelated people and 23 households that were made up of some sort of institution or another collective housing.

In 2000 there were 196 single family homes (or 55.1% of the total) out of a total of 356 inhabited buildings. There were 87 multi-family buildings (24.4%), along with 46 multi-purpose buildings that were mostly used for housing (12.9%) and 27 other use buildings (commercial or industrial) that also had some housing (7.6%). Of the single family homes 43 were built before 1919, while 60 were built between 1990 and 2000. The most multi-family homes (31) were built between 1981 and 1990 and the next most (19) were built before 1919. There were 7 multi-family houses built between 1996 and 2000.

In 2000 there were 927 apartments in the municipality. The most common apartment size was 3 rooms of which there were 241. There were 57 single room apartments and 260 apartments with five or more rooms. Of these apartments, a total of 767 apartments (82.7% of the total) were permanently occupied, while 135 apartments (14.6%) were seasonally occupied and 25 apartments (2.7%) were empty. As of 2009, the construction rate of new housing units was 2.2 new units per 1000 residents. The vacancy rate for the municipality, in 2010, was 0.87%.

The historical population is given in the following chart:

== Sights ==
The entire village of Étoy is designated as part of the Inventory of Swiss Heritage Sites. The village was among several early tile making centres in Vaud, and a line of chestnut trees leads from the site of the former tuilerie to a quay at the lake.

== Politics ==
In the 2007 federal election the most popular party was the SP which received 23.92% of the vote. The next three most popular parties were the Green Party (17.7%), the SVP (15.94%) and the FDP (15.2%). In the federal election, a total of 544 votes were cast, and the voter turnout was 44.4%.

== Economy ==
As of 2010, Étoy had an unemployment rate of 3.9%. As of 2008, there were 107 people employed in the primary economic sector and about 16 businesses involved in this sector. 298 people were employed in the secondary sector and there were 33 businesses in this sector. 1,253 people were employed in the tertiary sector, with 105 businesses in this sector. There were 1,183 residents of the municipality who were employed in some capacity, of which females made up 44.1% of the workforce.

In 2008 the total number of full-time equivalent jobs was 1,388. The number of jobs in the primary sector was 65, all of which were in agriculture. The number of jobs in the secondary sector was 284 of which 135 or (47.5%) were in manufacturing and 148 (52.1%) were in construction. The number of jobs in the tertiary sector was 1,039. In the tertiary sector; 487 or 46.9% were in wholesale or retail sales or the repair of motor vehicles, 63 or 6.1% were in the movement and storage of goods, 52 or 5.0% were in a hotel or restaurant, 14 or 1.3% were in the information industry, 5 or 0.5% were the insurance or financial industry, 65 or 6.3% were technical professionals or scientists, 9 or 0.9% were in education and 305 or 29.4% were in health care.

In 2000, there were 902 workers who commuted into the municipality and 897 workers who commuted away. The municipality is a net importer of workers, with about 1.0 workers entering the municipality for every one leaving. About 5.8% of the workforce coming into Étoy are coming from outside Switzerland. Of the working population, 13% used public transportation to get to work, and 70.7% used a private car.

== Religion ==
From the 2000 census, 801 or 35.0% were Roman Catholic, while 920 or 40.2% belonged to the Swiss Reformed Church. Of the rest of the population, there were 16 members of an Orthodox church (or about 0.70% of the population), there were 2 individuals (or about 0.09% of the population) who belonged to the Christian Catholic Church, and there were 123 individuals (or about 5.37% of the population) who belonged to another Christian church. There were 4 individuals (or about 0.17% of the population) who were Jewish, and 19 (or about 0.83% of the population) who were Islamic. There were 2 individuals who were Buddhist, 3 individuals who were Hindu and 2 individuals who belonged to another church. 345 (or about 15.07% of the population) belonged to no church, are agnostic or atheist, and 110 individuals (or about 4.81% of the population) did not answer the question.

== Education ==
In Étoy about 720 or (31.5%) of the population have completed non-mandatory upper secondary education, and 410 or (17.9%) have completed additional higher education (either university or a Fachhochschule). Of the 410 who completed tertiary schooling, 46.1% were Swiss men, 32.0% were Swiss women, 13.9% were non-Swiss men and 8.0% were non-Swiss women.

In the 2009/2010 school year there were a total of 427 students in the Étoy school district. In the Vaud cantonal school system, two years of non-obligatory pre-school are provided by the political districts. During the school year, the political district provided pre-school care for a total of 631 children of which 203 children (32.2%) received subsidized pre-school care. The canton's primary school program requires students to attend for four years. There were 224 students in the municipal primary school program. The obligatory lower secondary school program lasts for six years and there were 198 students in those schools. There were also 5 students who were home schooled or attended another non-traditional school.

As of 2000, there were 27 students in Étoy who came from another municipality, while 311 residents attended schools outside the municipality.

GEMS World Academy Switzerland was located in Étoy, but is now closed.

== Transport ==
The municipality has a railway station, Etoy, on the Lausanne–Geneva line. It has regular service to Allaman, Lausanne, and Palézieux.
