= Oron railway station =

Railway station in Oron, Switzerland

Oron
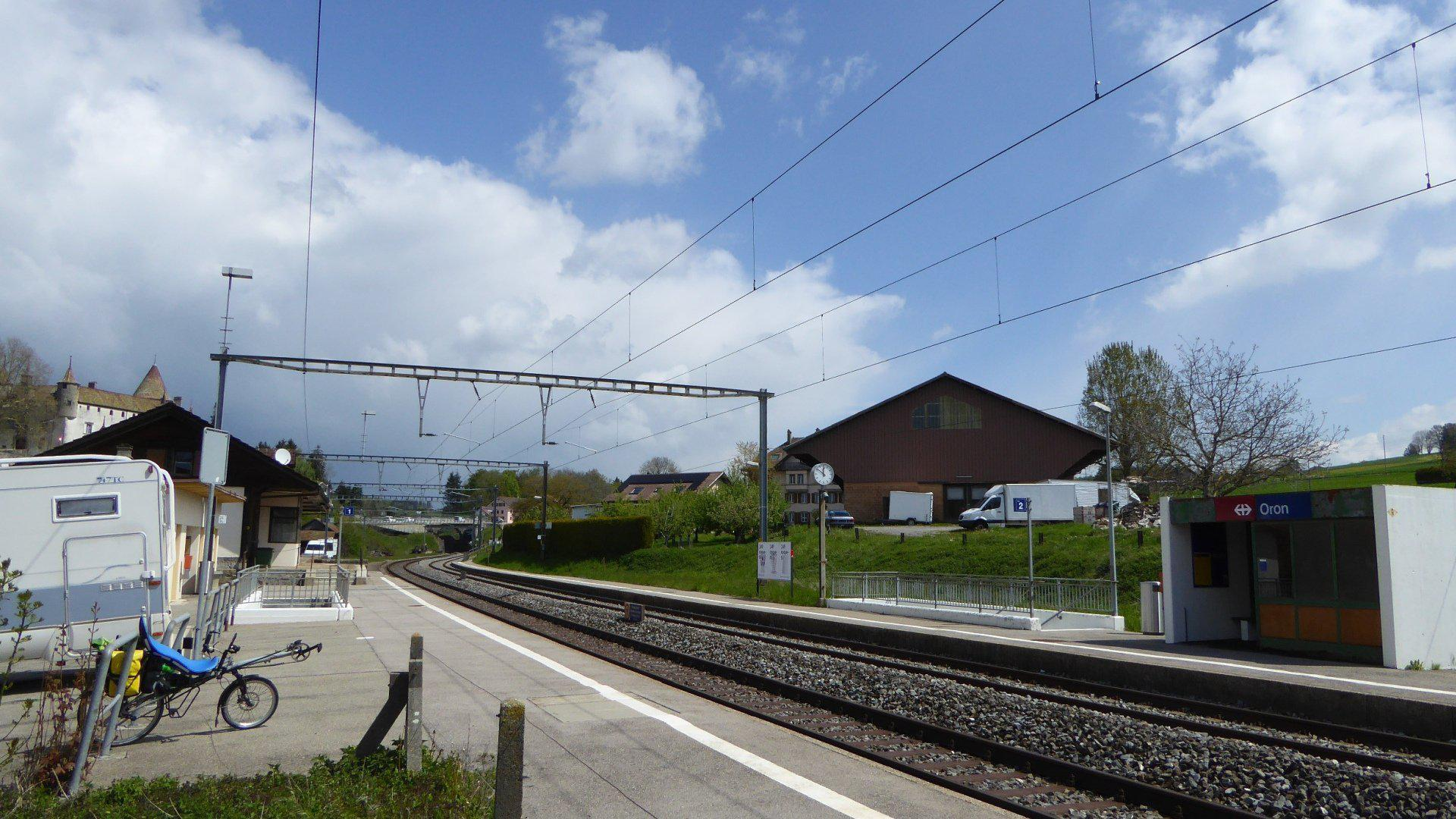
- The station platforms in 2018

General information
- Location: Oron; Switzerland
- Coordinates: 46°34′21″N 6°50′14″E
- Elevation: 700 m (2,300 ft)
- Owner: Swiss Federal Railways
- Line: Lausanne–Bern line
- Distance: 24.4 km (15.2 mi) from Lausanne
- Platforms: 2 side platforms
- Tracks: 2
- Train operators: Swiss Federal Railways
- Connections: CarPostal SA bus line; Transports publics Fribourgeois buses

Construction
- Parking: Yes (10 spaces)
- Accessible: No

Other information
- Station code: 8504020 (OR)
- Fare zone: 62 (mobilis); 92 (frimobil)

Passengers
- 2023: Fewer than 50 persons per day (SBB)

Services
Preceding station	RER Vaud	Following station
Palézieux towards Lausanne	S41	Romont FR towards Fribourg/Freiburg
Location

Oron railway station (French: Gare d'Oron) is a railway station in the municipality of Oron, in the Swiss canton of Vaud. It is an intermediate stop on the standard gauge Lausanne–Bern line of Swiss Federal Railways.

== Services ==
As of the December 2024 timetable change, the following services stop at Oron:

- RER Vaud S41: hourly service between Lausanne and Fribourg/Freiburg.
