= R8 (RER Vaud) =

Railway service in Switzerland

Overview
- First service: 10 December 2017
- Current operator: Swiss Federal Railways

Route
- Termini: Allaman; Payerne
- Stops: 15
- Distance travelled: 80.0 kilometres (49.7 mi)
- Average journey time: 1 hour 25 minutes
- Service frequency: Hourly
- Lines used: Palézieux–Lyss line; Lausanne–Bern line; Lausanne–Geneva line

The R8 is a railway service of RER Vaud that provides hourly service between Allaman and Payerne in the Swiss canton of Vaud. Swiss Federal Railways, the national railway company of Switzerland, operates the service. The service was previously known as the S8.

== Operations ==
The R8 operates every hour between Allaman and Payerne, using the Lausanne–Geneva line between Allaman and Lausanne, the Lausanne–Bern line between Lausanne and Palézieux, and the Palézieux–Lyss line between Palézieux and Payerne. The R8 runs as an express between Lausanne and Palézieux, stopping only at Puidoux. The S40 and S41 make local stops, combining with the R8, R9 and the InterRegio 15 for service roughly every 15 minutes. North of Palézieux, the R9 pairs with the R8 for half-hourly service to Payerne.

== History ==
SBB introduced the S8 in December 2017. It operated on weekdays only. With the December 2021 timetable change, the S8 began operating on Saturdays as well. On 10 December 2023, it began operating on Sundays as well. In addition, all RER Vaud lines were renamed as "R" and a number, instead of "S". In December 2024, the R8 was extended to Allaman, replacing the R5 and R6 on the Allaman–Lausanne section.
