= Payerne railway station =

Railway station in Payerne, Switzerland

Payerne
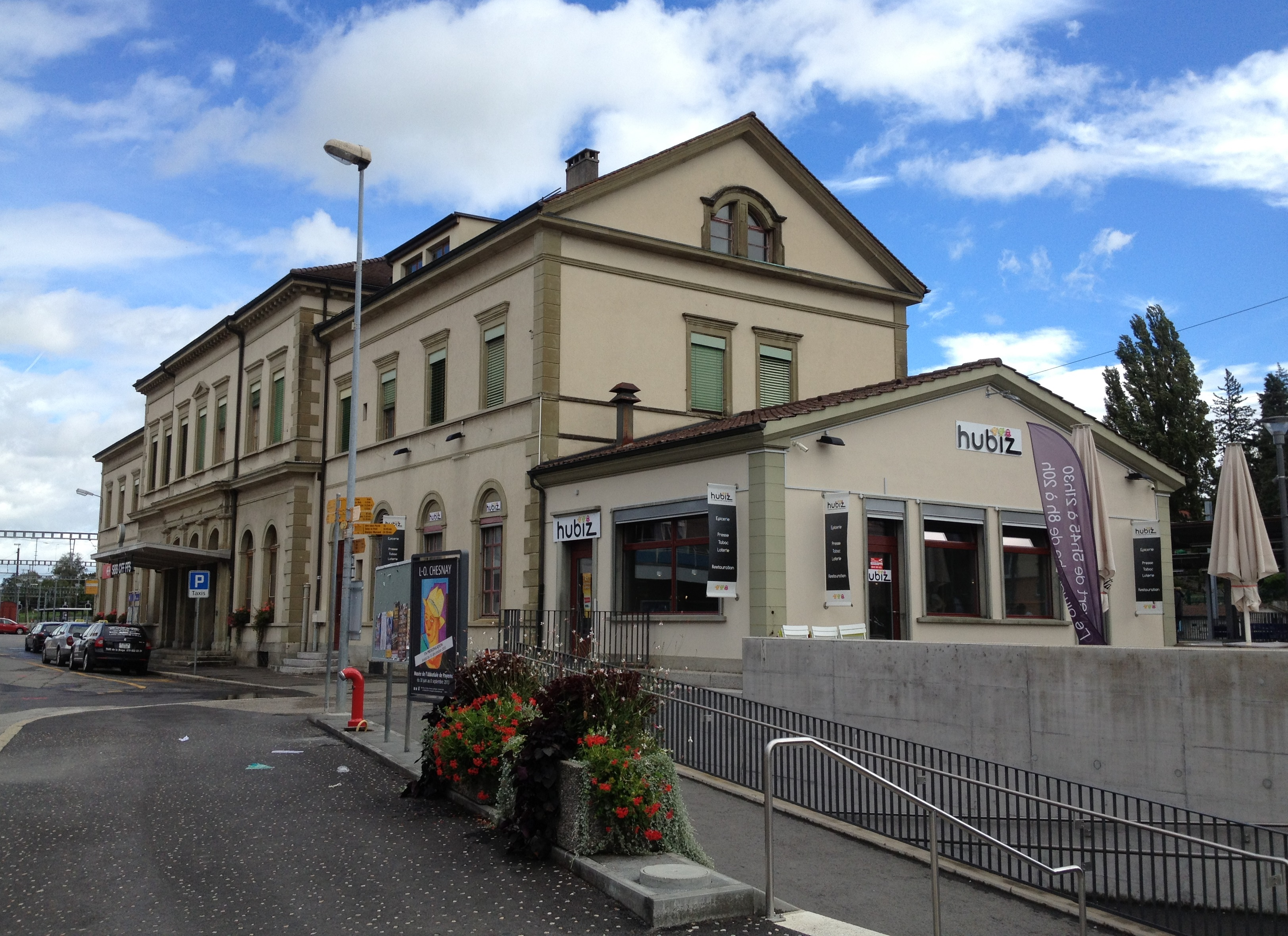
- The station building in 2013

General information
- Location: Payerne; Switzerland
- Coordinates: 46°49′11″N 6°56′24″E
- Elevation: 451 m (1,480 ft)
- Owner: Swiss Federal Railways
- Lines: Fribourg–Yverdon line; Palézieux–Lyss line
- Distance: 27.9 km (17.3 mi) from Yverdon-les-Bains; 58.5 km (36.4 mi) from Lausanne
- Platforms: 5: 1 side platform; 2 island platforms
- Tracks: 5
- Train operators: BLS AG; Swiss Federal Railways
- Connections: CarPostal SA buses; tpf bus line

Construction
- Parking: Yes (86 spaces)
- Cycle facilities: Yes (72 spaces)
- Accessible: Yes

Other information
- Station code: 8504134 (PAY)
- Fare zone: 81 (frimobil); 100 (mobilis)

Passengers
- 2023: 6'900 per weekday (BLS, SBB)

Services
Preceding station	RER Fribourg	Following station
Cugy FR towards Yverdon-les-Bains	S30	Corcelles-Sud towards Fribourg/Freiburg
Cugy FR towards Yverdon-les-Bains	S30	Corcelles-Sud towards Fribourg/Freiburg
Preceding station	RER Vaud	Following station
Granges-Marnand towards Allaman	R8	Terminus
Granges-Marnand towards Allaman	R9	Corcelles-Nord towards Murten/Morat
Preceding station	Bern S-Bahn	Following station
Terminus	S52 Limited service	Corcelles-Nord towards Bern
Location

Payerne railway station (French: Gare de Payerne) is a railway station in the municipality of Payerne, in the Swiss canton of Vaud. It is located at the junction of the standard gauge Fribourg–Yverdon and Palézieux–Lyss lines of Swiss Federal Railways.

== Services ==
As of the December 2024 timetable change, the following services stop at Payerne:

- Bern S-Bahn S52: limited service to Bern.
- RER Vaud R8 / R9: half-hourly service to Allaman and hourly service to Murten/Morat.
- RER Fribourg S30 S30: half-hourly service between Yverdon-les-Bains and Fribourg/Freiburg.
