= Murten/Morat railway station =

Railway station in Murten/Morat, Switzerland

Murten/Morat
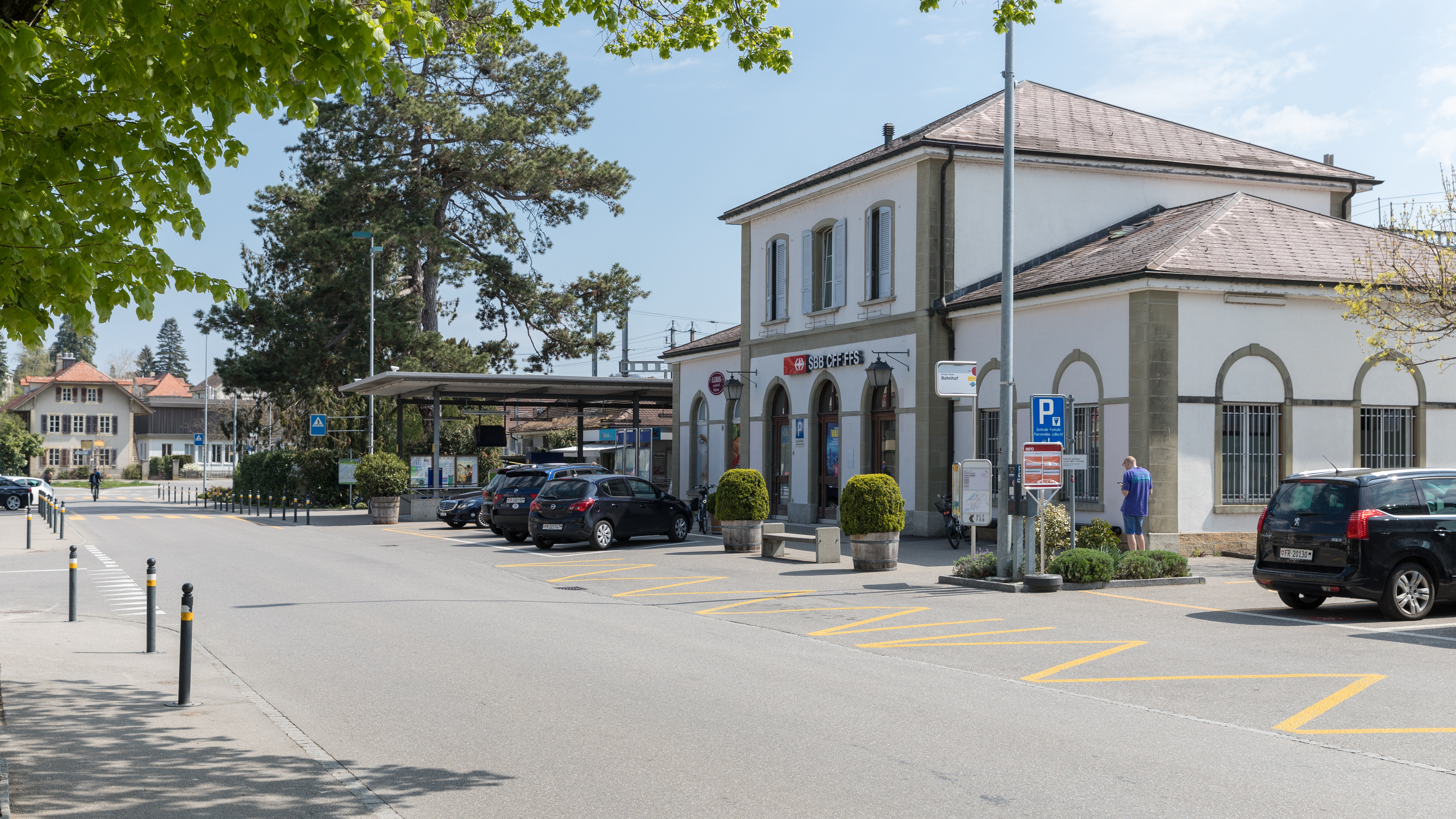
- The station building in 2019

General information
- Location: Murten; Switzerland
- Coordinates: 46°55′31″N 7°06′55″E
- Elevation: 453 m (1,486 ft)
- Owner: Swiss Federal Railways
- Lines: Fribourg–Ins line; Palézieux–Lyss railway line
- Distance: 22.2 km (13.8 mi) from Fribourg/Freiburg; 76.5 km (47.5 mi) from Lausanne
- Platforms: 2 side platforms; 1 island platform
- Tracks: 4
- Train operators: BLS AG; Swiss Federal Railways; Transports publics Fribourgeois
- Connections: PostAuto AG bus line; Transports publics Fribourgeois buses

Construction
- Parking: Yes (74 spaces)
- Cycle facilities: Yes (200 spaces)
- Accessible: Yes

Other information
- Station code: 8504128 (MRT)
- Fare zone: 50 (frimobil)

History
- Former names: Murten (until 2012)

Passengers
- 2023: 3'600 per weekday (BLS, SBB, TPF)

Services
Preceding station	RER Vaud	Following station
Faoug towards Allaman	R9	Terminus
Preceding station	RER Fribourg	Following station
Münchenwiler-Courgevaux towards Fribourg/Freiburg	S20	Sugiez towards Neuchâtel
Münchenwiler-Courgevaux towards Fribourg/Freiburg	S21	Muntelier-Löwenberg towards Neuchâtel
Preceding station	Bern S-Bahn	Following station
Faoug towards Avenches	S5	Muntelier-Löwenberg towards Bern
Terminus	S52	Galmiz towards Bern
Avenches towards Payerne	S52 Limited service	Galmiz towards Bern
Location

Murten/Morat railway station (German: Bahnhof Murten, French: Gare de Morat) is a railway station in the municipality of Murten, in the Swiss canton of Fribourg. It is located at the southern junction of the standard gauge Fribourg–Ins and Palézieux–Lyss lines of Swiss Federal Railways.

== Services ==
As of the December 2024 timetable change, the following services stop at Murten/Morat:

- Bern S-Bahn:
  - S5: hourly service between Avenches and Bern.
  - S52: hourly service to Bern and rush-hour service to Payerne.
- RER Vaud R9: hourly service to Allaman.
- RER Fribourg S20 / S21: half-hourly service between Neuchâtel and Fribourg/Freiburg.
