= R9 (RER Vaud) =

Railway service in Switzerland

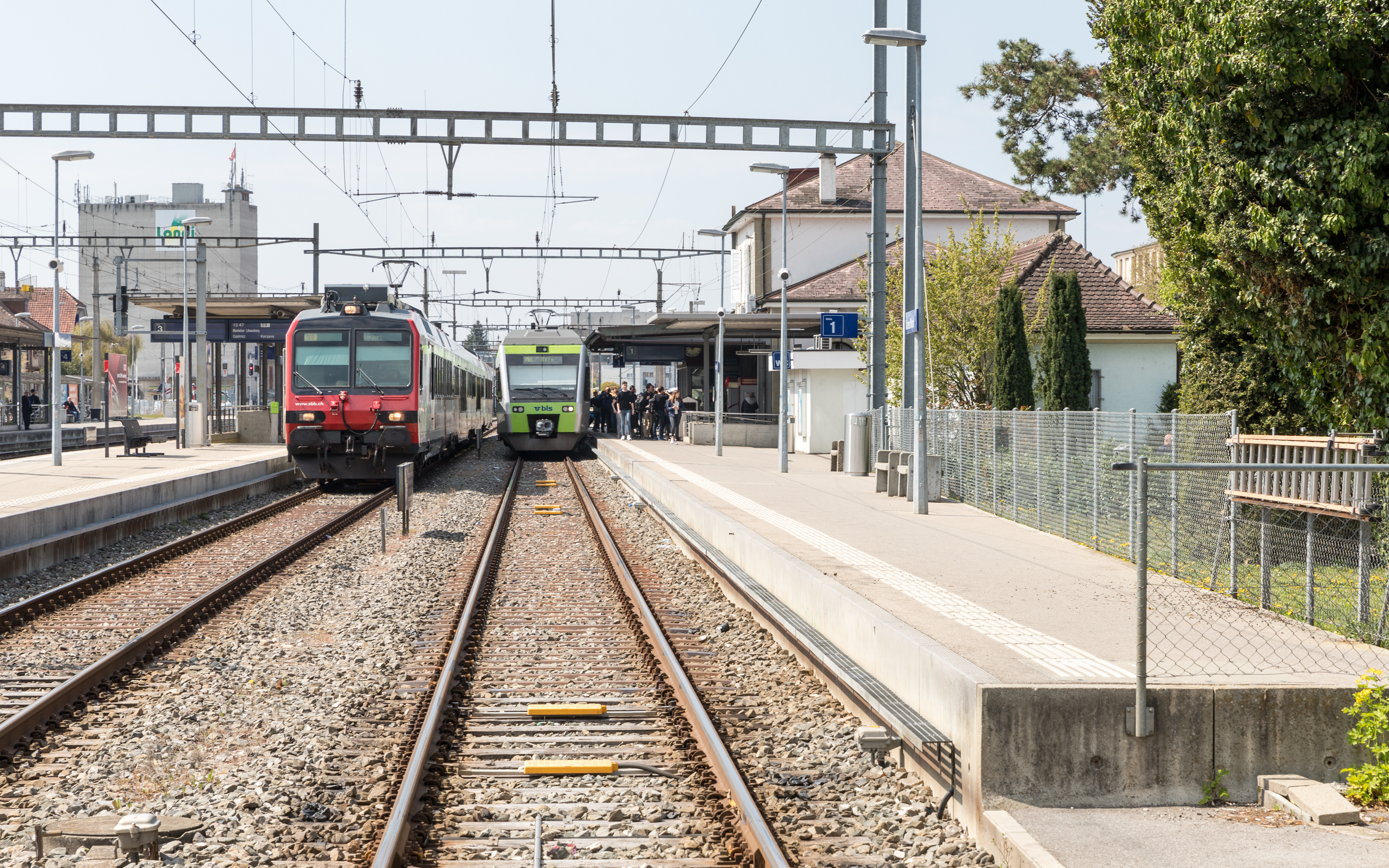
- An S9 (left) and Bern S-Bahn S5 (right) at Murten/Morat in 2019

Overview
- First service: 13 December 2015
- Current operator: Swiss Federal Railways

Route
- Termini: Allaman; Murten/Morat
- Stops: 23
- Distance travelled: 98.0 kilometres (60.9 mi)
- Average journey time: 1 hour 50 minutes
- Service frequency: Hourly
- Lines used: Palézieux–Lyss line; Lausanne–Bern line; Lausanne–Geneva line

The R9 is a railway service of RER Vaud that provides hourly service between Allaman and Murten/Morat in the Swiss cantons of Vaud and Fribourg, respectively. Swiss Federal Railways, the national railway company of Switzerland, operates the service. The service was previously known as the S9.

== Operations ==
The R9 operates every hour between Lausanne and Murten/Morat, using the Lausanne–Bern line between Lausanne and Palézieux, and the Palézieux–Lyss line between Palézieux and Murten/Morat. The R9 runs as an express between Lausanne and Palézieux, stopping only at Puidoux. The S40 and S40 make local stops, combining with the R8, R9 and the InterRegio 15 for service roughly every 15 minutes. North of Palézieux, the R8 pairs with the R9 for half-hourly service to Payerne. Between Payerne and Murten/Morat, the Bern S-Bahn S5 runs hourly to Avenches and the S52 runs limited service to Payerne.

== History ==
RER Vaud introduced the S9 designation with the December 2015 timetable change, replacing the S21. Both routes operated between Lausanne and Payerne. The S9 was extended from Payerne to Kerzers in December 2017.

On 10 December 2023, all RER Vaud lines were renamed as "R" and a number, instead of "S". In December 2024, the R9 was cut back from Kerzers to Murten/Morat and extended from Lausanne to Allaman, replacing the R5 and R6 on that section.
