= Allaman railway station =

Railway station in Allaman, Switzerland

Allaman
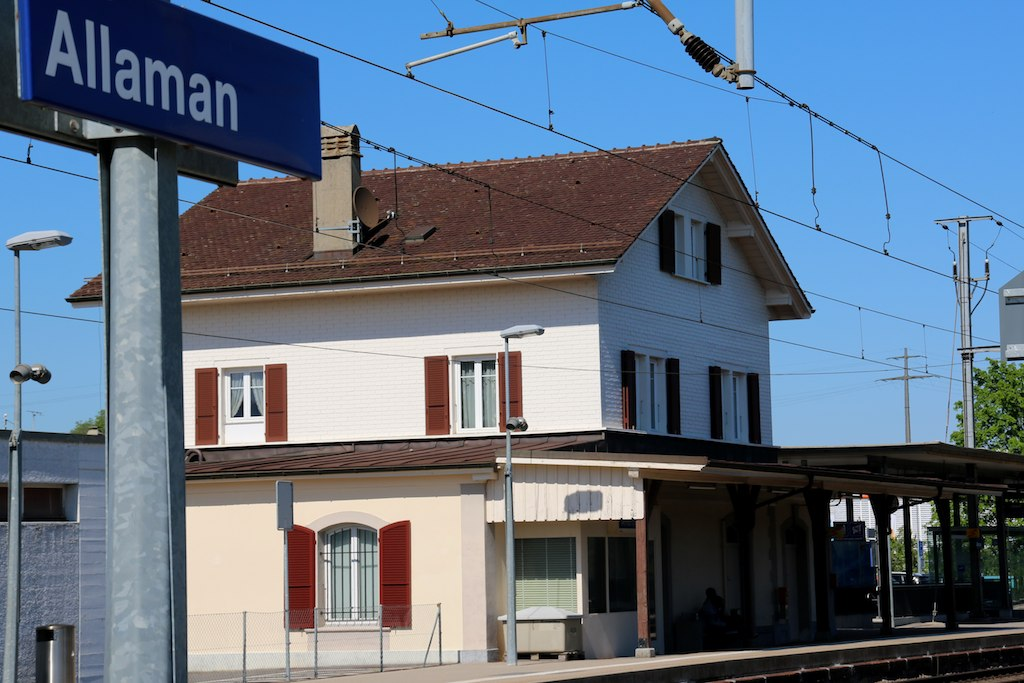
- The station building in 2014

General information
- Location: Allaman; Switzerland
- Coordinates: 46°28′33″N 6°23′59″E
- Elevation: 421 m (1,381 ft)
- Owner: Swiss Federal Railways
- Line: Lausanne–Geneva line
- Distance: 21.5 km (13.4 mi) from Lausanne
- Platforms: 3: 1 island platform; 1 side platform
- Tracks: 3
- Train operators: Swiss Federal Railways
- Connections: MBC bus line; CarPostal SA buses

Construction
- Parking: Yes (88 spaces)
- Cycle facilities: Yes (31 spaces)
- Accessible: Yes

Other information
- Station code: 8501035 (ALL)
- Fare zone: 26 (mobilis)

Passengers
- 2023: 5'800 per weekday (SBB)

Services
Preceding station	SBB CFF FFS	Following station
Rolle towards Annemasse or Geneva Airport	RE33	Morges towards St-Maurice or Martigny
Preceding station	RER Vaud	Following station
Terminus	R8	Etoy towards Payerne
Terminus	R9	Etoy towards Murten/Morat
Location

Allaman railway station (French: Gare d'Allaman) is a railway station in the municipality of Allaman, in the Swiss canton of Vaud. It is an intermediate stop on the standard gauge Lausanne–Geneva line of Swiss Federal Railways.

== Services ==
As of the December 2024 timetable change, the following services stop at Allaman:

- RegioExpress: half-hourly service (hourly on weekends) between Annemasse and St-Maurice, and hourly service from St-Maurice to Martigny. On weekends, hourly service to Geneva Airport.
- RER Vaud R8 / R9: half-hourly service to Payerne, with every other train continuing from Payerne to Murten/Morat.
