= Palézieux–Lyss railway =

Railway line in Switzerland

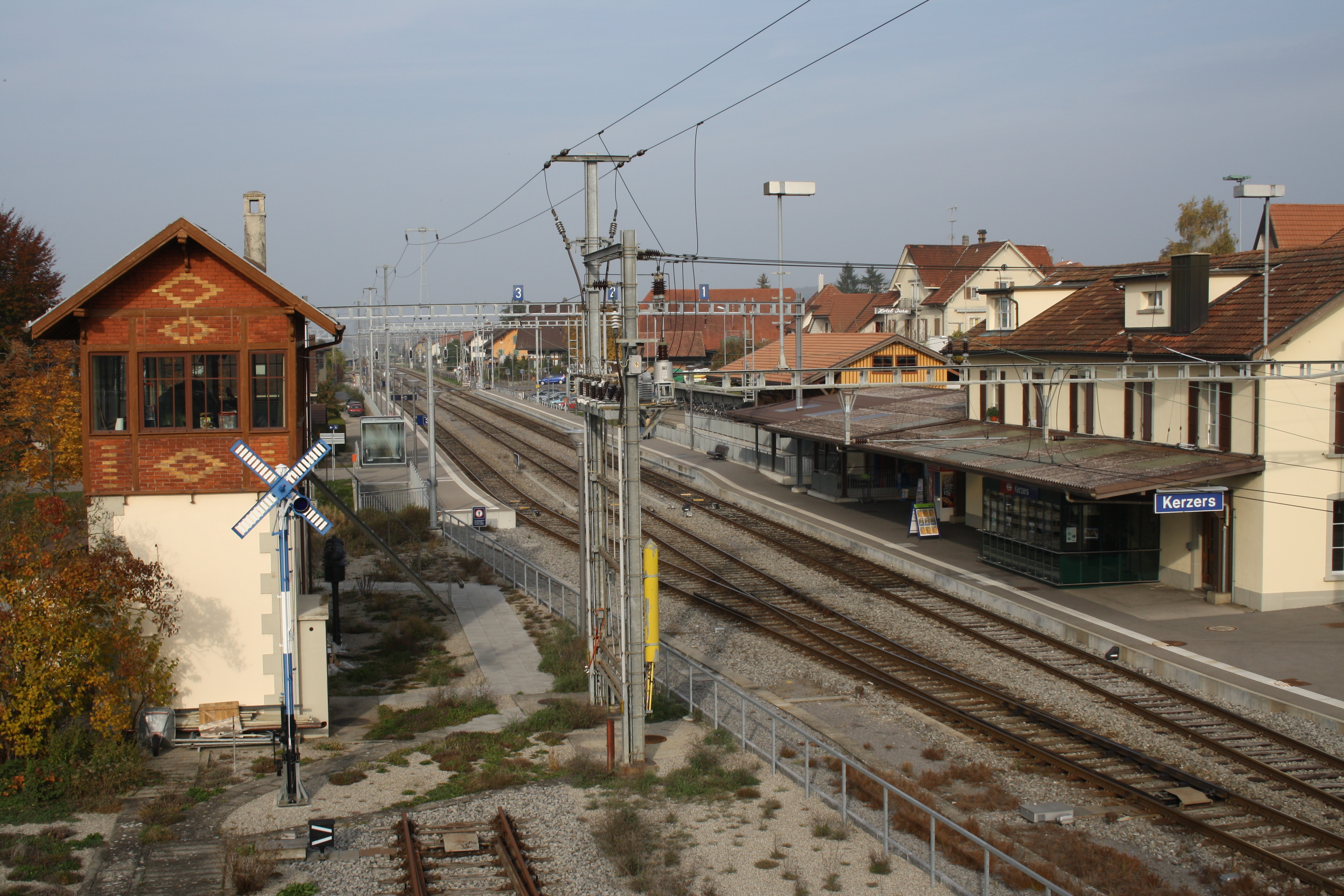
- Kerzers station

Overview
- Owner: Swiss Federal Railways
- Line number: 251, 305, 291
- Termini: Palézieux; Lyss

Technical
- Line length: 79.7 km (49.5 mi)
- Number of tracks: 1
- Track gauge: 1,435 mm (4 ft 8 1/2 in)
- Electrification: 15 kV 16.7 Hz AC overhead catenary

The Palézieux–Lyss railway is a single-track standard-gauge line of the Swiss Federal Railways (SBB) in Romandy.

The section south of Kerzers is sometimes considered to form one of two lines that intersect at Payerne station and are referred to in French as the Ligne de la Broye (Broye line) or in German as the Broyelinien (Broye lines) or Broyetallinien (Broye valley lines). The Palézieux–Lyss railway includes the Broye longitudinal (Palézieux–Payerne–Murten–Kerzers). The Fribourg–Yverdon railway is considered to form the Broye transversal (Yverdon-les-Bains–Payerne–Fribourg/Freiburg). The lines are named after the Broye river, which passes through the cantons of Vaud and Fribourg, crossing the cantonal border ten times in total.

== History ==
The line was opened in two stages:

- 12 June 1876: Murten–Kerzers–Lyss,
- 25 August 1876: Murten–Palézieux

The line between Palézieux and Fräschels was owned by the Western Swiss Railways (Chemins de fer de la Suisse Occidentale), which already operated the Jura Foot Railway via Yverdon and the Lausanne–Bern railway via Fribourg. The Jura bernois also opened its section between Fräschels and Lyss on 12 June 1876, so that the Murten–Kerzers–Lyss section went in operation on the same day, although owned by two companies. The competition from the two established main lines and the rural character of the catchment area never allowed the Palézieux–Lyss railway to advance beyond the status of a secondary line. Various mergers of railway companies led to the line becoming wholly owned by the SBB at its foundation in 1903.

Most of the line was electrified in 1944–1947, late by Swiss standards and reflecting its low traffic. The Murten–Muntelier section had already been electrified at 750 Volt using side-contact third rail between 1903 and 1947 for the trains of the Chemin de fer Fribourg–Morat–Anet (FMA).

== Route ==
The Palézieux–Kerzers route runs in a predominantly northeastern direction, always along the Broye river to Lake Morat. In the first section to Moudon, which also has the only tunnel of the line, the maximum slope is 1.9%; afterwards the line is flatter. At the entrance to Kerzers station, the Bern–Neuchâtel railway is crossed at an acute angle at grade. The station itself, operated jointly by the SBB and BLS, underwent a fundamental reconstruction between 2003 and 2005. The mechanical signal box built in 1896 is preserved as a museum.
