= Envy, Switzerland =

Coordinates: 46°41′24″N 6°27′31″E

Envy is a village and former municipality in the district of Orbe in the canton of Vaud, Switzerland.

It was first recorded in year 1216 as Envi.

The municipality had 58 inhabitants in 1764, which increased to 61 in 1798 and 90 in 1850. It then decreased to 88 in 1900 and 45 in 1960.

In 1970 the municipality was merged with the neighboring municipality Romainmôtier to form a new and larger municipality Romainmôtier-Envy.
