= Political Disorder =

Performance art by Abel Azcona

- Artist: Abel Azcona
- Year: 2017
- Type: Performance art
- Location: Romainmôtier, Switzerland

Political Disorder is a conceptual, critical and process artwork by Abel Azcona. For Political Disorder, Azcona joined many different institutions and political parties. The work was made up of dozens of original documents of affiliation to dozens of political parties in Spain, membership cards or documentation of fees and payments. The piece, in which Azcona joins all the Spanish political parties, is a critique of the system that prioritizes economic interest over true ideology. Azcona joined Falange Española, Vox, the Spanish Socialist Workers' Party and the Popular Party. He also became a member of entities with a political connotation such as the extreme right-wing organization Hazte Oír, the Francisco Franco National Foundation, the Spanish Nazi organization Hogar Social and the "Christian Lawyers". The multi-year project concluded at the Andrés-Missirlian Space Museum in Romainmôtier, Switzerland in 2017. In this exhibition, Azcona included the expulsion letters of each of the political parties and organizations.
