= Katharina von Arx =

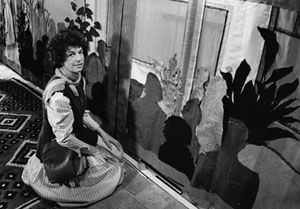
Von Arx in 1985

Katharina von Arx (full name Edith Catherine Drilhon-von Arx). (b. April 5, 1928 – d. October 25, 2013) was a journalist and artist known for her travel writing and restoration of the Maison du Prieuré in Romainmôtier, a national heritage site in Switzerland. She is also known for promoting utopian visions in her writing as well as in a textile art project called Histoires des villes (History of Cities).

== Life ==
Von Arx was born in a town called Niedergösgen (Kt. Solothurn) near Zurich, Switzerland. In 1933 her family moved to Zurich, where she attended school including graduating from a trade school for women in 1947.

She was restless and curious by nature and according to her daughter, fascinated by stories, whether they be spoken, written or depicted pictorially.

From 1952 to 1953 she studied drawing at the Academy of Fine Arts in Vienna where she met Friedrich Hundertwasser who became a mentor and longtime friend. Hundertwasser told her to paint what she feared to make it more tolerable. She left the academy at age 25 to travel the world, drawing, painting, translating and even singing Swiss folk songs in the streets to earn money to live and move on to the next place. In the end she circled the globe in the northern hemisphere. As a travel writer, she was sent to the Tonga Islands in the Pacific. Here she met journalist and photographer Freddy Drilhon, to whom she was married until his death in 1976. The couple had one daughter, Fréderiqué Drilhon von Arx, born in 1958.

During a family vacation in 1959, the couple found a medieval building called the Maison du Prieuré (Priory House), located in the small town of Romainmôtier in Switzerland. At the time, it was in danger of being demolished by local authorities, but Katharina fell in love with it and the couple bought it to settle down and raise their child. Despite being over fifteen centuries old and visited by kings, it had become forgotten and was in decrepit condition. Katharina worked to save the building, writing about, promoting its historical value and founding a private association dedicated to saving it. It took thirty years to raise the money and restore the building and today it is a national monument.

She lived in the house for over fifty years, until her death in 2013 at age 85.

== Writing career ==
Although she trained as a visual artist, Von Arx’s career was focused on writing. This began during her first travels in the early 1950s, writing articles about her experiences during. She continued after she returned to Switzerland, writing books and other texts based on her travels for children and adults.

This led to work as a journalist, which earned her opportunities for further travel to write and draw what she saw. From 1956 to 1958, she was on a long-term assignment in the Tonga Islands, where she met husband Freddy Drilhon, which whom she also collaborated professionally until his death in 1976.

She continued to write and illustrate periodicals and books for the rest of her life, which included fictional work as well. The latter mostly focused on alternative universes and utopian idea as well as stories based on the history of the Priory House.

Her fictional writing mostly focused on alternative universes and how to make the world better. During her career she depicted utopian worlds both in words and pictures with the aim of making a better reality. Her books describe her travels and adventures as well as the history of the Priory House.

In addition to her work with the building she also gave workshops on writing, printing, bookbinding and paper making.

Her work won recognitions such as the Kulturpreis des Kantons Solothurn (1975), Förderpreis Olten (1976), the Werkbeitrag der Goethe-Stiftung, Zürich (1976) and the Werkbeiträge von Bund, Kt.Solothurn, Stiftungen, Unternehmen 1972-1987.

== History of Cities project ==
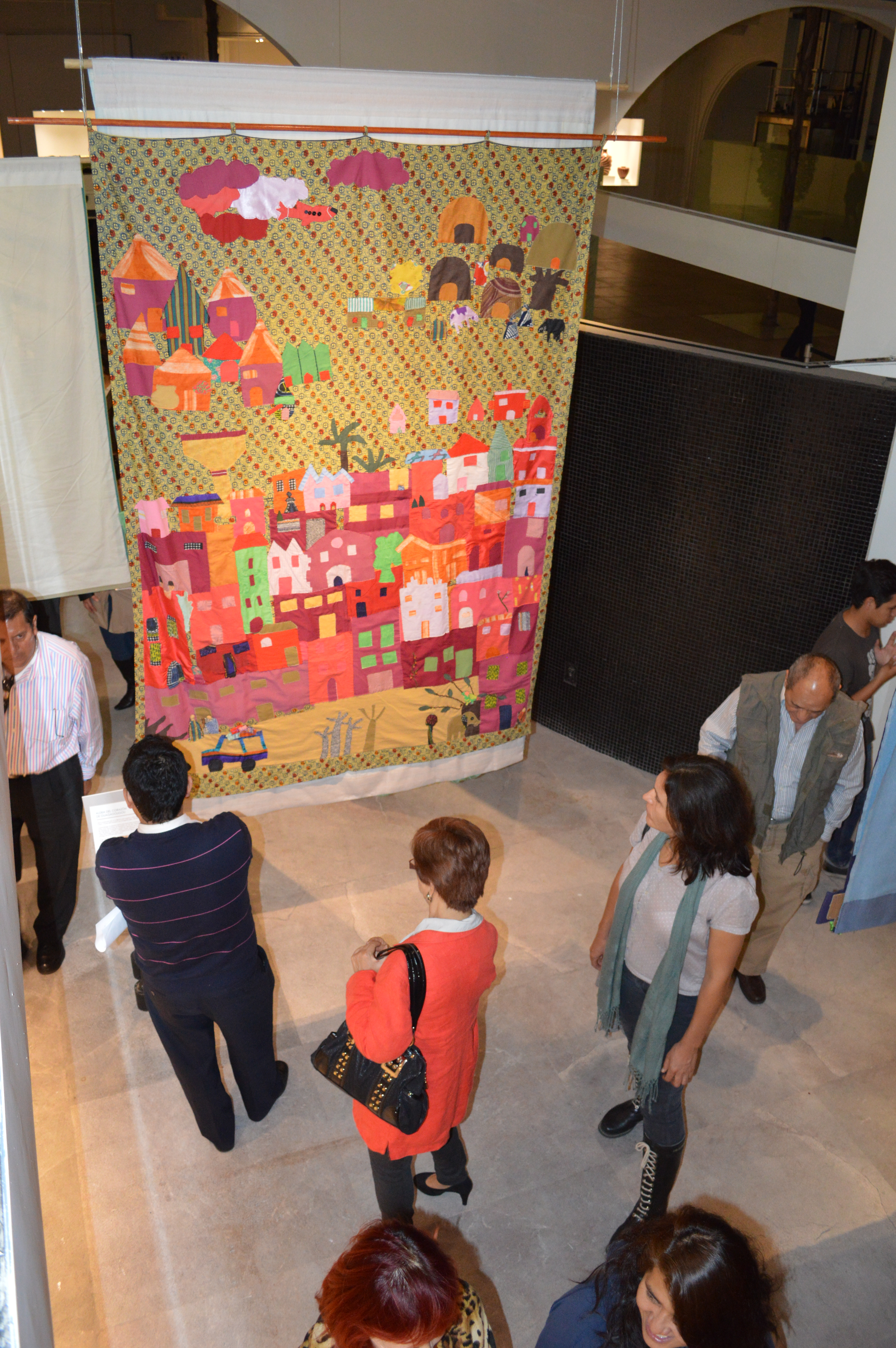
Exhibition of the project at the Museo de Arte Popular in 2014

Von Arx is quoted as saying that “everyone has their creative side, but often it is dormant.” One other of her lifetime projects is a collection of textile works called Histoires des villes (History of Cities). Her daughter states that she was terrified of the urban sprawl of the twentieth century although she admired the creativity of man and especially architecture. At age fifteen, she began the first piece, with a utopian image of her hometown. During her life, she invited others to participate, with the collection gaining pieces with images of various parts of the world such as New York, Mexico and the Middle East, all created by local hands. At the time of her death the collection contained twenty pieces, done in a variety of fabrics, a compilation that the Museo de Arte Popular in Mexico City calls “sui generis” unique in its composition and theme. In 2014, a tour of this collection was sponsored by the Swiss government to be shown in Mexico and other countries as the first event to honor Von Arx’s memory after her death.

== Published works ==
- Mein Luftschloss in Wolken: Die Fortsetzung von "Mein Luftschloss auf Erden" (1988)
- Als er noch da war: Roman (1983)
- Mein Luftschloss auf Erden (1981)
- Erweiterte Neuausgabe (1981)
- Mein Tagebuch zum "Luftschloss auf Erden": Auszuge(1982)
- Engel aus der Schreibmaschine (1979)
- Ich bin gern schuld an meinem Gluck: Satiren und Geschichten (1977)
- Mein Luftschloss auf Erden. Biographischer Roman (1975)
- Meine Inselabenteuer (1961)
- Inselabenteuer. Streifzüge durch die Inselwelt Australiens. Jugendbuch (1960)
- Nichts hat mich die Welt gekostet. Jugendbuch (1957)
- Nehmt mich bitte mit! Eine Weltreise per Anhalter (1956)
