= Arnex-sur-Orbe =

- Municipality
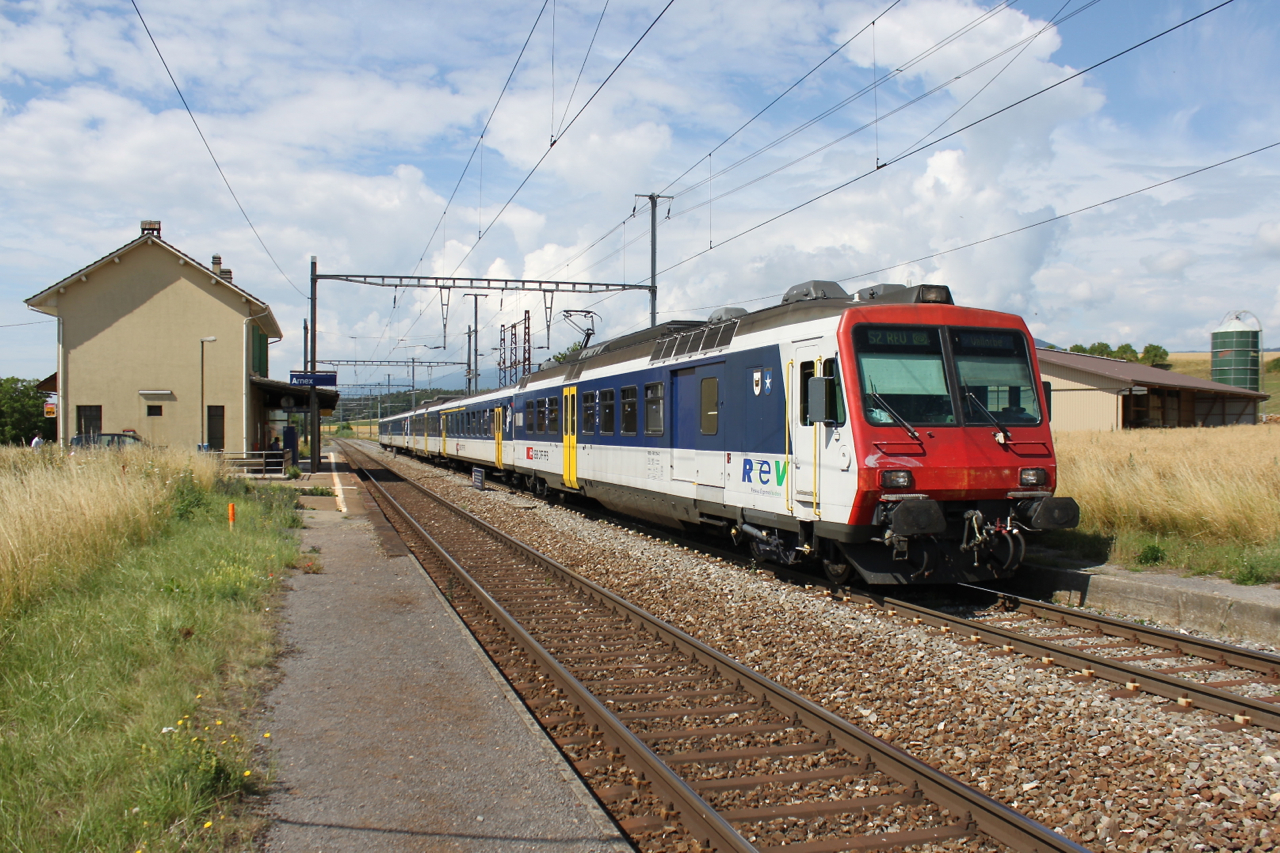

- Flag Coat of arms
- Location of Arnex-sur-Orbe
- Location within Switzerland Location within Canton of Vaud
- Coordinates: 46°42′N 6°31′E
- Country: Switzerland
- Canton: Vaud
- District: Jura-Nord Vaudois

Government
  - Mayor: Syndic

Area
  - Total: 7.62 km^{2} (2.94 sq mi)
- Elevation: 543 m (1,781 ft)

Population (2003)
  - Total: 540
  - Density: 71/km^{2} (180/sq mi)
- Time zone: UTC+01:00 (CET)
  - Summer (DST): UTC+02:00 (CEST)
- Postal code: 1321
- SFOS number: 5743
- ISO 3166 code: CH-VD
- Surrounded by: Agiez, Bavois, Bofflens, Chavornay, Croy, La Sarraz, Orbe, Pompaples
- Website: https://www.arnex-sur-orbe.ch Profile (in French), SFSO statistics

Arnex-sur-Orbe (French pronunciation: [aʁnɛ syʁ ɔʁb], literally Arnex on Orbe) is a municipality in the Swiss canton of Vaud, located in the district of Jura-Nord Vaudois.

== History ==
Arnex-sur-Orbe is first mentioned in 1049 as Arniacum.

== Geography ==
Arnex-sur-Orbe has an area, as of 2009, of 7.6 square kilometers (2.9 mi^{2}). Of this area, 5.6 km^{2} (2.2 mi^{2}) or 73.6% is used for agricultural purposes, while 1.48 km^{2} (0.57 mi^{2}) or 19.4% is forested. Of the rest of the land, 0.49 km^{2} (0.19 mi^{2}) or 6.4% is settled (buildings or roads), 0.04 km^{2} (9.9 acres) or 0.5% is either rivers or lakes and 0.02 km^{2} (4.9 acres) or 0.3% is unproductive land.

Of the built up area, housing and buildings made up 2.2% and transportation infrastructure made up 3.7%. Out of the forested land, 18.0% of the total land area is heavily forested and 1.4% is covered with orchards or small clusters of trees. Of the agricultural land, 60.2% is used for growing crops and 7.4% is pastures, while 6.0% is used for orchards or vine crops. All the water in the municipality is flowing water.

The municipality was part of the Orbe District until it was dissolved on 31 August 2006, and Arnex-sur-Orbe became part of the new district of Jura-Nord Vaudois.

The municipality is located above the western Orbe valley.

== Coat of arms ==
The blazon of the municipal coat of arms is Argent, a cross Sable, overall crossed in saltire a key and sword Gules.

== Demographics ==
Arnex-sur-Orbe has a population (as of December 2020) of 637. As of 2008, 8.8% of the population are resident foreign nationals. Over the last 10 years (1999–2009 ) the population has changed at a rate of 6%. It has changed at a rate of 1.3% due to migration and at a rate of 4.9% due to births and deaths.

Most of the population (as of 2000) speaks French (498 or 94.0%), with German being second most common (11 or 2.1%) and Portuguese being third (9 or 1.7%). There are 5 people who speak Italian.

The age distribution, as of 2009, in Arnex-sur-Orbe is; 67 children or 11.6% of the population are between 0 and 9 years old and 69 teenagers or 11.9% are between 10 and 19. Of the adult population, 64 people or 11.1% of the population are between 20 and 29 years old. 80 people or 13.8% are between 30 and 39, 77 people or 13.3% are between 40 and 49, and 94 people or 16.2% are between 50 and 59. The senior population distribution is 57 people or 9.8% of the population are between 60 and 69 years old, 47 people or 8.1% are between 70 and 79, there are 21 people or 3.6% who are between 80 and 89, and there are 3 people or 0.5% who are 90 and older.

As of 2000, there were 210 people who were single and never married in the municipality. There were 270 married individuals, 30 widows or widowers and 20 individuals who are divorced.

As of 2000, there were 212 private households in the municipality, and an average of 2.5 persons per household. There were 54 households that consist of only one person and 17 households with five or more people. Out of a total of 215 households that answered this question, 25.1% were households made up of just one person and there were 4 adults who lived with their parents. Of the rest of the households, there are 62 married couples without children, 75 married couples with children There were 12 single parents with a child or children. There were 5 households that were made up of unrelated people and 3 households that were made up of some sort of institution or another collective housing.

In 2000 there were 76 single family homes (or 50.3% of the total) out of a total of 151 inhabited buildings. There were 31 multi-family buildings (20.5%), along with 34 multi-purpose buildings that were mostly used for housing (22.5%) and 10 other use buildings (commercial or industrial) that also had some housing (6.6%).

In 2000, a total of 202 apartments (89.0% of the total) were permanently occupied, while 20 apartments (8.8%) were seasonally occupied and 5 apartments (2.2%) were empty. As of 2009, the construction rate of new housing units was 1.7 new units per 1000 residents. The vacancy rate for the municipality, in 2010, was 0%.

The historical population is given in the following chart:

== Sights ==
The entire village of Arnex-sur-Orbe is designated as part of the Inventory of Swiss Heritage Sites.

== Politics ==
In the 2007 federal election the most popular party was the SVP which received 26.38% of the vote. The next three most popular parties were the SP (25%), the FDP (18.25%) and the Green Party (10.21%). In the federal election, a total of 186 votes were cast, and the voter turnout was 44.1%.

== Economy ==
As of 2010, Arnex-sur-Orbe had an unemployment rate of 3.5%. As of 2008, there were 71 people employed in the primary economic sector and about 25 businesses involved in this sector. 22 people were employed in the secondary sector and there were 5 businesses in this sector. 30 people were employed in the tertiary sector, with 7 businesses in this sector. There were 281 residents of the municipality who were employed in some capacity, of which females made up 44.1% of the workforce.

In 2008 the total number of full-time equivalent jobs was 93. The number of jobs in the primary sector was 52, all of which were in agriculture. The number of jobs in the secondary sector was 20 of which 1 was in manufacturing and 19 (95.0%) were in construction. The number of jobs in the tertiary sector was 21. In the tertiary sector; 7 or 33.3% were in wholesale or retail sales or the repair of motor vehicles, 1 was in the movement and storage of goods, 7 or 33.3% were in a hotel or restaurant, 4 or 19.0% were in education.

In 2000, there were 22 workers who commuted into the municipality and 209 workers who commuted away. The municipality is a net exporter of workers, with about 9.5 workers leaving the municipality for every one entering. Of the working population, 13.9% used public transportation to get to work, and 67.3% used a private car.

== Religion ==
From the 2000 census, 77 or 14.5% were Roman Catholic, while 360 or 67.9% belonged to the Swiss Reformed Church. Of the rest of the population, there were 2 members of an Orthodox church (or about 0.38% of the population), and there were 21 individuals (or about 3.96% of the population) who belonged to another Christian church. There were 3 (or about 0.57% of the population) who were Islamic. 66 (or about 12.45% of the population) belonged to no church, are agnostic or atheist, and 11 individuals (or about 2.08% of the population) did not answer the question.

== Education ==
In Arnex-sur-Orbe about 192 or (36.2%) of the population have completed non-mandatory upper secondary education, and 55 or (10.4%) have completed additional higher education (either university or a Fachhochschule). Of the 55 who completed tertiary schooling, 63.6% were Swiss men, 27.3% were Swiss women.

In the 2009/2010 school year there were a total of 78 students in the Arnex-sur-Orbe school district. In the Vaud cantonal school system, two years of non-obligatory pre-school are provided by the political districts. During the school year, the political district provided pre-school care for a total of 578 children of which 359 children (62.1%) received subsidized pre-school care. The canton's primary school program requires students to attend for four years. There were 40 students in the municipal primary school program. The obligatory lower secondary school program lasts for six years and there were 38 students in those schools.

As of 2000, there were 32 students in Arnex-sur-Orbe who came from another municipality, while 59 residents attended schools outside the municipality.

== Transportation ==
The municipality has a railway station, Arnex, on the Simplon line. It has regular service to Vallorbe, Lausanne, and Aigle.
