= Croy, Switzerland =

Croy
- Municipality
- Flag Coat of arms
- Location of Croy
- Location within Switzerland Location within Canton of Vaud
- Coordinates: 46°42′N 06°29′E
- Country: Switzerland
- Canton: Vaud
- District: Jura-Nord Vaudois

Government
  - Mayor: Syndic

Area
  - Total: 4.49 km^{2} (1.73 sq mi)
- Elevation: 642 m (2,106 ft)

Population (2003)
  - Total: 301
  - Density: 67.0/km^{2} (174/sq mi)
- Time zone: UTC+01:00 (CET)
  - Summer (DST): UTC+02:00 (CEST)
- Postal code: 1322
- SFOS number: 5752
- ISO 3166 code: CH-VD
- Surrounded by: Arnex-sur-Orbe, Bofflens, Ferreyres, La Sarraz, Moiry, Romainmôtier-Envy
- Website: www.croy.ch

Croy is a municipality in the district of Jura-Nord Vaudois in the canton of Vaud in Switzerland.

== History ==
Croy is first mentioned in 1498 as Croy.

== Geography ==
Croy has an area, as of 2009, of 4.5 square kilometers (1.7 mi^{2}). Of this area, 2.03 km^{2} (0.78 mi^{2}) or 45.3% is used for agricultural purposes, while 2.17 km^{2} (0.84 mi^{2}) or 48.4% is forested. Of the rest of the land, 0.27 km^{2} (0.10 mi^{2}) or 6.0% is settled (buildings or roads), 0.01 km^{2} (2.5 acres) or 0.2% is either rivers or lakes.

Of the built up area, housing and buildings made up 2.5% and transportation infrastructure made up 2.5%. Out of the forested land, 46.9% of the total land area is heavily forested and 1.6% is covered with orchards or small clusters of trees. Of the agricultural land, 30.8% is used for growing crops and 14.3% is pastures. All the water in the municipality is flowing water.

The municipality was part of the Orbe District until it was dissolved on 31 August 2006, and Croy became part of the new district of Jura-Nord Vaudois.

The municipality is located on a plateau above the Nozon valley.

== Coat of arms ==
The blazon of the municipal coat of arms is Per pale Argent and Gules, a Saltire counterchanged.

== Demographics ==
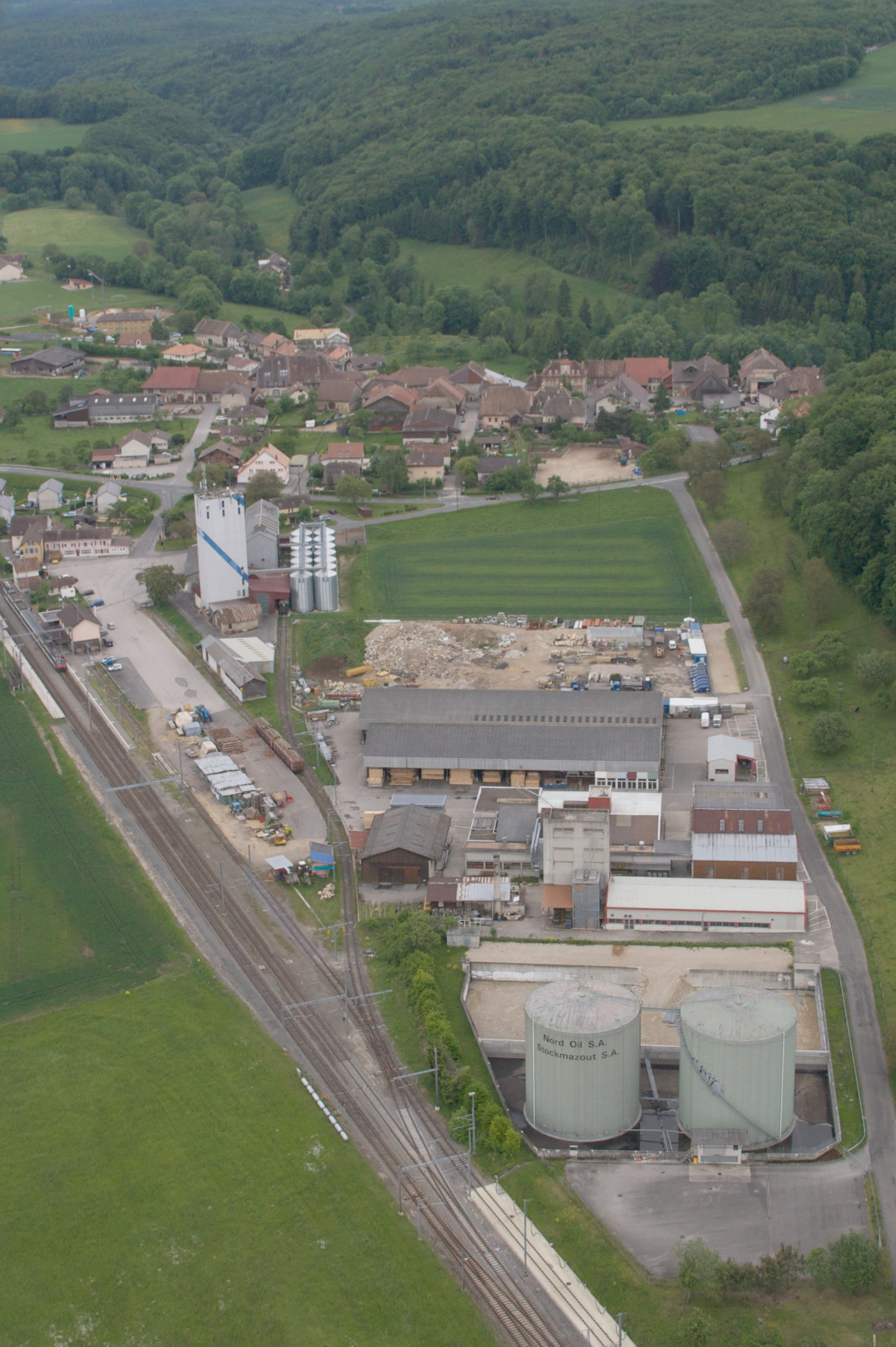
Aerial view of the Croy-Romainmôtier train station and sawmill

Croy has a population (as of December 2020) of 397. As of 2008, 9.8% of the population are resident foreign nationals. Over the last 10 years (1999–2009 ) the population has changed at a rate of 16.4%. It has changed at a rate of 15.6% due to migration and at a rate of 1.1% due to births and deaths.

Most of the population (as of 2000) speaks French (252 or 94.4%), with Portuguese being second most common (5 or 1.9%) and Italian being third (4 or 1.5%). There are 3 people who speak German and 1 person who speaks Romansh.

The age distribution, as of 2009, in Croy is; 33 children or 10.3% of the population are between 0 and 9 years old and 36 teenagers or 11.3% are between 10 and 19. Of the adult population, 28 people or 8.8% of the population are between 20 and 29 years old. 44 people or 13.8% are between 30 and 39, 43 people or 13.4% are between 40 and 49, and 38 people or 11.9% are between 50 and 59. The senior population distribution is 42 people or 13.1% of the population are between 60 and 69 years old, 29 people or 9.1% are between 70 and 79, there are 24 people or 7.5% who are between 80 and 89, and there are 3 people or 0.9% who are 90 and older.

As of 2000, there were 102 people who were single and never married in the municipality. There were 130 married individuals, 25 widows or widowers and 10 individuals who are divorced.

As of 2000, there were 117 private households in the municipality, and an average of 2.2 persons per household. There were 38 households that consist of only one person and 6 households with five or more people. Out of a total of 119 households that answered this question, 31.9% were households made up of just one person and there were 3 adults who lived with their parents. Of the rest of the households, there are 35 married couples without children, 26 married couples with children There were 14 single parents with a child or children. There was 1 household that was made up of unrelated people and 2 households that were made up of some sort of institution or another collective housing.

In 2000 there were 45 single family homes (or 54.2% of the total) out of a total of 83 inhabited buildings. There were 18 multi-family buildings (21.7%), along with 16 multi-purpose buildings that were mostly used for housing (19.3%) and 4 other use buildings (commercial or industrial) that also had some housing (4.8%).

In 2000, a total of 108 apartments (83.1% of the total) were permanently occupied, while 19 apartments (14.6%) were seasonally occupied and 3 apartments (2.3%) were empty. As of 2009, the construction rate of new housing units was 0 new units per 1000 residents. The vacancy rate for the municipality, in 2010, was 0%.

The historical population is given in the following chart:

== Politics ==
In the 2007 federal election the most popular party was the SP which received 23.3% of the vote. The next three most popular parties were the SVP (21.41%), the Green Party (16.65%) and the FDP (9.03%). In the federal election, a total of 107 votes were cast, and the voter turnout was 47.6%.

== Economy ==
As of 2010, Croy had an unemployment rate of 1.5%. As of 2008, there were 6 people employed in the primary economic sector and about 4 businesses involved in this sector. 23 people were employed in the secondary sector and there were 6 businesses in this sector. 10 people were employed in the tertiary sector, with 6 businesses in this sector. There were 128 residents of the municipality who were employed in some capacity, of which females made up 47.7% of the workforce.

In 2008 the total number of full-time equivalent jobs was 35. The number of jobs in the primary sector was 5, all of which were in agriculture. The number of jobs in the secondary sector was 22 of which 4 or (18.2%) were in manufacturing and 18 (81.8%) were in construction. The number of jobs in the tertiary sector was 8. In the tertiary sector; 2 or 25.0% were in wholesale or retail sales or the repair of motor vehicles, 3 or 37.5% were in a hotel or restaurant, 2 or 25.0% were technical professionals or scientists, 1 was in education.

In 2000, there were 28 workers who commuted into the municipality and 98 workers who commuted away. The municipality is a net exporter of workers, with about 3.5 workers leaving the municipality for every one entering. Of the working population, 18.8% used public transportation to get to work, and 59.4% used a private car.

== Religion ==
From the 2000 census, 44 or 16.5% were Roman Catholic, while 185 or 69.3% belonged to the Swiss Reformed Church. Of the rest of the population, there were 2 members of an Orthodox church (or about 0.75% of the population), and there were 4 individuals (or about 1.50% of the population) who belonged to another Christian church. There was 1 individual who was Islamic. There was 1 person who was Buddhist. 25 (or about 9.36% of the population) belonged to no church, are agnostic or atheist, and 7 individuals (or about 2.62% of the population) did not answer the question.

== Education ==
In Croy about 96 or (36.0%) of the population have completed non-mandatory upper secondary education, and 23 or (8.6%) have completed additional higher education (either university or a Fachhochschule). Of the 23 who completed tertiary schooling, 39.1% were Swiss men, 60.9% were Swiss women.

In the 2009/2010 school year there were a total of 45 students in the Croy school district. In the Vaud cantonal school system, two years of non-obligatory pre-school are provided by the political districts. During the school year, the political district provided pre-school care for a total of 578 children of which 359 children (62.1%) received subsidized pre-school care. The canton's primary school program requires students to attend for four years. There were 29 students in the municipal primary school program. The obligatory lower secondary school program lasts for six years and there were 13 students in those schools. There were also 3 students who were home schooled or attended another non-traditional school.

As of 2000, there were 16 students in Croy who came from another municipality, while 42 residents attended schools outside the municipality.

== Transportation ==
The municipality has a railway station, Croy-Romainmôtier, on the Simplon line. It has regular service to Vallorbe, Lausanne, and Aigle.
