= Bretonnières =

- Municipality
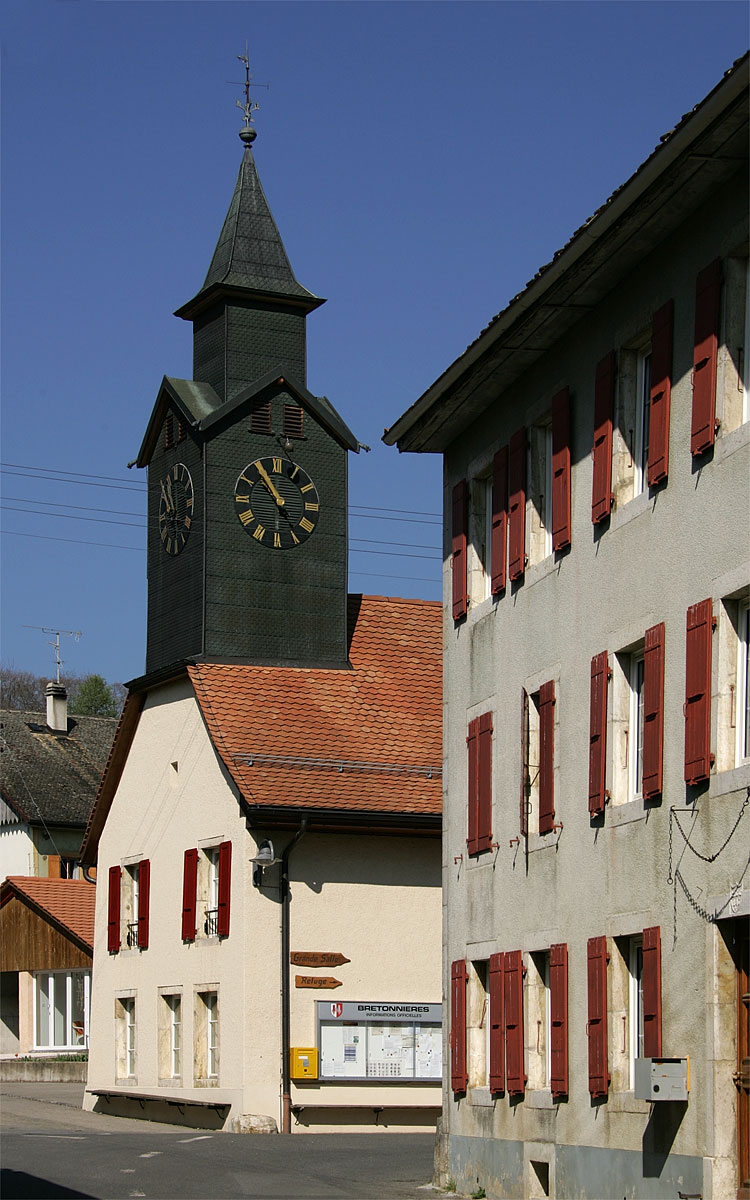
- Bretonnières village

- Flag Coat of arms
- Location of Bretonnières
- Location within Switzerland Location within Canton of Vaud
- Coordinates: 46°43′N 06°28′E
- Country: Switzerland
- Canton: Vaud
- District: Jura-Nord Vaudois

Government
  - Mayor: Syndic; M. François Berthoud

Area
  - Total: 5.46 km^{2} (2.11 sq mi)
- Elevation: 674 m (2,211 ft)

Population (2004)
  - Total: 225
  - Density: 41.2/km^{2} (107/sq mi)
- Demonym: Lè Caque-lentelye
- Time zone: UTC+01:00 (CET)
  - Summer (DST): UTC+02:00 (CEST)
- Postal code: 1329
- SFOS number: 5748
- ISO 3166 code: CH-VD
- Surrounded by: Les Clées, Agiez, Bofflens, Romainmôtier-Envy, Premier
- Website: http://www.1329.ch Profile (in French), SFSO statistics

Bretonnières is a municipality in the district of Jura-Nord Vaudois in the canton of Vaud in Switzerland.

== History ==
Bretonnières is first mentioned in 1154 as Bretoneres.

== Geography ==
Bretonnières has an area, as of 2009, of 5.5 square kilometers (2.1 mi^{2}). Of this area, 2.44 km^{2} (0.94 mi^{2}) or 44.8% is used for agricultural purposes, while 2.53 km^{2} (0.98 mi^{2}) or 46.4% is forested. Of the rest of the land, 0.5 km^{2} (0.19 mi^{2}) or 9.2% is settled (buildings or roads), 0.01 km^{2} (2.5 acres) or 0.2% is either rivers or lakes.

Of the built up area, housing and buildings made up 2.9% and transportation infrastructure made up 4.2%. Power and water infrastructure as well as other special developed areas made up 2.0% of the area Out of the forested land, 44.4% of the total land area is heavily forested and 2.0% is covered with orchards or small clusters of trees. Of the agricultural land, 27.2% is used for growing crops and 17.1% is pastures. All the water in the municipality is flowing water.

The municipality was part of the Orbe District until it was dissolved on 31 August 2006, and Bretonnières became part of the new district of Jura-Nord Vaudois.

The municipality is located at the foot of the Jura Mountains.

== Coat of arms ==
The blazon of the municipal coat of arms is Per pale Argent and Gules, two wheat stalks counterchanged.

== Demographics ==
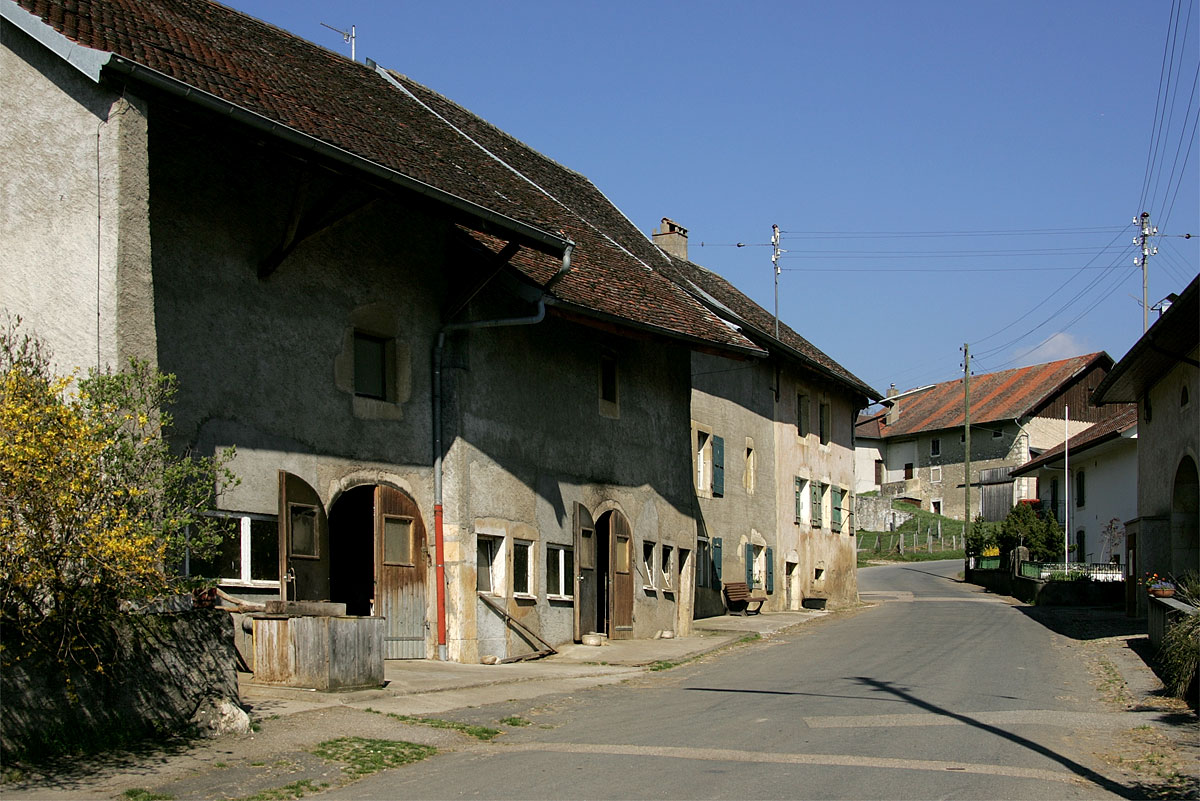
A street in Bretonnières

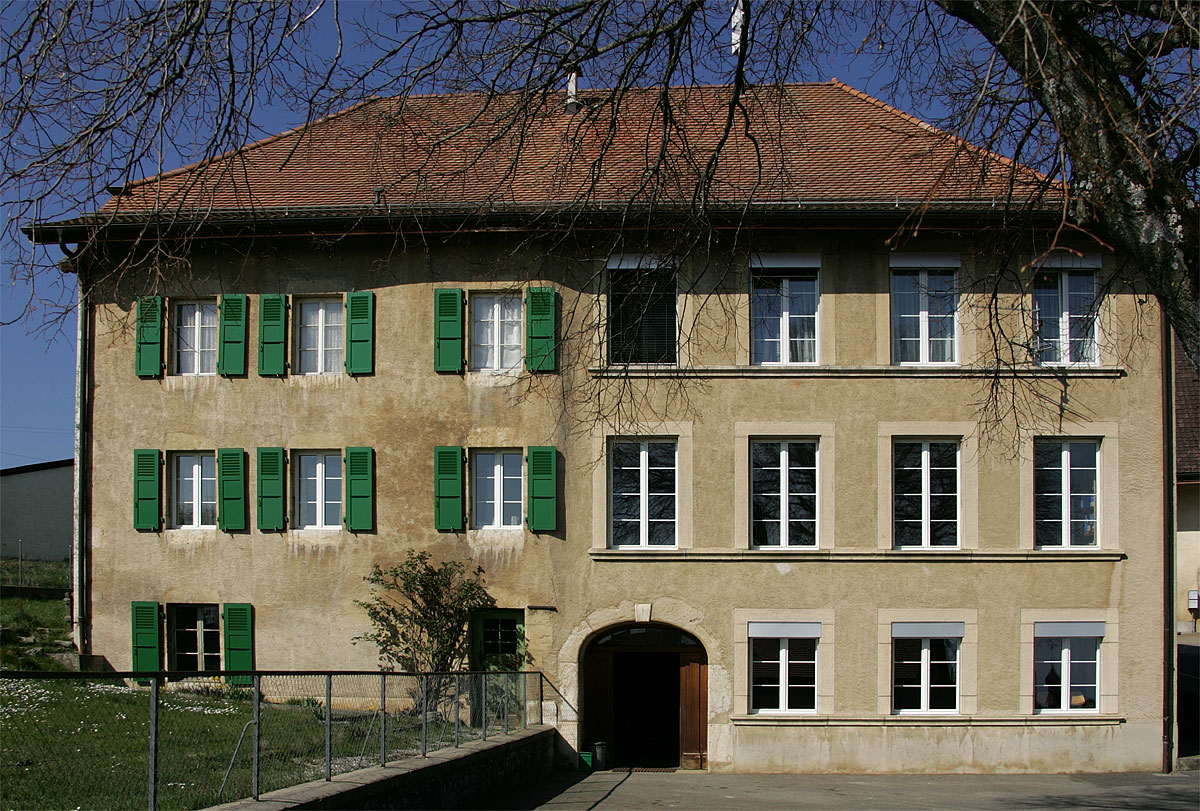
Municipal school house

Bretonnières has a population (as of December 2020) of 267. As of 2008, 3.9% of the population are resident foreign nationals. Over the last 10 years (1999–2009 ) the population has changed at a rate of -1.4%. It has changed at a rate of -1% due to migration and at a rate of -0.5% due to births and deaths.

Most of the population (as of 2000) speaks French (195 or 97.5%), with German being second most common (3 or 1.5%) and Italian being third (1 or 0.5%).

The age distribution, as of 2009, in Bretonnières is; 15 children or 7.4% of the population are between 0 and 9 years old and 25 teenagers or 12.3% are between 10 and 19. Of the adult population, 20 people or 9.8% of the population are between 20 and 29 years old. 22 people or 10.8% are between 30 and 39, 40 people or 19.6% are between 40 and 49, and 30 people or 14.7% are between 50 and 59. The senior population distribution is 28 people or 13.7% of the population are between 60 and 69 years old, 16 people or 7.8% are between 70 and 79, there are 8 people or 3.9% who are between 80 and 89.

As of 2000, there were 74 people who were single and never married in the municipality. There were 110 married individuals, 9 widows or widowers and 7 individuals who are divorced.

As of 2000, there were 80 private households in the municipality, and an average of 2.5 persons per household. There were 21 households that consist of only one person and 9 households with five or more people. Out of a total of 81 households that answered this question, 25.9% were households made up of just one person. Of the rest of the households, there are 26 married couples without children, 31 married couples with children There were 2 households that were made up of unrelated people and 1 household that was made up of some sort of institution or another collective housing.

In 2000 there were 48 single family homes (or 66.7% of the total) out of a total of 72 inhabited buildings. There were 10 multi-family buildings (13.9%), along with 11 multi-purpose buildings that were mostly used for housing (15.3%) and 3 other use buildings (commercial or industrial) that also had some housing (4.2%).

In 2000, a total of 75 apartments (82.4% of the total) were permanently occupied, while 13 apartments (14.3%) were seasonally occupied and 3 apartments (3.3%) were empty. As of 2009, the construction rate of new housing units was 0 new units per 1000 residents. The vacancy rate for the municipality, in 2010, was 0%.

The historical population is given in the following chart:

== Politics ==
In the 2007 federal election the most popular party was the SVP which received 26.87% of the vote. The next three most popular parties were the SP (22.12%), the FDP (15.29%) and the Green Party (11.91%). In the federal election, a total of 86 votes were cast, and the voter turnout was 52.8%.

== Economy ==
As of 2010, Bretonnières had an unemployment rate of 3%. As of 2008, there were 27 people employed in the primary economic sector and about 10 businesses involved in this sector. 4 people were employed in the secondary sector and there were 2 businesses in this sector. 6 people were employed in the tertiary sector, with 2 businesses in this sector. There were 97 residents of the municipality who were employed in some capacity, of which females made up 38.1% of the workforce.

In 2008 the total number of full-time equivalent jobs was 23. The number of jobs in the primary sector was 16, all of which were in agriculture. The number of jobs in the secondary sector was 3 of which or (0.0%) were in manufacturing, 2 or (66.7%) were in mining and 1 was in construction. The number of jobs in the tertiary sector was 4. In the tertiary sector; 3 or 75.0% were in a hotel or restaurant, 1 was in education.

In 2000, there were 7 workers who commuted into the municipality and 71 workers who commuted away. The municipality is a net exporter of workers, with about 10.1 workers leaving the municipality for every one entering. Of the working population, 15.5% used public transportation to get to work, and 60.8% used a private car.

== Religion ==
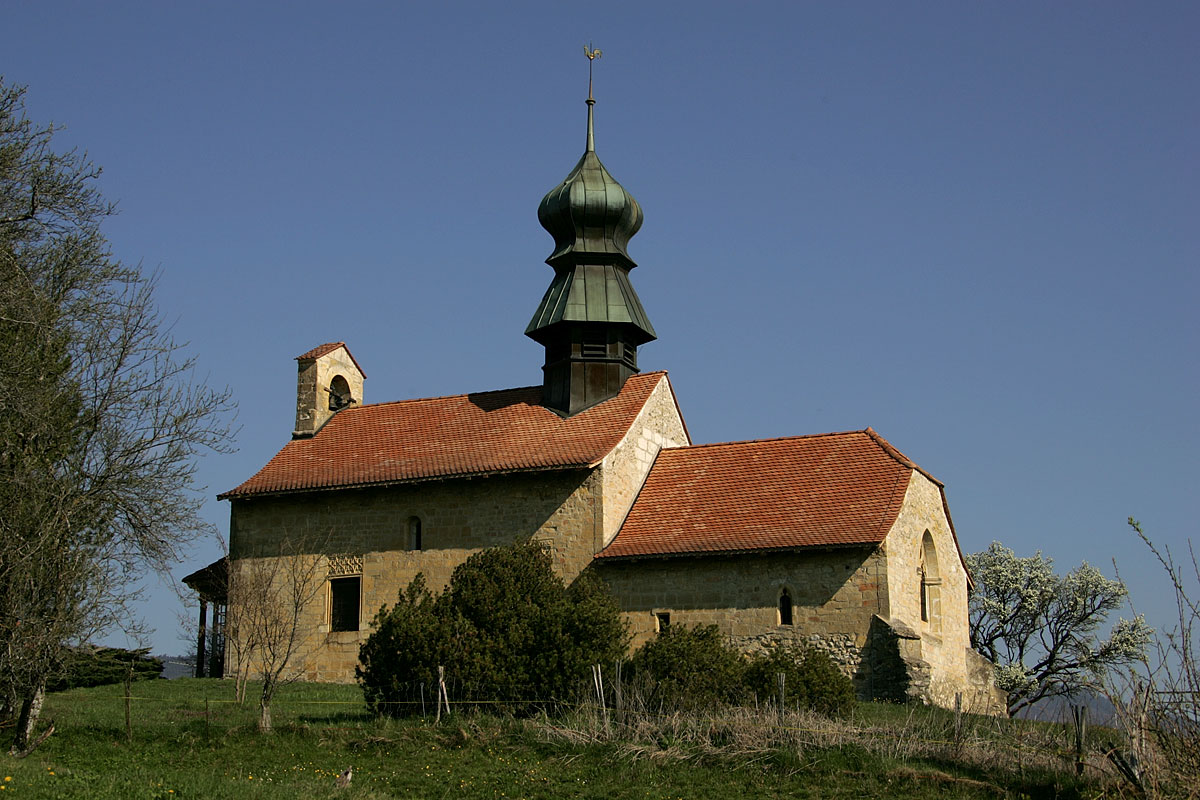
Bretonnières church

From the 2000 census, 25 or 12.5% were Roman Catholic, while 122 or 61.0% belonged to the Swiss Reformed Church. Of the rest of the population, there were 34 individuals (or about 17.00% of the population) who belonged to another Christian church. 33 (or about 16.50% of the population) belonged to no church, are agnostic or atheist, and 3 individuals (or about 1.50% of the population) did not answer the question.

== Education ==
In Bretonnières about 81 or (40.5%) of the population have completed non-mandatory upper secondary education, and 24 or (12.0%) have completed additional higher education (either university or a Fachhochschule). Of the 24 who completed tertiary schooling, 58.3% were Swiss men, 29.2% were Swiss women.

In the 2009/2010 school year there were a total of 18 students in the Bretonnières school district. In the Vaud cantonal school system, two years of non-obligatory pre-school are provided by the political districts. During the school year, the political district provided pre-school care for a total of 578 children of which 359 children (62.1%) received subsidized pre-school care. The canton's primary school program requires students to attend for four years. There were 8 students in the municipal primary school program. The obligatory lower secondary school program lasts for six years and there were 10 students in those schools.

As of 2000, there were 10 students in Bretonnières who came from another municipality, while 28 residents attended schools outside the municipality.

== Transportation ==
The municipality has a railway station, Bretonnières, on the Simplon line. It has regular service to Vallorbe, Lausanne, and Aigle.
