= Arnex railway station =

Railway station in Arnex-sur-Orbe, Switzerland

Arnex
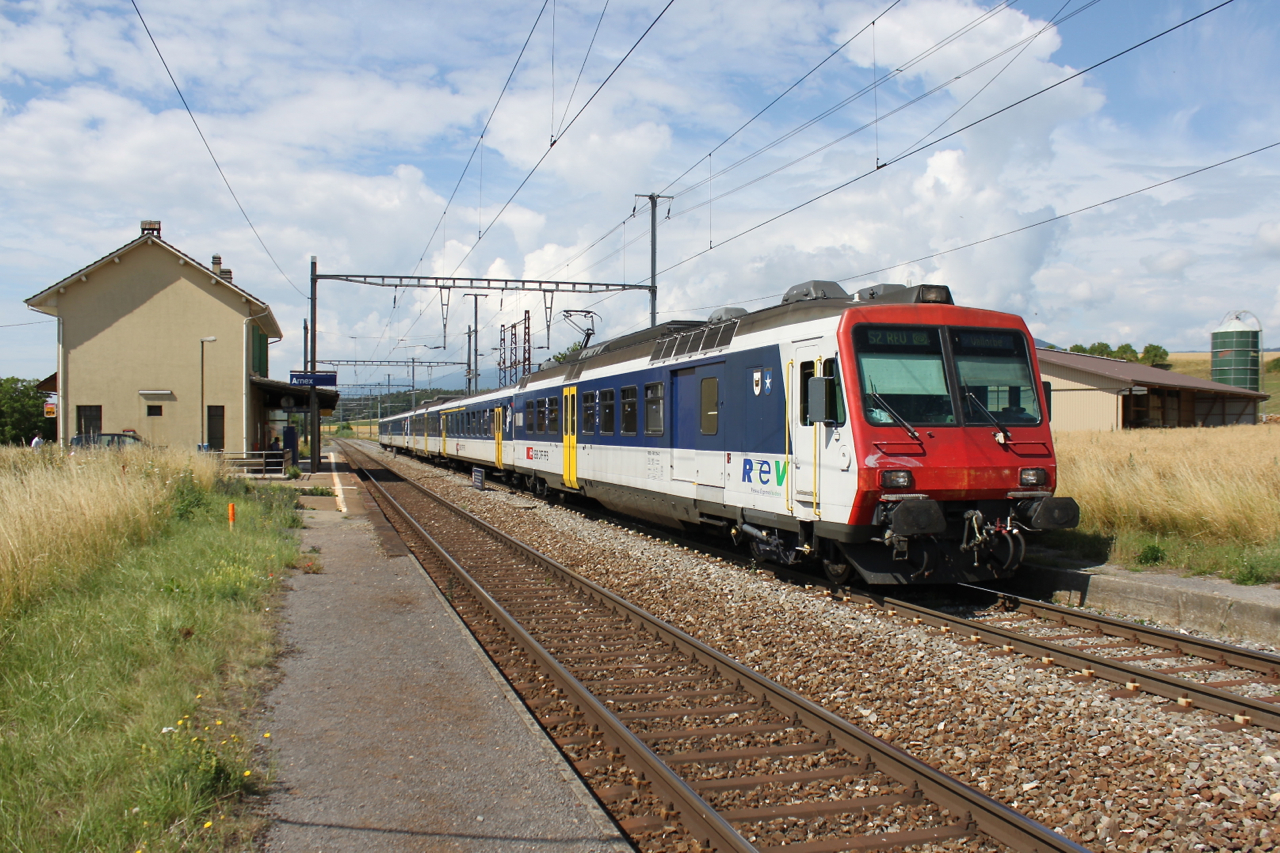
- SBB-CFF-FFS RBDe 560 passes the station in 2009

General information
- Location: Arnex-sur-Orbe; Switzerland
- Coordinates: 46°41′53″N 6°31′08″E
- Elevation: 552 m (1,811 ft)
- Owner: Swiss Federal Railways
- Line: Simplon line
- Distance: 27.6 km (17.1 mi) from Lausanne
- Platforms: 2 side platforms
- Tracks: 2
- Train operators: Swiss Federal Railways
- Connections: CarPostal SA buses; Travys bus line

Construction
- Parking: Yes (21 spaces)
- Cycle facilities: Yes (12 spaces)
- Accessible: Partly

Other information
- Station code: 8501107 (AX)
- Fare zone: 113 (mobilis)

Passengers
- 2023: 520 per weekday (SBB)

Services
Preceding station	RER Vaud	Following station
Croy-Romainmôtier towards Vallorbe	R3	La Sarraz towards Vevey
Croy-Romainmôtier towards Le Brassus or Vallorbe	R4	La Sarraz towards Vevey
Location

Arnex railway station (French: Gare d'Arnex) is a railway station in the municipality of Arnex-sur-Orbe, in the Swiss canton of Vaud. It is an intermediate stop on the standard gauge Simplon line of Swiss Federal Railways.

== Services ==
As of the December 2024 timetable change, the following services stop at Arnex:

- RER Vaud R3 / R4: half-hourly (hourly on weekends) service between Vallorbe and Bex; hourly service to Le Brassus; limited service from Bex to St-Maurice.
