= Agiez =

- Municipality
- Flag Coat of arms
- Location of Agiez
- Location within Switzerland Location within Canton of Vaud
- Coordinates: 46°43′N 06°30′E
- Country: Switzerland
- Canton: Vaud
- District: Jura-Nord Vaudois

Government
  - Mayor: Syndic

Area
  - Total: 5.47 km^{2} (2.11 sq mi)
- Elevation: 526 m (1,726 ft)

Population (2003)
  - Total: 235
  - Density: 43.0/km^{2} (111/sq mi)
- Time zone: UTC+01:00 (CET)
  - Summer (DST): UTC+02:00 (CEST)
- Postal code: 1352
- SFOS number: 5742
- ISO 3166 code: CH-VD
- Surrounded by: Arnex-sur-Orbe, Bofflens, Bretonnières, Les Clées, Montcherand, Orbe
- Website: https://agiez.ch Profile (in French), SFSO statistics

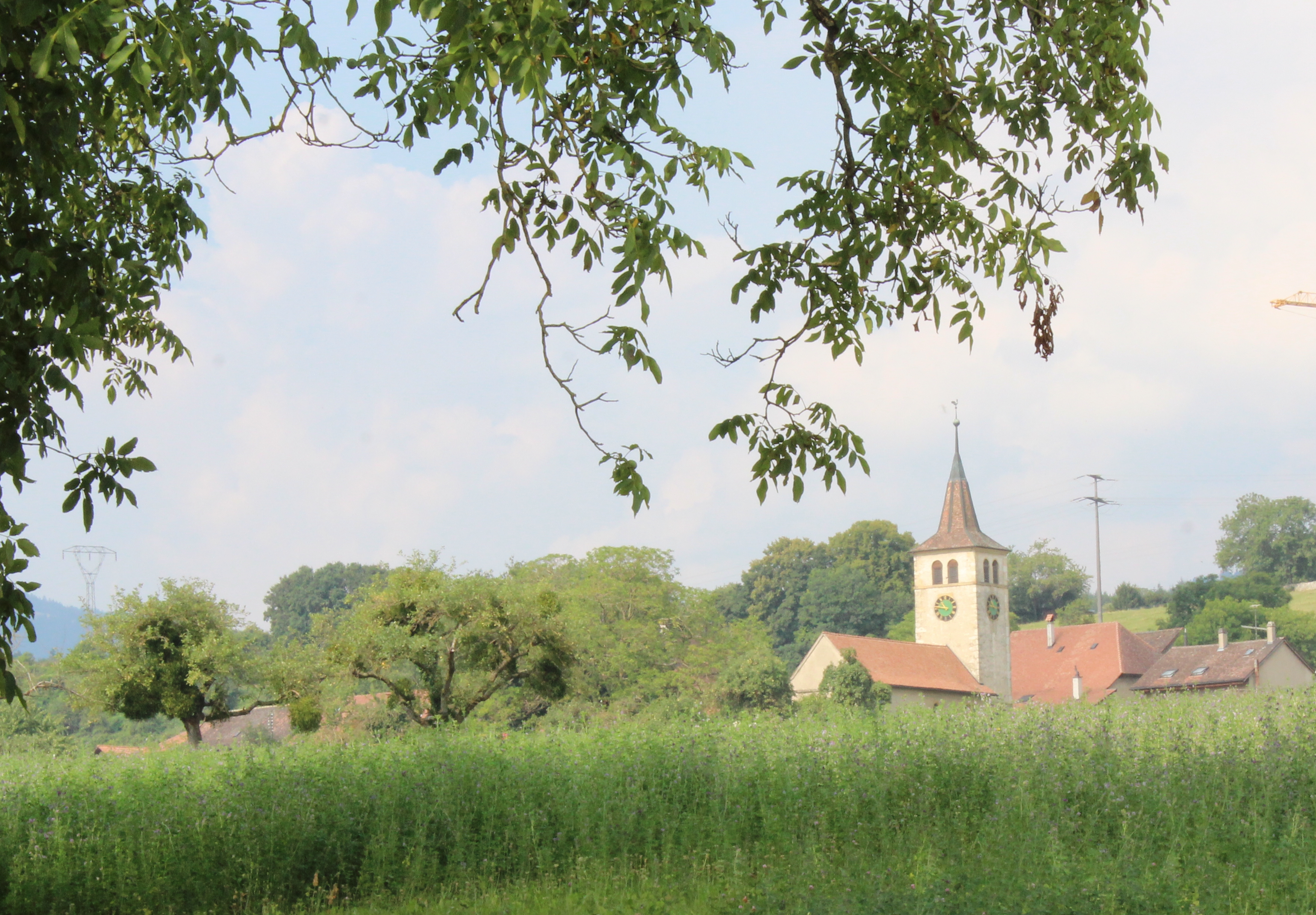
Agiez

Agiez is a municipality of the district of Jura-Nord Vaudois in the canton of Vaud in Switzerland.

== History ==
Agiez is first mentioned in 1011 as in Aziaco.

== Geography ==
Agiez has an area, as of 2009, of 5.5 square kilometers (2.1 mi^{2}). Of this area, 3.46 km^{2} (1.34 mi^{2}) or 63.3% is used for agricultural purposes, while 1.72 km^{2} (0.66 mi^{2}) or 31.4% is forested. Of the rest of the land, 0.24 km^{2} (0.093 mi^{2}) or 4.4% is settled (buildings or roads), 0.03 km^{2} (7.4 acres) or 0.5% is either rivers or lakes and 0.02 km^{2} (4.9 acres) or 0.4% is unproductive land.

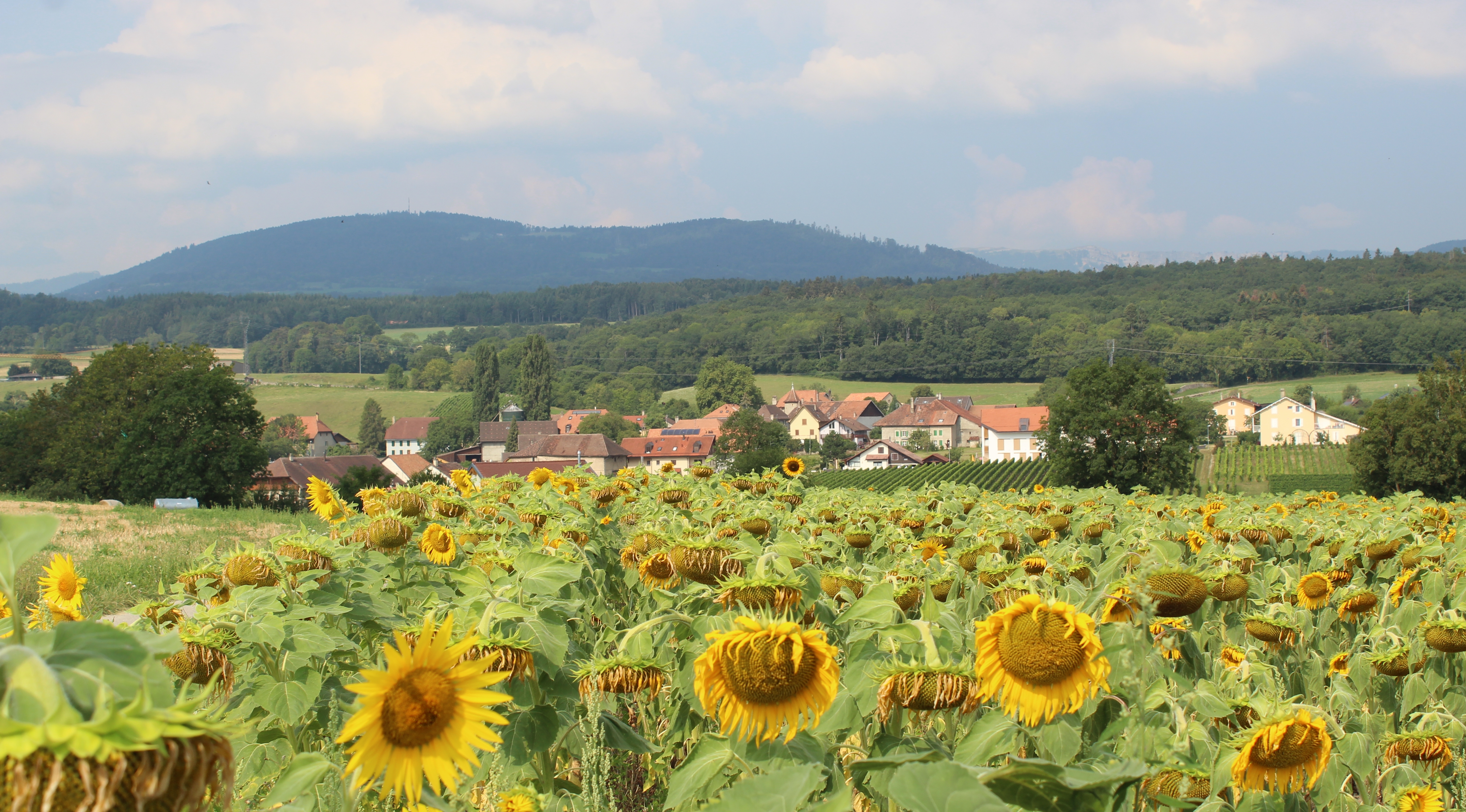
Agiez

Of the built up area, housing and buildings made up 1.8% and transportation infrastructure made up 2.4%. Out of the forested land, all of the forested land area is covered with heavy forests. Of the agricultural land, 51.0% is used for growing crops and 10.6% is pastures, while 1.6% is used for orchards or vine crops. All the water in the municipality is flowing water.

The municipality was part of the Orbe District until it was dissolved on 31 August 2006, and Agiez became part of the new district of Jura-Nord Vaudois.

The municipality is located on a plateau above the banks of the Orbe river.

== Coat of arms ==
The blazon of the municipal coat of arms is Per pale Argent and Gules, two crossed pikes counterchanged.

== Demographics ==
Agiez has a population (as of December 2020) of 376. As of 2008, 13.7% of the population are resident foreign nationals. Over the last 10 years (1999–2009 ) the population has changed at a rate of 12.5%. It has changed at a rate of 14.3% due to migration and at a rate of -2.2% due to births and deaths.

Most of the population (as of 2000) speaks French (216 or 96.4%), with Portuguese being second most common (4 or 1.8%) and German being third (2 or 0.9%).

The age distribution, as of 2009, in Agiez is; 37 children or 14.7% of the population are between 0 and 9 years old and 33 teenagers or 13.1% are between 10 and 19. Of the adult population, 14 people or 5.6% of the population are between 20 and 29 years old. 44 people or 17.5% are between 30 and 39, 32 people or 12.7% are between 40 and 49, and 31 people or 12.4% are between 50 and 59. The senior population distribution is 34 people or 13.5% of the population are between 60 and 69 years old, 17 people or 6.8% are between 70 and 79, there are 5 people or 2.0% who are between 80 and 89, and there are 4 people or 1.6% who are 90 and older.

As of 2000, there were 88 people who were single and never married in the municipality. There were 108 married individuals, 13 widows or widowers and 15 individuals who are divorced.

As of 2000, there were 98 private households in the municipality, and an average of 2.3 persons per household. There were 31 households that consist of only one person and 7 households with five or more people. Out of a total of 100 households that answered this question, 31.0% were households made up of just one person and there was 1 adult who lived with their parents. Of the rest of the households, there are 34 married couples without children, 27 married couples with children There were 4 single parents with a child or children. There was 1 household that was made up of unrelated people and 2 households that were made up of some sort of institution or another collective housing.

In 2000 there were 43 single family homes (or 55.8% of the total) out of a total of 77 inhabited buildings. There were 10 multi-family buildings (13.0%), along with 21 multi-purpose buildings that were mostly used for housing (27.3%) and 3 other use buildings (commercial or industrial) that also had some housing (3.9%).

In 2000, a total of 94 apartments (87.0% of the total) were permanently occupied, while 7 apartments (6.5%) were seasonally occupied and 7 apartments (6.5%) were empty. As of 2009, the construction rate of new housing units was 0 new units per 1000 residents. The vacancy rate for the municipality, in 2010, was 6.19%.

The historical population is given in the following chart:

== Sights ==
The entire village of Agiez is designated as part of the Inventory of Swiss Heritage Sites.

== Politics ==
In the 2007 federal election the most popular party was the SVP which received 41.8% of the vote. The next three most popular parties were the SP (13.89%), the Green Party (10.84%) and the FDP (10.03%). In the federal election, a total of 85 votes were cast, and the voter turnout was 52.1%.

== Economy ==
As of 2010, Agiez had an unemployment rate of 4.2%. As of 2008, there were 32 people employed in the primary economic sector and about 13 businesses involved in this sector. 25 people were employed in the secondary sector and there were 3 businesses in this sector. 9 people were employed in the tertiary sector, with 5 businesses in this sector. There were 106 residents of the municipality who were employed in some capacity, of which females made up 44.3% of the workforce.

In 2008 the total number of full-time equivalent jobs was 52. The number of jobs in the primary sector was 21, all of which were in agriculture. The number of jobs in the secondary sector was 24 of which 3 or (12.5%) were in manufacturing and 21 (87.5%) were in construction. The number of jobs in the tertiary sector was 7. In the tertiary sector; 1 was in the sale or repair of motor vehicles, 3 or 42.9% were in a hotel or restaurant, 1 was a technical professional or scientist, 2 or 28.6% were in education.

In 2000, there were 11 workers who commuted into the municipality and 64 workers who commuted away. The municipality is a net exporter of workers, with about 5.8 workers leaving the municipality for every one entering. Of the working population, 5.7% used public transportation to get to work, and 54.7% used a private car.

== Religion ==
From the 2000 census, 32 or 14.3% were Roman Catholic, while 142 or 63.4% belonged to the Swiss Reformed Church. Of the rest of the population, there was 1 member of an Orthodox church, and there were 6 individuals (or about 2.68% of the population) who belonged to another Christian church. There were 2 individuals (or about 0.89% of the population) who were Jewish, and 32 (or about 14.29% of the population) belonged to no church, are agnostic or atheist, and 12 individuals (or about 5.36% of the population) did not answer the question.

== Education ==
In Agiez about 88 or (39.3%) of the population have completed non-mandatory upper secondary education, and 23 or (10.3%) have completed additional higher education (either university or a Fachhochschule). Of the 23 who completed tertiary schooling, 65.2% were Swiss men, 30.4% were Swiss women.

In the 2009/2010 school year there were a total of 36 students in the Agiez school district. In the Vaud cantonal school system, two years of non-obligatory pre-school are provided by the political districts. During the school year, the political district provided pre-school care for a total of 578 children of which 359 children (62.1%) received subsidized pre-school care. The canton's primary school program requires students to attend for four years. There were 22 students in the municipal primary school program. The obligatory lower secondary school program lasts for six years and there were 14 students in those schools.

As of 2000, there were 15 students in Agiez who came from another municipality, while 34 residents attended schools outside the municipality.

== See also ==
- Agassiz family
