= Vaulion =

- Municipality
- Flag Coat of arms
- Location of Vaulion
- Location within Switzerland Location within Canton of Vaud
- Coordinates: 46°41′N 06°23′E
- Country: Switzerland
- Canton: Vaud
- District: Jura-Nord Vaudois

Government
  - Mayor: Syndic; Claude Languetin

Area
  - Total: 13.18 km^{2} (5.09 sq mi)
- Elevation: 933 m (3,061 ft)

Population (2004)
  - Total: 450
  - Density: 34/km^{2} (88/sq mi)
- Demonym(s): Les Vaulienis; Lè Foueta-Lîvra
- Time zone: UTC+01:00 (CET)
  - Summer (DST): UTC+02:00 (CEST)
- Postal code: 1325
- SFOS number: 5765
- ISO 3166 code: CH-VD
- Surrounded by: Vallorbe, Premier, Romainmôtier-Envy, Juriens, Mont-la-Ville, L'Abbaye
- Website: www.vaulion.ch

Vaulion (French pronunciation: [voljɔ̃]) is a municipality in the district of Jura-Nord Vaudois in the canton of Vaud in Switzerland.

== History ==
Vaulion is first mentioned in 1097 as Vallis Leonis. In 1160 it was mentioned as Valleuni and in 1316 as Vaulion.

== Geography ==
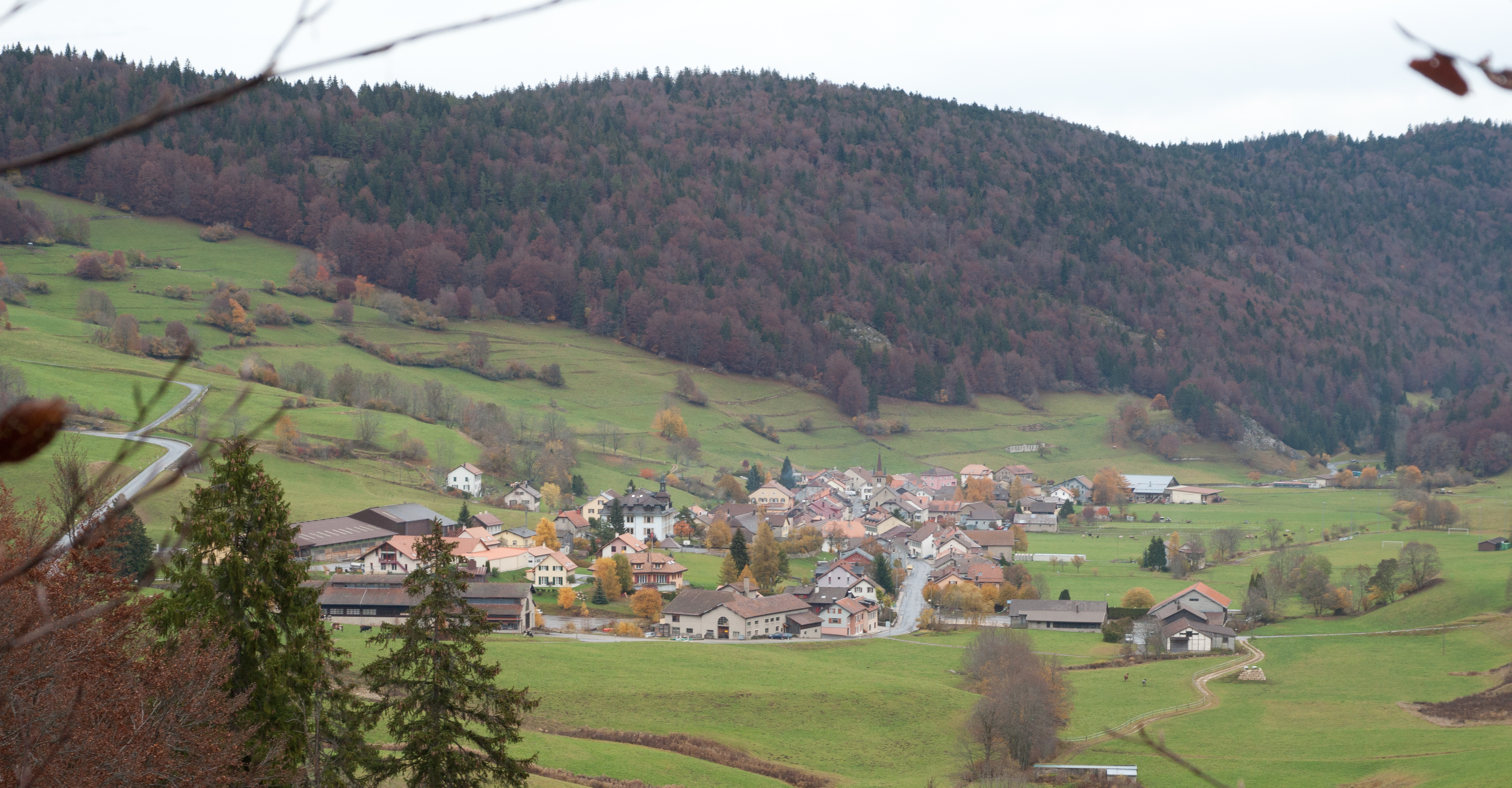
Vaulion, Switzerland

Vaulion has an area, as of 2009, of 13.2 square kilometers (5.1 mi^{2}). Of this area, 6.36 km^{2} (2.46 mi^{2}) or 48.3% is used for agricultural purposes, while 6.39 km^{2} (2.47 mi^{2}) or 48.5% is forested. Of the rest of the land, 0.42 km^{2} (0.16 mi^{2}) or 3.2% is settled (buildings or roads), 0.03 km^{2} (7.4 acres) or 0.2% is either rivers or lakes and 0.02 km^{2} (4.9 acres) or 0.2% is unproductive land.

Of the built up area, housing and buildings made up 1.4% and transportation infrastructure made up 1.6%. Out of the forested land, 44.3% of the total land area is heavily forested and 4.2% is covered with orchards or small clusters of trees. Of the agricultural land, 0.1% is used for growing crops and 27.4% is pastures and 20.6% is used for alpine pastures. All the water in the municipality is flowing water.

The municipality was part of the Orbe District until it was dissolved on 31 August 2006, and Vaulion became part of the new district of Jura-Nord Vaudois.

The municipality is located near the Nozon.

== Coat of arms ==
The blazon of the municipal coat of arms is Argent, a letter V Gules, in chief three Harts Vert, Gules and Or radiating..

== Demographics ==
Vaulion has a population (as of December 2020) of 505. As of 2008, 7.0% of the population are resident foreign nationals. Over the last 10 years (1999–2009 ) the population has changed at a rate of -0.4%. It has changed at a rate of 2.2% due to migration and at a rate of -2.2% due to births and deaths.

Most of the population (as of 2000) speaks French (405 or 92.7%), with German being second most common (16 or 3.7%) and Portuguese being third (6 or 1.4%). There are 2 people who speak Italian.

The age distribution, as of 2009, in Vaulion is; 43 children or 9.6% of the population are between 0 and 9 years old and 53 teenagers or 11.9% are between 10 and 19. Of the adult population, 69 people or 15.4% of the population are between 20 and 29 years old. 46 people or 10.3% are between 30 and 39, 58 people or 13.0% are between 40 and 49, and 77 people or 17.2% are between 50 and 59. The senior population distribution is 43 people or 9.6% of the population are between 60 and 69 years old, 39 people or 8.7% are between 70 and 79, there are 18 people or 4.0% who are between 80 and 89, and there is 1 person who is 90 and older.

As of 2000, there were 169 people who were single and never married in the municipality. There were 203 married individuals, 37 widows or widowers and 28 individuals who are divorced.

As of 2000, there were 191 private households in the municipality, and an average of 2.3 persons per household. There were 71 households that consist of only one person and 17 households with five or more people. Out of a total of 194 households that answered this question, 36.6% were households made up of just one person and there were 2 adults who lived with their parents. Of the rest of the households, there are 49 married couples without children, 50 married couples with children There were 16 single parents with a child or children. There were 3 households that were made up of unrelated people and 3 households that were made up of some sort of institution or another collective housing.

In 2000 there were 74 single family homes (or 42.5% of the total) out of a total of 174 inhabited buildings. There were 40 multi-family buildings (23.0%), along with 43 multi-purpose buildings that were mostly used for housing (24.7%) and 17 other use buildings (commercial or industrial) that also had some housing (9.8%). In 2000, a total of 181 apartments (69.3% of the total) were permanently occupied, while 55 apartments (21.1%) were seasonally occupied and 25 apartments (9.6%) were empty. As of 2009, the construction rate of new housing units was 2.2 new units per 1000 residents. The vacancy rate for the municipality, in 2010, was 4.1%.

The historical population is given in the following chart:

== Sights ==
The entire urban village of Vaulion is designated as part of the Inventory of Swiss Heritage Sites.

== Politics ==
In the 2007 federal election the most popular party was the SVP which received 27.09% of the vote. The next three most popular parties were the SP (24.05%), the FDP (16.23%) and the Green Party (10.23%). In the federal election, a total of 174 votes were cast, and the voter turnout was 50.3%.

== Economy ==
As of 2010, Vaulion had an unemployment rate of 3.8%. As of 2008, there were 51 people employed in the primary economic sector and about 11 businesses involved in this sector. 34 people were employed in the secondary sector and there were 7 businesses in this sector. 28 people were employed in the tertiary sector, with 10 businesses in this sector. There were 220 residents of the municipality who were employed in some capacity, of which females made up 42.3% of the workforce.

In 2008 the total number of full-time equivalent jobs was 96. The number of jobs in the primary sector was 45, of which 21 were in agriculture and 23 were in forestry or lumber production. The number of jobs in the secondary sector was 31 of which 27 or (87.1%) were in manufacturing and 4 (12.9%) were in construction. The number of jobs in the tertiary sector was 20. In the tertiary sector; 7 or 35.0% were in wholesale or retail sales or the repair of motor vehicles, 2 or 10.0% were in the movement and storage of goods, 9 or 45.0% were in a hotel or restaurant.

In 2000, there were 70 workers who commuted into the municipality and 122 workers who commuted away. The municipality is a net exporter of workers, with about 1.7 workers leaving the municipality for every one entering. About 25.7% of the workforce coming into Vaulion are coming from outside Switzerland. Of the working population, 7.3% used public transportation to get to work, and 56.4% used a private car.

== Religion ==
From the 2000 census, 60 or 13.7% were Roman Catholic, while 289 or 66.1% belonged to the Swiss Reformed Church. Of the rest of the population, there were 24 individuals (or about 5.49% of the population) who belonged to another Christian church. There were 6 (or about 1.37% of the population) who were Islamic. There was 1 person who was Buddhist and 1 individual who belonged to another church. 59 (or about 13.50% of the population) belonged to no church, are agnostic or atheist, and 7 individuals (or about 1.60% of the population) did not answer the question.

== Education ==
In Vaulion about 155 or (35.5%) of the population have completed non-mandatory upper secondary education, and 38 or (8.7%) have completed additional higher education (either university or a Fachhochschule). Of the 38 who completed tertiary schooling, 68.4% were Swiss men, 23.7% were Swiss women.

In the 2009/2010 school year there were a total of 45 students in the Vaulion school district. In the Vaud cantonal school system, two years of non-obligatory pre-school are provided by the political districts. During the school year, the political district provided pre-school care for a total of 578 children of which 359 children (62.1%) received subsidized pre-school care. The canton's primary school program requires students to attend for four years. There were 23 students in the municipal primary school program. The obligatory lower secondary school program lasts for six years and there were 21 students in those schools. There was also 1 student who was home schooled or attended another non-traditional school.

As of 2000, there were 95 students in Vaulion who came from another municipality, while 50 residents attended schools outside the municipality.
