= Premier, Switzerland =

Premier
- Municipality
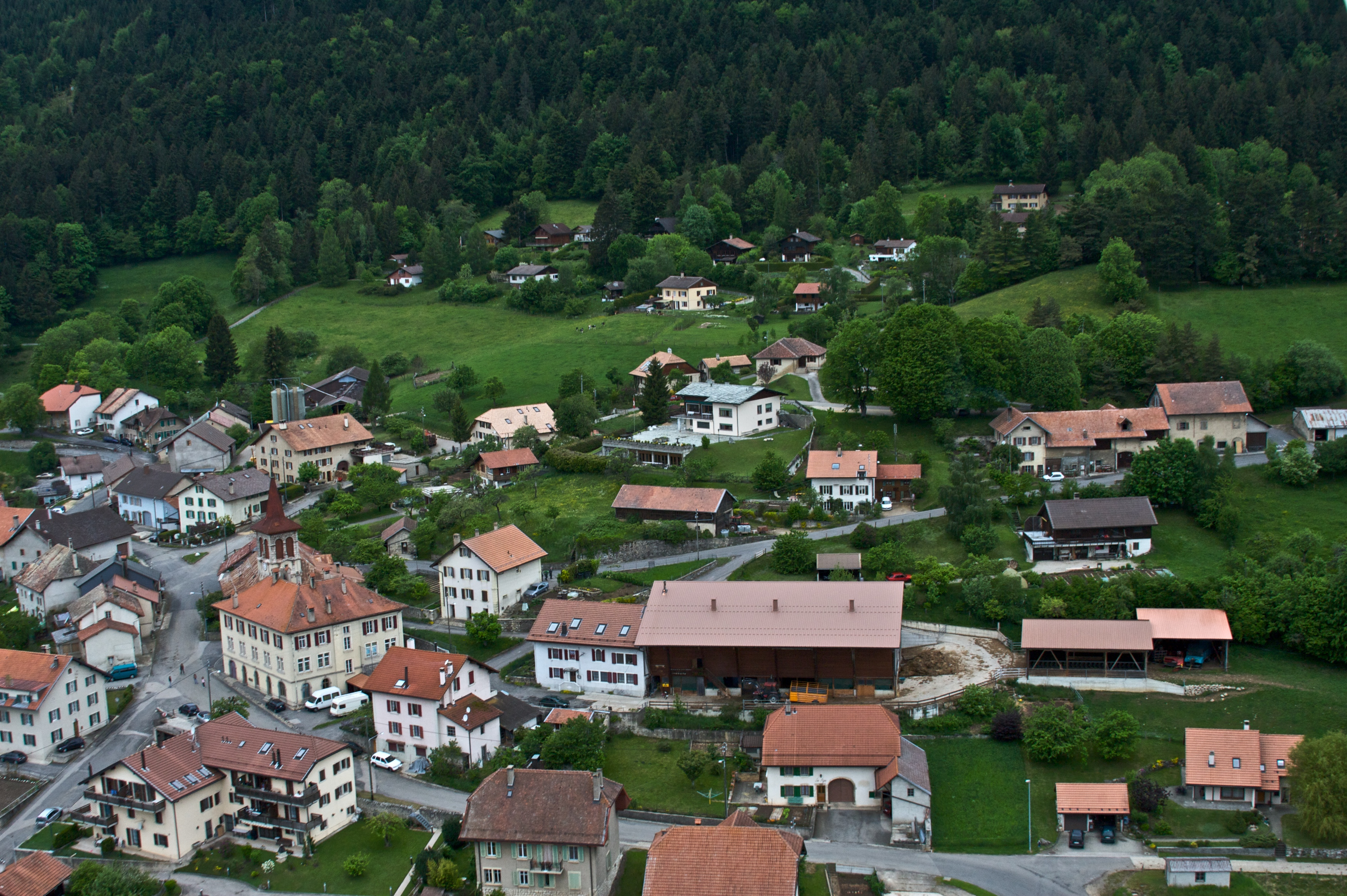
- Premier village

- Flag Coat of arms
- Location of Premier
- Location within Switzerland Location within Canton of Vaud
- Coordinates: 46°42′N 06°27′E
- Country: Switzerland
- Canton: Vaud
- District: Jura-Nord Vaudois

Government
  - Mayor: Syndic; Roger Ravessoud

Area
  - Total: 6.11 km^{2} (2.36 sq mi)
- Elevation: 869 m (2,851 ft)

Population (2004)
  - Total: 217
  - Density: 35.5/km^{2} (92.0/sq mi)
- Demonym(s): Les Promiolians; Lè Ricllia-laitia
- Time zone: UTC+01:00 (CET)
  - Summer (DST): UTC+02:00 (CEST)
- Postal code: 1324
- SFOS number: 5759
- ISO 3166 code: CH-VD
- Surrounded by: Les Clées, Bretonnières, Romainmôtier-Envy, Vaulion, Vallorbe
- Website: www.premier.ch

Premier is a municipality in the district of Jura-Nord Vaudois in the canton of Vaud in Switzerland.

== History ==
Aerial view (1964)

Premier is first mentioned in 1403 as Prumyer. A hamlet known as Lanfrey which was mentioned in the 14th century but vanished in the 15th, existed on or near the site of the village of Premier.

== Geography ==
Premier has an area, as of 2009, of 6.1 square kilometers (2.4 mi^{2}). Of this area, 2.9 km^{2} (1.1 mi^{2}) or 47.4% is used for agricultural purposes, while 2.96 km^{2} (1.14 mi^{2}) or 48.4% is forested. Of the rest of the land, 0.18 km^{2} (0.069 mi^{2}) or 2.9% is settled (buildings or roads).

Of the built up area, housing and buildings made up 1.8% and transportation infrastructure made up 1.1%. Out of the forested land, 44.3% of the total land area is heavily forested and 4.1% is covered with orchards or small clusters of trees. Of the agricultural land, 19.6% is used for growing crops and 19.1% is pastures and 8.2% is used for alpine pastures.

The municipality was part of the Orbe District until it was dissolved on 31 August 2006, and Premier became part of the new district of Jura-Nord Vaudois.

The municipality is located in the foothills of Mont-Buffet. It consists of the linear village of Premier.

== Coat of arms ==
The blazon of the municipal coat of arms is Per pale Argent and Gules, overall a Plum-tree eradicated Vert fructed Azure.

== Demographics ==
Premier has a population (as of December 2020) of 218. As of 2008, 2.7% of the population are resident foreign nationals. Over the last 10 years (1999–2009 ) the population has changed at a rate of -13.5%. It has changed at a rate of -8.4% due to migration and at a rate of -5.1% due to births and deaths.

Most of the population (as of 2000) speaks French (196 or 94.2%), with English being second most common (5 or 2.4%) and German being third (4 or 1.9%). There is 1 person who speaks Italian.

The age distribution, as of 2009, in Premier is; 6 children or 3.2% of the population are between 0 and 9 years old and 24 teenagers or 12.9% are between 10 and 19. Of the adult population, 29 people or 15.6% of the population are between 20 and 29 years old. 16 people or 8.6% are between 30 and 39, 19 people or 10.2% are between 40 and 49, and 41 people or 22.0% are between 50 and 59. The senior population distribution is 23 people or 12.4% of the population are between 60 and 69 years old, 10 people or 5.4% are between 70 and 79, there are 17 people or 9.1% who are between 80 and 89, and there is 1 person who is 90 and older.

As of 2000, there were 81 people who were single and never married in the municipality. There were 108 married individuals, 8 widows or widowers and 11 individuals who are divorced.

As of 2000, there were 81 private households in the municipality, and an average of 2.5 persons per household. There were 23 households that consist of only one person and 11 households with five or more people. Out of a total of 84 households that answered this question, 27.4% were households made up of just one person. Of the rest of the households, there are 25 married couples without children, 30 married couples with children There were 2 single parents with a child or children. There was 1 household that was made up of unrelated people and 3 households that were made up of some sort of institution or another collective housing.

In 2000 there were 52 single family homes (or 67.5% of the total) out of a total of 77 inhabited buildings. There were 10 multi-family buildings (13.0%), along with 11 multi-purpose buildings that were mostly used for housing (14.3%) and 4 other use buildings (commercial or industrial) that also had some housing (5.2%).

In 2000, a total of 79 apartments (82.3% of the total) were permanently occupied, while 14 apartments (14.6%) were seasonally occupied and 3 apartments (3.1%) were empty. As of 2009, the construction rate of new housing units was 0 new units per 1000 residents. The vacancy rate for the municipality, in 2010, was 0%.

The historical population is given in the following chart:

== Politics ==
In the 2007 federal election the most popular party was the SVP which received 25.39% of the vote. The next three most popular parties were the SP (18.99%), the FDP (15.22%) and the Other (11.58%). In the federal election, a total of 85 votes were cast, and the voter turnout was 56.7%.

== Economy ==
As of 2010, Premier had an unemployment rate of 3.1%. As of 2008, there were 16 people employed in the primary economic sector and about 5 businesses involved in this sector. Ten people were employed in the secondary sector and there were 5 businesses in this sector. Thirteen people were employed in the tertiary sector, with 4 businesses in this sector. There were 96 residents of the municipality who were employed in some capacity, of which females made up 39.6% of the workforce.

In 2008 the total number of full-time equivalent jobs was 31. The number of jobs in the primary sector was 12, all of which were in agriculture. The number of jobs in the secondary sector was 10, all of which were in manufacturing. The number of jobs in the tertiary sector was 9. In the tertiary sector; 6 or 66.7% were in a hotel or restaurant, 1 was in the information industry, 1 was in education.

In 2000, there were 4 workers who commuted into the municipality and 62 workers who commuted away. The municipality is a net exporter of workers, with about 15.5 workers leaving the municipality for every one entering. Of the working population, 10.4% used public transportation to get to work, and 64.6% used a private car.

== Religion ==
From the 2000 census, 26 or 12.5% were Roman Catholic, while 151 or 72.6% belonged to the Swiss Reformed Church. Of the rest of the population, there was 1 member of an Orthodox church, there was 1 individual who belongs to the Christian Catholic Church, and there was 1 individual who belongs to another Christian church. 18 (or about 8.65% of the population) belonged to no church, are agnostic or atheist, and 10 individuals (or about 4.81% of the population) did not answer the question.

== Education ==
In Premier about 72 or (34.6%) of the population have completed non-mandatory upper secondary education, and 31 or (14.9%) have completed additional higher education (either university or a Fachhochschule). Of the 31 who completed tertiary schooling, 45.2% were Swiss men, 48.4% were Swiss women.

In the 2009/2010 school year there were a total of 14 students in the Premier school district. In the Vaud cantonal school system, two years of non-obligatory pre-school are provided by the political districts. During the school year, the political district provided pre-school care for a total of 578 children of which 359 children (62.1%) received subsidized pre-school care. The canton's primary school program requires students to attend for four years. There were 3 students in the municipal primary school program. The obligatory lower secondary school program lasts for six years and there were 11 students in those schools.

As of 2000, there were 21 students in Premier who came from another municipality, while 31 residents attended schools outside the municipality.
