= Bretonnières railway station =

Railway station in Bretonnières, Switzerland

Bretonnières
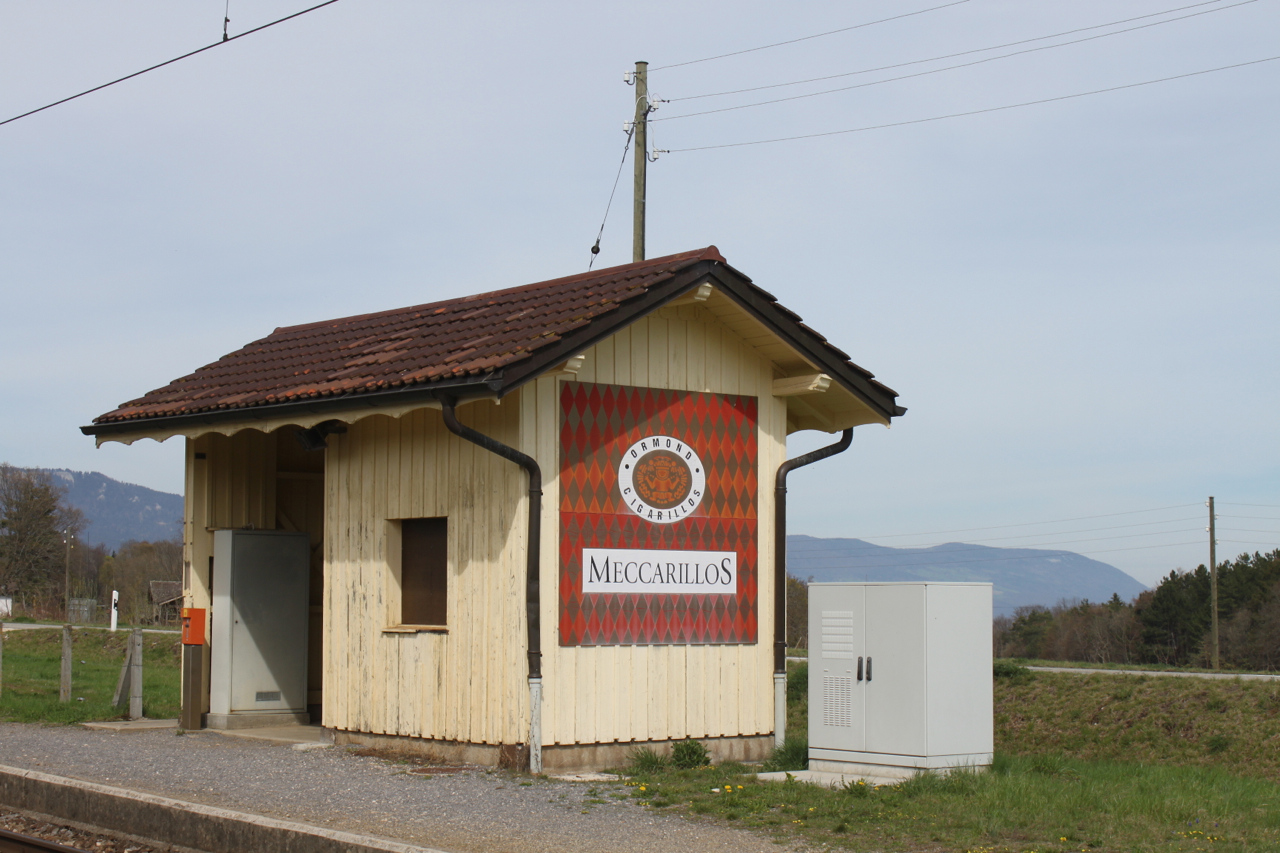
- The station shelter in 2011

General information
- Location: Bretonnières; Switzerland
- Coordinates: 46°42′54″N 6°28′29″E
- Elevation: 673 m (2,208 ft)
- Owner: Swiss Federal Railways
- Line: Simplon line
- Distance: 35.8 km (22.2 mi) from Lausanne
- Platforms: 2 side platforms
- Tracks: 2
- Train operators: Swiss Federal Railways

Construction
- Parking: Yes (10 spaces)
- Cycle facilities: Yes (7 spaces)
- Accessible: No

Other information
- Station code: 8501105 (BRT)
- Fare zone: 112 (mobilis)

Passengers
- 2023: 60 per weekday (SBB)

Services
Preceding station	RER Vaud	Following station
Le Day towards Vallorbe	R3	Croy-Romainmôtier towards Vevey
Location

Bretonnières railway station (French: Gare de Bretonnières) is a railway station in the municipality of Bretonnières, in the Swiss canton of Vaud. It is an intermediate stop on the standard gauge Simplon line of Swiss Federal Railways.

== Services ==
As of the December 2024 timetable change, the following services stop at Bretonnières:

- RER Vaud R3: hourly service between Vallorbe and Bex; limited service to St-Maurice.
