= Romainmôtier-Envy =

- Municipality
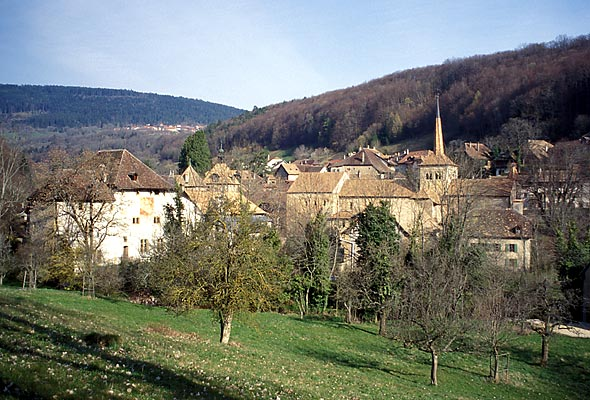
- Romainmôtier village

- Flag Coat of arms
- Location of Romainmôtier-Envy
- Location within Switzerland Location within Canton of Vaud
- Coordinates: 46°42′N 6°28′E
- Country: Switzerland
- Canton: Vaud
- District: Jura-Nord Vaudois

Government
  - Mayor: Syndic ad Fabrice De Icco

Area
  - Total: 7.01 km^{2} (2.71 sq mi)
- Elevation: 659 m (2,162 ft)

Population (2004)
  - Total: 442
  - Density: 63.1/km^{2} (163/sq mi)
- Time zone: UTC+01:00 (CET)
  - Summer (DST): UTC+02:00 (CEST)
- Postal code: 1323
- SFOS number: 5761
- ISO 3166 code: CH-VD
- Localities: Romainmôtier, Envy, Le Fochau
- Surrounded by: Bofflens, Bretonnières, Croy, Ferreyres, Juriens, La Sarraz, Moiry, Premier, Vaulion
- Twin towns: Nagaoka (Japan)
- Website: www.romainmotier.ch

Romainmôtier-Envy (French pronunciation: [ʁɔmɛ̃motje ɑ̃vi]) is a municipality in the canton of Vaud in Switzerland, located in the district of Jura-Nord Vaudois.

The village, which lies on the Nozon river, has about 450 inhabitants. The town has a notable Romanesque church. The monastery of Romainmôtier (Romanum monasterium) was founded by Romanus of Condat, a leader of monks, after whom it was named.

The municipality was created in 1970 by a merger of Romainmôtier and Envy.

== History ==
Envy is first mentioned in 1216 as Envi. Romainmôtier is first mentioned in the 7th Century as monasterio qui […] cognominatur Romanus.

== Geography ==
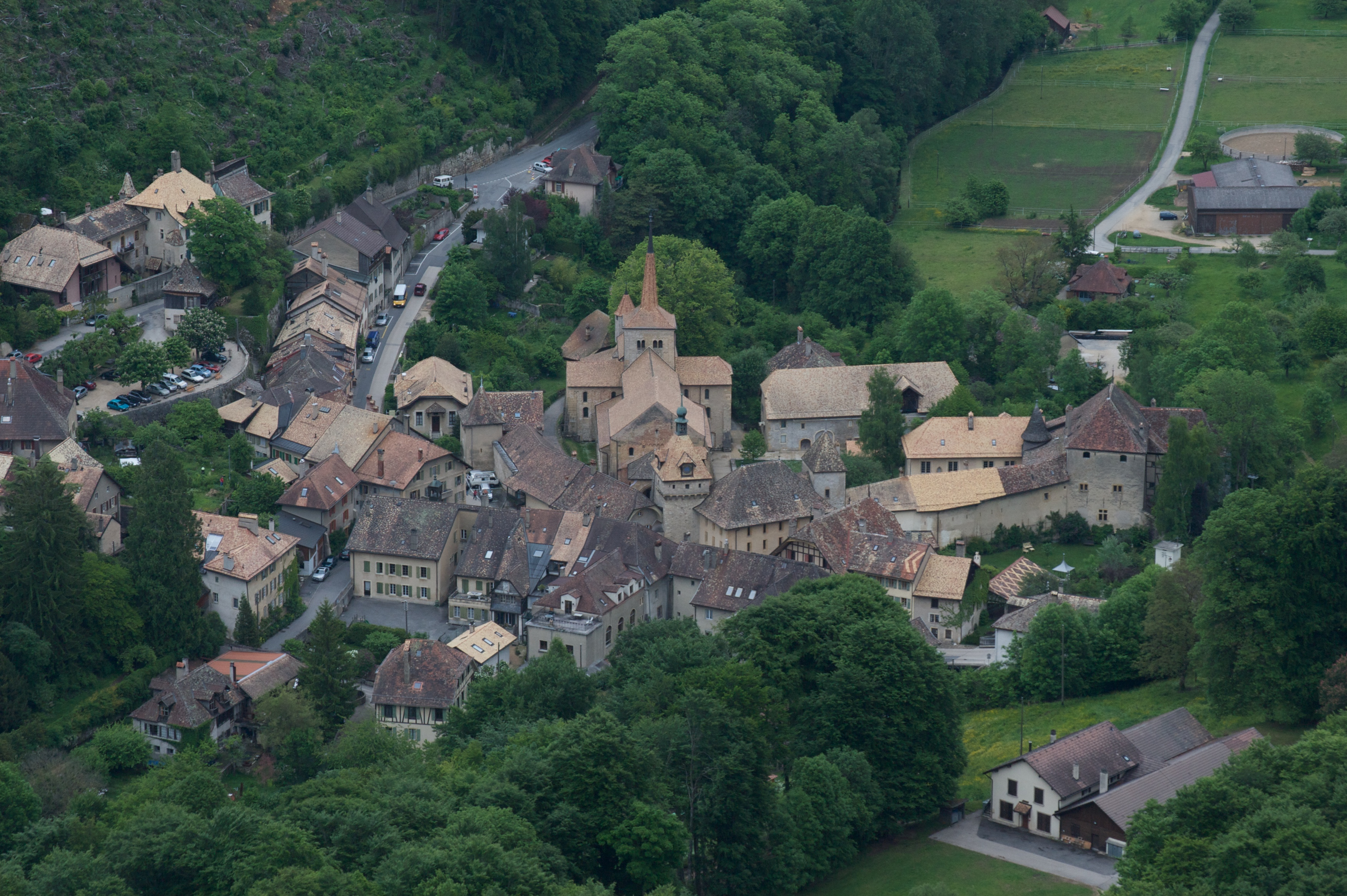
Aerial view of Romainmôtier

Aerial view (1949)

Romainmôtier-Envy has an area, as of 2009, of 7 square kilometers (2.7 mi^{2}). Of this area, 1.91 km^{2} (0.74 mi^{2}) or 27.4% is used for agricultural purposes, while 4.64 km^{2} (1.79 mi^{2}) or 66.6% is forested. Of the rest of the land, 0.41 km^{2} (0.16 mi^{2}) or 5.9% is settled (buildings or roads) and 0.01 km^{2} (2.5 acres) or 0.1% is unproductive land.

Of the built up area, housing and buildings made up 1.7% and transportation infrastructure made up 2.9%. Out of the forested land, 65.1% of the total land area is heavily forested and 1.4% is covered with orchards or small clusters of trees. Of the agricultural land, 15.1% is used for growing crops and 12.1% is pastures.

The municipality was part of the Orbe District until it was dissolved on 31 August 2006, and Romainmôtier-Envy became part of the new district of Jura-Nord Vaudois.

== Coat of arms ==
The blazon of the municipal coat of arms is Per pale: 1. Argent a Key Gules; 2. Gules a Sword Argent.

== Demographics ==
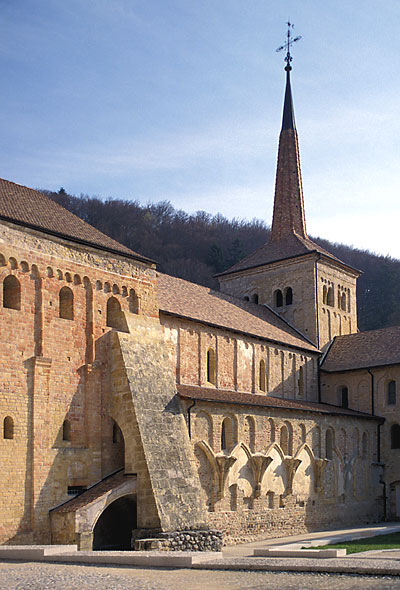
The church in Romainmôtier.

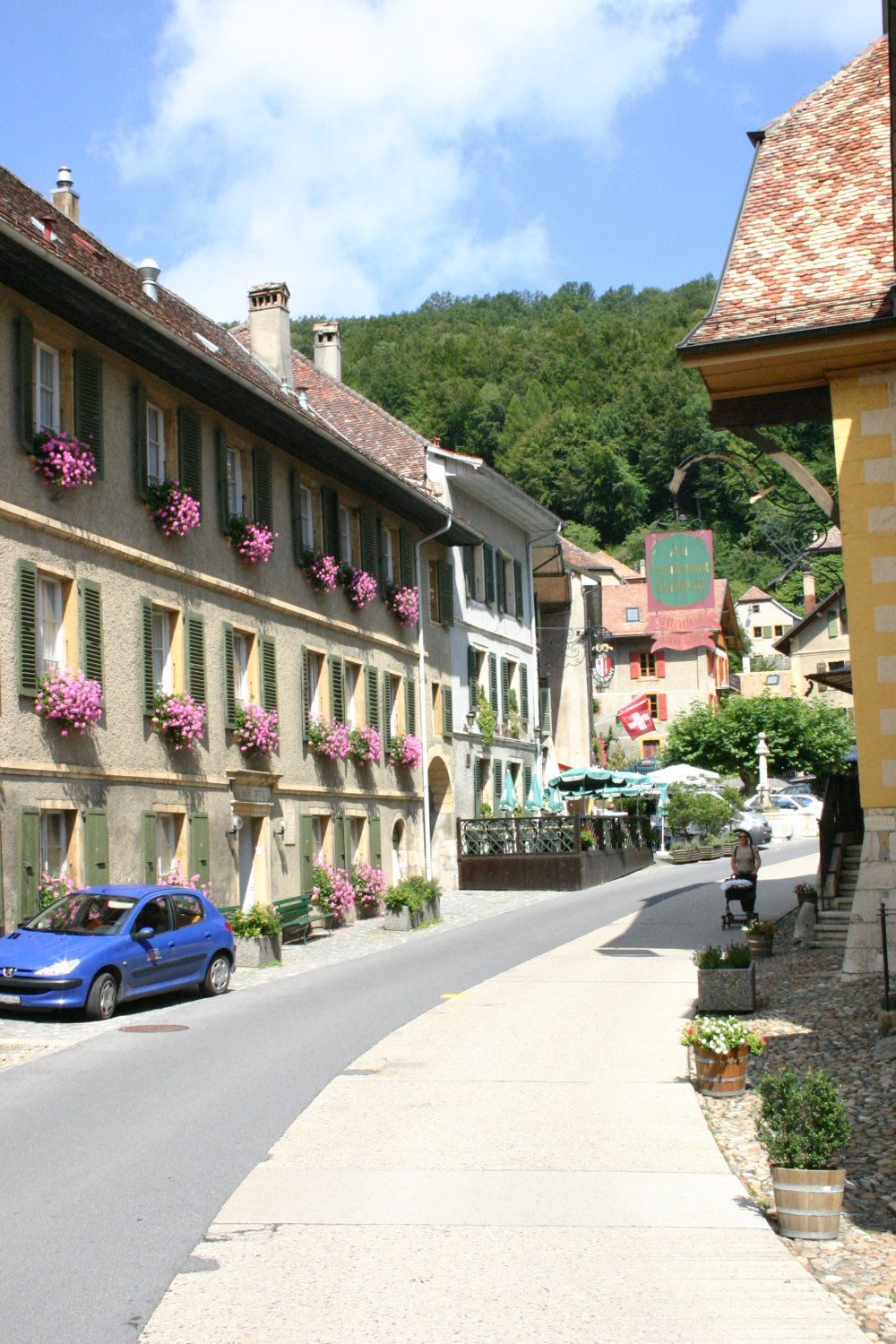
Houses in Romainmôtier

Romainmôtier-Envy has a population (as of December 2020) of 526. As of 2008, 12.5% of the population are resident foreign nationals. Over the last 10 years (1999–2009 ) the population has changed at a rate of 12.6%. It has changed at a rate of 15.3% due to migration and at a rate of -2.7% due to births and deaths.

Most of the population (as of 2000) speaks French (396 or 91.0%), with German being second most common (23 or 5.3%) and Italian being third (9 or 2.1%).

The age distribution, as of 2009, in Romainmôtier-Envy is; 38 children or 8.4% of the population are between 0 and 9 years old and 52 teenagers or 11.4% are between 10 and 19. Of the adult population, 58 people or 12.7% of the population are between 20 and 29 years old. 62 people or 13.6% are between 30 and 39, 62 people or 13.6% are between 40 and 49, and 63 people or 13.8% are between 50 and 59. The senior population distribution is 53 people or 11.6% of the population are between 60 and 69 years old, 41 people or 9.0% are between 70 and 79, there are 24 people or 5.3% who are between 80 and 89, and there are 2 people or 0.4% who are 90 and older.

As of 2000, there were 168 people who were single and never married in the municipality. There were 199 married individuals, 39 widows or widowers and 29 individuals who are divorced.

As of 2000, there were 187 private households in the municipality, and an average of 2.1 persons per household. There were 83 households that consist of only one person and 12 households with five or more people. Out of a total of 195 households that answered this question, 42.6% were households made up of just one person and there was 1 adult who lived with their parents. Of the rest of the households, there are 49 married couples without children, 45 married couples with children There were 5 single parents with a child or children. There were 4 households that were made up of unrelated people and 8 households that were made up of some sort of institution or another collective housing.

In 2000 there were 73 single family homes (or 51.4% of the total) out of a total of 142 inhabited buildings. There were 42 multi-family buildings (29.6%), along with 12 multi-purpose buildings that were mostly used for housing (8.5%) and 15 other use buildings (commercial or industrial) that also had some housing (10.6%).

In 2000, a total of 177 apartments (72.2% of the total) were permanently occupied, while 52 apartments (21.2%) were seasonally occupied and 16 apartments (6.5%) were empty. As of 2009, the construction rate of new housing units was 2.2 new units per 1000 residents. The vacancy rate for the municipality, in 2010, was 0.8%.

The historical population is given in the following chart:

== Heritage sites of national significance ==
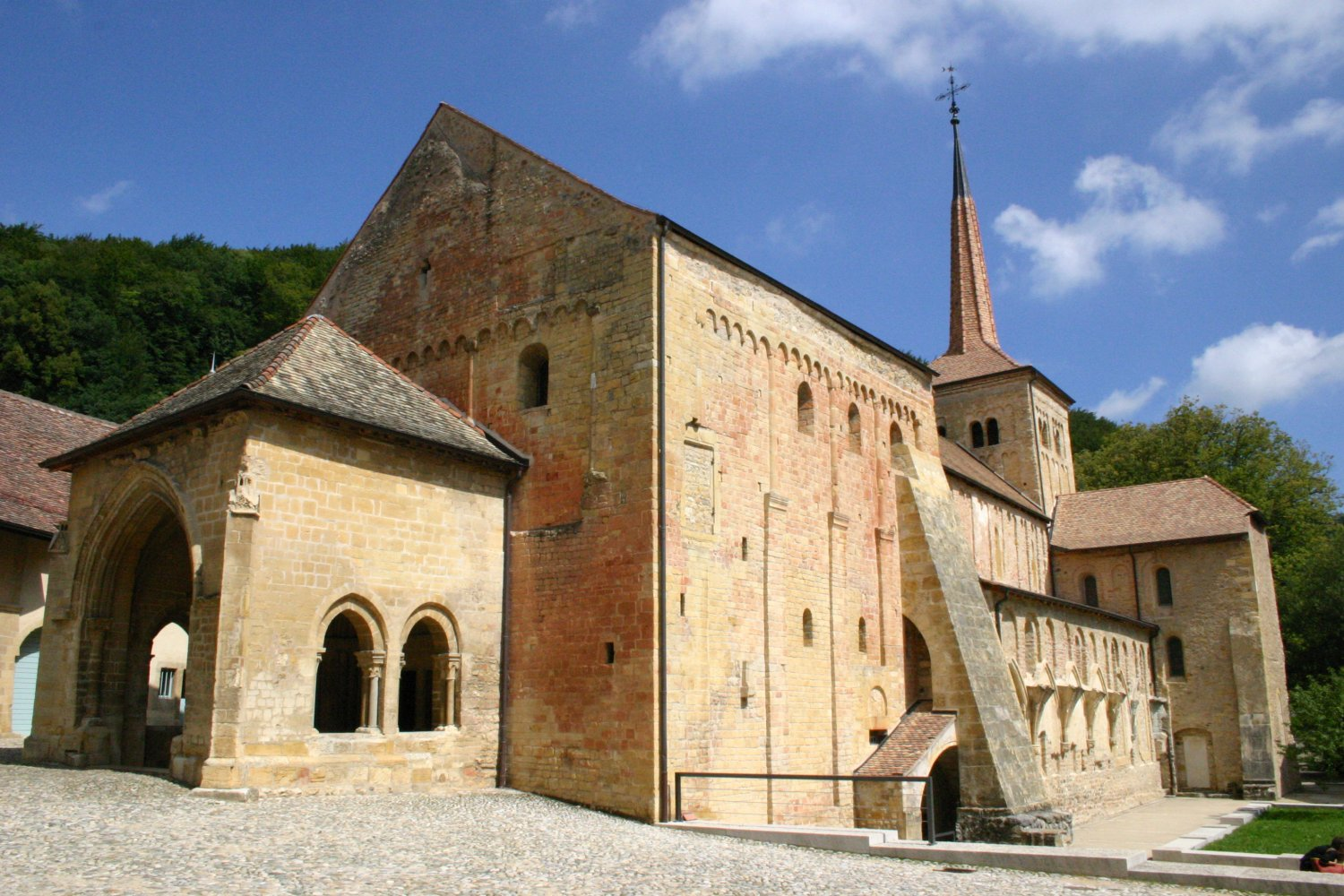
Clunic Romainmôtier Abbey

The former Cluniac Romainmôtier Abbey and a prehistoric and medieval foundry are listed as Swiss heritage site of national significance. The entire town of Romainmôtier-Envy is part of the Inventory of Swiss Heritage Sites.

== Politics ==
In the 2007 federal election the most popular party was the SP which received 25.64% of the vote. The next three most popular parties were the Green Party (21.44%), the SVP (21.1%) and the PdA Party (8.74%). In the federal election, a total of 155 votes were cast, and the voter turnout was 48.6%.

== Economy ==
As of 2010, Romainmôtier-Envy had an unemployment rate of 5.5%. As of 2008, there were 12 people employed in the primary economic sector and about 4 businesses involved in this sector. 37 people were employed in the secondary sector and there were 5 businesses in this sector. 106 people were employed in the tertiary sector, with 19 businesses in this sector. There were 210 residents of the municipality who were employed in some capacity, of which females made up 45.2% of the workforce.

In 2008 the total number of full-time equivalent jobs was 113. The number of jobs in the primary sector was 8, all of which were in agriculture. The number of jobs in the secondary sector was 36 of which 33 or (91.7%) were in manufacturing and 3 (8.3%) were in construction. The number of jobs in the tertiary sector was 69. In the tertiary sector; 10 or 14.5% were in wholesale or retail sales or the repair of motor vehicles, 3 or 4.3% were in the movement and storage of goods, 15 or 21.7% were in a hotel or restaurant, 1 was a technical professional or scientist, 3 or 4.3% were in education and 33 or 47.8% were in health care.

In 2000, there were 111 workers who commuted into the municipality and 144 workers who commuted away. The municipality is a net exporter of workers, with about 1.3 workers leaving the municipality for every one entering. About 14.4% of the workforce coming into Romainmôtier-Envy are coming from outside Switzerland. Of the working population, 9.5% used public transportation to get to work, and 64.8% used a private car.

== Religion ==
From the 2000 census, 64 or 14.7% were Roman Catholic, while 239 or 54.9% belonged to the Swiss Reformed Church. Of the rest of the population, there were 2 members of an Orthodox church (or about 0.46% of the population), and there were 39 individuals (or about 8.97% of the population) who belonged to another Christian church. There were 2 individuals (or about 0.46% of the population) who were Jewish, and there was 1 individual who was Islamic. There were 1 individual who belonged to another church. 90 (or about 20.69% of the population) belonged to no church, are agnostic or atheist, and 15 individuals (or about 3.45% of the population) did not answer the question.

== Education ==
In Romainmôtier-Envy about 145 or (33.3%) of the population have completed non-mandatory upper secondary education, and 68 or (15.6%) have completed additional higher education (either university or a Fachhochschule). Of the 68 who completed tertiary schooling, 48.5% were Swiss men, 36.8% were Swiss women, 10.3% were non-Swiss men.

In the 2009/2010 school year there were a total of 56 students in the Romainmôtier-Envy school district. In the Vaud cantonal school system, two years of non-obligatory pre-school are provided by the political districts. During the school year, the political district provided pre-school care for a total of 578 children of which 359 children (62.1%) received subsidized pre-school care. The canton's primary school program requires students to attend for four years. There were 25 students in the municipal primary school program. The obligatory lower secondary school program lasts for six years and there were 26 students in those schools. There were also 5 students who were home schooled or attended another non-traditional school.

As of 2000, there were 17 students in Romainmôtier-Envy who came from another municipality, while 55 residents attended schools outside the municipality.
