= Bofflens =

- Municipality
- Flag Coat of arms
- Location of Bofflens
- Location within Switzerland Location within Canton of Vaud
- Coordinates: 46°42′N 06°30′E
- Country: Switzerland
- Canton: Vaud
- District: Jura-Nord Vaudois

Government
  - Mayor: Syndic; Danièle Roussy

Area
  - Total: 4.19 km^{2} (1.62 sq mi)
- Elevation: 577 m (1,893 ft)

Population (2004)
  - Total: 162
  - Density: 38.7/km^{2} (100/sq mi)
- Demonym(s): Les Bocanis; Lè Z'Ozi
- Time zone: UTC+01:00 (CET)
  - Summer (DST): UTC+02:00 (CEST)
- Postal code: 1353
- SFOS number: 5747
- ISO 3166 code: CH-VD
- Surrounded by: Agiez, Arnex-sur-Orbe, Croy, Romainmôtier-Envy, Bretonnières
- Website: www.bofflens.ch

Bofflens is a municipality in the district of Jura-Nord Vaudois in the canton of Vaud in Switzerland.

== History ==
Bofflens is first mentioned in 1007 as in curte Bofflenis. In 1011 it was mentioned as Boflinges.

== Geography ==
Bofflens has an area, as of 2009, of 4.2 square kilometers (1.6 mi^{2}). Of this area, 3.01 km^{2} (1.16 mi^{2}) or 71.3% is used for agricultural purposes, while 0.96 km^{2} (0.37 mi^{2}) or 22.7% is forested. Of the rest of the land, 0.24 km^{2} (0.093 mi^{2}) or 5.7% is settled (buildings or roads).

Of the built up area, housing and buildings made up 2.1% and transportation infrastructure made up 2.1%. Power and water infrastructure as well as other special developed areas made up 1.4% of the area Out of the forested land, all of the forested land area is covered with heavy forests. Of the agricultural land, 57.8% is used for growing crops and 13.0% is pastures.

The municipality was part of the Orbe District until it was dissolved on 31 August 2006, and Bofflens became part of the new district of Jura-Nord Vaudois.

The municipality is located between the Orbe valley and the foothills of the Jura Mountains.

== Coat of arms ==
The blazon of the municipal coat of arms is Per pale Argent and Gules, overall an ox head Sable annelled Or and langued of the second.

== Demographics ==
Bofflens has a population (as of December 2020) of 207. As of 2008, 8.7% of the population are resident foreign nationals. Over the last 10 years (1999–2009 ) the population has changed at a rate of 6.8%. It has changed at a rate of 11.7% due to migration and at a rate of -3.7% due to births and deaths.

Most of the population (as of 2000) speaks French (151 or 96.2%), with German being second most common (5 or 3.2%) and English being third (1 or 0.6%).

The age distribution, as of 2009, in Bofflens is; 14 children or 8.1% of the population are between 0 and 9 years old and 24 teenagers or 13.9% are between 10 and 19. Of the adult population, 13 people or 7.5% of the population are between 20 and 29 years old. 25 people or 14.5% are between 30 and 39, 35 people or 20.2% are between 40 and 49, and 30 people or 17.3% are between 50 and 59. The senior population distribution is 19 people or 11.0% of the population are between 60 and 69 years old, 4 people or 2.3% are between 70 and 79, there are 9 people or 5.2% who are between 80 and 89.

As of 2000, there were 65 people who were single and never married in the municipality. There were 77 married individuals, 8 widows or widowers and 7 individuals who are divorced.

As of 2000, there were 63 private households in the municipality, and an average of 2.5 persons per household. There were 19 households that consist of only one person and 6 households with five or more people. Out of a total of 63 households that answered this question, 30.2% were households made up of just one person and there was 1 adult who lived with their parents. Of the rest of the households, there are 16 married couples without children, 27 married couples with children

In 2000 there were 30 single family homes (or 52.6% of the total) out of a total of 57 inhabited buildings. There were 8 multi-family buildings (14.0%), along with 13 multi-purpose buildings that were mostly used for housing (22.8%) and 6 other use buildings (commercial or industrial) that also had some housing (10.5%).

In 2000, a total of 61 apartments (83.6% of the total) were permanently occupied, while 5 apartments (6.8%) were seasonally occupied and 7 apartments (9.6%) were empty. As of 2009, the construction rate of new housing units was 0 new units per 1000 residents. The vacancy rate for the municipality, in 2010, was 0%.

The historical population is given in the following chart:

== Sights ==
The entire village of Bofflens is designated as part of the Inventory of Swiss Heritage Sites.

== Politics ==
In the 2007 federal election the most popular party was the SVP which received 31.43% of the vote. The next three most popular parties were the SP (20.36%), the FDP (18.57%) and the Green Party (13.1%). In the federal election, a total of 50 votes were cast, and the voter turnout was 39.7%.

== Economy ==
As of 2010, Bofflens had an unemployment rate of 2.5%. As of 2008, there were 29 people employed in the primary economic sector and about 10 businesses involved in this sector. 9 people were employed in the secondary sector and there were 3 businesses in this sector. 21 people were employed in the tertiary sector, with 4 businesses in this sector. There were 86 residents of the municipality who were employed in some capacity, of which females made up 41.9% of the workforce.

In 2008 the total number of full-time equivalent jobs was 47. The number of jobs in the primary sector was 20, all of which were in agriculture. The number of jobs in the secondary sector was 8 of which 1 was in manufacturing and 7 (87.5%) were in construction. The number of jobs in the tertiary sector was 19. In the tertiary sector; 1 was in the sale or repair of motor vehicles, 17 or 89.5% were in the movement and storage of goods, 1 was in education.

In 2000, there were 4 workers who commuted into the municipality and 55 workers who commuted away. The municipality is a net exporter of workers, with about 13.8 workers leaving the municipality for every one entering. Of the working population, 4.7% used public transportation to get to work, and 65.1% used a private car.

== Religion ==
From the 2000 census, 9 or 5.7% were Roman Catholic, while 114 or 72.6% belonged to the Swiss Reformed Church. Of the rest of the population, there was 1 member of an Orthodox church. 23 (or about 14.65% of the population) belonged to no church, are agnostic or atheist, and 10 individuals (or about 6.37% of the population) did not answer the question.

== Education ==
In Bofflens about 68 or (43.3%) of the population have completed non-mandatory upper secondary education, and 6 or (3.8%) have completed additional higher education (either university or a Fachhochschule). Of the 6 who completed tertiary schooling, 50.0% were Swiss men, 50.0% were Swiss women.

In the 2009/2010 school year there were a total of 20 students in the Bofflens school district. In the Vaud cantonal school system, two years of non-obligatory pre-school are provided by the political districts. During the school year, the political district provided pre-school care for a total of 578 children of which 359 children (62.1%) received subsidized pre-school care. The canton's primary school program requires students to attend for four years. There were 11 students in the municipal primary school program. The obligatory lower secondary school program lasts for six years and there were 9 students in those schools.

As of 2000, there were 19 students in Bofflens who came from another municipality, while 25 residents attended schools outside the municipality.
