= Croy-Romainmôtier railway station =

Railway station in Croy, Switzerland

Croy-Romainmôtier
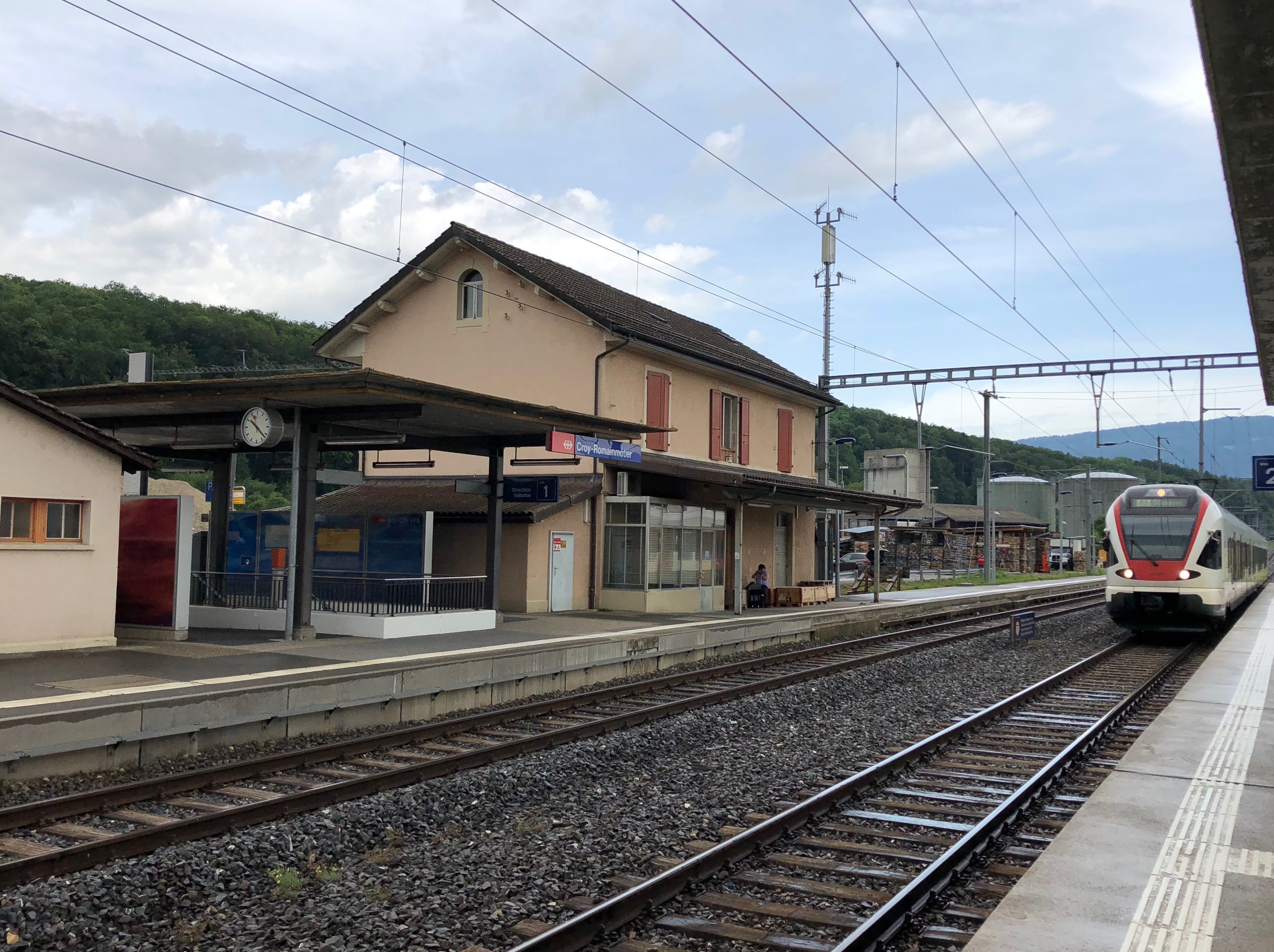
- The station in 2018

General information
- Location: Croy; Switzerland
- Coordinates: 46°41′48″N 6°28′41″E
- Elevation: 641 m (2,103 ft)
- Owner: Swiss Federal Railways
- Line: Simplon line
- Distance: 33.7 km (20.9 mi) from Lausanne
- Platforms: 2 side platforms
- Tracks: 2
- Train operators: Swiss Federal Railways
- Connections: CarPostal SA buses

Construction
- Parking: Yes (34 spaces)
- Cycle facilities: Yes (15 spaces)
- Accessible: Partly

Other information
- Station code: 8501106 (CR)
- Fare zone: 112 (mobilis)

Passengers
- 2023: 550 per weekday (SBB)

Services
Preceding station	RER Vaud	Following station
Bretonnières towards Vallorbe	R3	Arnex towards Vevey
Le Day towards Le Brassus or Vallorbe	R4	Arnex towards Vevey
Location

Croy-Romainmôtier railway station (French: Gare de Croy-Romainmôtier) is a railway station in the municipality of Croy, in the Swiss canton of Vaud. It is an intermediate stop on the standard gauge Simplon line of Swiss Federal Railways.

== Services ==
As of the December 2024 timetable change, the following services stop at Croy-Romainmôtier:

- RER Vaud R3 / R4: half-hourly (hourly on weekends) service between Vallorbe and Bex; hourly service to Le Brassus; limited service from Bex to St-Maurice.
