= Romainmôtier =

Coordinates: 46°42′N 6°28′E

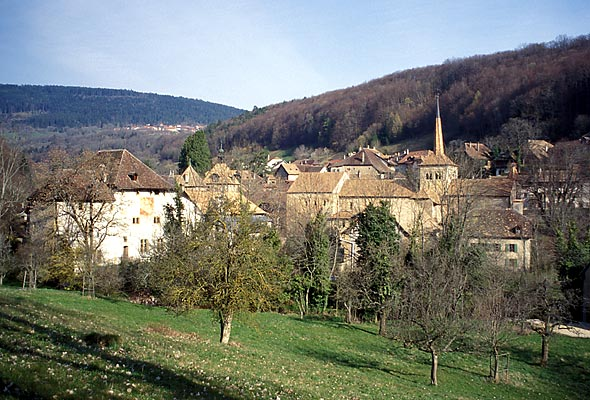
Romainmôtier.

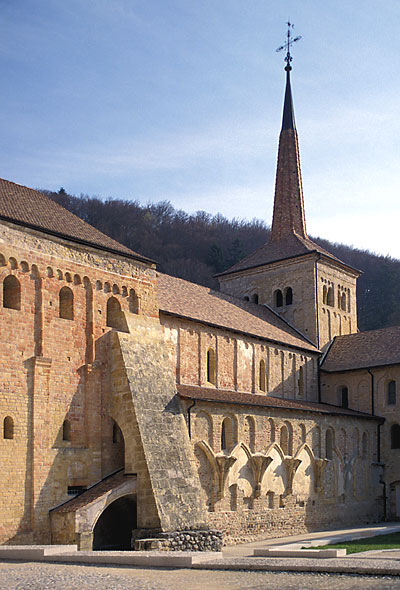
The Romanesque church in Romainmôtier.

Romainmôtier is a village and former municipality in the district of Orbe in the canton of Vaud, Switzerland.

== History ==
Its name was taken from the monastery of Romainmôtier that was founded by Saint Romain around AD 450.

In 1970 the municipality was merged with the neighboring municipality Envy to form a new and larger municipality Romainmôtier-Envy.
