= Orbe District =

Coordinates: 46°43′N 6°31′E

Orbe District was a district of the canton of Vaud, Switzerland.

== Mergers and name changes ==
- On 1 January 1970 the former municipalities of Envy and Romainmôtier merged to form the new municipality of Romainmôtier-Envy.
- On 1 September 2006 the municipalities of L'Abergement, Agiez, Arnex-sur-Orbe, Ballaigues, Baulmes, Bavois, Bofflens, Bretonnières, Chavornay, Les Clées, Corcelles-sur-Chavornay, Croy, Juriens, Lignerolle, Montcherand, Orbe, La Praz, Premier, Rances, Romainmôtier-Envy, Sergey, Valeyres-sous-Rances, Vallorbe, Vaulion and Vuiteboeuf came from the District d'Orbe to join the Jura-North Vaudois District.

== Municipalities ==
- Agiez
- Arnex-sur-Orbe
- Ballaigues
- Baulmes
- Bavois
- Bofflens
- Bretonnières
- Chavornay
- Corcelles-sur-Chavornay
- Croy
- Juriens
- La Praz
- L'Abergement
- Les Clées
- Lignerolle
- Montcherand
- Orbe
- Premier
- Rances
- Romainmôtier-Envy
- Sergey
- Valeyres-sous-Rances
- Vallorbe
- Vaulion
- Vuiteboeuf
