= Le Lieu railway station =

Railway station in Le Lieu, Switzerland

Le Lieu
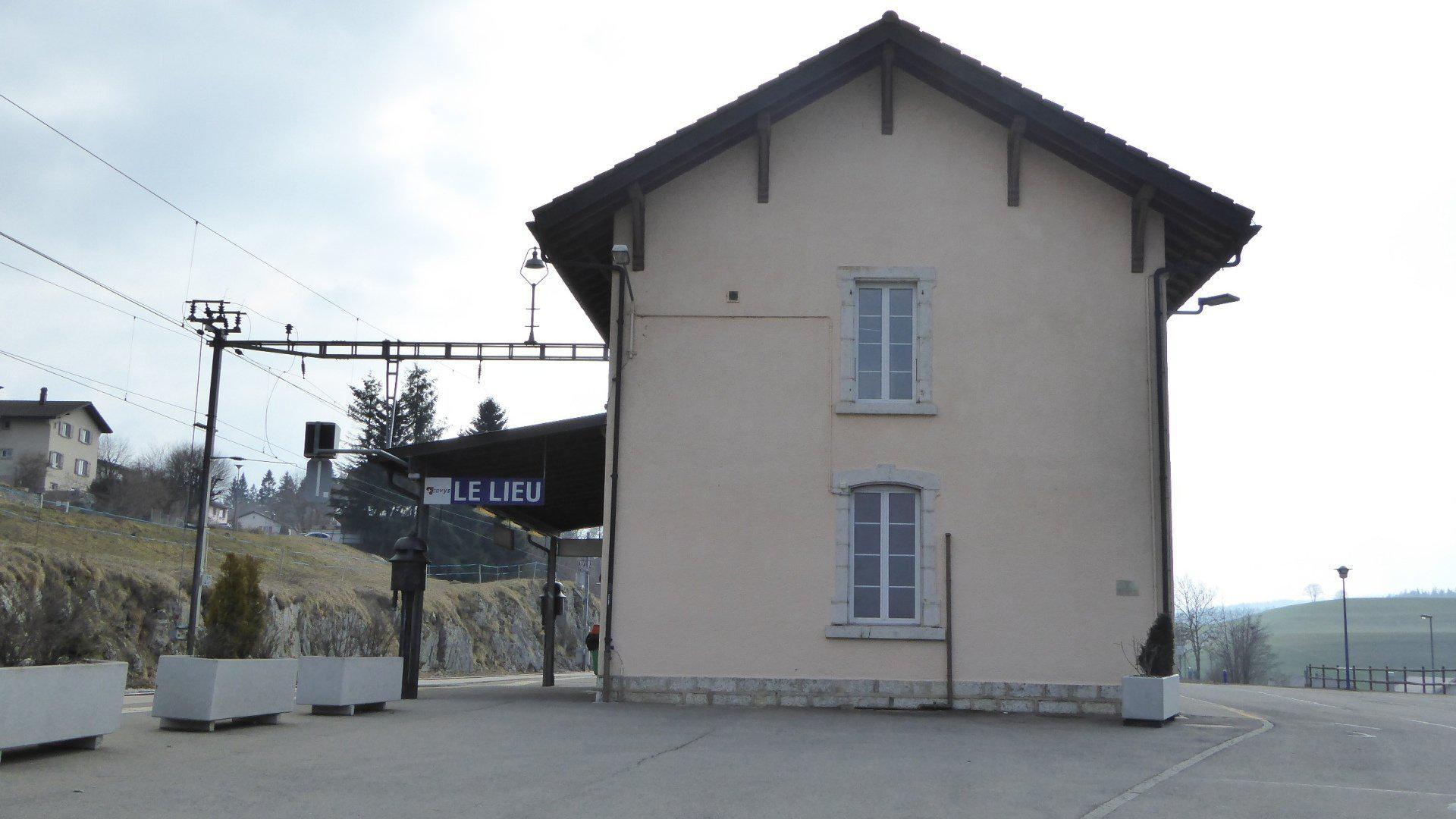
- The station in 2019

General information
- Location: Le Lieu; Switzerland
- Coordinates: 46°38′49″N 6°16′59″E
- Elevation: 1,050 m (3,440 ft)
- Owner: Travys
- Line: Vallorbe–Le Brassus line
- Distance: 15.5 km (9.6 mi) from Vallorbe
- Platforms: 1 side platform
- Tracks: 2
- Train operators: Swiss Federal Railways

Construction
- Accessible: No

Other information
- Station code: 8501153 (LIEU)
- Fare zone: 117 (mobilis)

Passengers
- 2023: 160 per weekday (SBB)

Services
Preceding station	RER Vaud	Following station
Les Esserts-de-Rive towards Le Brassus	R4	Le Séchey towards Vevey
Location

Le Lieu railway station (French: Gare de Le lieu) is a railway station in the municipality of Le Lieu, in the Swiss canton of Vaud. It is an intermediate stop on the standard gauge Vallorbe–Le Brassus line of Swiss Federal Railways and Travys.

== Services ==
As of the December 2024 timetable change, the following services stop at Le Lieu:

- RER Vaud R4: hourly service between Bex and Le Brassus.
