= Les Charbonnières railway station =

Railway station in Le Lieu, Switzerland

Les Charbonnières
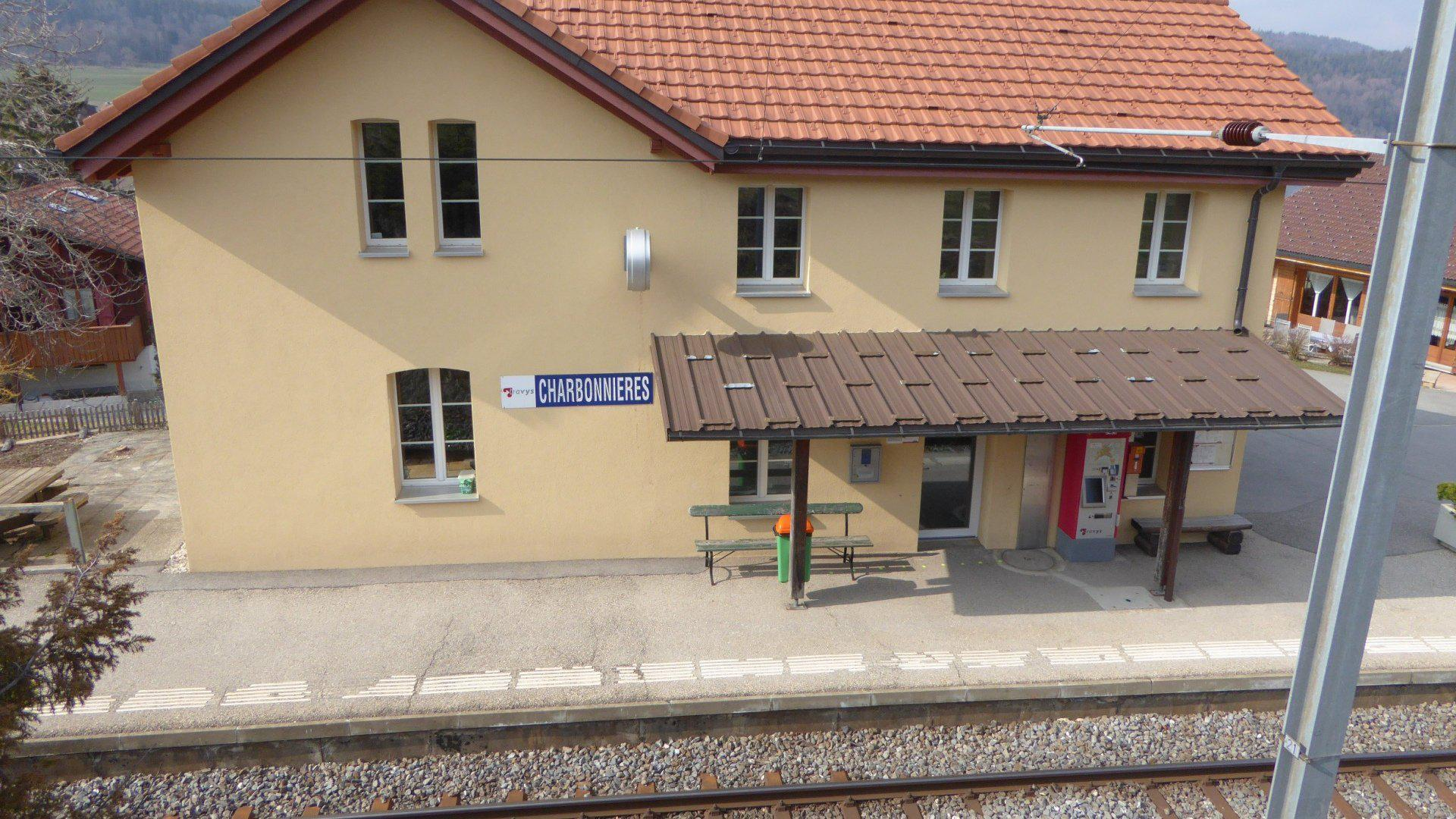
- The station in 2019

General information
- Location: Le Lieu; Switzerland
- Coordinates: 46°39′50″N 6°19′01″E
- Elevation: 1,025 m (3,363 ft)
- Owner: Travys
- Line: Vallorbe–Le Brassus line
- Distance: 12.2 km (7.6 mi) from Vallorbe
- Platforms: 1 side platform
- Tracks: 1
- Train operators: Swiss Federal Railways

Construction
- Accessible: No

Other information
- Station code: 8501151 (CHB)
- Fare zone: 116 (mobilis)

Passengers
- 2023: 100 per weekday (SBB)

Services
Preceding station	RER Vaud	Following station
Le Séchey towards Le Brassus	R4	Le Pont towards Vevey
Location

Les Charbonnières railway station (French: Gare de Les Charbonnières) is a railway station in the municipality of Le Lieu, in the Swiss canton of Vaud. It is an intermediate stop and a request stop on the standard gauge Vallorbe–Le Brassus line of Swiss Federal Railways and Travys.

== Services ==
As of the December 2024 timetable change, the following services stop at Les Charbonnières:

- RER Vaud R4: hourly service between Bex and Le Brassus.
