= Le Séchey railway station =

Railway station in Le Lieu, Switzerland

Le Séchey
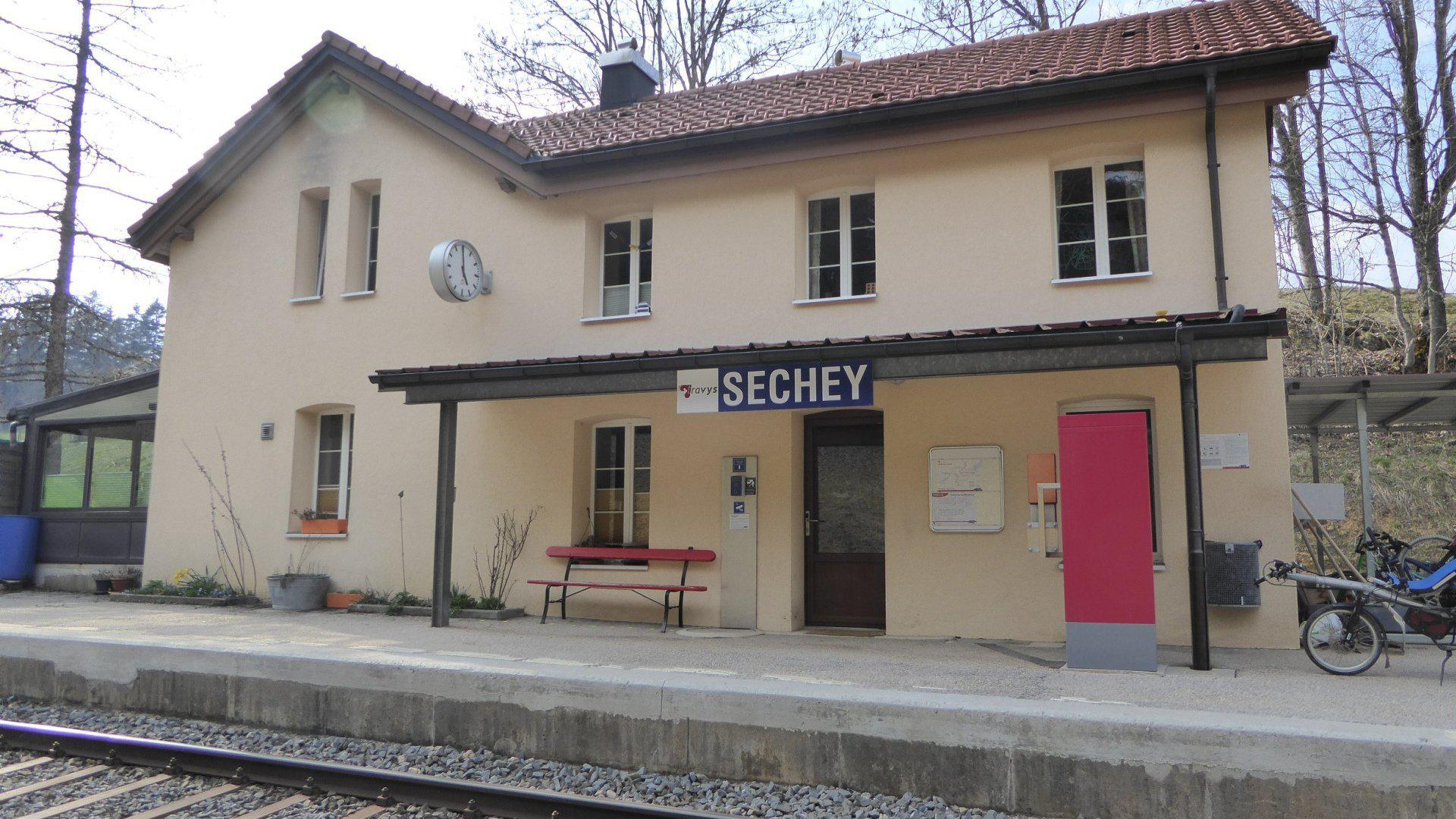
- The station in 2019

General information
- Location: Le Lieu; Switzerland
- Coordinates: 46°39′29″N 6°18′22″E
- Elevation: 1,045 m (3,428 ft)
- Owner: Travys
- Line: Vallorbe–Le Brassus line
- Distance: 13.3 km (8.3 mi) from Vallorbe
- Platforms: 1 side platform
- Tracks: 1
- Train operators: Swiss Federal Railways

Construction
- Accessible: No

Other information
- Station code: 8501152 (SEC)
- Fare zone: 116 (mobilis)

Passengers
- 2023: Fewer than 50 persons per day (SBB)

Services
Preceding station	RER Vaud	Following station
Le Lieu towards Le Brassus	R4	Les Charbonnières towards Vevey
Location

Le Séchey railway station (French: Gare de Le Séchey) is a railway station in the municipality of Le Lieu, in the Swiss canton of Vaud. It is an intermediate stop and a request stop on the standard gauge Vallorbe–Le Brassus line of Swiss Federal Railways and Travys.

== Services ==
As of the December 2024 timetable change, the following services stop at Le Séchey:

- RER Vaud R4: hourly service between Bex and Le Brassus.
