= Le Rocheray railway station =

Railway station in Le Chenit, Switzerland

Le Rocheray
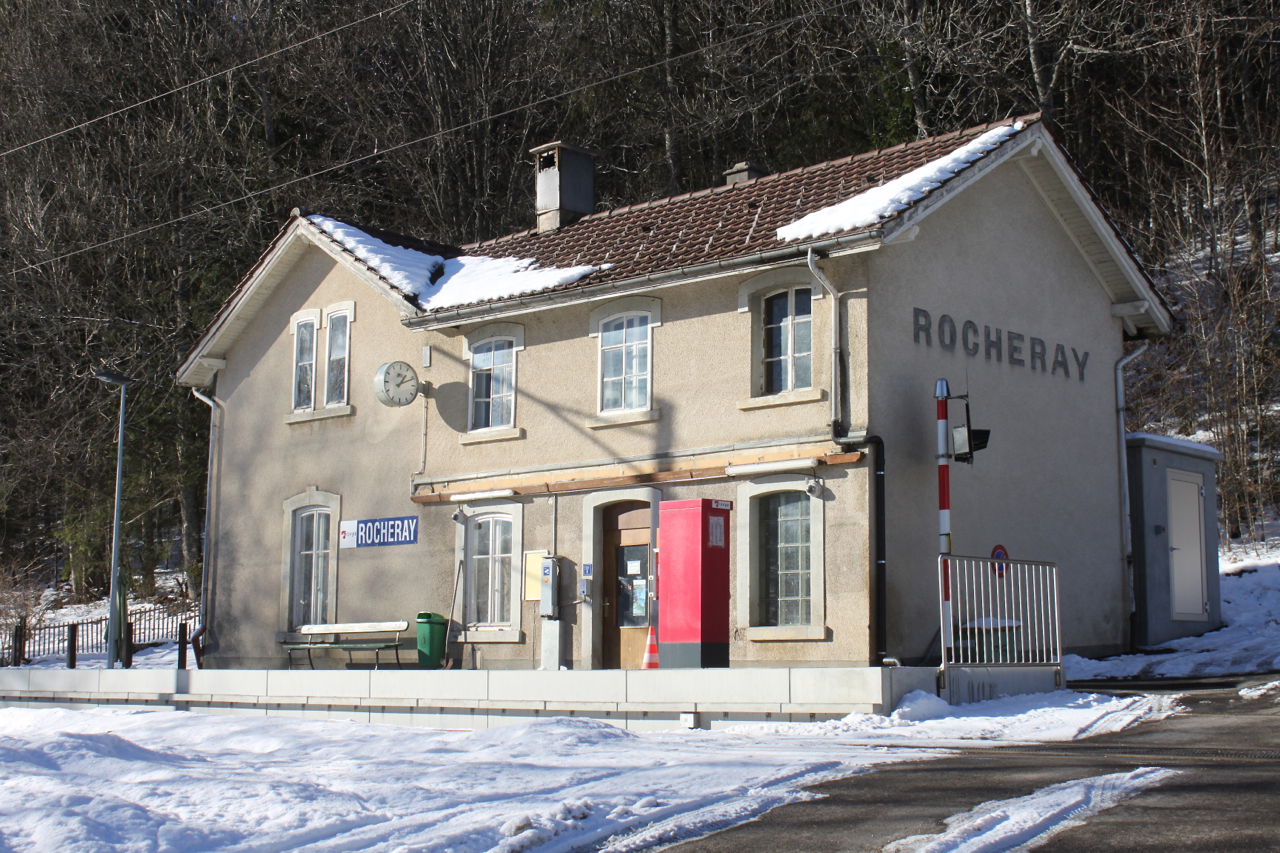
- The station in 2013

General information
- Location: Le Chenit; Switzerland
- Coordinates: 46°37′26″N 6°15′00″E
- Elevation: 1,026 m (3,366 ft)
- Owner: Travys
- Line: Vallorbe–Le Brassus line
- Distance: 19.1 km (11.9 mi) from Vallorbe
- Platforms: 1 side platform
- Tracks: 1
- Train operators: Swiss Federal Railways

Construction
- Accessible: Yes

Other information
- Station code: 8501155 (RCY)
- Fare zone: 118 (mobilis)

Passengers
- 2023: Fewer than 50 persons per day (SBB)

Services
Preceding station	RER Vaud	Following station
Le Solliat-La Golisse towards Le Brassus	R4	Les Esserts-de-Rive towards Vevey
Location

Le Rocheray railway station (French: Gare de Le Rocheray) is a railway station in the municipality of Le Chenit, in the Swiss canton of Vaud. It is an intermediate stop and a request stop on the standard gauge Vallorbe–Le Brassus line of Swiss Federal Railways and Travys.

== Services ==
As of the December 2024 timetable change, the following services stop at Le Rocheray:

- RER Vaud R4: hourly service between Bex and Le Brassus.
