= Le Sentier-L'Orient railway station =

Railway station in Le Chenit, Switzerland

Le Sentier-L'Orient
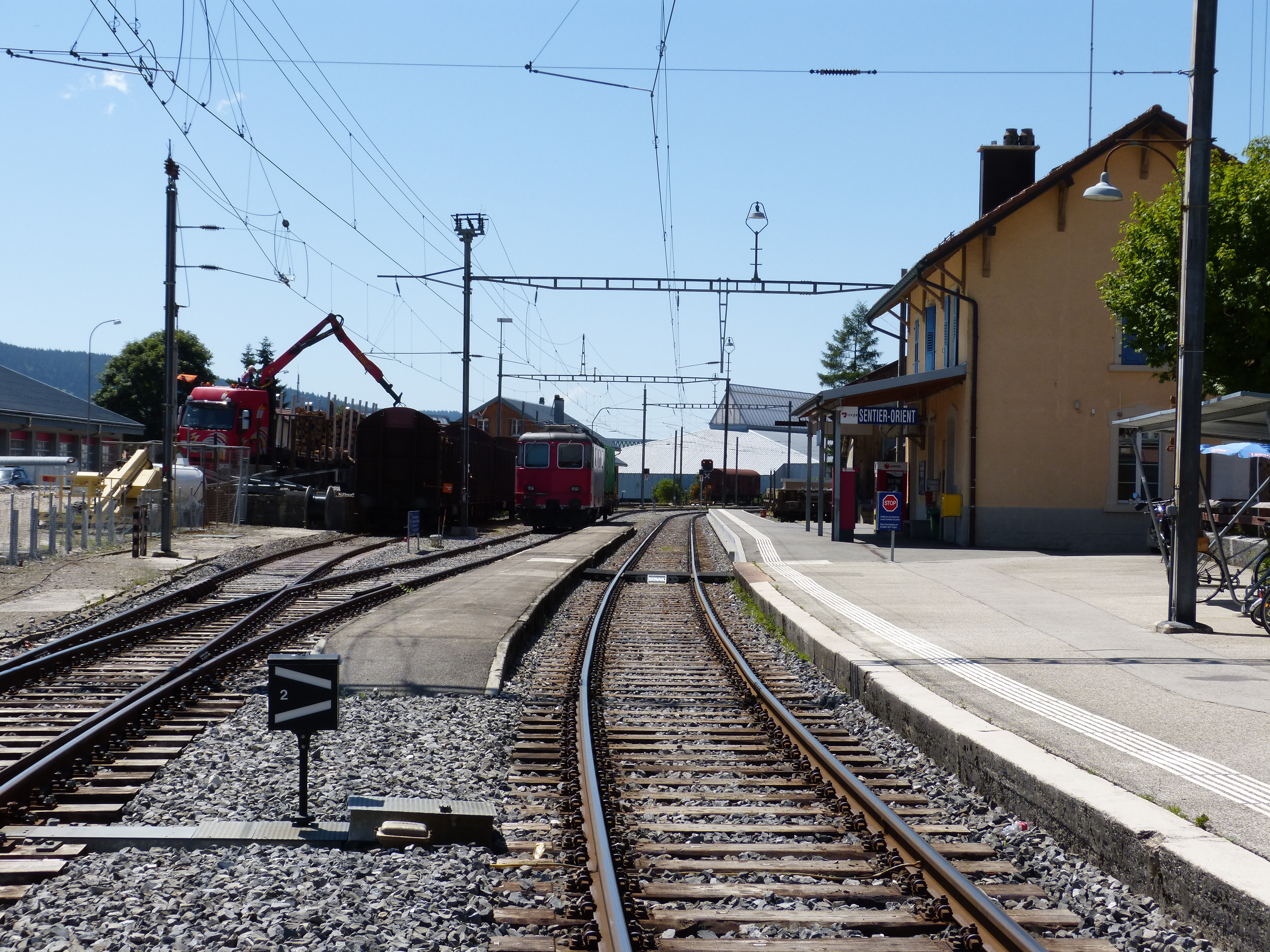
- The station in 2013

General information
- Location: Le Chenit; Switzerland
- Coordinates: 46°36′22″N 6°13′52″E
- Elevation: 1,013 m (3,323 ft)
- Owner: Travys
- Line: Vallorbe–Le Brassus line
- Distance: 21.7 km (13.5 mi) from Vallorbe
- Platforms: 1 side platform
- Tracks: 3
- Train operators: Swiss Federal Railways
- Connections: CarPostal SA bus line; Autotransports de la Vallée de Joux bus line; Travys bus line

Construction
- Accessible: Partly

Other information
- Station code: 8501157 (SEN)
- Fare zone: 118 and 119 (mobilis)

Passengers
- 2023: 620 per weekday (SBB)

Services
Preceding station	RER Vaud	Following station
Chez-le-Maître-Ecoles towards Le Brassus	R4	Le Solliat-La Golisse towards Vevey
Location

Le Sentier-L'Orient railway station (French: Gare de Le Sentier-L'Orient) is a railway station in the municipality of Le Chenit, in the Swiss canton of Vaud. It is an intermediate stop on the standard gauge Vallorbe–Le Brassus line of Swiss Federal Railways and Travys.

== Services ==
As of the December 2024 timetable change, the following services stop at Le Sentier-L'Orient:

- RER Vaud R4: hourly service between Bex and Le Brassus.
