= Le Solliat-La Golisse railway station =

Railway station in Le Chenit, Switzerland

Le Solliat-La Golisse
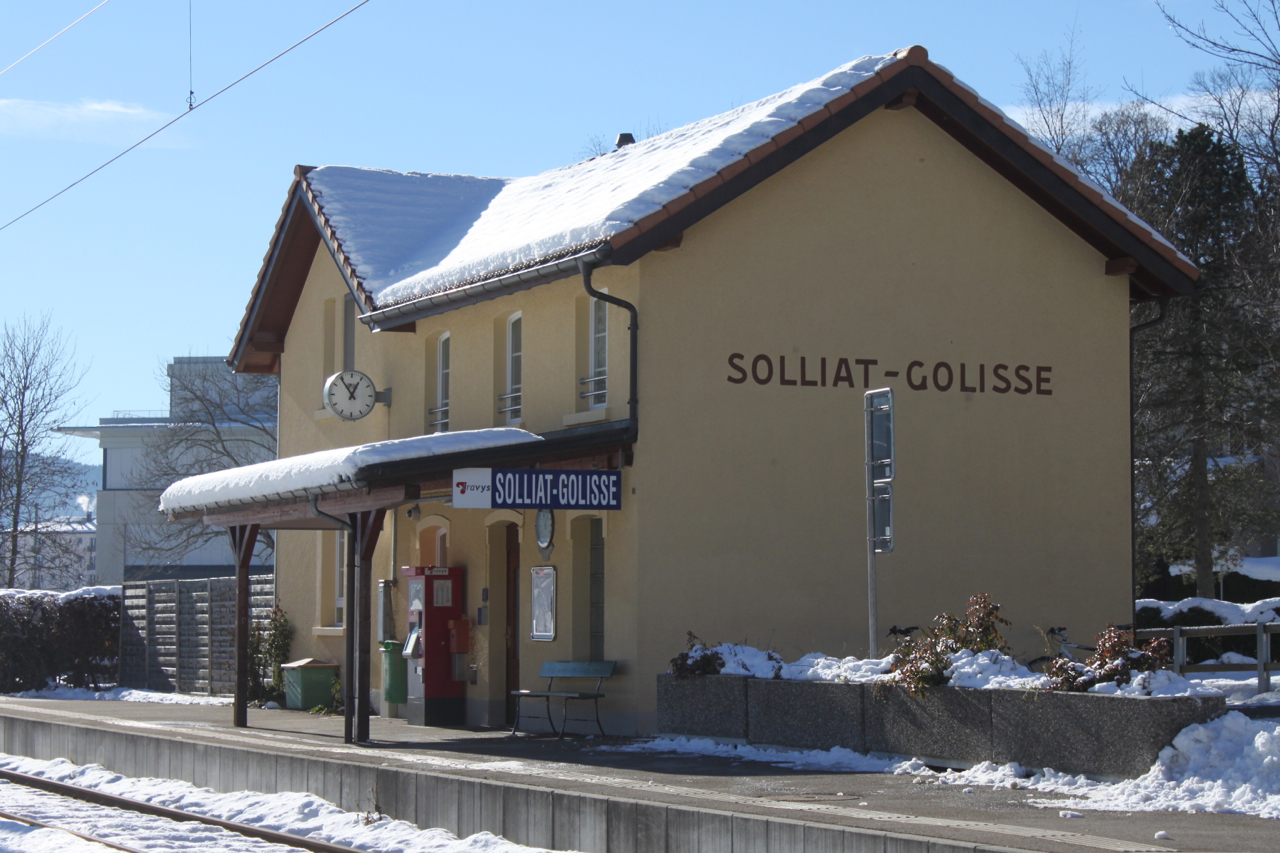
- The station in 2013

General information
- Location: Le Chenit; Switzerland
- Coordinates: 46°36′50″N 6°14′20″E
- Elevation: 1,011 m (3,317 ft)
- Owner: Travys
- Line: Vallorbe–Le Brassus line
- Distance: 20.5 km (12.7 mi) from Vallorbe
- Platforms: 1 side platform
- Tracks: 1
- Train operators: Swiss Federal Railways
- Connections: Travys bus line

Construction
- Accessible: Yes

Other information
- Station code: 8501156 (SGO)
- Fare zone: 118 (mobilis)

Passengers
- 2023: 130 per weekday (SBB)

Services
| Preceding station | RER Vaud | Following station |
|---|---|---|
| Le Sentier-L'Orient towards Le Brassus | R4 | Le Rocheray towards Vevey |
Location

Le Solliat-La Golisse railway station (French: Gare de Le Solliat-La Golisse) is a railway station in the municipality of Le Chenit, in the Swiss canton of Vaud. It is an intermediate stop and a request stop on the standard gauge Vallorbe–Le Brassus line of Swiss Federal Railways and Travys.

== Services ==
As of the December 2024 timetable change, the following services stop at Le Solliat-La Golisse:

- RER Vaud R4: hourly service between Bex and Le Brassus.
