= Les Charbonnières =

Village in Switzerland

Coordinates: 46°40′N 6°19′E

Les Charbonnières is a part of Le Lieu, a commune located in the La Vallée district of the canton of Vaud, Switzerland.

It is located on the shores of Lac Brenet.

Aerial view from 1400 m by Walter Mittelholzer (1931)
