= Le Séchey =

Part of Le Lieu, Vaud

Coordinates: 46.6598°N 6.2989°E

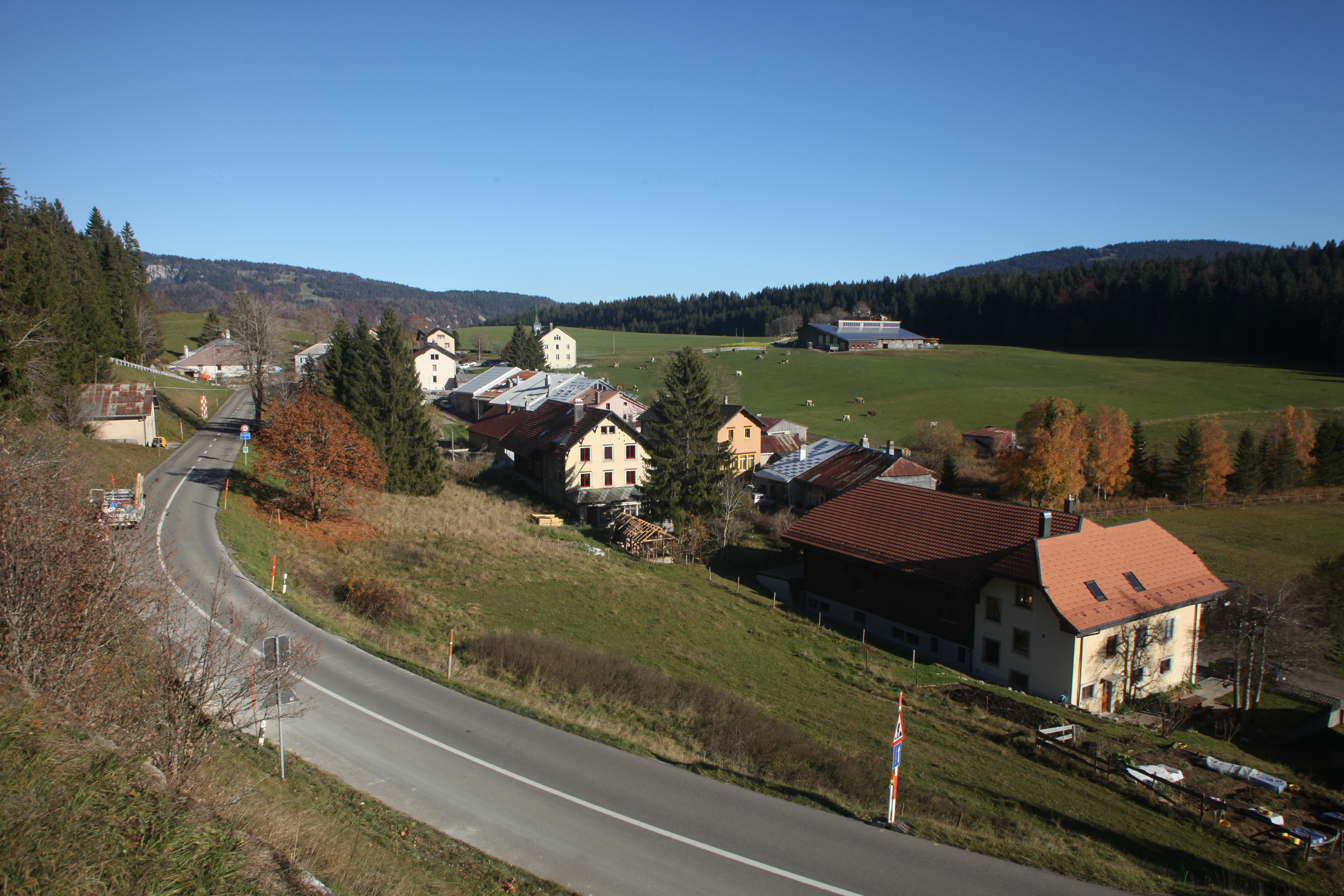
The hamlet of Séchey.

Le Séchey is a part of Le Lieu, a municipality in the La Vallée district in the canton of Vaud, Switzerland.
