= Chez-le-Maître-Ecoles railway station =

Railway station in Le Chenit, Switzerland

Chez-le-Maître-Ecoles
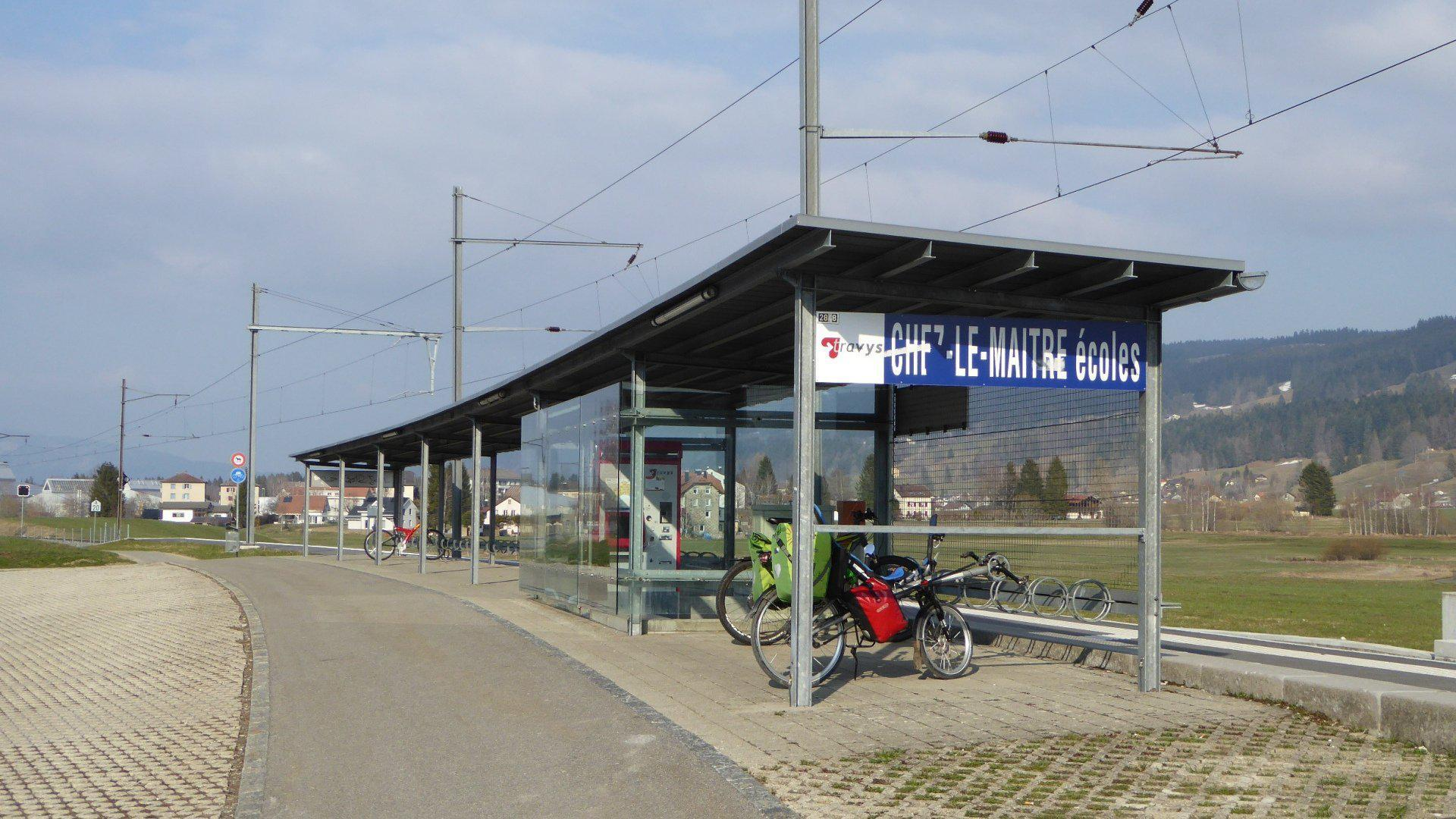
- The station in 2019

General information
- Location: Le Chenit; Switzerland
- Coordinates: 46°35′56″N 6°13′19″E
- Elevation: 1,017 m (3,337 ft)
- Owner: Travys
- Line: Vallorbe–Le Brassus line
- Distance: 22.7 km (14.1 mi) from Vallorbe
- Platforms: 1 side platform
- Tracks: 1
- Train operators: Swiss Federal Railways
- Connections: CarPostal SA bus line; Autotransports de la Vallée de Joux bus line; Travys bus line

Construction
- Accessible: Yes

Other information
- Station code: 8530783 (CLME)
- Fare zone: 119 (mobilis)

Passengers
- 2023: 420 per weekday (SBB)

Services
Preceding station	RER Vaud	Following station
Le Brassus Terminus	R4	Le Sentier-L'Orient towards Vevey
Location

Chez-le-Maître-Ecoles railway station (French: Gare de Chez-le-Maître-Ecoles) is a railway station in the municipality of Le Chenit, in the Swiss canton of Vaud. It is an intermediate stop and a request stop on the standard gauge Vallorbe–Le Brassus line of Swiss Federal Railways and Travys.

== Services ==
As of the December 2024 timetable change, the following services stop at Chez-le-Maître-Ecoles:

- RER Vaud R4: hourly service between Bex and Le Brassus.
