= Le Day railway station =

Railway station in Vallorbe, Switzerland

Le Day
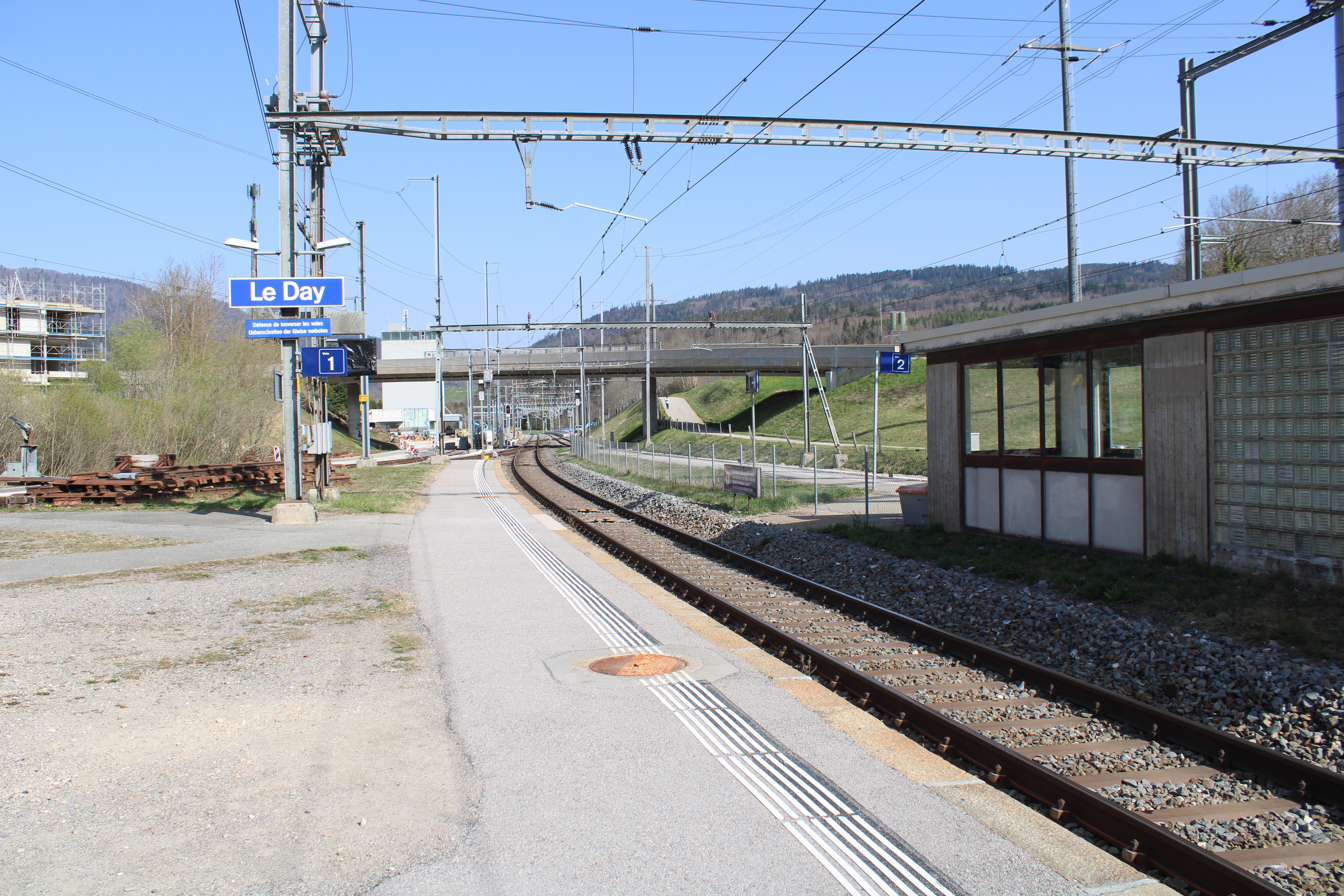
- The old station in 2022

General information
- Location: Vallorbe; Switzerland
- Coordinates: 46°43′02″N 6°24′02″E
- Elevation: 787 m (2,582 ft)
- Owner: Swiss Federal Railways
- Lines: Vallorbe–Le Brassus line; Simplon line
- Distance: 3.2 km (2.0 mi) from Vallorbe; 43.2 km (26.8 mi) from Lausanne
- Platforms: 2 (2 side platforms)
- Tracks: 2
- Train operators: Swiss Federal Railways; Travys
- Connections: Travys bus line

Construction
- Parking: Yes (20 spaces)
- Cycle facilities: Yes (14 spaces)
- Accessible: Yes

Other information
- Station code: 8501104 (DAY)
- Fare zone: 110 (mobilis)

Passengers
- 2023: 1'000 per weekday (SBB)

Services
Preceding station	RER Vaud	Following station
Vallorbe Terminus	R3	Bretonnières towards Vevey
Vallorbe Terminus	R4 Train divides	Croy-Romainmôtier towards Vevey
Le Pont towards Le Brassus	R4	Croy-Romainmôtier towards Vevey
Location

Le Day railway station (French: Gare du Day) is a railway station in the municipality of Vallorbe, in the Swiss canton of Vaud. It sits at the junction of the standard gauge Simplon line of Swiss Federal Railways and Vallorbe–Le Brassus line of SBB and Travys.

== History ==
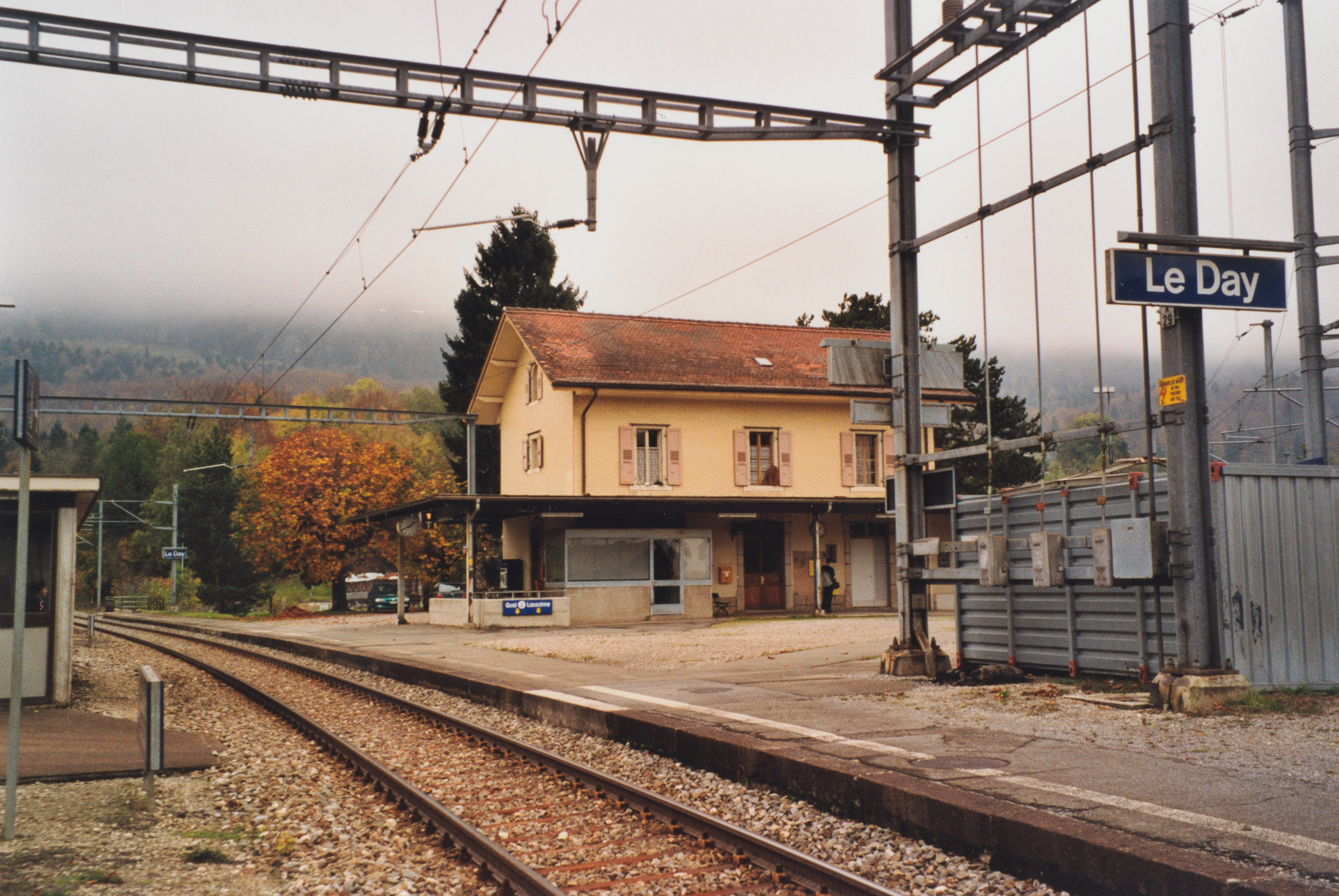
The station in 2001.

Trains from Le Pont stopped at Le Day in May 1904. Le Day railway station was built and inaugurated in 1907, becoming the second station to be located within the Vallorbe municipality. Meanwhile, the section between Le Day and Croy on the Lausanne - Vallorbe line was doubled. The work was marked by a strike in December 1904.

As part of the plan to improve services on the RER Vaud network, it was decided to upgrade the line from Cossonay-Penthalaz to Vallorbe by renewing the signalling and, above all, moving the Day station 300 metres north of the old one.

The new station, with platform lengths of 160 metres and 55 centimetres high, opened on 16 May 2022. It allows trains to reverse in order to link the Vallée de Joux line to the main line from Cossonay-Penthalaz to Vallorbe. Construction work on the new station began on 18 January 2021. Due to the COVID-19 pandemic, the start of work was delayed by eight months. Although the platforms for the new station were built in December 2021, they could not be used until 16 May 2022, when the new signalling system entered service Since 7 August 2022, it has been possible to travel between Aigle and Vallée de Joux, via Lausanne, without changing trains. The new railway station allows trains on the R4 line of RER Vaud to divide and serve Vallorbe and Vallée de Joux simultaneously every hour. These services are operated using Stadler FLIRT trains sets.

== Services ==
As of the December 2024 timetable change, the following services stop at Le Day:

- RER Vaud R3 / R4: half-hourly service to Bex; hourly (half-hourly on weekdays) service to Vallorbe and hourly service to Le Brassus; limited service to St-Maurice.
