= Le Pont railway station =

Railway station in L'Abbaye, Switzerland

Le Pont
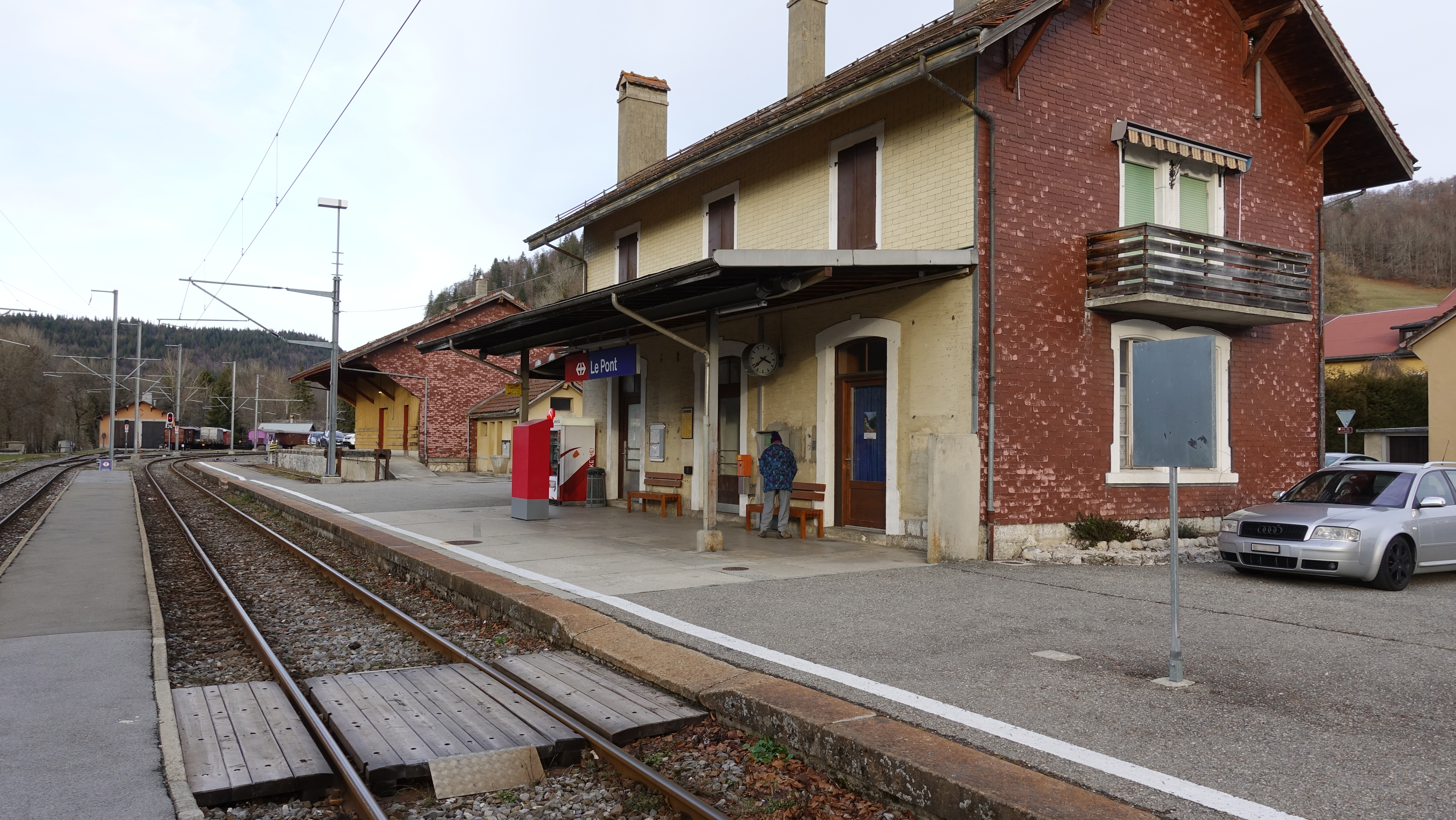
- The station in 2018

General information
- Location: L'Abbaye; Switzerland
- Coordinates: 46°40′08″N 6°19′30″E
- Elevation: 1,008 m (3,307 ft)
- Owner: Swiss Federal Railways
- Line: Vallorbe–Le Brassus line
- Distance: 11.6 km (7.2 mi) from Vallorbe
- Platforms: 2; 1 side platform; 1 island platform
- Tracks: 2
- Train operators: Swiss Federal Railways
- Connections: CarPostal SA bus line; Autotransports de la Vallée de Joux bus line; MBC bus line; Travys bus line

Construction
- Accessible: No

Other information
- Station code: 8501100 (PT)
- Fare zone: 116 (mobilis)

Passengers
- 2023: 350 per weekday (SBB)

Services
Preceding station	RER Vaud	Following station
Les Charbonnières towards Le Brassus	R4	Le Day towards Vevey
Location

Le Pont railway station (French: Gare de Le Pont) is a railway station in the municipality of L'Abbaye, in the Swiss canton of Vaud. It is an intermediate stop on the standard gauge Vallorbe–Le Brassus line of Swiss Federal Railways and Travys.

== Services ==
As of the December 2024 timetable change, the following services stop at Le Pont:

- RER Vaud: R4: hourly service between Bex and Le Brassus.
