= La Vallée District =

Coordinates: 46°37′N 6°14′E

La Vallée District District de la Vallée
- District
- Flag Coat of arms

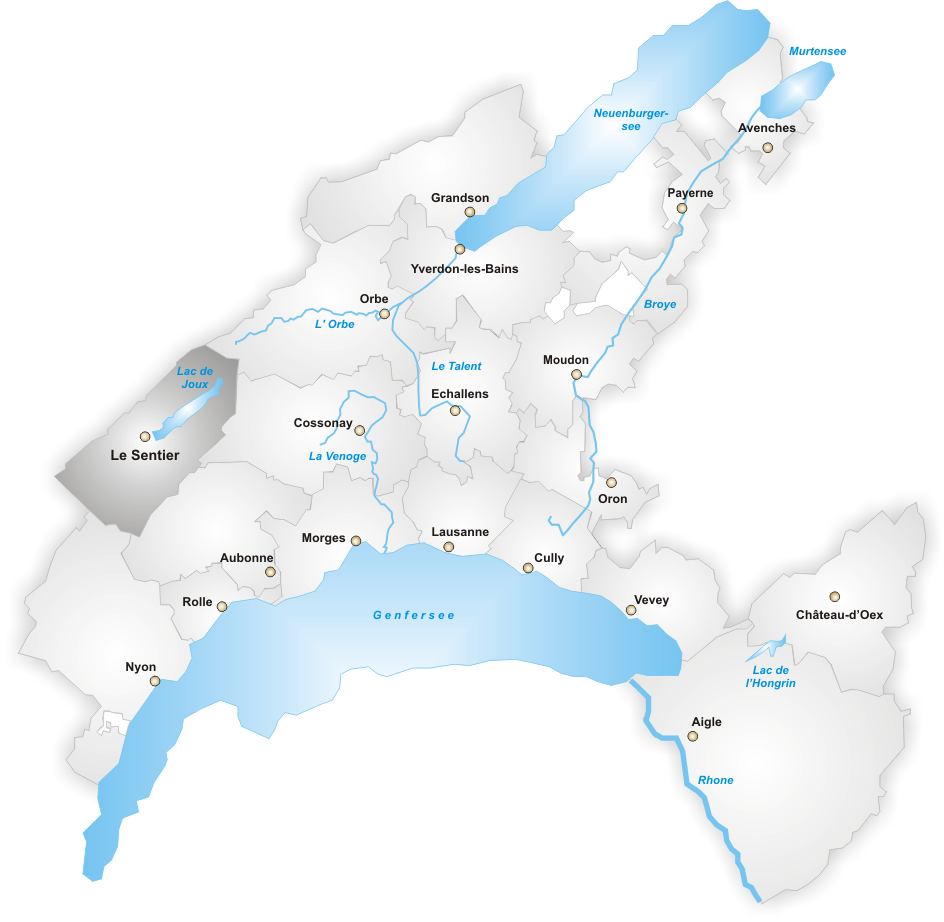
- Country: Switzerland
- Canton: Vaud
- Capital: Le Sentier (Le Chenit)

Area
  - Total: 163.61 km^{2} (63.17 sq mi)

Population (2006)
  - Total: 6,238
  - Density: 38.13/km^{2} (98.75/sq mi)
- Time zone: UTC+1 (CET)
  - Summer (DST): UTC+2 (CEST)
- Municipalities: 3

La Vallée is a former district of the canton of Vaud, Switzerland, consisting of three municipalities in the Vallée de Joux. The seat of the district was Le Sentier in Le Chenit. La Vallée has been merged into Jura-North Vaudois District.

The following municipalities are located within the district:

- L'Abbaye
- Le Chenit
- Le Lieu

The following villages are in the district:

- Le Brassus
- Le Sentier
- Le Solliat
- Derrière-la-Côte
- L'Orient
- L'Abbaye
- Les Bioux
- Le Pont
- Le Lieu
- Les Charbonnières
- Le Sechey
