= Le Lieu =

- Municipality
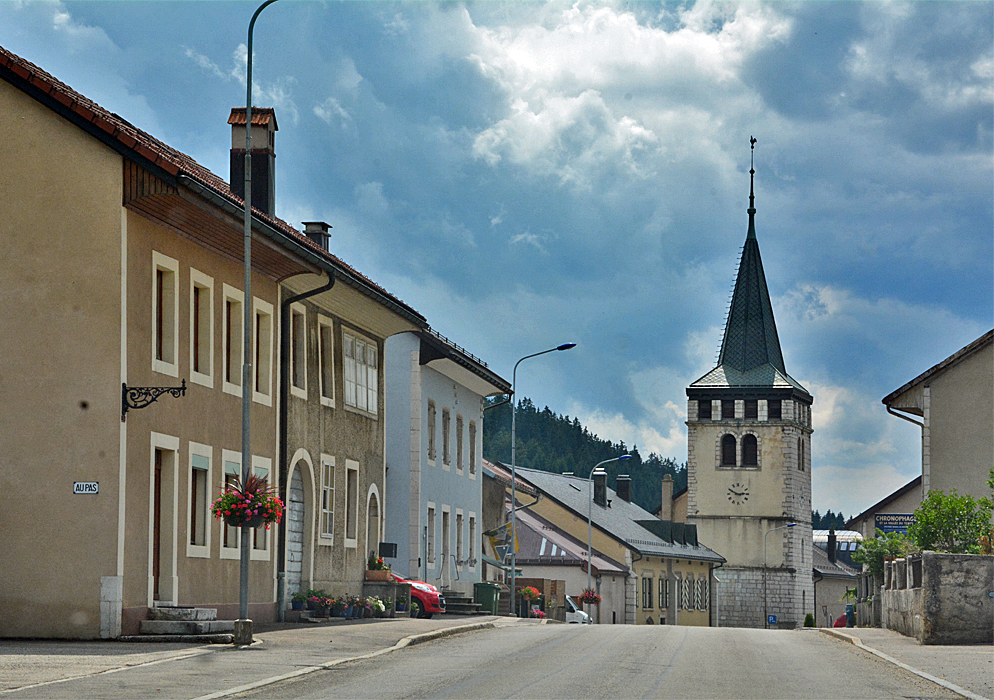

- Flag Coat of arms
- Location of Le Lieu
- Location within Switzerland Location within Canton of Vaud
- Coordinates: 46°39′N 06°17′E
- Country: Switzerland
- Canton: Vaud
- District: Jura-Nord Vaudois

Government
  - Mayor: Syndic

Area
  - Total: 32.55 km^{2} (12.57 sq mi)
- Elevation: 1,043 m (3,422 ft)

Population (2003)
  - Total: 823
  - Density: 25.3/km^{2} (65.5/sq mi)
- Time zone: UTC+01:00 (CET)
  - Summer (DST): UTC+02:00 (CEST)
- Postal codes: 1345 Le Lieu; 1343 Les Charbonnières
- SFOS number: 5873
- ISO 3166 code: CH-VD
- Surrounded by: L'Abbaye, Le Chenit, Les Villedieu (FR-25), Mouthe (FR-25), Rochejean (FR-25), Sarrageois (FR-25), Vallorbe
- Website: www.lelieu.ch

Le Lieu is a municipality in the canton of Vaud in Switzerland, located in the district of Jura-Nord Vaudois in the Vallée de Joux.

== History ==
Le Lieu is first mentioned in 1155 as loco dompni Poncii heremite ("in the place of lord Poncius the hermit"). In 1408 it was mentioned as le Lieu Poncet. The village of Les Charbonnières was first mentioned in 1489 and Le Séchey village was first mentioned in 1489.

== Geography ==
Aerial view (1964)

Le Lieu has an area, as of 2009, of 32.55 square kilometers (12.57 sq mi). Of this area, 11.12 km^{2} (4.29 sq mi) or 34.2% is used for agricultural purposes, while 19.5 km^{2} (7.5 sq mi) or 59.9% is forested. Of the rest of the land, 1.08 km^{2} (0.42 sq mi) or 3.3% is settled (buildings or roads), 0.44 km^{2} (0.17 sq mi) or 1.4% is either rivers or lakes and 0.38 km^{2} (0.15 sq mi) or 1.2% is unproductive land.

Of the built up area, housing and buildings made up 1.2% and transportation infrastructure made up 1.9%. Out of the forested land, 56.4% of the total land area is heavily forested and 3.5% is covered with orchards or small clusters of trees. Of the agricultural land, 0.0% is used for growing crops and 11.8% is pastures and 22.3% is used for alpine pastures. All the water in the municipality is in lakes.

The municipality was part of the La Vallée District until it was dissolved on 31 August 2006, and Le Lieu became part of the new district of Jura-Nord Vaudois.

The municipality is located on the eastern shore of Lac de Joux. It consists of the villages of Le Lieu, Les Charbonnières and Le Séchey as well as multiple hamlets.

== Coat of arms ==
The blazon of the municipal coat of arms is Or, a Bar Azure, overall Saint Poncet bearded Argent, garmented Sable, holding a staff of the same in dexter and a Bible of the third.

== Demographics ==
Le Lieu has a population (as of December 2020) of 887. As of 2008, 12.5% of the population are resident foreign nationals. Over the last 10 years (1999–2009 ) the population has changed at a rate of 4.4%. It has changed at a rate of 5.1% due to migration and at a rate of -0.8% due to births and deaths.

Most of the population (as of 2000) speaks French (703 or 88.4%), with German being second most common (28 or 3.5%) and Italian being third (20 or 2.5%).

Of the population in the municipality 263 or about 33.1% were born in Le Lieu and lived there in 2000. There were 251 or 31.6% who were born in the same canton, while 119 or 15.0% were born somewhere else in Switzerland, and 136 or 17.1% were born outside of Switzerland.

In 2008 there were 4 live births to Swiss citizens and were 9 deaths of Swiss citizens. Ignoring immigration and emigration, the population of Swiss citizens decreased by 5 while the foreign population remained the same. There were 3 Swiss men and 1 Swiss woman who immigrated back to Switzerland. At the same time, there were 4 non-Swiss men who immigrated from another country to Switzerland and 2 non-Swiss women who emigrated from Switzerland to another country. The total Swiss population change in 2008 (from all sources, including moves across municipal borders) was a decrease of 2 and the non-Swiss population decreased by 11 people. This represents a population growth rate of -1.6%.

The age distribution, as of 2009, in Le Lieu is; 76 children or 9.1% of the population are between 0 and 9 years old and 95 teenagers or 11.4% are between 10 and 19. Of the adult population, 85 people or 10.2% of the population are between 20 and 29 years old. 105 people or 12.6% are between 30 and 39, 103 people or 12.4% are between 40 and 49, and 118 people or 14.2% are between 50 and 59. The senior population distribution is 106 people or 12.7% of the population are between 60 and 69 years old, 76 people or 9.1% are between 70 and 79, there are 63 people or 7.6% who are between 80 and 89, and there are 6 people or 0.7% who are 90 and older.

As of 2000, there were 301 people who were single and never married in the municipality. There were 383 married individuals, 65 widows or widowers and 46 individuals who are divorced.

As of 2000, there were 349 private households in the municipality, and an average of 2.2 persons per household. There were 125 households that consist of only one person and 25 households with five or more people. Out of a total of 361 households that answered this question, 34.6% were households made up of just one person and there were 4 adults who lived with their parents. Of the rest of the households, there are 109 married couples without children, 90 married couples with children There were 16 single parents with a child or children. There were 5 households that were made up of unrelated people and 12 households that were made up of some sort of institution or another collective housing.

In 2000 there were 186 single family homes (or 58.1% of the total) out of a total of 320 inhabited buildings. There were 62 multi-family buildings (19.4%), along with 49 multi-purpose buildings that were mostly used for housing (15.3%) and 23 other use buildings (commercial or industrial) that also had some housing (7.2%). Of the single family homes 65 were built before 1919, while 6 were built between 1990 and 2000. The most multi-family homes (31) were built before 1919 and the next most (10) were built between 1946 and 1960.

In 2000 there were 501 apartments in the municipality. The most common apartment size was 3 rooms of which there were 138. There were 22 single room apartments and 142 apartments with five or more rooms. Of these apartments, a total of 335 apartments (66.9% of the total) were permanently occupied, while 139 apartments (27.7%) were seasonally occupied and 27 apartments (5.4%) were empty. As of 2009, the construction rate of new housing units was 4.8 new units per 1000 residents. The vacancy rate for the municipality, in 2010, was 0%.

The historical population is given in the following chart:

== Sights ==
The entire village of Le Lieu and ISOS village: Le Séchey is designated as part of the Inventory of Swiss Heritage Sites.

== Politics ==
In the 2007 federal election the most popular party was the SP which received 28.8% of the vote. The next three most popular parties were the SVP (17.85%), the Green Party (16.21%) and the LPS Party (13.71%). In the federal election, a total of 285 votes were cast, and the voter turnout was 45.2%.

== Economy ==
As of 2010, Le Lieu had an unemployment rate of 5.9%. As of 2008, there were 42 people employed in the primary economic sector and about 16 businesses involved in this sector. 635 people were employed in the secondary sector and there were 18 businesses in this sector. 73 people were employed in the tertiary sector, with 19 businesses in this sector. There were 368 residents of the municipality who were employed in some capacity, of which females made up 40.5% of the workforce.

In 2008 the total number of full-time equivalent jobs was 696. The number of jobs in the primary sector was 35, of which 28 were in agriculture, 5 were in forestry or lumber production and 1 was in fishing or fisheries. The number of jobs in the secondary sector was 605 of which 584 or (96.5%) were in manufacturing and 22 (3.6%) were in construction. The number of jobs in the tertiary sector was 56. In the tertiary sector; 4 or 7.1% were in wholesale or retail sales or the repair of motor vehicles, 1 was in the movement and storage of goods, 20 or 35.7% were in a hotel or restaurant, 1 was the insurance or financial industry, 1 was a technical professional or scientist, 21 or 37.5% were in education and 3 or 5.4% were in health care.

In 2000, there were 767 workers who commuted into the municipality and 184 workers who commuted away. The municipality is a net importer of workers, with about 4.2 workers entering the municipality for every one leaving. About 38.3% of the workforce coming into Le Lieu are coming from outside Switzerland. Of the working population, 8.2% used public transportation to get to work, and 57.6% used a private car.

== Religion ==
From the 2000 census, 180 or 22.6% were Roman Catholic, while 411 or 51.7% belonged to the Swiss Reformed Church. Of the rest of the population, there were 2 members of an Orthodox church (or about 0.25% of the population), and there were 38 individuals (or about 4.78% of the population) who belonged to another Christian church. There were 21 (or about 2.64% of the population) who were Islamic. There were 4 individuals who belonged to another church. 118 (or about 14.84% of the population) belonged to no church, are agnostic or atheist, and 40 individuals (or about 5.03% of the population) did not answer the question.

== Education ==
In Le Lieu about 275 or (34.6%) of the population have completed non-mandatory upper secondary education, and 90 or (11.3%) have completed additional higher education (either university or a Fachhochschule). Of the 90 who completed tertiary schooling, 66.7% were Swiss men, 26.7% were Swiss women.

In the 2009/2010 school year there were a total of 87 students in the Le Lieu school district. In the Vaud cantonal school system, two years of non-obligatory pre-school are provided by the political districts. During the school year, the political district provided pre-school care for a total of 578 children of which 359 children (62.1%) received subsidized pre-school care. The canton's primary school program requires students to attend for four years. There were 46 students in the municipal primary school program. The obligatory lower secondary school program lasts for six years and there were 41 students in those schools.

As of 2000, there were 29 students in Le Lieu who came from another municipality, while 67 residents attended schools outside the municipality.

== Companies ==
- Vacherin Mont d'Or, Rochat family Les Charbonnières
- Dubois Depraz SA - watch making and micromecanics
- Eaton
- Valtronic - microelectronic assembly
