= Vallorbe–Le Brassus railway line =

Railway line in Switzerland

Vallorbe–Le Brassus
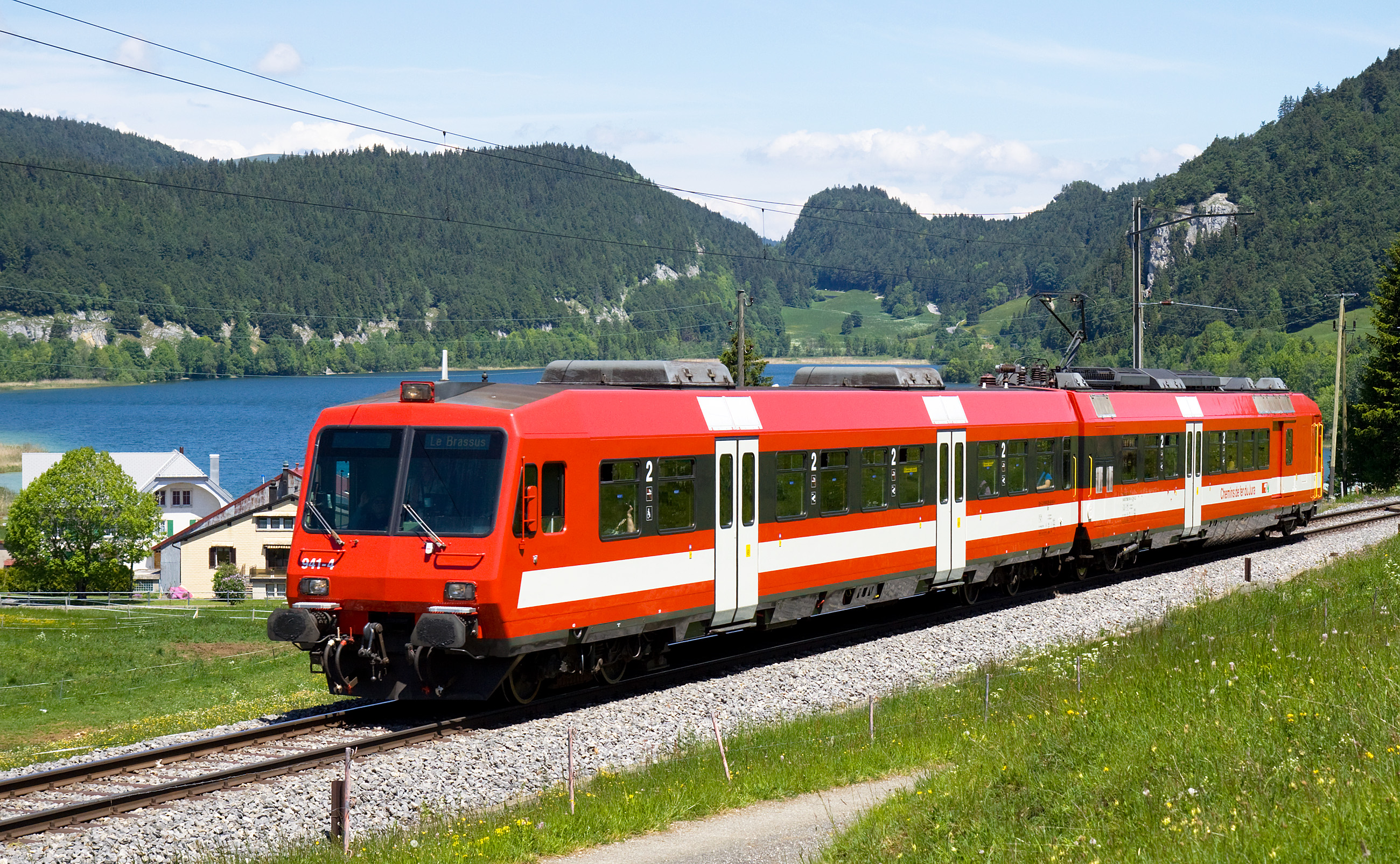
- A southbound train near Les Charbonnières in 2009; Lac Brenet is in the background

Overview
- Owner: Swiss Federal Railways (Vallorbe–Le Pont); Travys (Le Pont–Le Brassus)
- Line number: 201
- Termini: Vallorbe; Le Brassus
- Stations: 11

Service
- Operator(s): Travys

History
- Opened: 31 October 1886

Technical
- Line length: 24.4 km (15.2 mi)
- Track gauge: 1,435 mm (4 ft 8 1/2 in) standard gauge
- Electrification: 15 kV/16.7 Hz AC overhead catenary

The Vallorbe–Le Brassus railway line is a standard gauge railway line in southwestern Switzerland. It runs from Vallorbe to Le Brassus via Le Day and Le Pont. It shares the section between Vallorbe and Le Day with the Simplon line. Originally built by the Pont–Vallorbe Railway and Pont–Brassus Railway between 1886 and 1899, it is now owned by Swiss Federal Railways and Travys, with Travys operating passenger services over the entire route.

== History ==
The Pont–Vallorbe Railway (French: Chemin de fer Pont–Vallorbe) opened the line between Vallorbe and Le Pont on 31 October 1886. Jura–Simplon Railways acquired the Pont–Vallorbe Railway on 1 January 1891. The Pont–Brassus Railway (French: Chemin de fer Pont–Brassus) extended the line southwest from Le Pont to Le Brassus; the extension opened on 21 August 1899. Jura–Simplon Railways was one of several Swiss companies nationalized in 1902, becoming part of Swiss Federal Railways. The Pont–Brassus Railway was not included, and remained independent until merging with the Yverdon–Ste-Croix Railway in 2001 to form Travys.

The line was electrified at 15 kV/16.7 Hz AC on 2 October 1938.
