= Le Brassus railway station =

Railway station in Le Chenit, Switzerland

Le Brassus
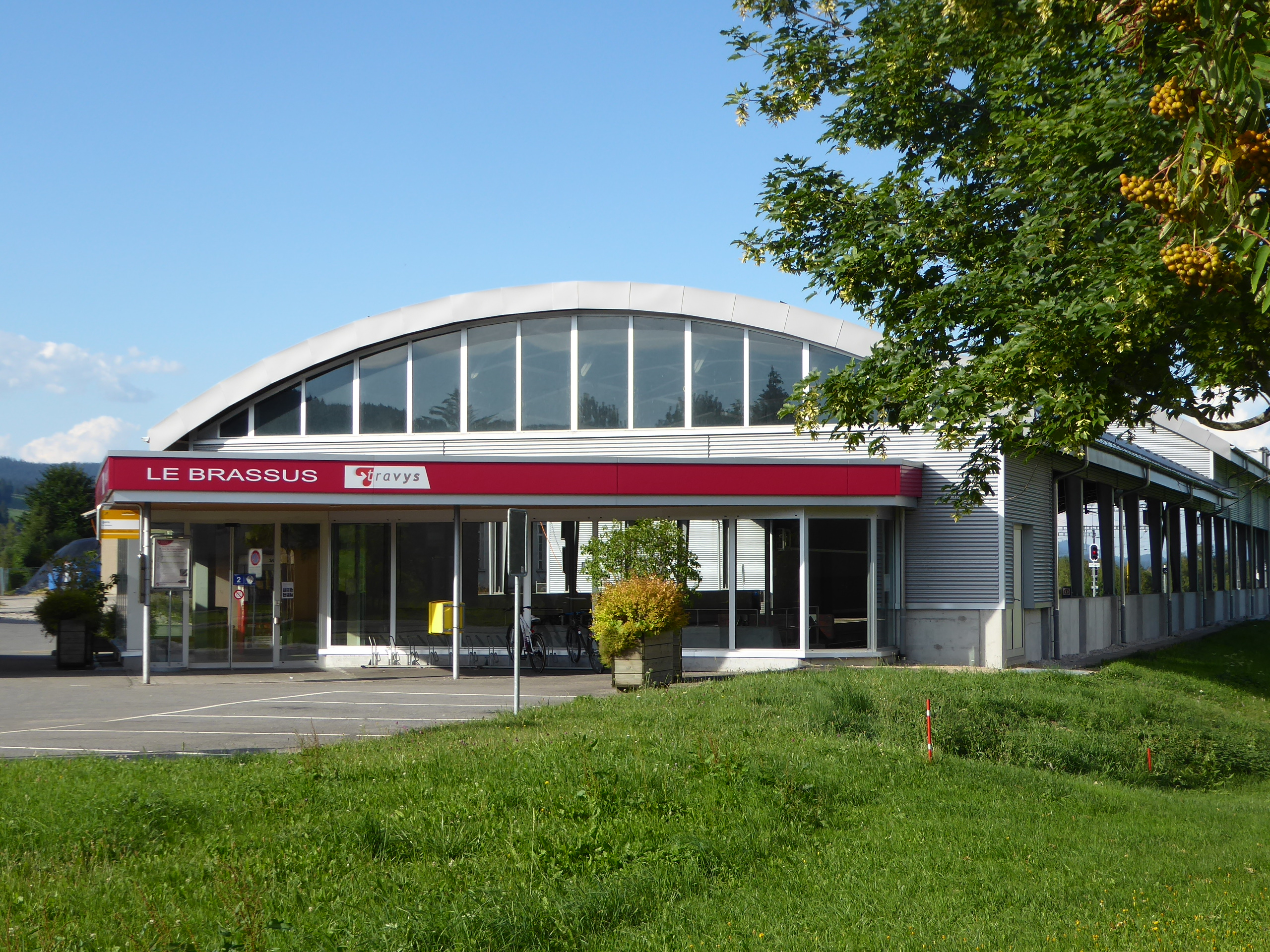
- The station in 2018

General information
- Location: Le Chenit; Switzerland
- Coordinates: 46°35′10″N 6°12′50″E
- Elevation: 1,022 m (3,353 ft)
- Owner: Travys
- Line: Vallorbe–Le Brassus line
- Distance: 22.4 km (13.9 mi) from Vallorbe
- Platforms: 2 side platforms
- Tracks: 2
- Train operators: Swiss Federal Railways
- Connections: CarPostal SA bus line; Travys bus line

Construction
- Accessible: Yes

Other information
- Station code: 8501159 (BRA)
- Fare zone: 119 (mobilis)

Passengers
- 2023: 350 per weekday (SBB)

Services
Preceding station	RER Vaud	Following station
Terminus	R4	Chez-le-Maître-Ecoles towards Vevey
Location

Le Brassus railway station (French: Gare du Brassus) is a railway station in the municipality of Le Chenit, in the Swiss canton of Vaud. It is the western terminus on the standard gauge Vallorbe–Le Brassus line of Swiss Federal Railways and Travys.

== Services ==
As of the December 2024 timetable change, the following services stop at Le Brassus:

- RER Vaud R4: hourly service to Bex.
