= Cressier railway station =

Cressier railway station may refer to:

- Cressier FR railway station in Cressier, Fribourg, Switzerland
- Cressier NE railway station in Cressier, Neuchâtel, Switzerland
