= Ligerz Tunnel =

Planned railway tunnel in Switzerland

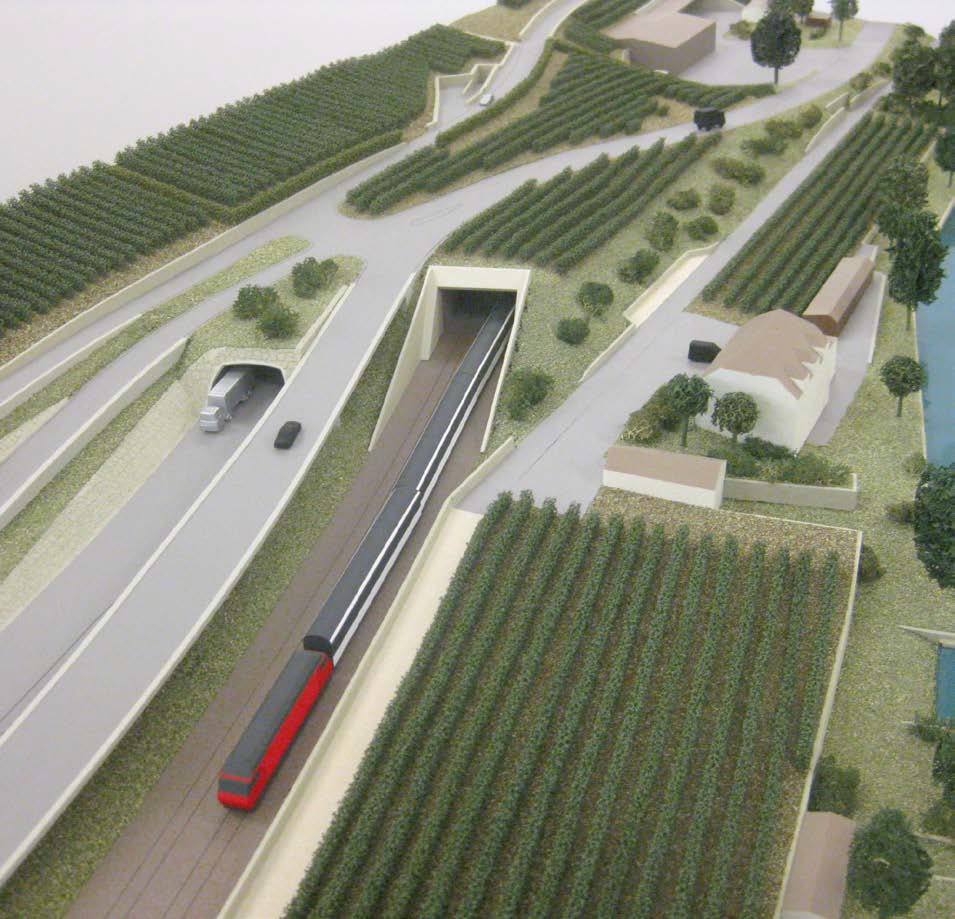
- Model of the future tunnel
- Interactive map of Ligerz Tunnel

Overview
- Line: Jura Foot Line

Operation
- Opens: December 2029

Technical
- Length: 2.13 kilometres (1.32 mi)
- Track gauge: 1,435 mm (4 ft 8 1/2 in)

The Ligerz Tunnel (French: Tunnel de Gléresse) is a railway tunnel under construction at the southern foot of the Jura Railway line in Switzerland. The last single-track section of the southern Jura line is to be eliminated by the double-track tunnel. This bottleneck between the service stations at Chavannes (German: Schafis) and Twann (French: Douanne) on the Biel–Neuchâtel route is currently limiting the frequency of rail traffic. The planned costs amount to 431 million Swiss francs ($470M).

The tunnel is part of the STEP 2030 project and will enable a continuous half-hourly service on the line, without impacting freight traffic. Initially planned to be completed by 2026, the project was delayed by litigation over the public tender process as well as environmental concerns. As of 2026 it is estimated to be commissioned by the end of 2029.

It will run parallel to the existing road tunnel of Motorway number 5, which forms the Ligerz bypass, and share its evacuation tunnel.

After the commissioning of the new tunnel, the existing single-track railway running on the lake side will be removed. As of December 2024, the Ligerz railway station has been closed and a Postbus line between the village of Ligerz and Twann has been created. This line is extended to La Neuveville during off-peak hours.

In parallel, the Twann station has been modernized between 2022 and 2024, improving accessibility and creating a stop for the bus to Ligerz.

The construction of the Ligerz Tunnel will be financed by the new Railway Infrastructure Fund (RIF), which Swiss voters accepted on February 9, 2014, with the FABI proposal.
