= Le Landeron railway station =

Railway station in Le Landeron, Switzerland

Le Landeron
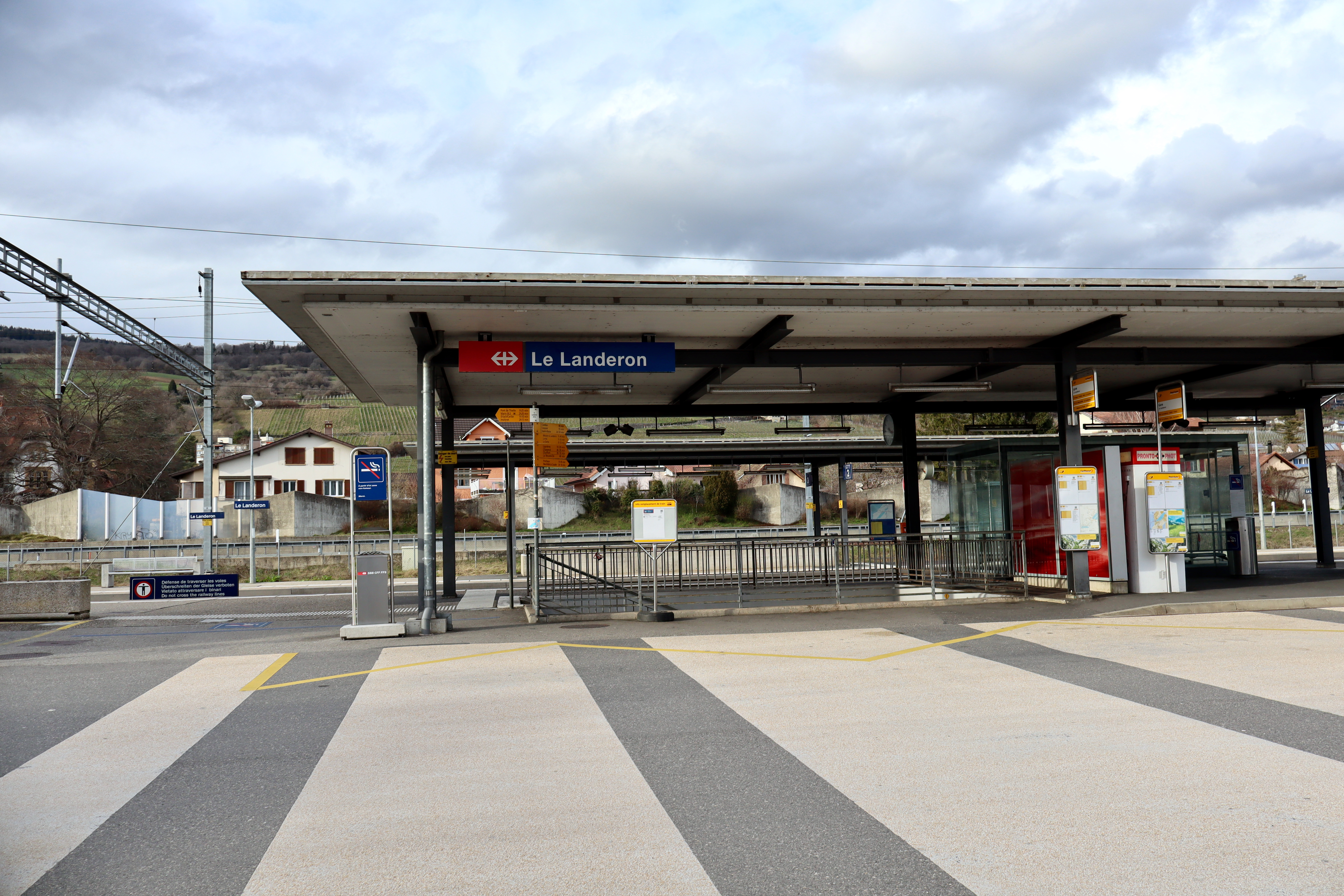
- The station in 2024

General information
- Location: Le Landeron; Switzerland
- Coordinates: 47°03′24″N 7°03′59″E
- Elevation: 437 m (1,434 ft)
- Owner: Swiss Federal Railways
- Line: Jura Foot line
- Distance: 87.7 km (54.5 mi) from Lausanne
- Platforms: 2
- Tracks: 3
- Train operators: Swiss Federal Railways
- Connections: CarPostal SA bus lines

Construction
- Parking: Yes (30 spaces)
- Cycle facilities: Yes (27 spaces)
- Accessible: No

Other information
- Station code: 8504225 (LD)
- Fare zone: 14 and 95 (Onde Verte); 314 (Libero)

Passengers
- 2023: 1'300 per weekday (SBB)

Services
Preceding station	SBB CFF FFS	Following station
Cressier NE towards Yverdon-les-Bains	R13	La Neuveville towards Biel/Bienne
Cressier NE towards Neuchâtel	R16	La Neuveville towards Biel/Bienne
Location
- Location within Switzerland Location within Canton of Neuchâtel

Le Landeron railway station (French: Gare de Le Landeron) is a railway station in the municipality of Le Landeron, in the Swiss canton of Neuchâtel. It is an intermediate stop on the standard gauge Jura Foot line of Swiss Federal Railways.

== Services ==
As of the December 2024 timetable change, the following services stop at Le Landeron:

- Regio:
  - hourly service between Biel/Bienne and Yverdon-les-Bains.
  - hourly service between Biel/Bienne and Neuchâtel at various times during the day.
