= Eclépens railway station =

Railway station in Eclépens, Switzerland

Eclépens
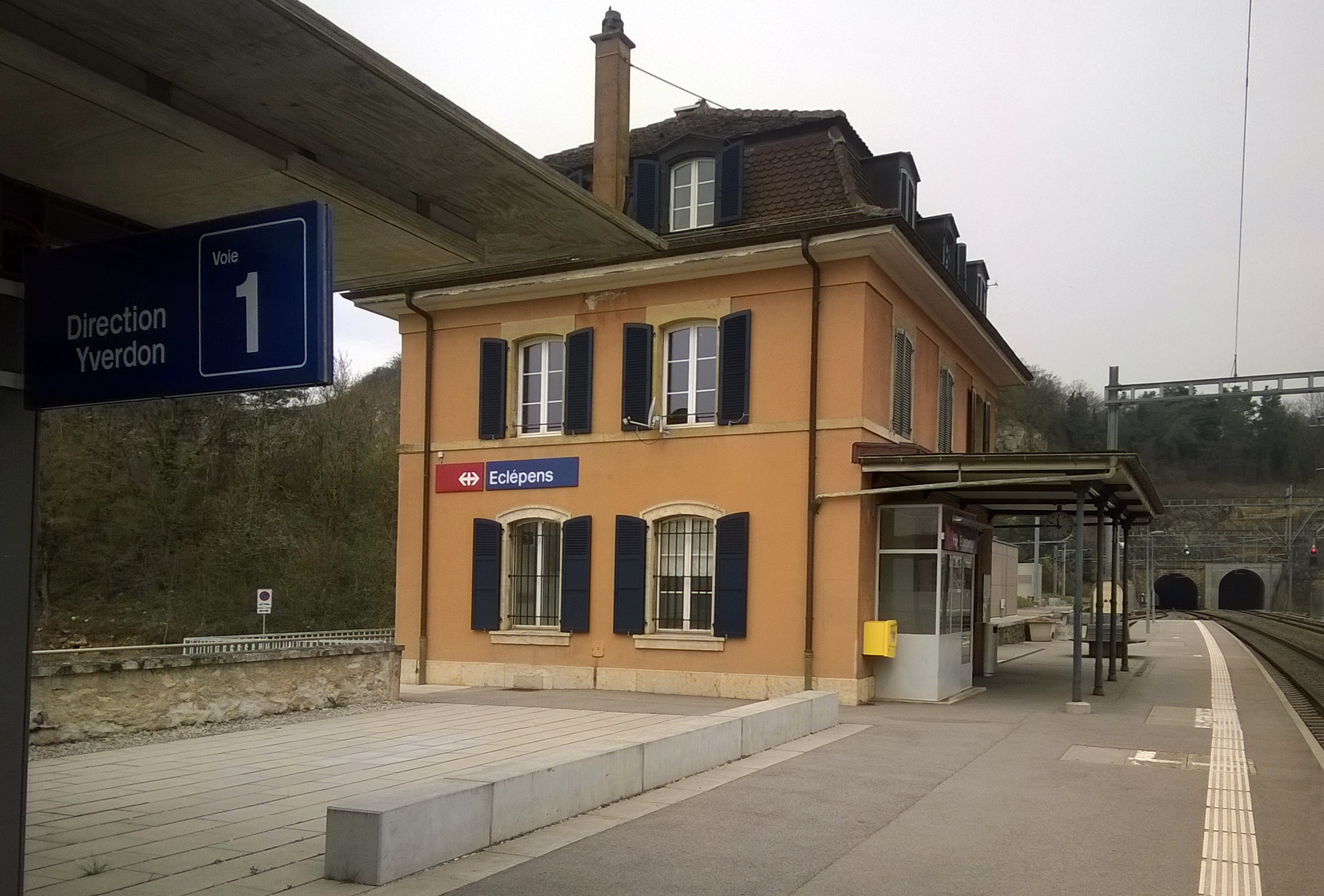
- The station building in 2018

General information
- Location: Eclépens; Switzerland
- Coordinates: 46°39′26″N 6°33′09″E
- Elevation: 454 m (1,490 ft)
- Owner: Swiss Federal Railways
- Line: Jura Foot line
- Distance: 21.4 km (13.3 mi) from Lausanne
- Platforms: 2 (2 side platform)
- Tracks: 2
- Train operators: Swiss Federal Railways
- Connections: CarPostal SA bus line

Construction
- Parking: Yes (16 spaces)
- Cycle facilities: Yes (13 spaces)
- Accessible: Partly

Other information
- Station code: 8501114 (ECL)
- Fare zone: 53 (mobilis)

Passengers
- 2023: 290 per weekday (SBB)

Services
Preceding station	RER Vaud	Following station
Bavois towards Grandson	R1	Cossonay-Penthalaz towards Bex
Bavois towards Grandson	R2	Cossonay-Penthalaz towards Bex
Location

Eclépens railway station (French: Gare de Eclépens) is a railway station in the municipality of Eclépens, in the Swiss canton of Vaud. It is an intermediate stop on the standard gauge Jura Foot line of Swiss Federal Railways.

== Services ==
As of the December 2024 timetable change, the following services stop at Eclépens:

- RER Vaud R1 / R2: half-hourly service between Grandson and Cully.
