= Cornaux NE railway station =

Railway station in Cornaux, Neuchâtel, Switzerland

Cornaux NE
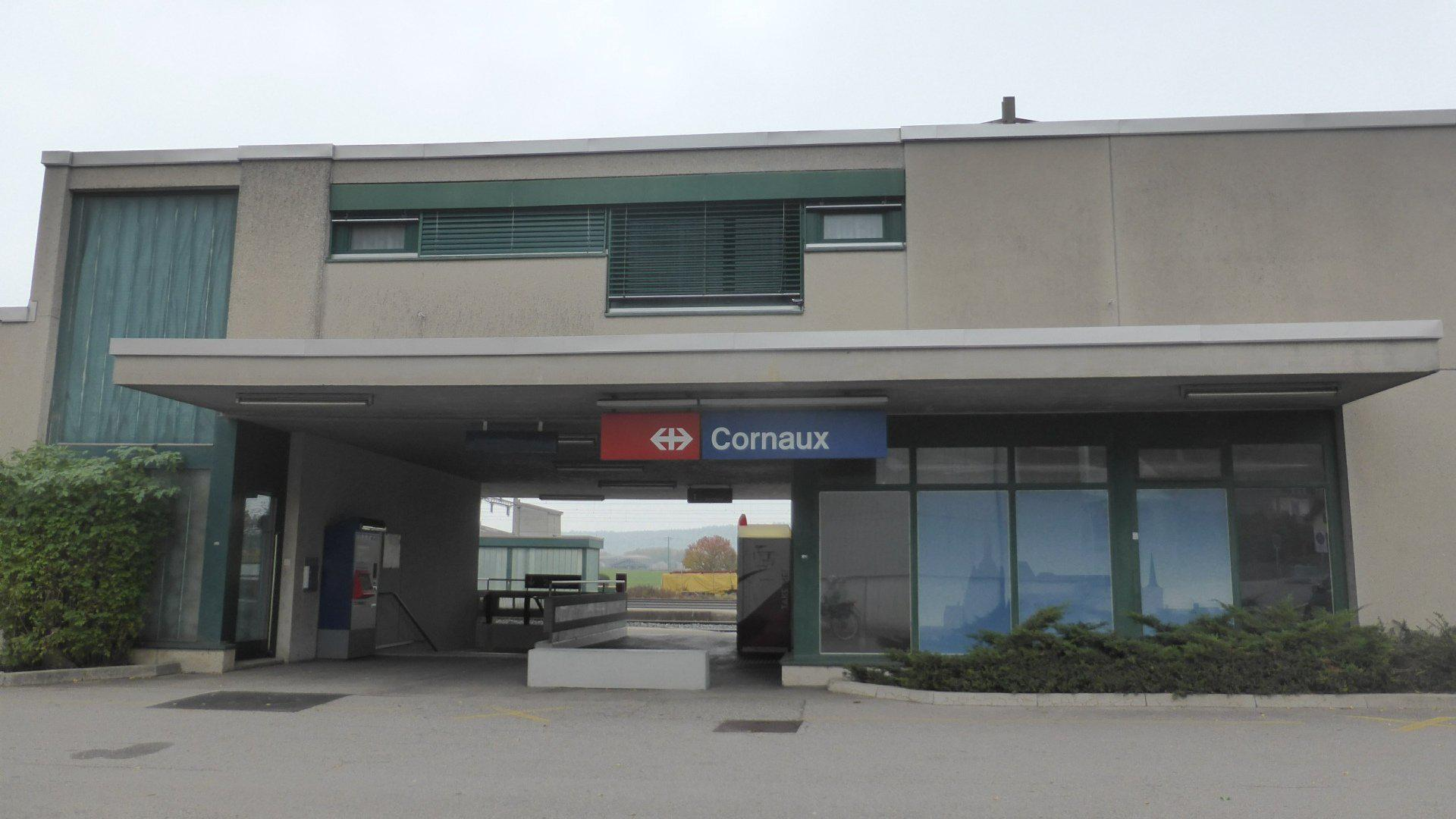
- The station building in 2018

General information
- Location: Cornaux; Switzerland
- Coordinates: 47°02′19″N 7°01′24″E
- Elevation: 435 m (1,427 ft)
- Owner: Swiss Federal Railways
- Line: Jura Foot line
- Distance: 83.6 km (51.9 mi) from Lausanne
- Platforms: 2 side platforms
- Tracks: 2
- Train operators: Swiss Federal Railways
- Connections: CarPostal SA bus line

Construction
- Parking: Yes (12 spaces)
- Cycle facilities: Yes (27 spaces)
- Accessible: No

Other information
- Station code: 8504223 (CORN)
- Fare zone: 11 (Onde Verte)

Passengers
- 2023: 620 per weekday (SBB)

Services
Preceding station	SBB CFF FFS	Following station
St-Blaise CFF towards Yverdon-les-Bains	R13	Cressier NE towards Biel/Bienne
St-Blaise CFF towards Neuchâtel	R16	Cressier NE towards Biel/Bienne
Location
- Location within Switzerland Location within Canton of Neuchâtel

Cornaux NE railway station (French: Gare de Cornaux NE) is a railway station in the municipality of Cornaux, in the Swiss canton of Neuchâtel. It is an intermediate stop on the standard gauge Jura Foot line of Swiss Federal Railways.

== Services ==
As of the December 2024 timetable change, the following services stop at Cornaux NE:

- Regio:
  - hourly service between Biel/Bienne and Yverdon-les-Bains.
  - hourly service between Biel/Bienne and Neuchâtel at various times during the day.
