= Tüscherz railway station =

Railway station in Twann-Tüscherz, Switzerland

Tüscherz
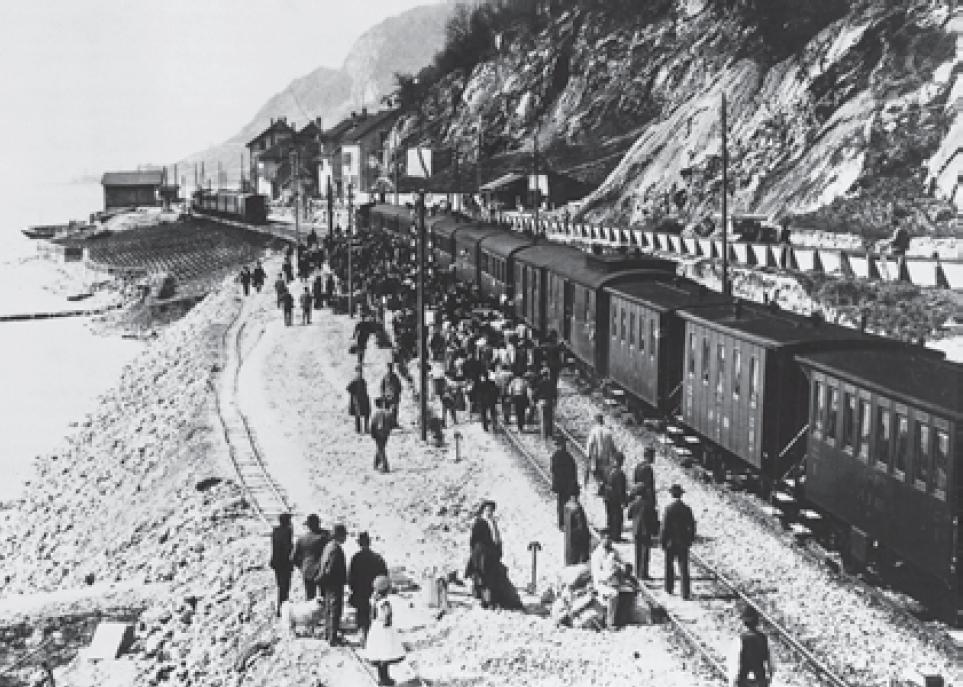
- Tüscherz station in 1900

General information
- Location: Twann-Tüscherz; Switzerland
- Coordinates: 47°06′54″N 7°11′50″E
- Elevation: 434 m (1,424 ft)
- Owner: Swiss Federal Railways
- Line: Jura Foot line
- Distance: 100.0 km (62.1 mi) from Lausanne
- Platforms: 2 side platforms
- Tracks: 2
- Train operators: Swiss Federal Railways

Construction
- Cycle facilities: Yes (8 spaces)
- Accessible: No

Other information
- Station code: 8504229 (TUE)
- Fare zone: 301 (Libero)

Passengers
- 2023: 100 per weekday (SBB)

Services
Preceding station	SBB CFF FFS	Following station
Twann towards Yverdon-les-Bains	R13	Biel/Bienne Terminus
Twann towards Neuchâtel	R16	Biel/Bienne Terminus
Location

Tüscherz railway station (German: Bahnhof Tüscherz) is a railway station in the municipality of Twann-Tüscherz, in the Swiss canton of Bern. It is an intermediate stop on the standard gauge Jura Foot line of Swiss Federal Railways.

== Services ==
As of the December 2024 timetable change, the following services stop at Tüscherz:

- Regio:
  - hourly service between Biel/Bienne and Yverdon-les-Bains.
  - hourly service between Biel/Bienne and Neuchâtel at various times during the day.
