= Twann railway station =

Railway station in Twann-Tüscherz, Switzerland

Twann
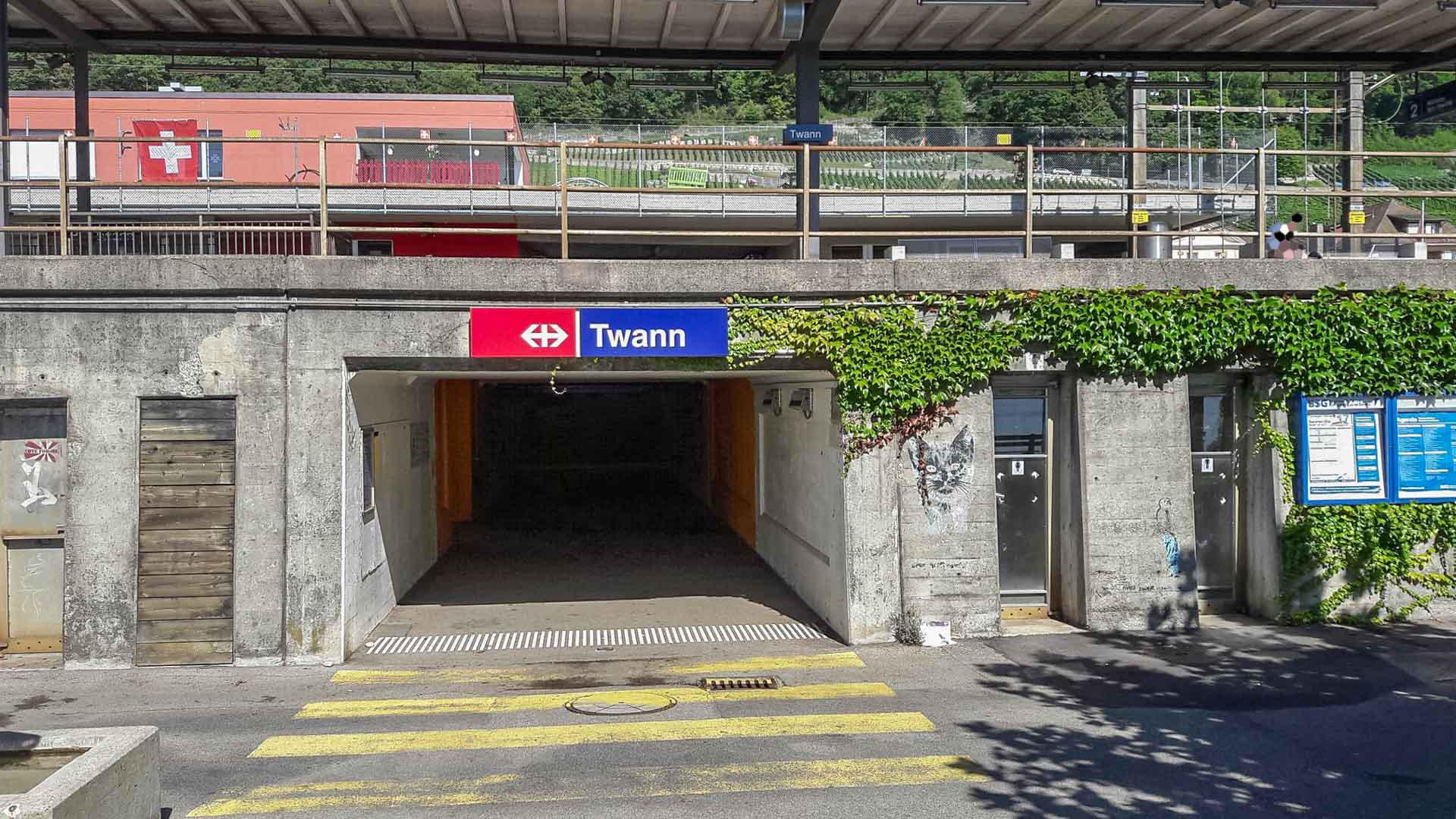
- The station platforms in 2018

General information
- Location: Twann-Tüscherz; Switzerland
- Coordinates: 47°05′37″N 7°09′23″E
- Elevation: 433 m (1,421 ft)
- Owner: Swiss Federal Railways
- Line: Jura Foot line
- Distance: 96.0 km (59.7 mi) from Lausanne
- Platforms: 2 side platforms
- Tracks: 2
- Train operators: Swiss Federal Railways
- Connections: PostAuto AG bus lines

Construction
- Cycle facilities: Yes (36 spaces)
- Accessible: Yes

Other information
- Station code: 8504228 (TWN)
- Fare zone: 315 (Libero)

Passengers
- 2023: 420 per weekday (SBB)

Services
Preceding station	SBB CFF FFS	Following station
La Neuveville towards Yverdon-les-Bains	R13	Tüscherz towards Biel/Bienne
La Neuveville towards Neuchâtel	R16	Tüscherz towards Biel/Bienne
Location

Twann railway station (German: Bahnhof Twann, French: Gare de Douanne) is a railway station in the municipality of Twann-Tüscherz, in the Swiss canton of Bern. It is an intermediate stop on the standard gauge Jura Foot line of Swiss Federal Railways.

The station has been modernized between 2022 and 2024, improving accessibility and creating a stop for the Postbus line to the village of Ligerz and La Neuveville. To allow for the commissioning of the Ligerz Tunnel (estimated 2029), the station building will be partially demolished and the station plaza rebuilt.

== Services ==
As of the December 2024 timetable change, the following services stop at Twann:

- Regio:
  - hourly service between Biel/Bienne and Yverdon-les-Bains.
  - hourly service between Biel/Bienne and Neuchâtel at various times during the day.
