= Cressier NE railway station =

Railway station in Cressier, Neuchâtel, Switzerland

Cressier NE
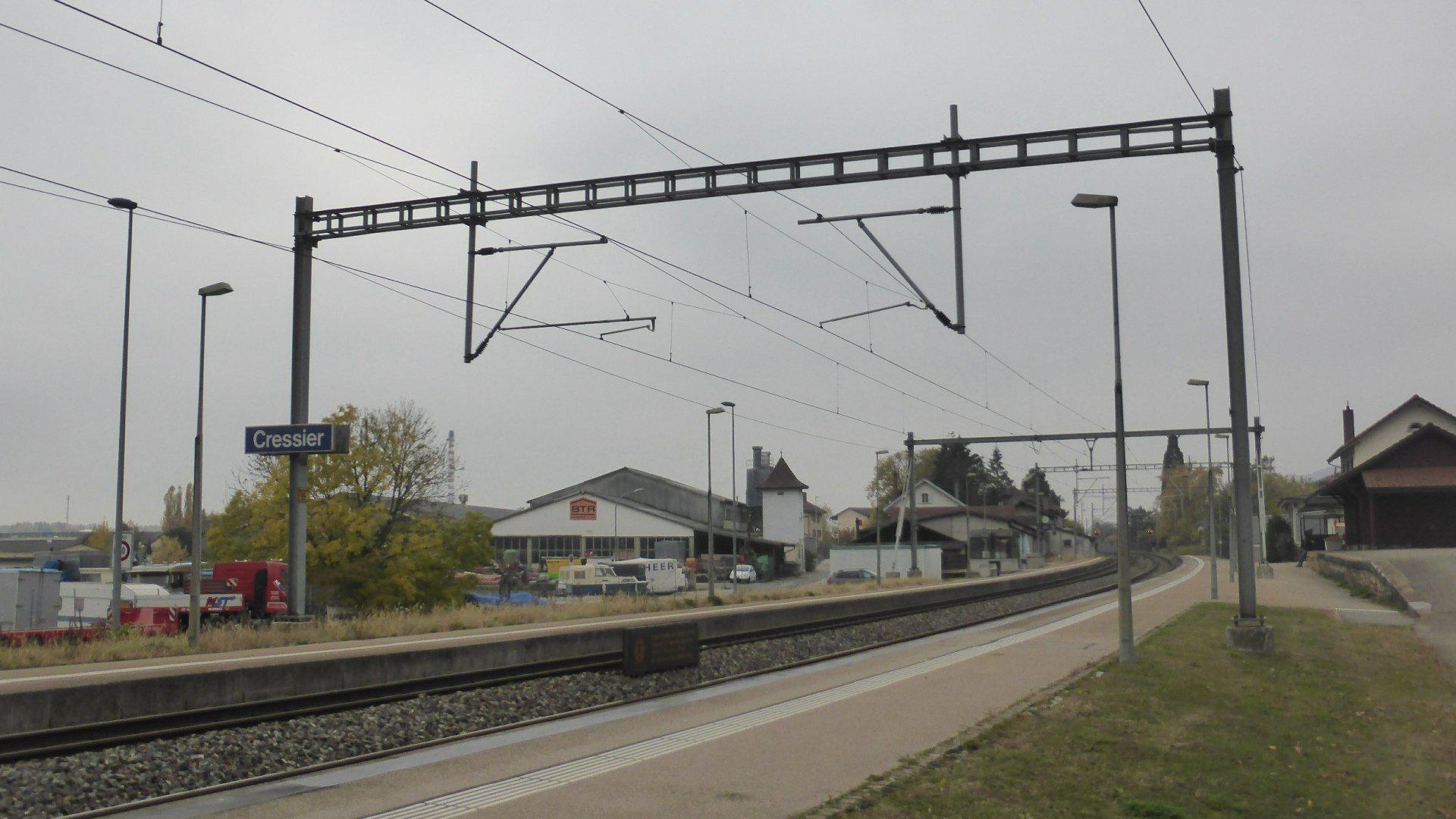
- The station in 2018

General information
- Location: Cressier; Switzerland
- Coordinates: 47°03′07″N 7°02′22″E
- Elevation: 435 m (1,427 ft)
- Owner: Swiss Federal Railways
- Line: Jura Foot line
- Distance: 85.6 km (53.2 mi) from Lausanne
- Platforms: 2 side platforms
- Tracks: 2
- Train operators: Swiss Federal Railways
- Connections: CarPostal SA bus line

Construction
- Parking: Yes (15 spaces)
- Cycle facilities: Yes (9 spaces)
- Accessible: No

Other information
- Station code: 8504224 (CRNE)
- Fare zone: 14 (Onde Verte)

Passengers
- 2023: 490 per weekday (SBB)

Services
Preceding station	SBB CFF FFS	Following station
Cornaux NE towards Yverdon-les-Bains	R13	Le Landeron towards Biel/Bienne
Cornaux NE towards Neuchâtel	R16	Le Landeron towards Biel/Bienne
Location
- Location within Switzerland Location within Canton of Neuchâtel

Cressier NE railway station (French: Gare de Cressier NE) is a railway station in the municipality of Cressier, in the Swiss canton of Neuchâtel. It is an intermediate stop on the standard gauge Jura Foot line of Swiss Federal Railways.

== Services ==
As of the December 2024 timetable change, the following services stop at Cressier NE:

- Regio:
  - hourly service between Biel/Bienne and Yverdon-les-Bains.
  - hourly service between Biel/Bienne and Neuchâtel at various times during the day.
