= La Neuveville railway station =

Railway station in La Neuveville, Switzerland

La Neuveville
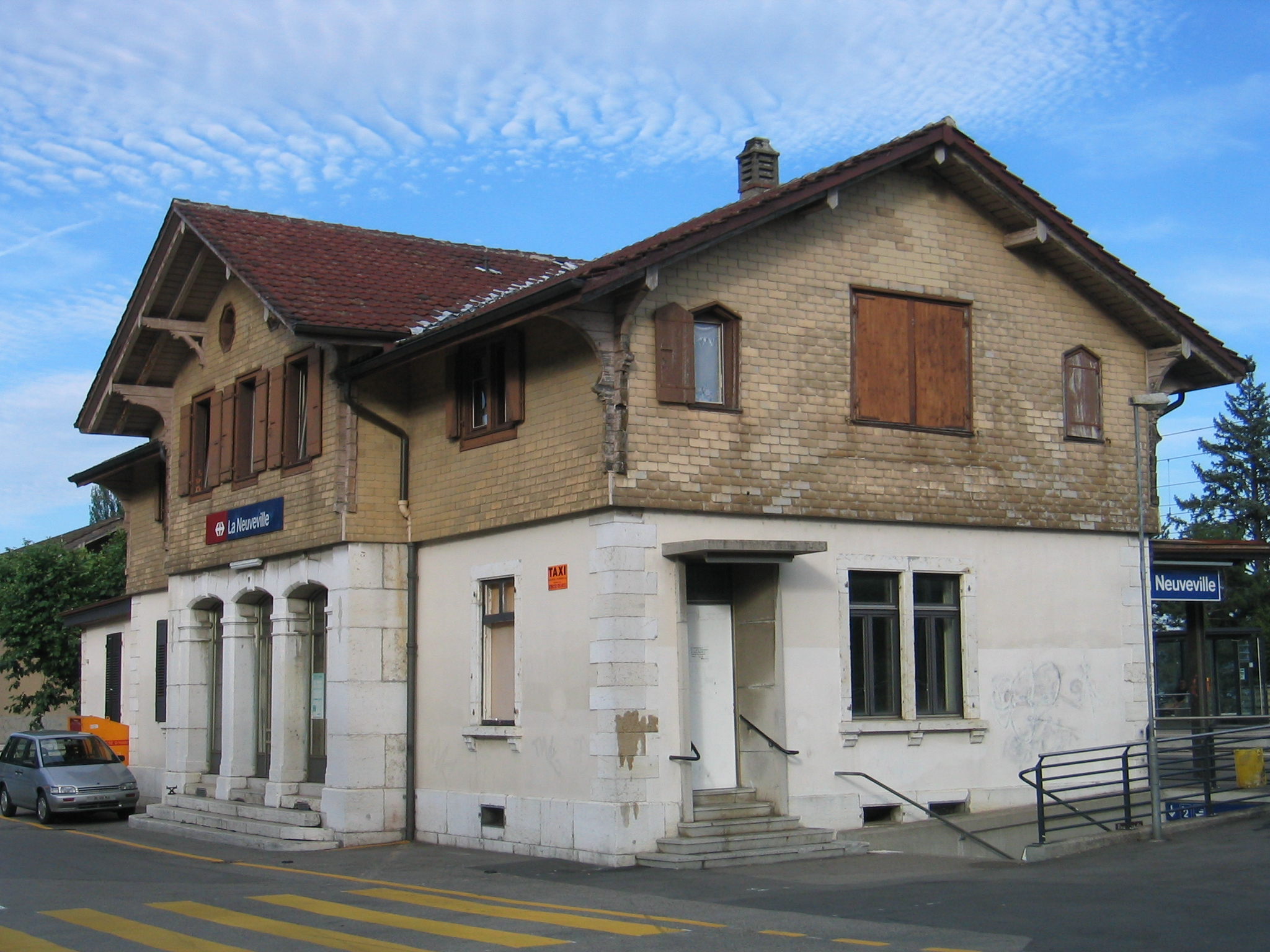
- The station building in 2003

General information
- Location: La Neuveville; Switzerland
- Coordinates: 47°03′46″N 7°05′43″E
- Elevation: 433 m (1,421 ft)
- Owner: Swiss Federal Railways
- Line: Jura Foot line
- Distance: 90.1 km (56.0 mi) from Lausanne
- Platforms: 2 side platforms
- Tracks: 2
- Train operators: Swiss Federal Railways
- Connections: BSG ferries on Lake Biel; PostAuto AG/CarPostal SA buses

Construction
- Parking: Yes (12 spaces)
- Accessible: Yes

Other information
- Station code: 8504226 (NV)
- Fare zone: 314 (Libero)

Passengers
- 2023: 1'500 per weekday (SBB)

Services
| Preceding station | SBB CFF FFS | Following station |
|---|---|---|
| Le Landeron towards Yverdon-les-Bains | R13 | Twann towards Biel/Bienne |
| Le Landeron towards Neuchâtel | R16 | Twann towards Biel/Bienne |
Location

La Neuveville railway station (French: Gare de La Neuveville) is a railway station in the municipality of La Neuveville, in the Swiss canton of Bern. It is an intermediate stop on the standard gauge Jura Foot line of Swiss Federal Railways.

== Services ==
As of the December 2024 timetable change, the following services stop at La Neuveville:

- Regio:
  - hourly service between Biel/Bienne and Yverdon-les-Bains.
  - hourly service between Biel/Bienne and Neuchâtel at various times during the day.
