= Broc-Village railway station =

Railway station in Broc, Switzerland

Broc-Village
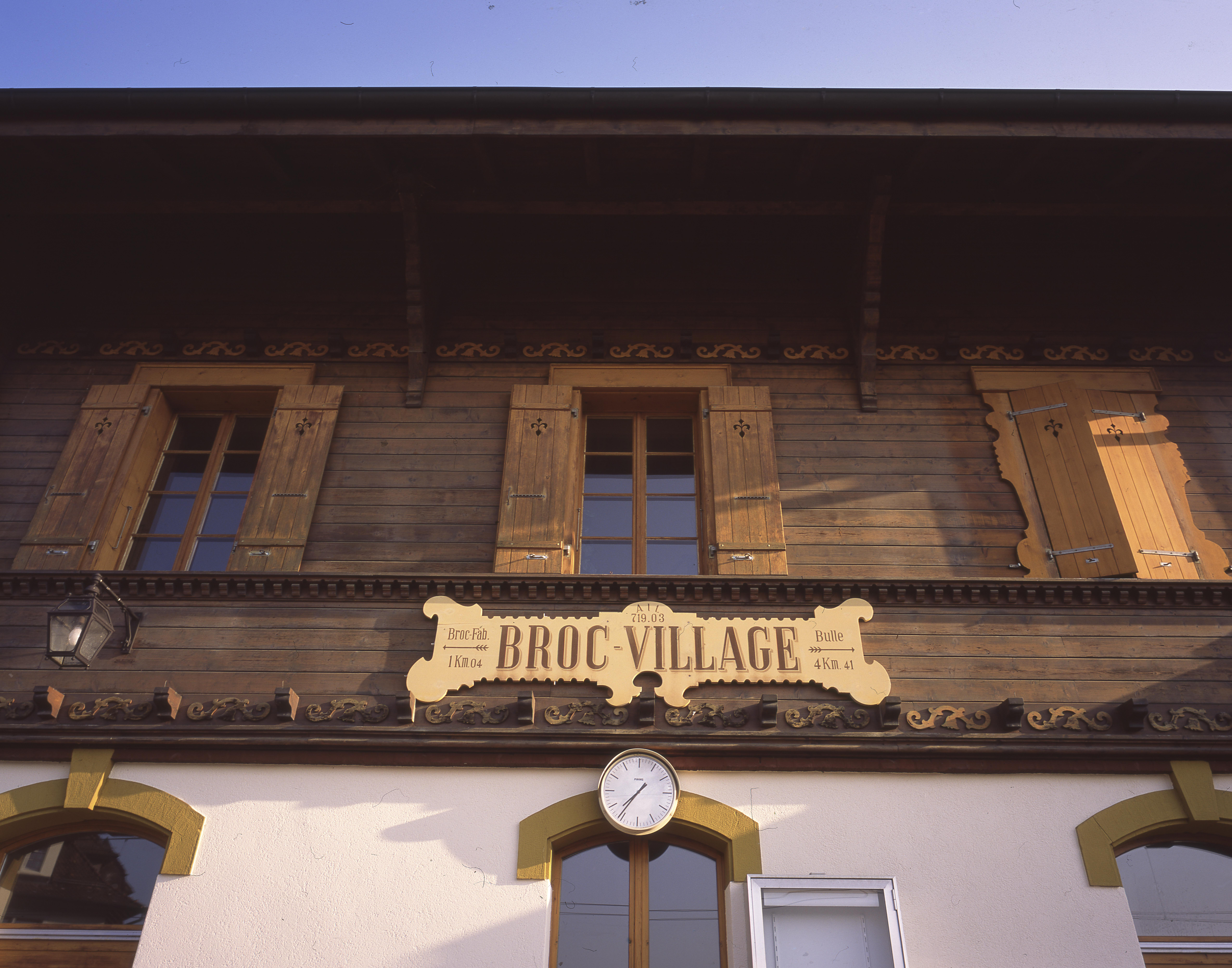
- The station building in 2014

General information
- Location: Broc, Fribourg; Switzerland
- Coordinates: 46°36′14″N 7°05′56″E
- Elevation: 719 m (2,359 ft)
- Owner: Transports publics Fribourgeois
- Line: Bulle–Broc railway line
- Distance: 4.4 km (2.7 mi) from Bulle
- Platforms: 1 (1 side platform)
- Tracks: 1
- Train operators: Transports publics Fribourgeois
- Connections: TPF

Construction
- Parking: Yes (6 spaces)
- Accessible: Yes

Other information
- Station code: 8504088 (BROV)
- Fare zone: 31 (frimobil)

History
- Opened: 24 June 1912

Services
Preceding station	RER Fribourg	Following station
La Tour-de-Trême towards Bern	RE2	Broc-Chocolaterie Terminus
La Tour-de-Trême towards Düdingen	RE3	Broc-Chocolaterie Terminus
Location

Broc-Village railway station (French: Gare de Broc-Village), is a railway station in the municipality of Broc, in the Swiss canton of Fribourg. It is one of two stations in Broc. The other, Broc-Chocolaterie, is located next to the Cailler chocolate factory. It is an intermediate stop on the standard gauge Bulle–Broc railway line of Transports publics Fribourgeois.

== History ==
The Chemins de fer électriques de la Gruyère constructed the Bulle–Broc railway line in 1912. Broc-Village opened on 24 June. The line was built as a 1,000 mm (3 ft 3 3/8 in) metre gauge line. The line and station were closed between April 2021 and December 2023 for rebuilding as a 1,435 mm (4 ft 8 1/2 in) standard gauge line. This permitted direct operation to via Fribourg/Freiburg to Bern. The line fully reopened on 24 August 2023. As part of the project the station was rebuilt to be accessible, with a new 150 metres (490 ft) platform.

== Services ==
As of the December 2024 timetable change, the following services stop at Broc-Village:

- RER Fribourg RE2 / RE3: half-hourly service to Düdingen and Broc-Chocolaterie and hourly service to Bern.
