= Chénens =

- Municipality
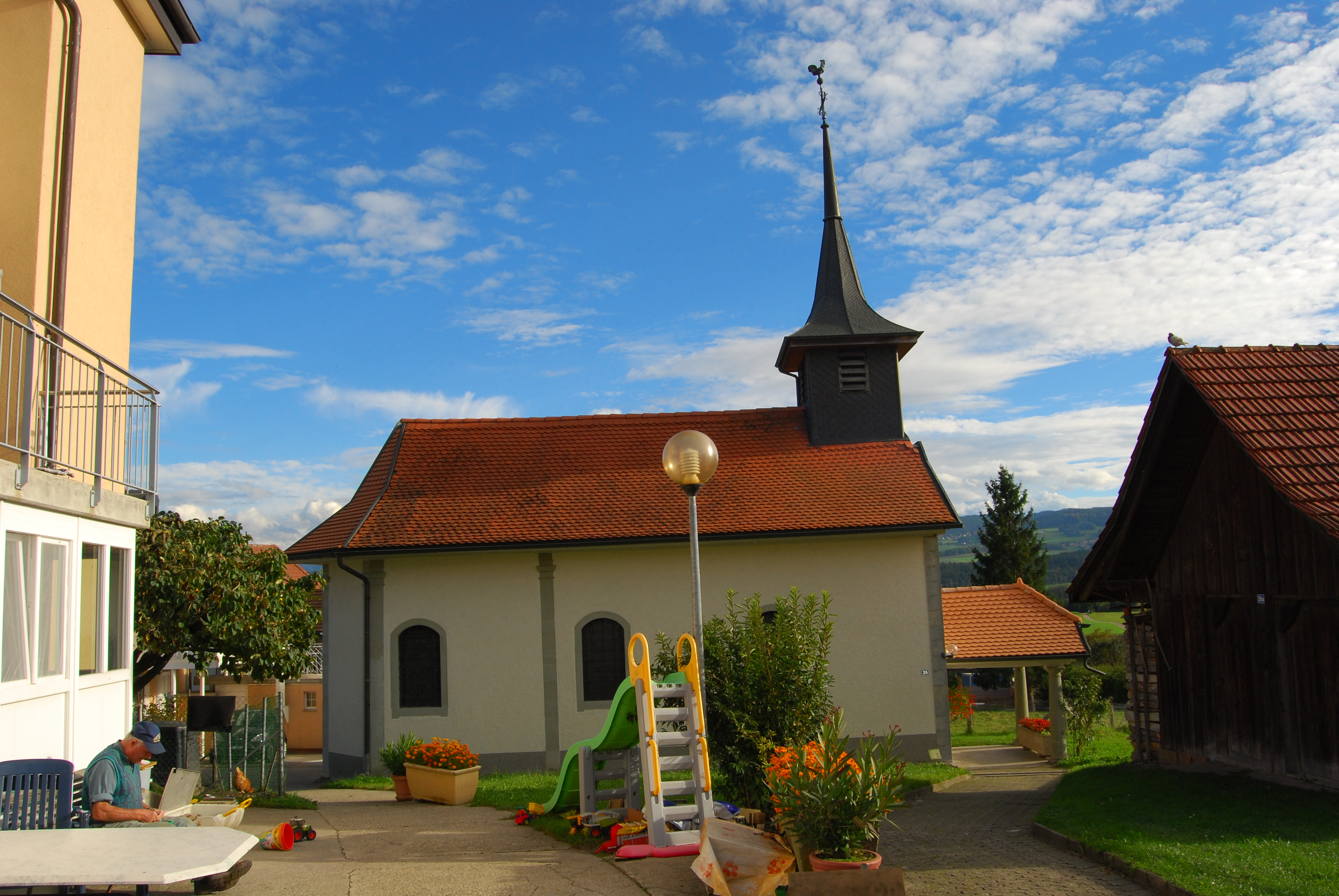

- Flag Coat of arms
- Location of Chénens
- Location within Switzerland Location within Canton of Fribourg
- Coordinates: 46°44′N 7°0′E
- Country: Switzerland
- Canton: Fribourg
- District: Sarine

Government
  - Mayor: Syndic

Area
  - Total: 3.97 km^{2} (1.53 sq mi)
- Elevation: 696 m (2,283 ft)

Population (December 2020)
  - Total: 843
  - Density: 212/km^{2} (550/sq mi)
- Time zone: UTC+01:00 (CET)
  - Summer (DST): UTC+02:00 (CEST)
- Postal code: 1744
- SFOS number: 2177
- ISO 3166 code: CH-FR
- Surrounded by: Autigny, La Brillaz, La Folliaz, Villorsonnens
- Website: chenens.ch

Chénens (French: [ʃenɑ̃s]; local Arpitan: Tsinin [tsəˈnɛ̃], otherwise spelled as in French) is a municipality in the district of Sarine in the canton of Fribourg in Switzerland. A French-speaking community, its earlier German name of Geiningen is no longer in common use.

== History ==
Chénens is first mentioned in 1138 as Cheineis.

== Geography ==
As of 2009 Chénens has an area of 4 square kilometers (1.5 mi^{2}). 2.68 km^{2} (1.03 mi^{2}) or 67.8% is used for agricultural purposes, while 0.89 km^{2} (0.34 mi^{2}) or 22.5% is forested. The rest of the region 0.4 km^{2} (0.15 mi^{2}) or 10.1% is settled (buildings or roads).

Housing and buildings made up 4.8% and transportation infrastructure made up 3.0%. Power and water infrastructure as well as other special developed areas make up 1.3% of the area. All of the forested land area is covered with dense forests. Of the agricultural land, 42.3% is used for growing crops and 24.3% is pasturage, while 1.3% is used for orchards or vine crops.

The municipality is located in the Sarine district on the cantonal highway between Fribourg and Romont (FR).

== Coat of arms ==
The blazon of the municipal coat of arms is Gules a Mastiff Argent passant gorged Or.

== Demographics ==
Chénens has a population (as of December 2020) of 843. As of 2008, 10.4% of the population are resident foreign nationals. Over the last 10 years (2000–2010) the population has changed at a rate of 19.5%. Migration accounted for 14.2%, while births and deaths accounted for 6.3%.

Most of the population (as of 2000) speaks French (520 or 93.9%) as their first language, German is the second most common (21 or 3.8%) and Portuguese is the third (5 or 0.9%).

As of 2008, the population was 48.2% male and 51.8% female. The population was made up of 277 Swiss men (42.4% of the population) and 38 (5.8%) non-Swiss men. There were 302 Swiss women (46.2%) and 36 (5.5%) non-Swiss women. Of the population in the municipality, 168 or about 30.3% were born in Chénens and lived there in 2000. There were 267 or 48.2% who were born in the same canton, while 75 or 13.5% were born somewhere else in Switzerland, and 34 or 6.1% were born outside of Switzerland.

As of 2000, children and teenagers (0–19 years old) make up 30.7% of the population, while adults (20–64 years old) make up 60.8% and seniors (over 64 years old) make up 8.5%.

As of 2000, there were 252 people who were single and never married in the municipality. There were 262 married individuals, 23 widows or widowers and 17 individuals who are divorced.

As of 2000, there were 182 private households in the municipality, and an average of 3. persons per household. There were 26 households that consist of only one person and 27 households with five or more people. In 2000, a total of 179 apartments (92.7% of the total) were permanently occupied, while 7 apartments (3.6%) were seasonally occupied and 7 apartments (3.6%) were empty. As of 2009, the construction rate of new housing units was 4.6 new units per 1000 residents. The vacancy rate for the municipality, in 2010, was 2.11%.

The historical population is given in the following chart:

== Politics ==
In the 2011 federal election the most popular party was the SPS which received 32.1% of the vote. The next three most popular parties were the SVP (27.7%), the CVP (14.7%) and the FDP (10.2%).

The SPS improved their position in Chénens rising to first, from second in 2007 (with 23.2%) The SVP moved from first in 2007 (with 24.0%) to second in 2011, the CVP lost popularity (20.0% in 2007) and the FDP lost popularity (18.4% in 2007). A total of 168 votes were cast in this election, of which 3 or 1.8% were invalid.

== Economy ==
As of 2010, Chénens had an unemployment rate of 2.1%. As of 2008, there were 20 people employed in the primary economic sector and about 7 businesses involved in this sector. 32 people were employed in the secondary sector and there were 6 businesses in this sector. 66 people were employed in the tertiary sector, with 20 businesses in this sector. There were 283 residents of the municipality who were employed in some capacity, of which females made up 44.5% of the workforce.

In 2008 the total number of full-time equivalent jobs was 92. The number of jobs in the primary sector was 14, all of which were in agriculture. The number of jobs in the secondary sector was 28 of which 22 or (78.6%) were in manufacturing and 6 (21.4%) were in construction. The number of jobs in the tertiary sector was 50. In the tertiary sector; 29 or 58.0% were in wholesale or retail sales or the repair of motor vehicles, 2 or 4.0% were in the movement and storage of goods, 12 or 24.0% were in a hotel or restaurant, 3 or 6.0% were in education.

In 2000, there were 36 workers who commuted into the municipality and 226 workers who commuted away. The municipality is a net exporter of workers, with about 6.3 workers leaving the municipality for every one entering. Of the working population, 11.3% used public transportation to get to work, and 73.1% used a private car.

== Religion ==
From the 2000 census, 477 or 86.1% were Roman Catholic, while 24 or 4.3% belonged to the Swiss Reformed Church. Of the rest of the population, there were 3 members of an Orthodox church (or about 0.54% of the population), and there were 2 individuals (or about 0.36% of the population) who belonged to another Christian church. There were 5 (or about 0.90% of the population) who were Islamic. 28 (or about 5.05% of the population) belonged to no church, are agnostic or atheist, and 15 individuals (or about 2.71% of the population) did not answer the question.

== Education ==
In Chénens about 186 or (33.6%) of the population have completed non-mandatory upper secondary education, and 49 or (8.8%) have completed additional higher education (either university or a Fachhochschule). Of the 49 who completed tertiary schooling, 73.5% were Swiss men, 20.4% were Swiss women.

The Canton of Fribourg school system provides one year of non-obligatory Kindergarten, followed by six years of Primary school. This is followed by three years of obligatory lower Secondary school where the students are separated according to ability and aptitude. Following the lower Secondary students may attend a three or four year optional upper Secondary school. The upper Secondary school is divided into gymnasium (university preparatory) and vocational programs. After they finish the upper Secondary program, students may choose to attend a Tertiary school or continue their apprenticeship.

During the 2010–11 school year, there were a total of 68 students attending 3 classes in Chénens. A total of 165 students from the municipality attended any school, either in the municipality or outside of it. There were no kindergarten classes in the municipality, but 15 students attended kindergarten in a neighboring municipality. The municipality had 3 primary classes and 68 students. During the same year, there were no lower secondary classes in the municipality, but 46 students attended lower secondary school in a neighboring municipality. There were no upper Secondary classes or vocational classes, but there were 20 upper Secondary students and 23 upper Secondary vocational students who attended classes in another municipality. The municipality had no non-university Tertiary classes, but there was one non-university Tertiary student and one specialized Tertiary student who attended classes in another municipality.

As of 2000, there were 10 students in Chénens who came from another municipality, while 73 residents attended schools outside the municipality.

== Transportation ==
The municipality has a railway station, Chénens, on the Lausanne–Bern line. It has regular service to Romont FR and Fribourg/Freiburg.
