= La Tour-de-Trême railway station =

Railway station in Bulle, Switzerland

La Tour-de-Trême
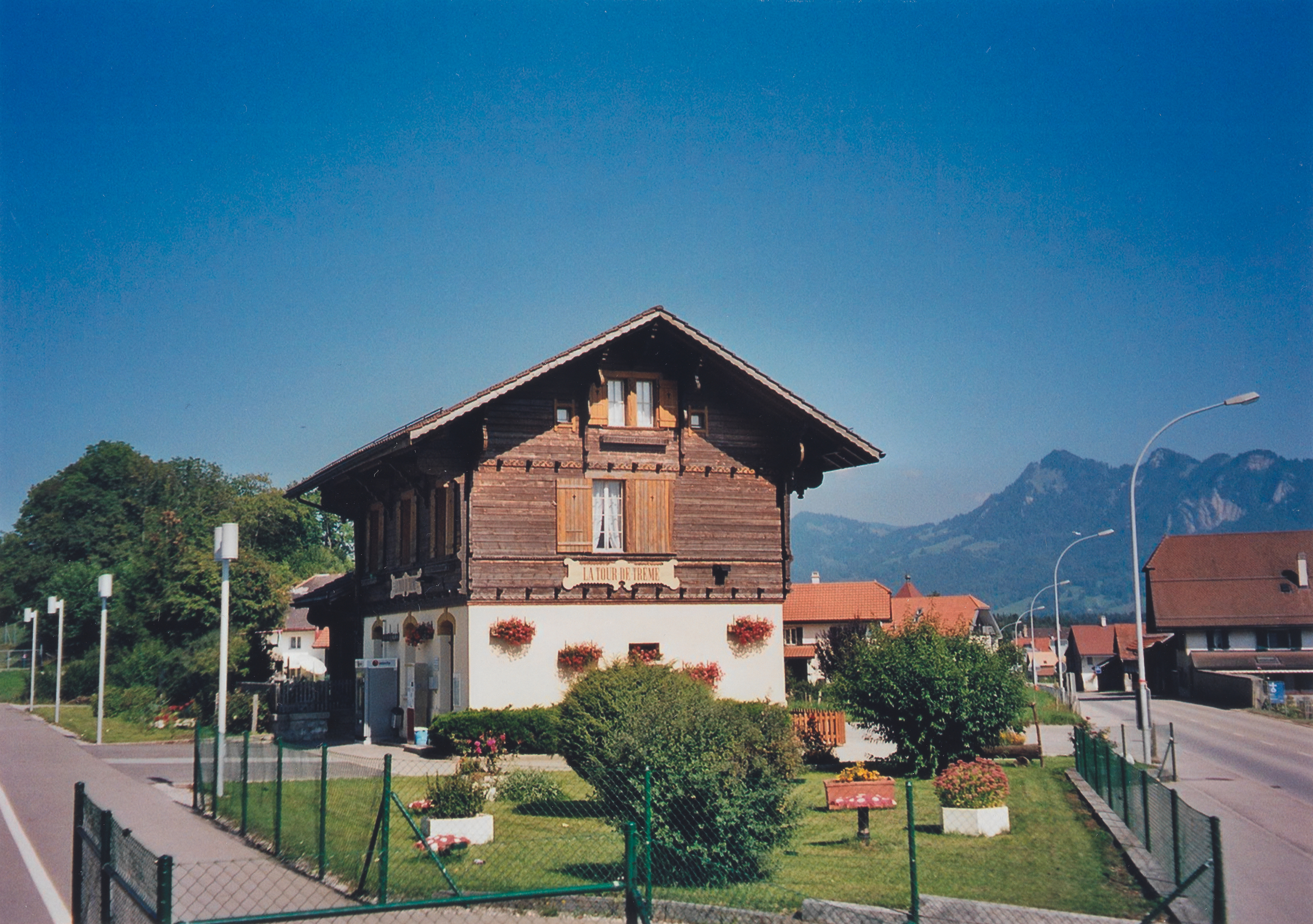
- The station building in 2006

General information
- Location: Bulle, Fribourg; Switzerland
- Coordinates: 46°36′32″N 7°03′50″E
- Elevation: 746 m (2,448 ft)
- Owner: Transports publics Fribourgeois
- Line: Bulle–Broc railway line
- Distance: 1.3 km (0.81 mi) from Bulle
- Platforms: 1 (1 side platform)
- Tracks: 1
- Train operators: Transports publics Fribourgeois
- Connections: TPF buses

Construction
- Accessible: Yes

Other information
- Station code: 8504067 (TOUV)
- Fare zone: 30 (frimobil)

History
- Opened: 29 January 1912

Services
Preceding station	RER Fribourg	Following station
Bulle towards Bern	RE2	Broc-Village towards Broc-Chocolaterie
Bulle towards Düdingen	RE3	Broc-Village towards Broc-Chocolaterie
Location

La Tour-de-Trême railway station (French: Gare de La Tour-de-Trême), is a railway station in the municipality of Bulle, in the Swiss canton of Fribourg. It is an intermediate stop on the standard gauge Bulle–Broc railway line of Transports publics Fribourgeois.

== History ==
The Chemins de fer électriques de la Gruyère constructed the Bulle–Broc railway line in 1912. La Tour-de-Trême opened on 29 January. The line was built as a 1,000 mm (3 ft 3 3/8 in) metre gauge line. The line and station were closed between April 2021 and December 2023 for rebuilding as a 1,435 mm (4 ft 8 1/2 in) standard gauge line. This permitted direct operation to via Fribourg/Freiburg to Bern. The line fully reopened on 24 August 2023. As part of the project the station was rebuilt to be accessible, with a new 150 metres (490 ft) platform.

== Services ==
As of the December 2024 timetable change, the following services stop at La Tour-de-Trême:

- RER Fribourg RE2 / RE3: half-hourly service to Düdingen and hourly service to Bern.
