= Cottens, Fribourg =

Cottens
- Municipality
- Flag Coat of arms
- Location of Cottens
- Location within Switzerland Location within Canton of Fribourg
- Coordinates: 46°45′N 7°2′E
- Country: Switzerland
- Canton: Fribourg
- District: Sarine

Government
  - Mayor: Syndic

Area
  - Total: 4.97 km^{2} (1.92 sq mi)
- Elevation: 713 m (2,339 ft)

Population (December 2020)
  - Total: 1,482
  - Density: 298/km^{2} (772/sq mi)
- Time zone: UTC+01:00 (CET)
  - Summer (DST): UTC+02:00 (CEST)
- Postal code: 1741
- SFOS number: 2186
- ISO 3166 code: CH-FR
- Surrounded by: Autigny, Farvagny, Hauterive, La Brillaz, Neyruz
- Twin towns: Combronde (France)
- Website: cottens-fr.ch

Cottens (French: [kɔtɑ̃s]; Arpitan: Cotens, locally Kotin [koˈtɛ̃]) is a municipality in the district of Sarine in the canton of Fribourg in Switzerland. Its German name of Cottingen has now largely fallen out of use.

== History ==
Cottens is first mentioned in 1138 as Cotens.

== Geography ==
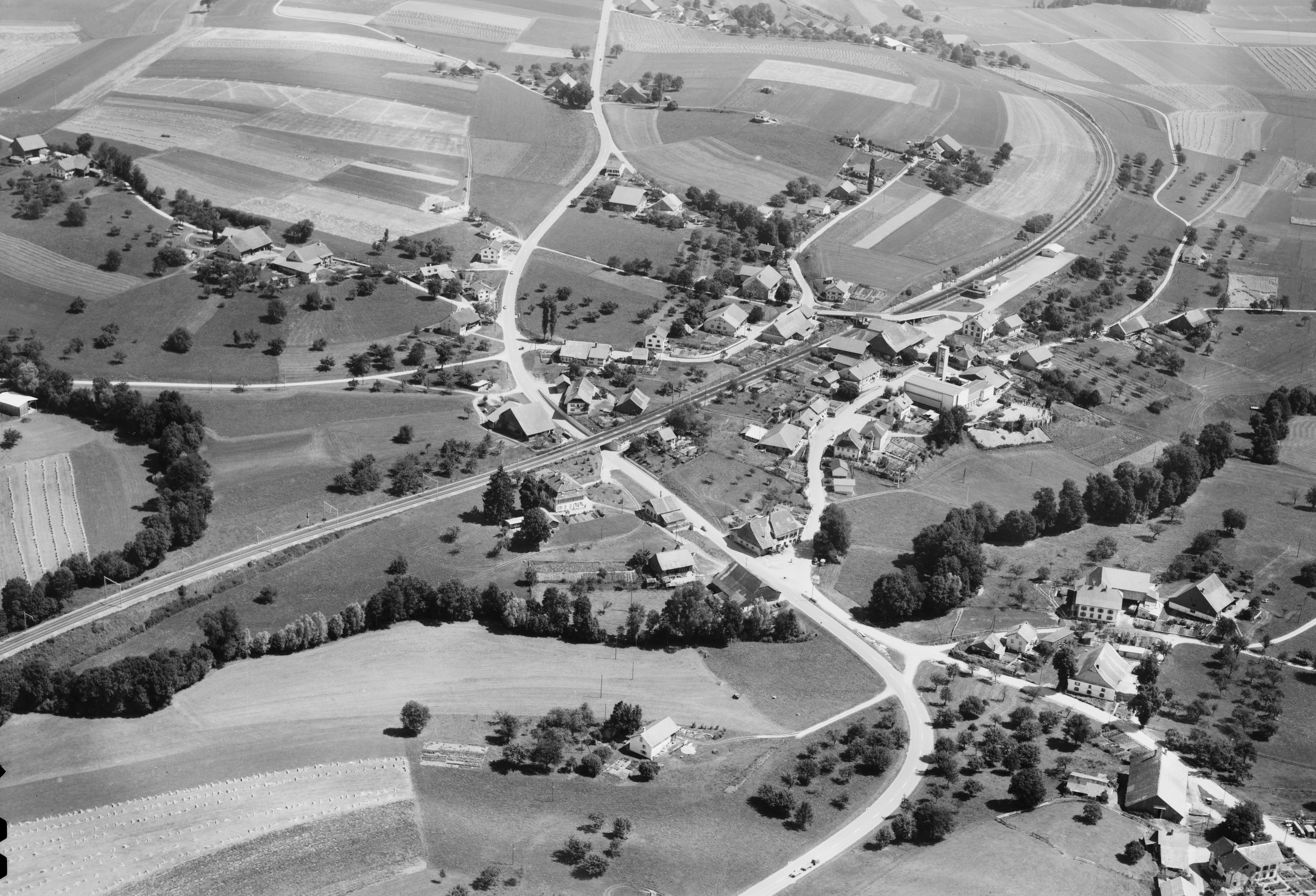
Aerial view (1964)

Cottens has an area, as of 2009, of 5 square kilometers (1.9 mi^{2}). Of this area, 3.47 km^{2} (1.34 mi^{2}) or 69.8% is used for agricultural purposes, while 0.86 km^{2} (0.33 mi^{2}) or 17.3% is forested. Of the rest of the land, 0.6 km^{2} (0.23 mi^{2}) or 12.1% is settled (buildings or roads), 0.01 km^{2} (2.5 acres) or 0.2% is either rivers or lakes and 0.03 km^{2} (7.4 acres) or 0.6% is unproductive land.

Of the built up area, housing and buildings made up 7.0% and transportation infrastructure made up 4.2%. Out of the forested land, all of the forested land area is covered with heavy forests. Of the agricultural land, 46.1% is used for growing crops and 22.5% is pastures, while 1.2% is used for orchards or vine crops. All the water in the municipality is flowing water.

The municipality is located in the Sarine district, on the road and rail lines between Romont and Fribourg.

== Coat of arms ==
The blazon of the municipal coat of arms is Per fess Argent and sable overall a Key Or.

== Demographics ==
Cottens has a population (as of December 2020) of 1,482. As of 2008, 13.0% of the population are resident foreign nationals. Over the last 10 years (2000–2010) the population has changed at a rate of 37.1%. Migration accounted for 26.9%, while births and deaths accounted for 9.5%.

Most of the population (as of 2000) speaks French (896 or 93.0%) as their first language, German is the second most common (42 or 4.4%) and Italian is the third (7 or 0.7%).

As of 2008, the population was 49.6% male and 50.4% female. The population was made up of 548 Swiss men (42.9% of the population) and 86 (6.7%) non-Swiss men. There were 560 Swiss women (43.9%) and 83 (6.5%) non-Swiss women. Of the population in the municipality, 341 or about 35.4% were born in Cottens and lived there in 2000. There were 420 or 43.6% who were born in the same canton, while 100 or 10.4% were born somewhere else in Switzerland, and 79 or 8.2% were born outside of Switzerland.

As of 2000, children and teenagers (0–19 years old) make up 24.2% of the population, while adults (20–64 years old) make up 59.6% and seniors (over 64 years old) make up 16.2%.

As of 2000, there were 373 people who were single and never married in the municipality. There were 484 married individuals, 72 widows or widowers and 34 individuals who are divorced.

As of 2000, there were 335 private households in the municipality, and an average of 2.7 persons per household. There were 74 households that consist of only one person and 33 households with five or more people. In 2000, a total of 328 apartments (91.6% of the total) were permanently occupied, while 13 apartments (3.6%) were seasonally occupied and 17 apartments (4.7%) were empty. As of 2009, the construction rate of new housing units was 7.1 new units per 1000 residents. The vacancy rate for the municipality, in 2010, was 1.66%.

The historical population is given in the following chart:

== Heritage sites of national significance ==
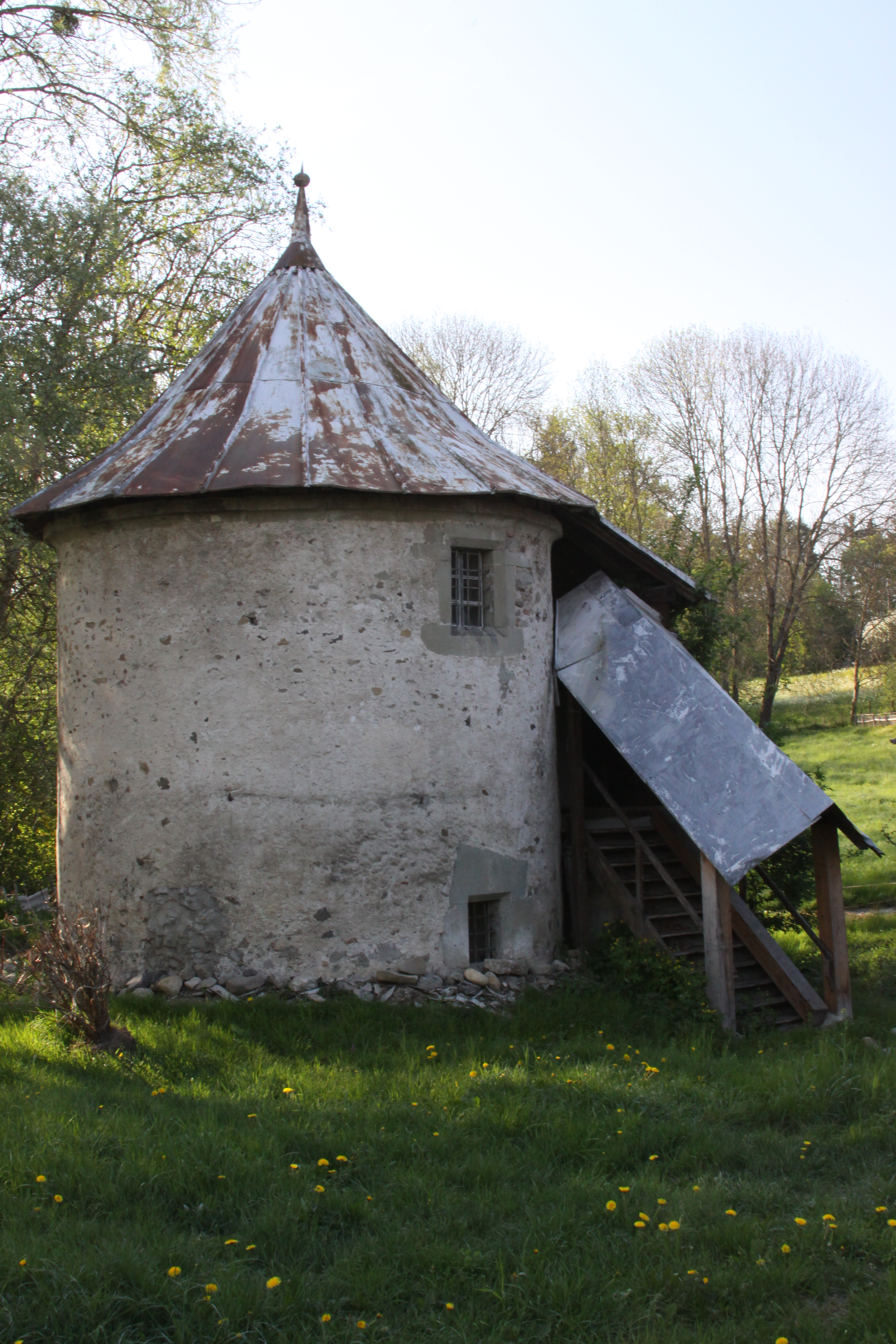
Grenier (Granary) in Cottons

The Grenier is listed as a Swiss heritage site of national significance.

== Twin Town ==
Cottens is twinned with the town of Combronde, France.

== Politics ==
In the 2011 federal election the most popular party was the SPS which received 27.4% of the vote. The next three most popular parties were the SVP (20.2%), the CVP (19.0%) and the FDP (12.3%).

The SPS improved their position in Cottens rising to first, from second in 2007 (with 27.0%) The SVP moved from third in 2007 (with 18.9%) to second in 2011, the CVP moved from first in 2007 (with 27.3%) to third and the FDP retained about the same popularity (14.5% in 2007). A total of 372 votes were cast in this election, of which 15 or 4.0% were invalid.

== Economy ==
As of 2010, Cottens had an unemployment rate of 3.9%. As of 2008, there were 37 people employed in the primary economic sector and about 13 businesses involved in this sector. 16 people were employed in the secondary sector and there were 7 businesses in this sector. 154 people were employed in the tertiary sector, with 17 businesses in this sector. There were 469 residents of the municipality who were employed in some capacity, of which females made up 41.2% of the workforce.

In 2008 the total number of full-time equivalent jobs was 155. The number of jobs in the primary sector was 29, all of which were in agriculture. The number of jobs in the secondary sector was 15 of which 5 or (33.3%) were in manufacturing and 10 (66.7%) were in construction. The number of jobs in the tertiary sector was 111. In the tertiary sector; 14 or 12.6% were in wholesale or retail sales or the repair of motor vehicles, 2 or 1.8% were in the movement and storage of goods, 3 or 2.7% were the insurance or financial industry, 3 or 2.7% were technical professionals or scientists, 8 or 7.2% were in education and 76 or 68.5% were in health care.

In 2000, there were 115 workers who commuted into the municipality and 361 workers who commuted away. The municipality is a net exporter of workers, with about 3.1 workers leaving the municipality for every one entering. Of the working population, 10.7% used public transportation to get to work, and 73.1% used a private car.

== Religion ==
From the 2000 census, 842 or 87.4% were Roman Catholic, while 47 or 4.9% belonged to the Swiss Reformed Church. Of the rest of the population, there were 3 members of an Orthodox church (or about 0.31% of the population), and there were 6 individuals (or about 0.62% of the population) who belonged to another Christian church. There were 11 (or about 1.14% of the population) who were Islamic. There were 2 individuals who were Buddhist. 29 (or about 3.01% of the population) belonged to no church, are agnostic or atheist, and 26 individuals (or about 2.70% of the population) did not answer the question.

== Education ==
In Cottens about 295 or (30.6%) of the population have completed non-mandatory upper secondary education, and 116 or (12.0%) have completed additional higher education (either university or a Fachhochschule). Of the 116 who completed tertiary schooling, 59.5% were Swiss men, 25.0% were Swiss women, 6.9% were non-Swiss men and 8.6% were non-Swiss women.

The Canton of Fribourg school system provides one year of non-obligatory Kindergarten, followed by six years of Primary school. This is followed by three years of obligatory lower Secondary school where the students are separated according to ability and aptitude. Following the lower Secondary students may attend a three or four year optional upper Secondary school. The upper Secondary school is divided into gymnasium (university preparatory) and vocational programs. After they finish the upper Secondary program, students may choose to attend a Tertiary school or continue their apprenticeship.

During the 2010–11 school year, there were a total of 192 students attending 10 classes in Cottens. A total of 296 students from the municipality attended any school, either in the municipality or outside of it. There were 3 kindergarten classes with a total of 50 students in the municipality. The municipality had 7 primary classes and 142 students. During the same year, there were no lower secondary classes in the municipality, but 38 students attended lower secondary school in a neighboring municipality. There were no upper Secondary classes or vocational classes, but there were 27 upper Secondary students and 26 upper Secondary vocational students who attended classes in another municipality. The municipality had no non-university Tertiary classes, but there were 3 non-university Tertiary students and 11 specialized Tertiary students who attended classes in another municipality.

As of 2000, there were 80 students in Cottens who came from another municipality, while 74 residents attended schools outside the municipality.

== Transportation ==
The municipality has a railway station, Cottens FR, on the Lausanne–Bern line. It has regular service to Romont FR and Fribourg/Freiburg.
