= Cottens FR railway station =

Railway station in Cottens, Canton of Fribourg, Switzerland

Cottens FR
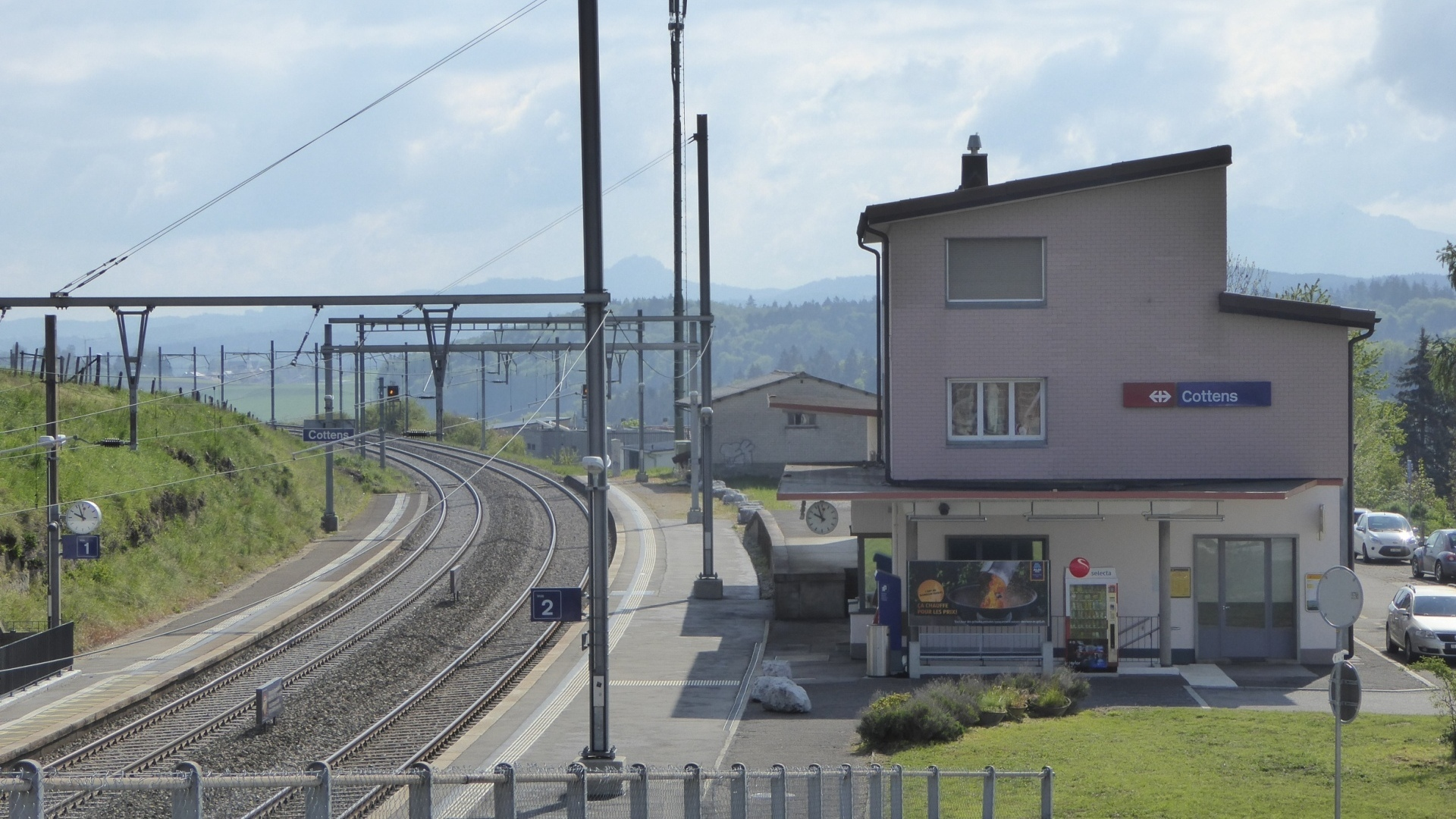
- The station in 2019

General information
- Location: Cottens; Switzerland
- Coordinates: 46°45′04″N 7°02′05″E
- Elevation: 712 m (2,336 ft)
- Owner: Swiss Federal Railways
- Line: Lausanne–Bern line
- Distance: 52.4 km (32.6 mi) from Lausanne
- Platforms: 2 (2 side platforms)
- Tracks: 2
- Train operators: Swiss Federal Railways
- Connections: CarPostal SA bus line

Construction
- Cycle facilities: Yes (12 spaces)
- Accessible: No

Other information
- Station code: 8504026 (COT)
- Fare zone: 35 and 36 (frimobil)

Passengers
- 2018: 650 per weekday (SBB)

Services
Preceding station	RER Fribourg	Following station
Chénens towards Lausanne	S40	Neyruz FR towards Fribourg/Freiburg
Chénens towards Lausanne	S41	Neyruz FR towards Fribourg/Freiburg
Location

Cottens FR railway station (French: Gare de Cottens FR, German: Bahnhof Cottens FR) is a railway station in the municipality of Cottens, in the Swiss canton of Fribourg. It is an intermediate stop on the standard gauge Lausanne–Bern line of Swiss Federal Railways.

== Services ==
As of the December 2024 timetable change, the following services stop at Cottens FR:

- RER Fribourg S40 / S41: half-hourly service between Lausanne and Fribourg/Freiburg.
