= Fribourg/Freiburg Poya railway station =

Railway station in Fribourg, Switzerland

Fribourg/Freiburg Poya
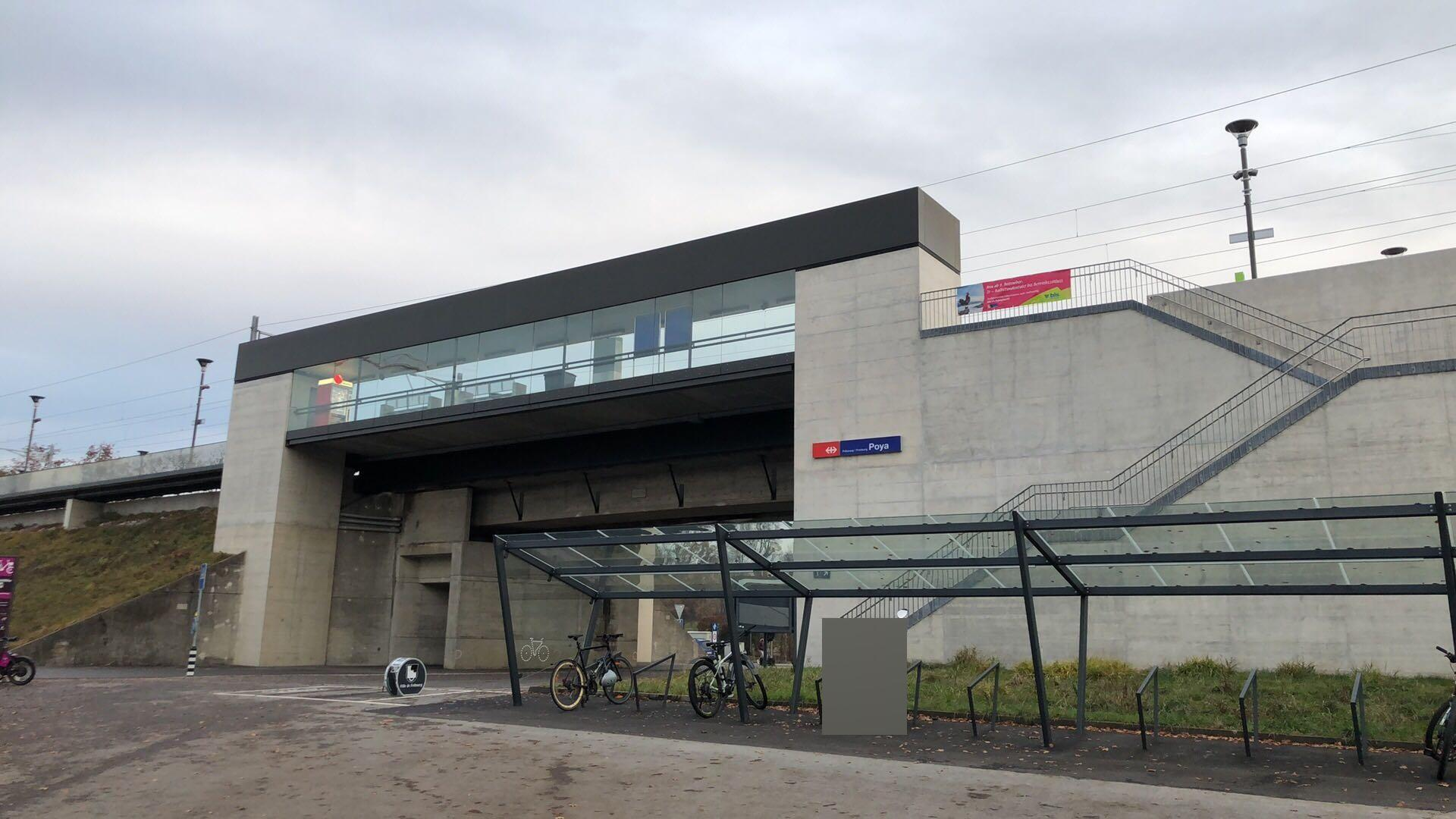
- The station in 2018

General information
- Location: Fribourg; Switzerland
- Coordinates: 46°48′56″N 7°09′23″E
- Elevation: 614 m (2,014 ft)
- Owner: Swiss Federal Railways
- Line: Lausanne–Bern line
- Platforms: 2 side platforms
- Tracks: 2
- Train operators: BLS AG
- Connections: TPF trolleybuses

Construction
- Cycle facilities: Yes (26 spaces)
- Accessible: Yes

Other information
- Station code: 8519133 (FRPO)
- Fare zone: 10 (frimobil)

History
- Opened: 14 December 2014

Passengers
- 2023: 700 per weekday (BLS)

Services
Preceding station	Bern S-Bahn	Following station
Fribourg/Freiburg Terminus	S1	Düdingen towards Thun
Location

Fribourg/Freiburg Poya railway station (French: Gare de Fribourg Poya, German: Bahnhof Freiburg Poya) is a railway station in the municipality of Fribourg, in the Swiss canton of Fribourg. It is an intermediate stop on the standard gauge Lausanne–Bern line of Swiss Federal Railways. The station opened at the end of 2014 and is adjacent to BCF Arena, home of the HC Fribourg-Gottéron professional ice hockey team.

== Services ==
As of the December 2024 timetable change, the following services stop at Fribourg/Freiburg Poya:

- Bern S-Bahn S1: half-hourly service between Fribourg/Freiburg and Thun.
