= Chénens railway station =

Railway station in Chénens, Switzerland

Chénens
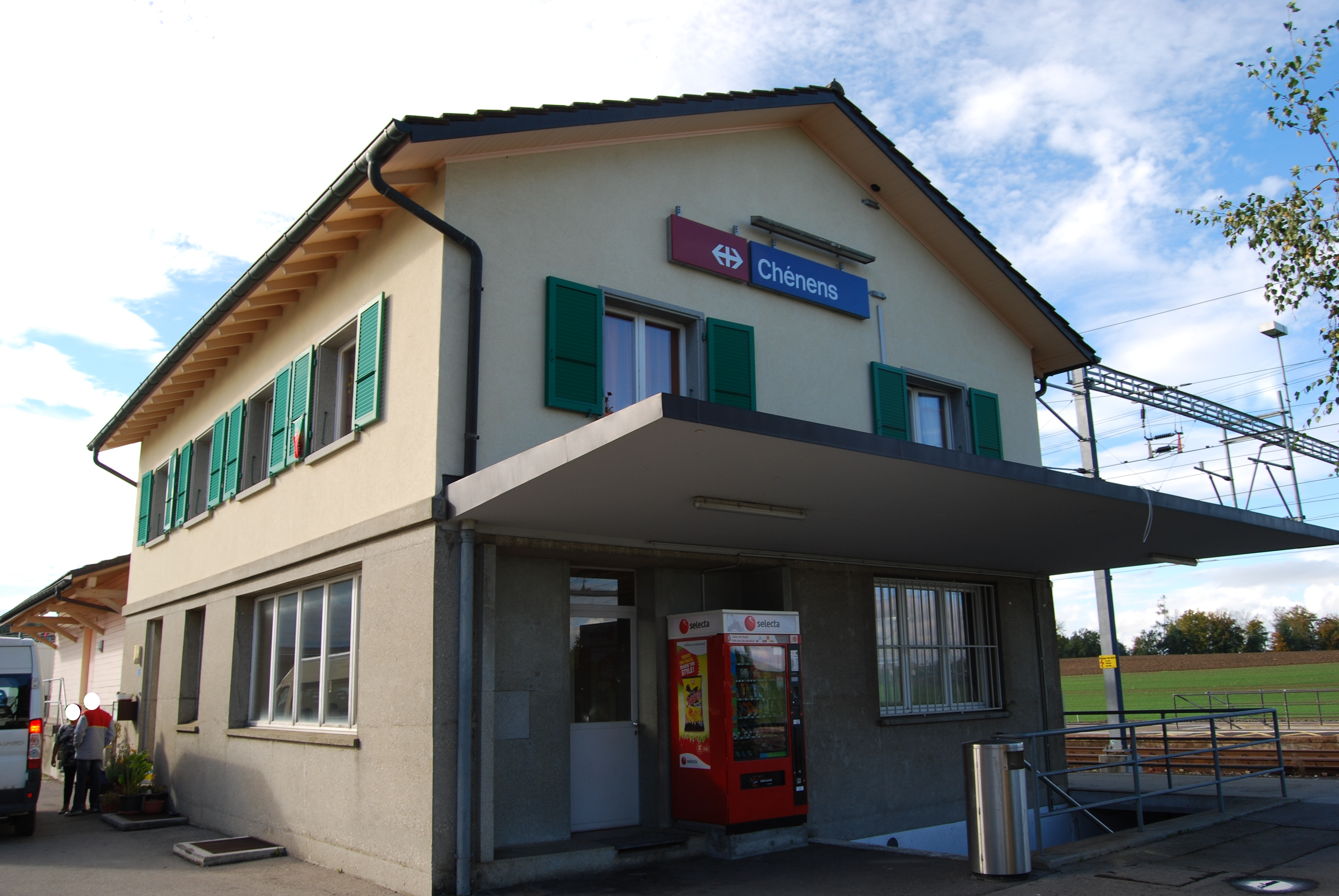
- The station building in 2012

General information
- Location: Chénens; Switzerland
- Coordinates: 46°44′57″N 7°00′02″E
- Elevation: 722 m (2,369 ft)
- Owner: Swiss Federal Railways
- Line: Lausanne–Bern line
- Distance: 49.6 km (30.8 mi) from Lausanne
- Platforms: 2 (1 island platform)
- Tracks: 2
- Train operators: Swiss Federal Railways
- Connections: Transports publics Fribourgeois buses

Construction
- Parking: Yes (15 spaces)
- Cycle facilities: Yes (35 spaces)
- Accessible: No

Other information
- Station code: 8504025 (CHE)
- Fare zone: 36 (frimobil)

Passengers
- 2018: 270 per weekday (SBB)

Services
Preceding station	RER Fribourg	Following station
Villaz-St-Pierre towards Lausanne	S40	Cottens FR towards Fribourg/Freiburg
Villaz-St-Pierre towards Lausanne	S41	Cottens FR towards Fribourg/Freiburg
Location

Chénens railway station (French: Gare de Chénens, German: Bahnhof Chénens) is a railway station in the municipality of Chénens, in the Swiss canton of Fribourg. It is an intermediate stop on the standard gauge Lausanne–Bern line of Swiss Federal Railways.

== Services ==
As of the December 2024 timetable change, the following services stop at Chénens:

- RER Fribourg S40 / S41: half-hourly service between Lausanne and Fribourg/Freiburg.
