= Cottens =

Cottens may refer to:

- Cottens, Fribourg, Switzerland
- Cottens, Vaud, Switzerland
