= Neyruz, Switzerland =

Neyruz
- Municipality
- Coat of arms
- Location of Neyruz
- Location within Switzerland Location within Canton of Fribourg
- Coordinates: 46°46′N 7°4′E
- Country: Switzerland
- Canton: Fribourg
- District: Sarine

Government
  - Mayor: Syndic

Area
  - Total: 5.54 km^{2} (2.14 sq mi)
- Elevation: 692 m (2,270 ft)

Population (December 2020)
  - Total: 2,757
  - Density: 498/km^{2} (1,290/sq mi)
- Time zone: UTC+01:00 (CET)
  - Summer (DST): UTC+02:00 (CEST)
- Postal code: 1740
- SFOS number: 2211
- ISO 3166 code: CH-FR
- Surrounded by: Avry, Cottens, Hauterive, La Brillaz, Matran
- Website: www.neyruz.ch

Neyruz (French: [nɛːʁy]; Arpitan: Nêruz [ˈneʁy]) is a municipality in the district of Sarine in the canton of Fribourg in Switzerland.

== History ==
Neyruz is first mentioned in 1137 as Nuerus. In 1138 it was mentioned as Nuruos. The municipality was formerly known by its German name Rauschenbach, however, that name is no longer used.

== Geography ==
Neyruz has an area, as of 2009, of 5.5 square kilometers (2.1 mi^{2}). Of this area, 3.2 km^{2} (1.2 mi^{2}) or 57.8% is used for agricultural purposes, while 1.44 km^{2} (0.56 mi^{2}) or 26.0% is forested. Of the rest of the land, 0.85 km^{2} (0.33 mi^{2}) or 15.3% is settled (buildings or roads), 0.04 km^{2} (9.9 acres) or 0.7% is either rivers or lakes and 0.01 km^{2} (2.5 acres) or 0.2% is unproductive land.

Of the built up area, housing and buildings made up 7.6% and transportation infrastructure made up 5.6%. Out of the forested land, all of the forested land area is covered with heavy forests. Of the agricultural land, 40.8% is used for growing crops and 16.1% is pastures. All the water in the municipality is flowing water.

The municipality is located in the Sarine district, on the left bank of the Glane river.

== Coat of arms ==
The blazon of the municipal coat of arms is Argent a Bar Gules couped in bend sinister between three Roses of the same seeded proper.

== Demographics ==
Neyruz has a population (as of December 2020) of 2,757. As of 2008, 13.7% of the population are resident foreign nationals. Over the last 10 years (2000–2010) the population has changed at a rate of 33.5%. Migration accounted for 26.9%, while births and deaths accounted for 8.7%.

Most of the population (as of 2000) speaks French (1,498 or 89.9%) as their first language, German is the second most common (113 or 6.8%) and Italian is the third (12 or 0.7%). There are 3 people who speak Romansh.

As of 2008, the population was 49.8% male and 50.2% female. The population was made up of 896 Swiss men (42.7% of the population) and 147 (7.0%) non-Swiss men. There were 916 Swiss women (43.7%) and 137 (6.5%) non-Swiss women. Of the population in the municipality, 449 or about 27.0% were born in Neyruz and lived there in 2000. There were 733 or 44.0% who were born in the same canton, while 250 or 15.0% were born somewhere else in Switzerland, and 186 or 11.2% were born outside of Switzerland.

As of 2000, children and teenagers (0–19 years old) make up 31.3% of the population, while adults (20–64 years old) make up 60.9% and seniors (over 64 years old) make up 7.9%.

As of 2000, there were 738 people who were single and never married in the municipality. There were 803 married individuals, 56 widows or widowers and 69 individuals who are divorced.

As of 2000, there were 594 private households in the municipality, and an average of 2.8 persons per household. There were 129 households that consist of only one person and 68 households with five or more people. In 2000, a total of 578 apartments (93.8% of the total) were permanently occupied, while 16 apartments (2.6%) were seasonally occupied and 22 apartments (3.6%) were empty. As of 2009, the construction rate of new housing units was 4.2 new units per 1000 residents. The vacancy rate for the municipality, in 2010, was 1.36%.

The historical population is given in the following chart:

== Politics ==
In the 2011 federal election the most popular party was the SPS which received 36.8% of the vote. The next three most popular parties were the CVP (17.6%), the SVP (16.2%) and the FDP (8.6%).

The SPS received about the same percentage of the vote as they did in the 2007 Federal election (34.4% in 2007 vs 36.8% in 2011). The CVP retained about the same popularity (21.2% in 2007), the SVP retained about the same popularity (16.8% in 2007) and the FDP retained about the same popularity (13.0% in 2007). A total of 699 votes were cast in this election, of which 12 or 1.7% were invalid.

== Economy ==
As of 2010, Neyruz had an unemployment rate of 2.3%. As of 2008, there were 27 people employed in the primary economic sector and about 8 businesses involved in this sector. 72 people were employed in the secondary sector and there were 13 businesses in this sector. 150 people were employed in the tertiary sector, with 32 businesses in this sector. There were 860 residents of the municipality who were employed in some capacity, of which females made up 43.5% of the workforce.

In 2008 the total number of full-time equivalent jobs was 196. The number of jobs in the primary sector was 21, of which 11 were in agriculture and 10 were in forestry or lumber production. The number of jobs in the secondary sector was 67 of which 14 or (20.9%) were in manufacturing and 53 (79.1%) were in construction. The number of jobs in the tertiary sector was 108. In the tertiary sector; 29 or 26.9% were in wholesale or retail sales or the repair of motor vehicles, 5 or 4.6% were in the movement and storage of goods, 17 or 15.7% were in a hotel or restaurant, 9 or 8.3% were in the information industry, 1 was the insurance or financial industry, 7 or 6.5% were technical professionals or scientists, 14 or 13.0% were in education and 14 or 13.0% were in health care.

In 2000, there were 74 workers who commuted into the municipality and 715 workers who commuted away. The municipality is a net exporter of workers, with about 9.7 workers leaving the municipality for every one entering. Of the working population, 12% used public transportation to get to work, and 73.7% used a private car.

== Religion ==
From the 2000 census, 1,370 or 82.2% were Roman Catholic, while 127 or 7.6% belonged to the Swiss Reformed Church. Of the rest of the population, there were 4 members of an Orthodox church (or about 0.24% of the population), and there were 17 individuals (or about 1.02% of the population) who belonged to another Christian church. There were 36 (or about 2.16% of the population) who were Islamic. There was 1 person who was Buddhist and 2 individuals who belonged to another church. 82 (or about 4.92% of the population) belonged to no church, are agnostic or atheist, and 35 individuals (or about 2.10% of the population) did not answer the question.

== Education ==
In Neyruz about 501 or (30.1%) of the population have completed non-mandatory upper secondary education, and 307 or (18.4%) have completed additional higher education (either university or a Fachhochschule). Of the 307 who completed tertiary schooling, 63.5% were Swiss men, 27.7% were Swiss women, 4.6% were non-Swiss men and 4.2% were non-Swiss women.

The Canton of Fribourg school system provides one year of non-obligatory Kindergarten, followed by six years of Primary school. This is followed by three years of obligatory lower Secondary school where the students are separated according to ability and aptitude. Following the lower Secondary students may attend a three or four year optional upper Secondary school. The upper Secondary school is divided into gymnasium (university preparatory) and vocational programs. After they finish the upper Secondary program, students may choose to attend a Tertiary school or continue their apprenticeship.

During the 2010-11 school year, there were a total of 245 students attending 13 classes in Neyruz. A total of 505 students from the municipality attended any school, either in the municipality or outside of it. There were 3 kindergarten classes with a total of 48 students in the municipality. The municipality had 10 primary classes and 197 students. During the same year, there were no lower secondary classes in the municipality, but 102 students attended lower secondary school in a neighboring municipality. There were no upper Secondary classes or vocational classes, but there were 85 upper Secondary students and 55 upper Secondary vocational students who attended classes in another municipality. The municipality had no non-university Tertiary classes, but there were 6 non-university Tertiary students and 11 specialized Tertiary students who attended classes in another municipality.

As of 2000, there were 2 students in Neyruz who came from another municipality, while 122 residents attended schools outside the municipality.

== Transportation ==
The municipality has a railway station, Neyruz FR, on the Lausanne–Bern line. It has regular service to Romont FR and Fribourg/Freiburg.
