= Neyruz =

Neyruz may refer to the following:

- Nayrouz, a Coptic celebration on Sep. 11
- Neyruz, Switzerland, a district of Fribourg
- Neyruz-sur-Moudon, a municipality in Switzerland

== See also ==
- Nowruz
