= Broc =

- Municipality
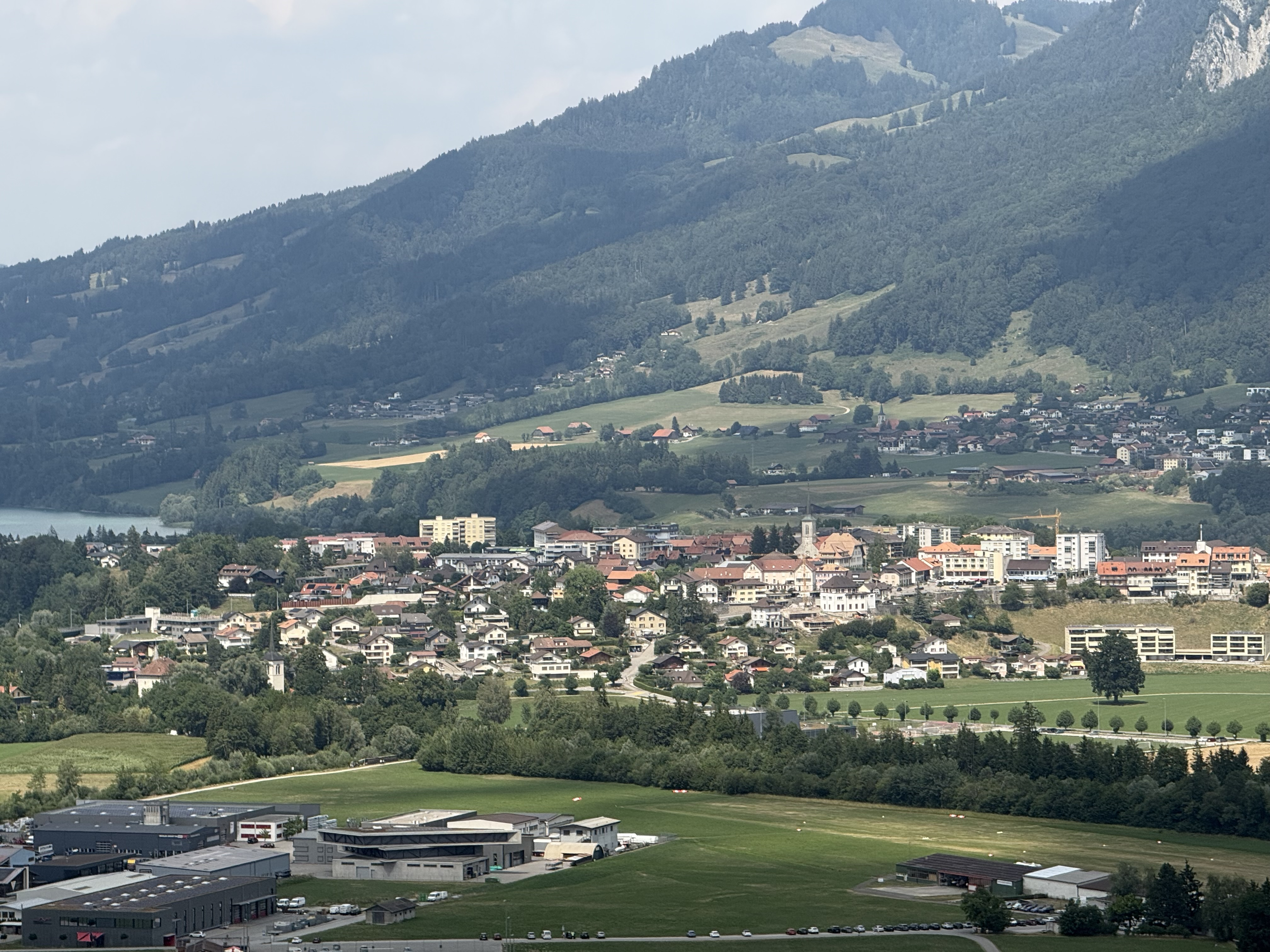
- Main town of Broc

- Flag Coat of arms
- Location of Broc
- Location within Switzerland Location within Canton of Fribourg
- Coordinates: 46°36′N 7°6′E
- Country: Switzerland
- Canton: Fribourg
- District: Gruyère

Government
  - Mayor: Syndic

Area
  - Total: 10.06 km^{2} (3.88 sq mi)
- Elevation: 718 m (2,356 ft)

Population (December 2020)
  - Total: 2,662
  - Density: 264.6/km^{2} (685.3/sq mi)
- Time zone: UTC+01:00 (CET)
  - Summer (DST): UTC+02:00 (CEST)
- Postal code: 1636
- SFOS number: 2124
- ISO 3166 code: CH-FR
- Surrounded by: Botterens, Châtel-sur-Montsalvens, Crésuz, Gruyères, La Tour-de-Trême, Morlon, Val-de-Charmey
- Website: broc.ch

Broc (/brɒk/ or /broʊ/; French: [bʁo]; Arpitan: Broc or Bro, locally [bʀo]) is a municipality in the district of Gruyère in the canton of Fribourg in Switzerland.

== History ==
Broc is first mentioned in 1115 as Broc and Broch. The municipality was formerly known by its German name Bruck, but that name is no longer used.

In 1898, the Cailler chocolate factory was opened. As a consequence, the population of Broc tripled. The factory hydroelectrical plant on the Jogne enabled the electrification of the entire village.

== Geography ==
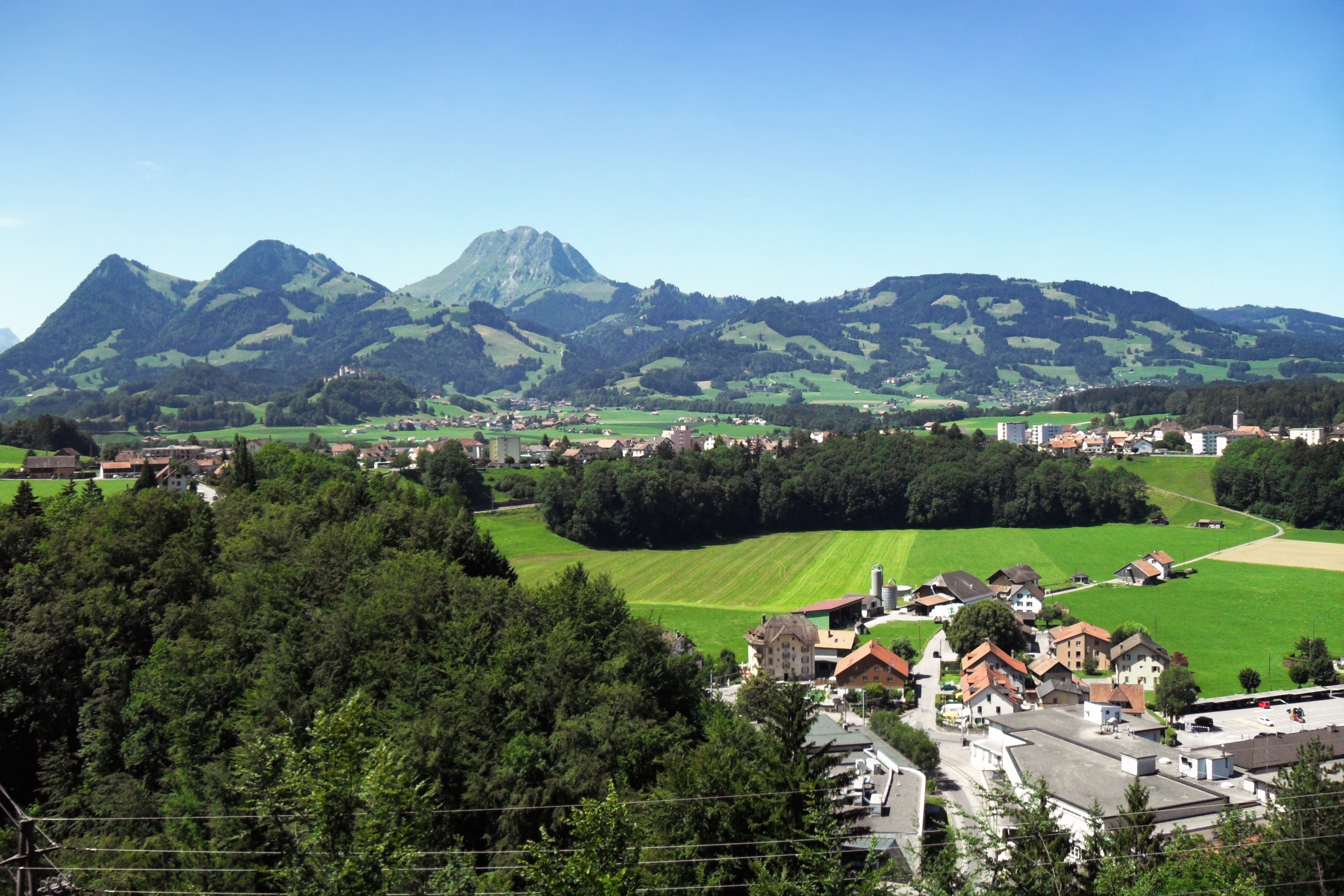
Countryside of Broc from the industrial area

Broc has an area, as of 2009, of 10 square kilometers (3.9 mi^{2}). Of this area, 4.2 km^{2} (1.6 mi^{2}) or 41.8% is used for agricultural purposes, while 4.44 km^{2} (1.71 mi^{2}) or 44.2% is forested. Of the rest of the land, 0.91 km^{2} (0.35 mi^{2}) or 9.1% is settled (buildings or roads), 0.29 km^{2} (0.11 mi^{2}) or 2.9% is either rivers or lakes and 0.22 km^{2} (0.085 mi^{2}) or 2.2% is unproductive land.

Of the built-up area, housing and buildings made up 4.8% and transportation infrastructure made up 2.6%. Of the forested land, 42.2% of the total land area is heavily forested and 2.0% is covered with orchards or small clusters of trees. Of the agricultural land, 6.2% is used for growing crops, 20.6% is pastures and 14.8% is used for alpine pastures. Of the water in the municipality, 1.4% is in lakes and 1.5% is in rivers and streams.

The municipality is located in the Greyerz district, on the Bulle-Boltigen road near the Jaun Pass.

== Coat of arms ==
The blazon of the municipal coat of arms is Gules, a Crane Argent rising from a chevron-like Bridge Or and in chief dexter a Mullet of Five of the last.

== Demographics ==
Aerial view in 1949

Broc has a population (as of December 2020) of 2,662. As of 2008, 25.4% of the population are resident foreign nationals. Over the last 10 years (2000–2010) the population has changed at a rate of 8%. Migration accounted for 10%, while births and deaths accounted for 0.4%.

Most of the population (as of 2000) speaks French (1,826 or 88.3%) as their first language, Portuguese is the second most common (60 or 2.9%) and German is the third (54 or 2.6%). There are 18 people who speak Italian.

As of 2008, the population was 50.8% male and 49.2% female. The population was made up of 783 Swiss men (34.9% of the population) and 355 (15.8%) non-Swiss men. There were 845 Swiss women (37.7%) and 259 (11.6%) non-Swiss women. Of the population in the municipality, 659 (31.9%) were born in Broc and lived there in 2000. There were 746 (36.1%) who were born in the same canton, while 215 (10.4%) were born somewhere else in Switzerland, and 336 (16.2%) were born outside of Switzerland.

As of 2000, children and teenagers (0–19 years old) make up 24.8% of the population, while adults (20–64 years old) make up 57.7% and seniors (over 64 years old) make up 17.5%.

As of 2000, 821 people were single and never married in the municipality, 1,000 married individuals, 159 widows or widowers, and 88 individuals who are divorced.

As of 2000, there were 826 private households in the municipality, and an average of 2.4 persons per household. 288 households consist of only one person and 59 households with five or more people. In 2000, a total of 819 apartments (85.1% of the total) were permanently occupied, while 73 apartments (7.6%) were seasonally occupied and 70 apartments (7.3%) were empty. As of 2009, the construction rate of new housing units was 5.4 new units per 1000 residents. The vacancy rate for the municipality, in 2010, was 0.29%.

The historical population is given in the following chart:

== Heritage sites of national significance ==
The Barrage De Montsalvens (shared with Châtel-sur-Montsalvens), and the Notre-Dame des Marches Chapel are listed as Swiss heritage sites of national significance. The Broc-Fabrique and Broc-Vieille Cure areas are both part of the Inventory of Swiss Heritage Sites.

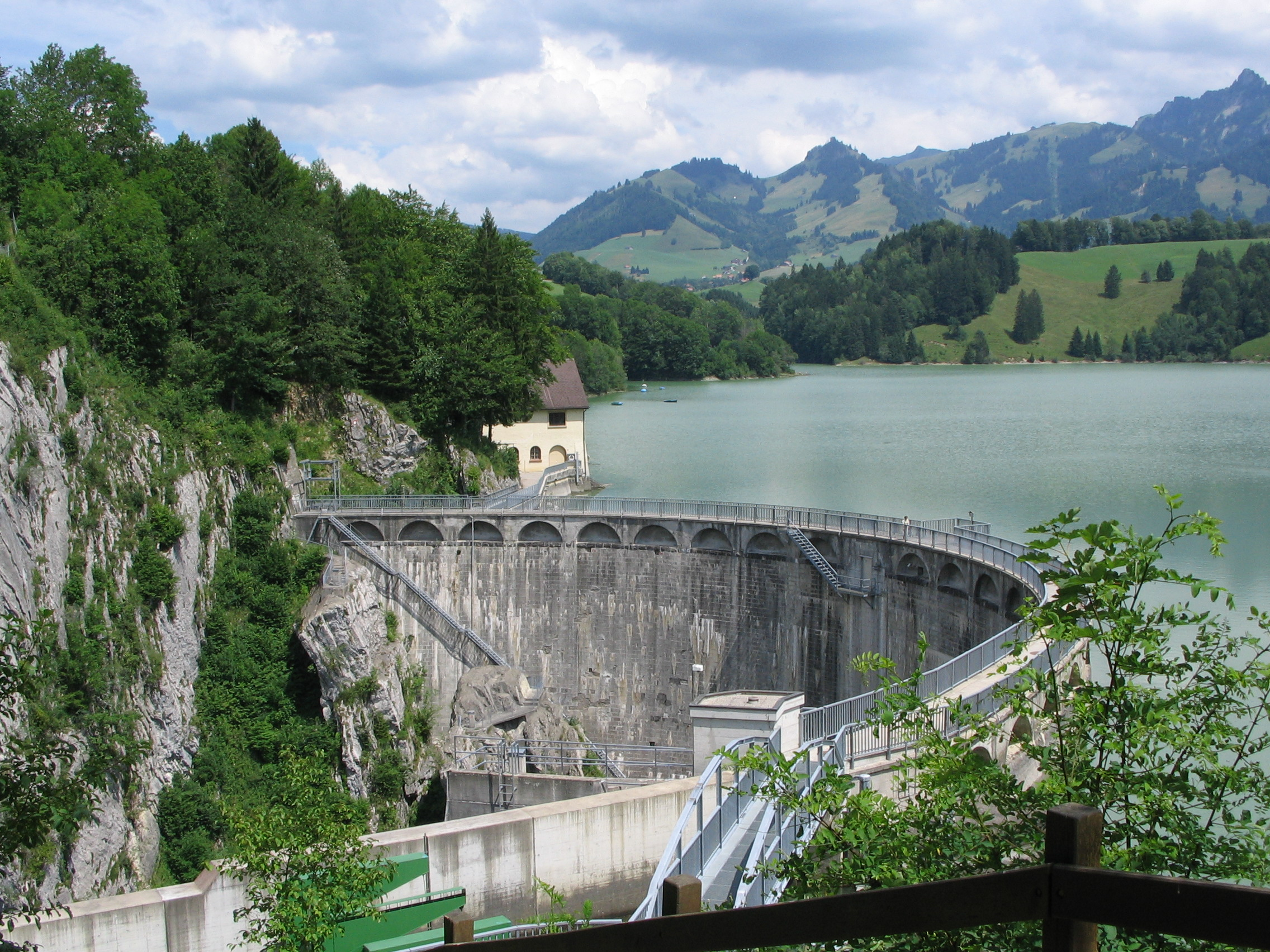
Barrage De Montsalvens

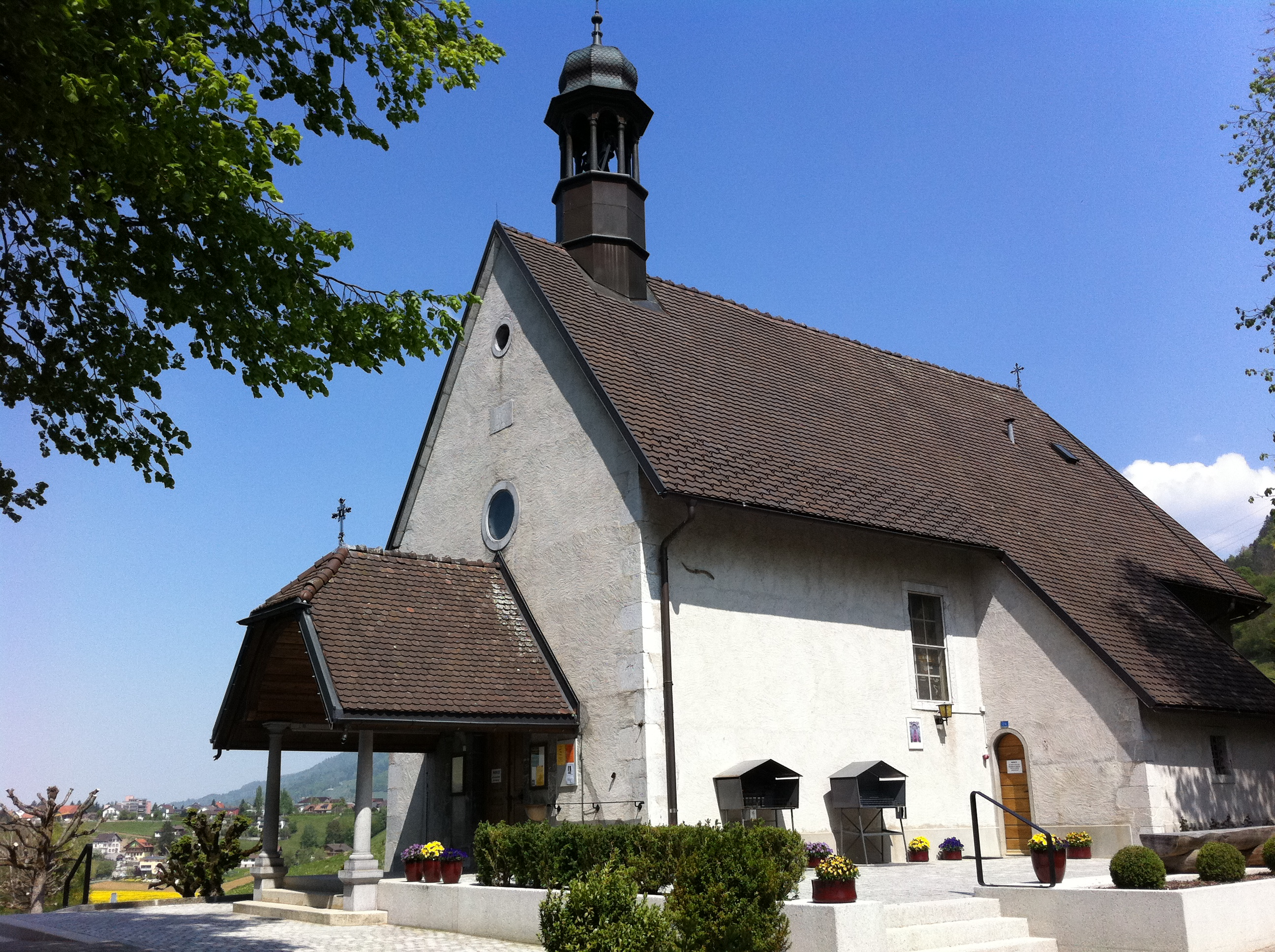
Notre-Dame des Marches Chapel

== Politics ==
In the 2011 federal election, the most popular party was the SP, which received 29.9% of the vote. The next three most popular parties were the SVP (21.0%), the CVP (20.7%) and the FDP (15.8%).

The SPS received about the same percentage of the vote as they did in the 2007 Federal election (28.6% in 2007 vs 29.9% in 2011). The SVP moved from fourth in 2007 (with 18.6%) to second in 2011, the CVP moved from second in 2007 (with 24.9%) to third and the FDP moved from third in 2007 (with 19.5%) to fourth. A total of 615 votes were cast in this election, of which 13 or 2.1% were invalid.

== Economy ==
As of 2010, Broc had an unemployment rate of 4.5%. As of 2008; there were 23 people employed in the primary economic sector and about 9 businesses involved in this sector; 481 people were employed in the secondary sector and there were 19 businesses in this sector. 292 people were employed in the tertiary sector, with 48 businesses in this sector. 970 residents of the municipality were employed in some capacity, of which females made up 42.2% of the workforce.

In 2008 the total number of full-time equivalent jobs was 698. The number of jobs in the primary sector was 18, of which 15 were in agriculture and 3 were in forestry or lumber production. The number of jobs in the secondary sector was 465 of which 415 or (89.2%) were in manufacturing and 19 (4.1%) were in construction. The number of jobs in the tertiary sector was 215. In the tertiary sector; 55 or 25.6% were in wholesale or retail sales or the repair of motor vehicles, 8 or 3.7% were in the movement and storage of goods, 38 or 17.7% were in a hotel or restaurant, 1 was in the information industry, 1 was the insurance or financial industry, 16 or 7.4% were in education and 56 or 26.0% were in health care.

In 2000, 592 workers commuted into the municipality and 592 workers commuted away. The municipality is a net exporter of workers, with about 1.0 workers leaving the municipality for every one entering. Of the working population, 9.5% used public transportation to get to work, and 67.6% used a private car.

== Transport ==
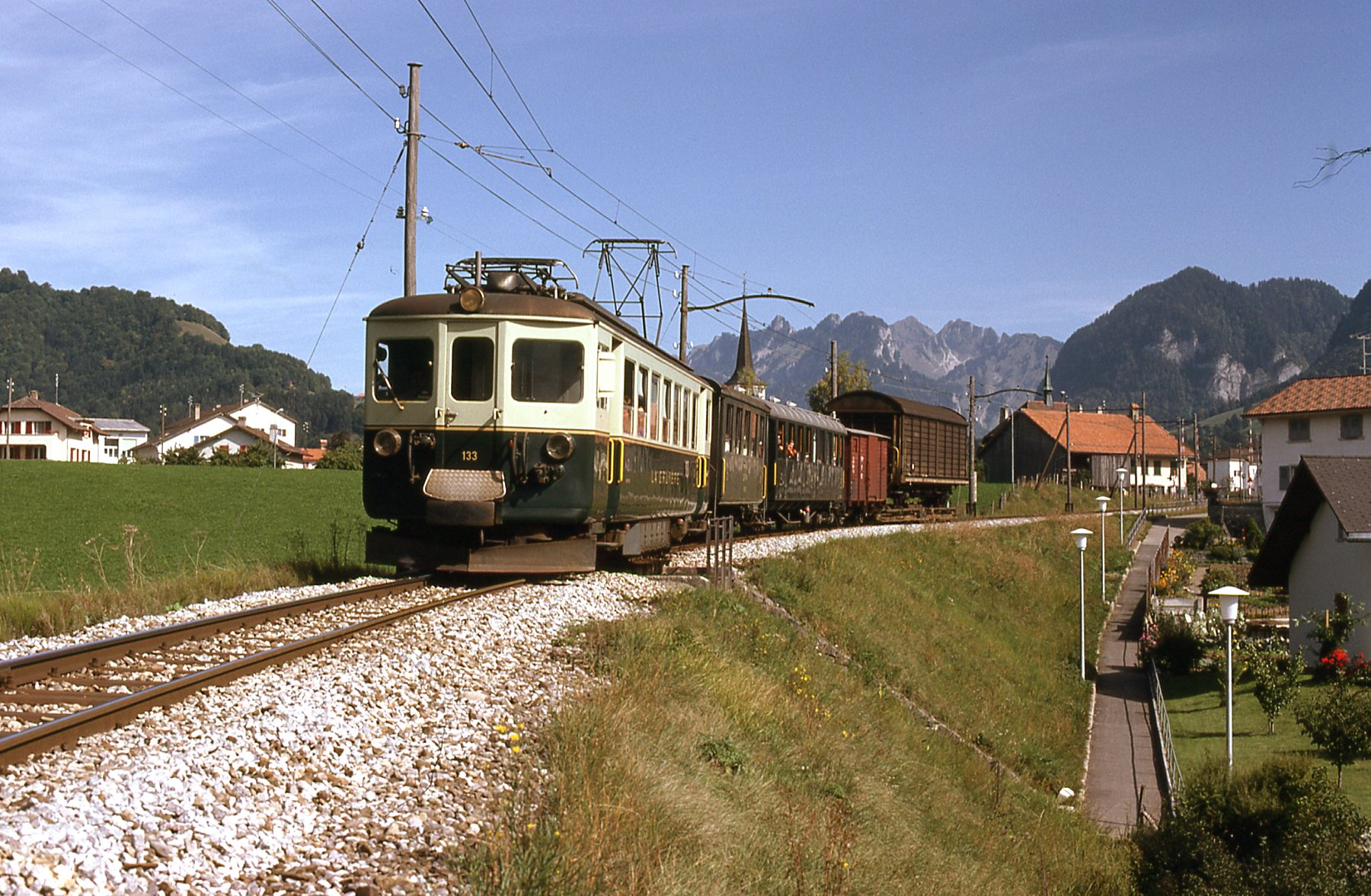
A train on the Bulle–Broc railway line in 2010

Broc has two stations on the Bulle–Broc railway line: Broc-Chocolaterie and Broc-Village. RER Fribourg services operate from Broc to Bern via Bulle. Transports publics Fribourgeois operates bus services as well.

== Religion ==
From the 2000 census, 1,662 or 80.4% were Roman Catholic, while 86 or 4.2% belonged to the Swiss Reformed Church. Of the rest of the population, there were 9 members of an Orthodox church (or about 0.44% of the population), there was 1 individual who belongs to the Christian Catholic Church, and there were 36 individuals (or about 1.74% of the population) who belonged to another Christian church. There were 67 (or about 3.24% of the population) who were Islamic. 13 individuals were Buddhist, 3 individuals were Hindu and 3 individuals belonged to another church. 73 (or about 3.53% of the population) belonged to no church, are agnostic or atheist, and 131 individuals (or about 6.33% of the population) did not answer the question.

== Education ==
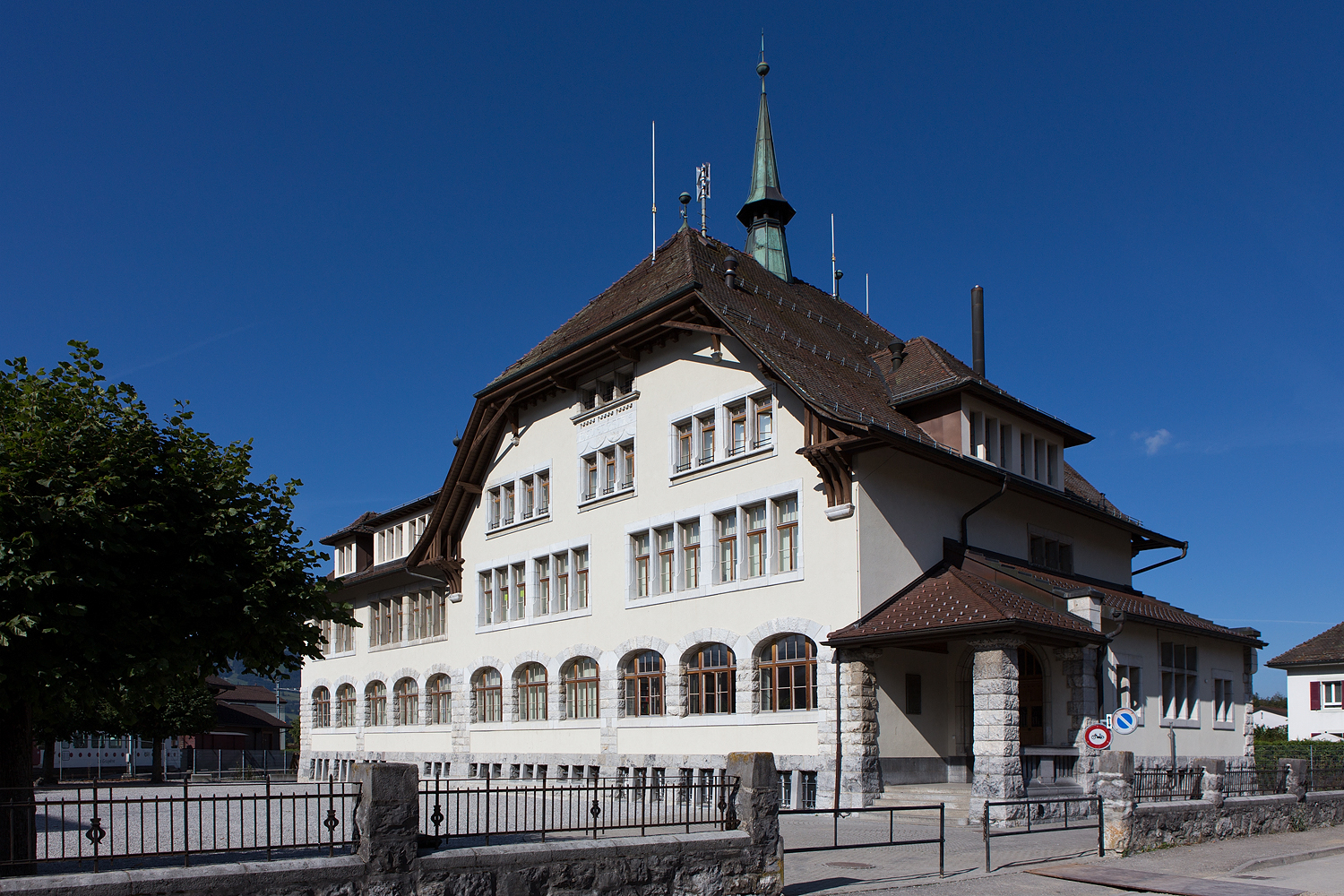
Main school of Broc

In Broc about 615 or (29.7%) of the population have completed non-mandatory upper secondary education, and 150 or (7.3%) have completed additional higher education (either university or a Fachhochschule). Of the 150 who completed tertiary schooling, 65.3% were Swiss men, 22.7% were Swiss women, 8.0% were non-Swiss men and 4.0% were non-Swiss women.

The Canton of Fribourg school system provides one year of non-obligatory Kindergarten, followed by six years of Primary school. This is followed by three years of obligatory lower Secondary school where the students are separated according to ability and aptitude. Following the lower Secondary students may attend a three- or four-year optional upper Secondary school. The upper Secondary school is divided into gymnasium (university preparatory) and vocational programs. After they finish the upper Secondary program, students may choose to attend a Tertiary school or continue their apprenticeship.

During the 2010-11 school year, there were a total of 274 students attending 14 classes in Broc. A total of 426 students from the municipality attended any school, either in the municipality or outside of it. There were 4 kindergarten classes with a total of 79 students in the municipality. The municipality had 10 primary classes and 195 students. During the same year, there were no lower secondary classes in the municipality, but 84 students attended lower secondary school in a neighboring municipality. There were no upper Secondary classes or vocational classes, but there were 29 upper Secondary students and 69 upper Secondary vocational students who attended classes in another municipality. The municipality had no non-university Tertiary classes, but there were 5 non-university Tertiary students and 10 specialized Tertiary students who attended classes in another municipality.

As of 2000, 40 students in Broc came from another municipality, while 160 residents attended schools outside the municipality.

== Notable people ==
- Gjon's Tears (born 1998), singer
