= Bulle–Romont railway line =

Railway line in Switzerland

Bulle–Romont

Overview
- Owner: Transports publics Fribourgeois
- Line number: 254
- Termini: Bulle; Romont FR

History
- Opened: 1 July 1868

Technical
- Line length: 18.2 km (11.3 mi)
- Track gauge: 1,435 mm (4 ft 8 1/2 in) standard gauge
- Electrification: 15 kV/16.7 Hz AC overhead catenary
- Maximum incline: 2.5%

The Bulle–Romont railway line is a standard gauge railway line in the canton of Fribourg, Switzerland. It runs 18.2 kilometres (11.3 mi) from Bulle to Romont FR. The line is owned and operated by Transports publics Fribourgeois (TPF).

== History ==
The Chemin de fer Bulle–Romont (BR) opened the line between Bulle and Romont on 1 July 1868. The line was electrified on 8 May 1946.

In 1942, the BR merged with two other companies to form the Chemins de fer fribourgeois Gruyère–Fribourg–Morat (GFM). The GFM, in turn, became the Transports publics Fribourgeois (TPF) in 2000.
