= Villaz-St-Pierre railway station =

Railway station in Villaz, Switzerland

Villaz-St-Pierre
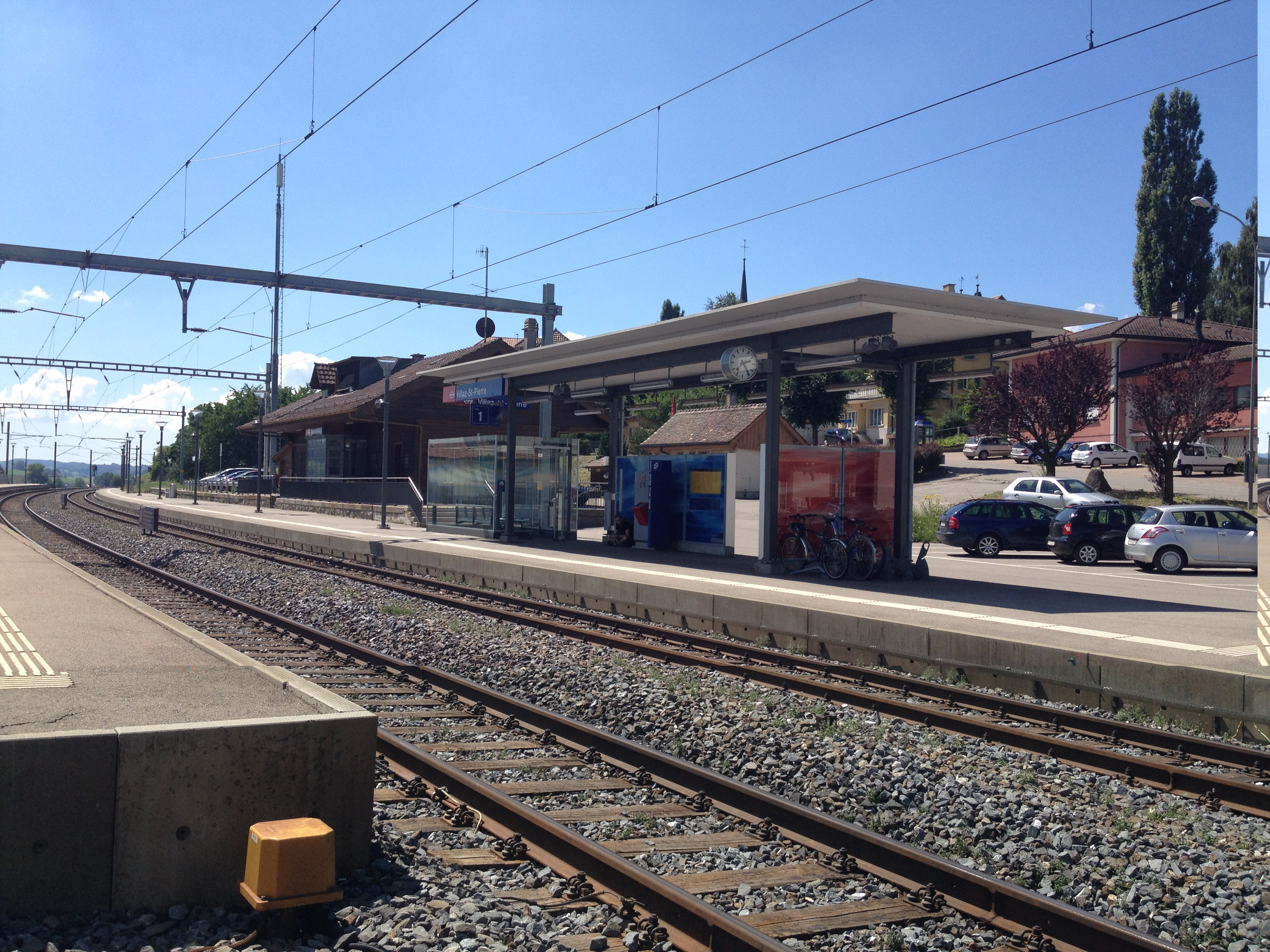
- The station in 2013

General information
- Location: Villaz; Switzerland
- Coordinates: 46°43′14″N 6°57′38″E
- Elevation: 706 m (2,316 ft)
- Owner: Swiss Federal Railways
- Line: Lausanne–Bern line
- Distance: 45.0 km (28.0 mi) from Lausanne
- Platforms: 2 (2 side platforms)
- Tracks: 2
- Train operators: Swiss Federal Railways
- Connections: CarPostal SA bus line; Transports publics Fribourgeois bus line

Construction
- Parking: Yes (25 spaces)
- Cycle facilities: Yes
- Accessible: Yes

Other information
- Station code: 8504024 (VZ)
- Fare zone: 36 (frimobil)

Passengers
- 2018: 360 per weekday (SBB)

Services
Preceding station	RER Fribourg	Following station
Romont FR towards Lausanne	S40	Chénens towards Fribourg/Freiburg
Romont FR towards Lausanne	S41	Chénens towards Fribourg/Freiburg
Location

Villaz-St-Pierre railway station (French: Gare de Villaz-St-Pierre, German: Bahnhof Villaz-St-Pierre) is a railway station in the municipality of Villaz, in the Swiss canton of Fribourg. It is an intermediate stop on the standard gauge Lausanne–Bern line of Swiss Federal Railways.

== Services ==
As of the December 2024 timetable change, the following services stop at Villaz-St-Pierre:

- RER Fribourg S40 / S41: half-hourly service between Lausanne and Fribourg/Freiburg.
