= Neyruz FR railway station =

Railway station in Neyruz, Switzerland

Neyruz FR
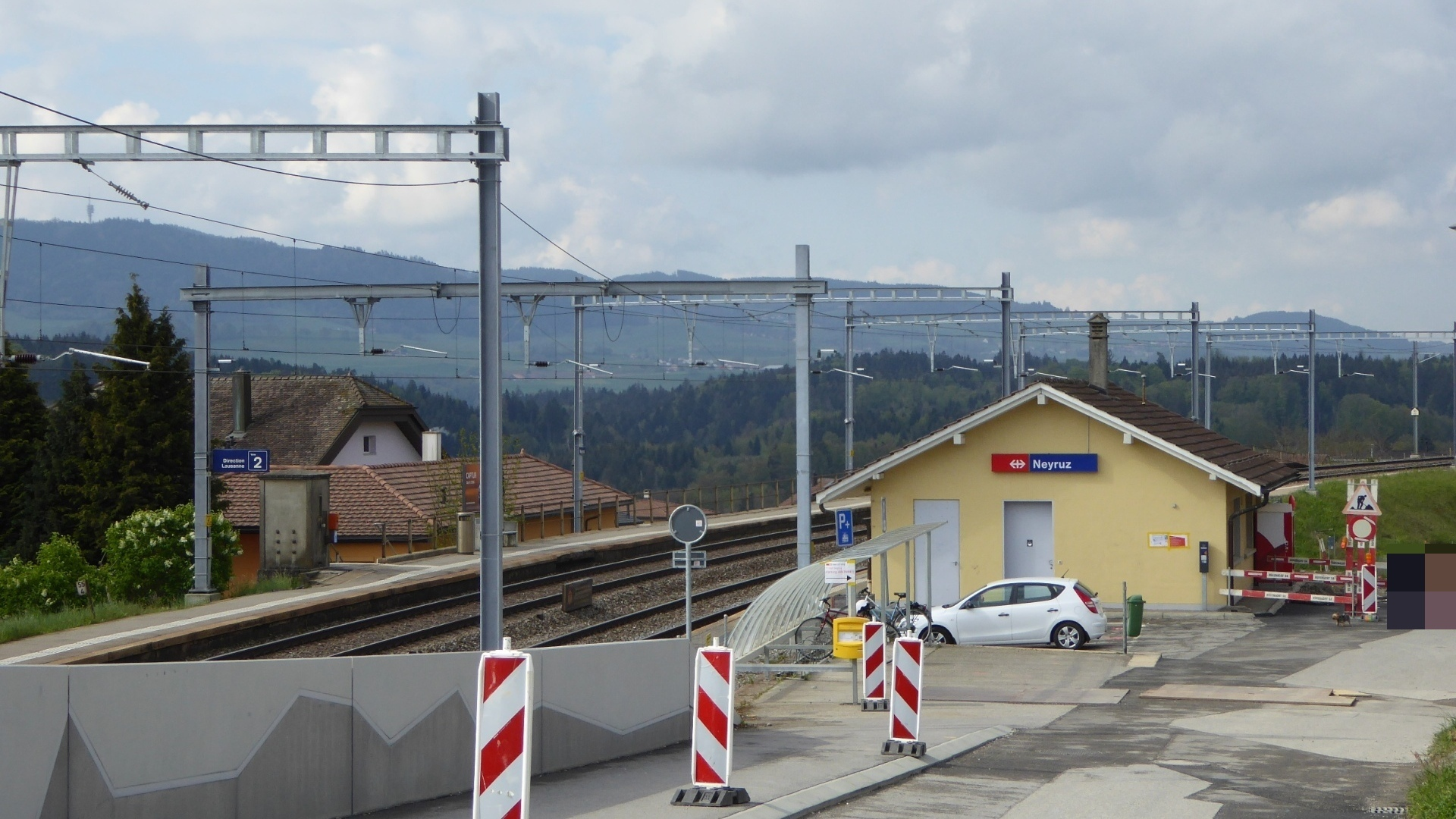
- The station in 2019

General information
- Location: Neyruz; Switzerland
- Coordinates: 46°45′58″N 7°03′54″E
- Elevation: 687 m (2,254 ft)
- Owner: Swiss Federal Railways
- Line: Lausanne–Bern line
- Distance: 55.4 km (34.4 mi) from Lausanne
- Platforms: 2 (2 side platforms)
- Tracks: 2
- Train operators: Swiss Federal Railways

Construction
- Parking: Yes (11 spaces)
- Cycle facilities: Yes (24 spaces)
- Accessible: No

Other information
- Station code: 8504027 (NEY)
- Fare zone: 35 (frimobil)

Passengers
- 2018: 640 per weekday (SBB)

Services
Preceding station	RER Fribourg	Following station
Cottens FR towards Lausanne	S40	Avry-Matran towards Fribourg/Freiburg
Cottens FR towards Lausanne	S41	Avry-Matran towards Fribourg/Freiburg
Location

Neyruz FR railway station (French: Gare de Neyruz FR, German: Bahnhof Neyruz FR) is a railway station in the municipality of Neyruz, in the Swiss canton of Fribourg. It is an intermediate stop on the standard gauge Lausanne–Bern line of Swiss Federal Railways.

== Services ==
As of the December 2024 timetable change, the following services stop at Neyruz FR:

- RER Fribourg S40 / S41: half-hourly service between Lausanne and Fribourg/Freiburg.
