= Bulle–Broc railway line =

Swiss railway line

Bulle–Broc
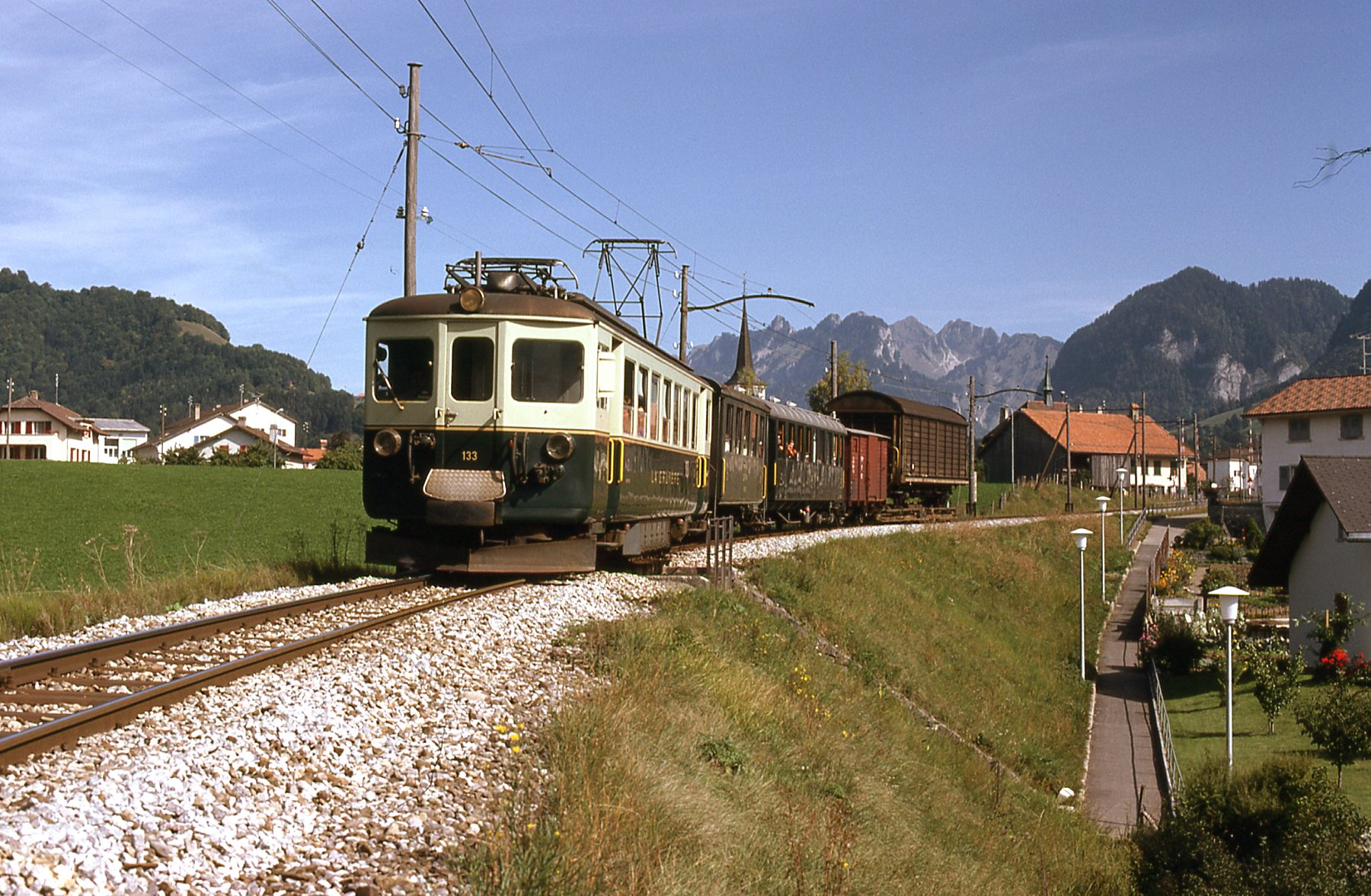
- The line crossing the town of Broc

Overview
- Owner: Transports publics Fribourgeois
- Line number: 256

History
- Opened: 24 June 1912
- Closed for regauging: April 2021
- Reopened: 24 August 2023

Technical
- Line length: 5.4 km (3.4 mi)
- Track gauge: 1,435 mm (4 ft 8 1/2 in) standard gauge
- Old gauge: 1,000 mm (3 ft 3 3/8 in) metre gauge

The Bulle–Broc railway line is a railway line in the canton of Fribourg, Switzerland. It runs 5.4 kilometres (3.4 mi) from Bulle to Broc-Chocolaterie. It was built in 1912 by the Chemins de fer électriques de la Gruyère (CEG) as a branch from the Palézieux–Bulle–Montbovon railway line. Both lines were 1,000 mm (3 ft 3 3/8 in) metre gauge. Transports publics Fribourgeois (TPF) closed the line from 2021–2023 for rebuilding as a standard gauge line.

== History ==
The Chemins de fer électriques de la Gruyère constructed the branch line in 1912, with the section from Bulle to Les Marches opening on 29 January and from Les Marches to Broc on 24 June. In 1942, the CEG merged with two other companies to form the Chemins de fer fribourgeois Gruyère–Fribourg–Morat (GFM). The GFM, in turn, became the Transports publics Fribourgeois (TPF) in 2000.

Two stations were renamed with the 2017 timetable change: La Tour-Village became La Tour-de-Trême while Epagny became La Tour-de-Trême Parqueterie. The station formerly known as La Tour-de-Trême on the Palézieux–Bulle–Montbovon line became La Tour-de-Trême Ronclina.

TPF closed the line in April 2021 to permit a complete rebuilding and conversion to standard gauge. The change of gauge allowed through operation of trains to and from Romont FR. In addition, the stations of La Tour-de-Trême, Broc-Village, and Broc-Fabrique were rebuilt for better handicapped access. Two other stations, La Tour-de-Trême Parqueterie and Les Marches, were closed. The line reopened on 24 August 2023. Broc-Fabrique was renamed Broc-Chocolaterie in December 2023 to emphasize the adjacent Cailler chocolate factory.
