= Vuadens-Sud railway station =

Railway station in Vuadens, Switzerland

Vuadens-Sud
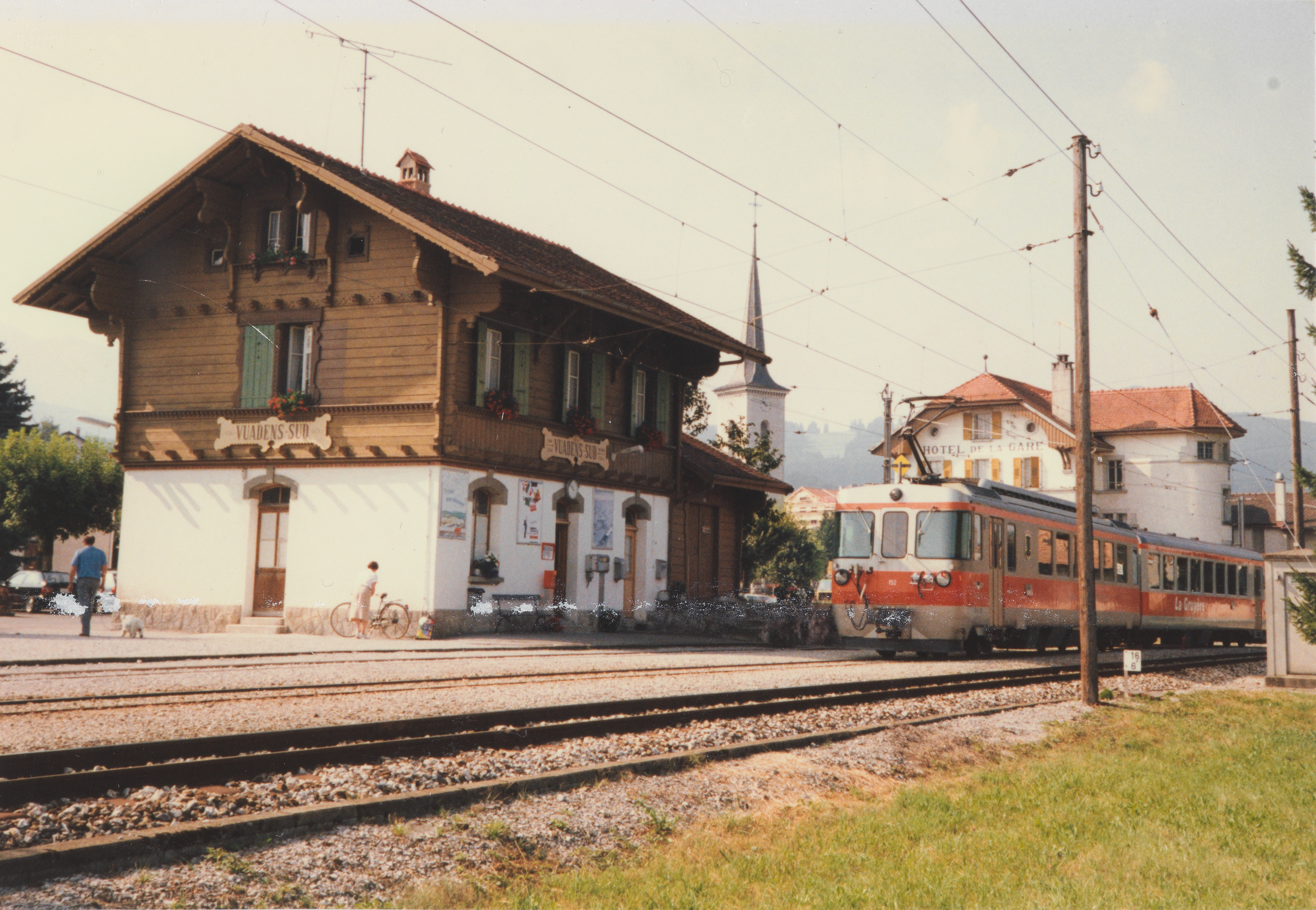
- The station in 1991

General information
- Location: Vuadens, Fribourg; Switzerland
- Coordinates: 46°37′05″N 7°01′12″E
- Elevation: 803 m (2,635 ft)
- Owner: Transports publics Fribourgeois
- Line: Palézieux–Bulle–Montbovon line
- Distance: 16.6 km (10.3 mi) from Châtel-St-Denis
- Platforms: 1 (1 side platform)
- Tracks: 1
- Train operators: Transports publics Fribourgeois
- Connections: tpf buses

Construction
- Parking: Yes (2 spaces)
- Accessible: Yes

Other information
- Station code: 8504066 (VUA)
- Fare zone: 30 (frimobil)

History
- Opened: 23 July 1903

Services
Preceding station	RER Fribourg	Following station
Vaulruz-Sud towards Palézieux	S50	Bulle towards Montbovon
Vaulruz-Sud towards Palézieux	S51	Bulle towards Gruyères
Location

Vuadens-Sud railway station (French: Gare de Vuadens-Sud), is a railway station in the municipality of Vuadens, in the Swiss canton of Fribourg. It is an intermediate stop on the 1,000 mm (3 ft 3 3/8 in) metre gauge Palézieux–Bulle–Montbovon railway line of Transports publics Fribourgeois.

== Services ==
As of the December 2024 timetable change, the following services stop at Vuadens-Sud:

- RER Fribourg S50 / S51: half-hourly service on weekdays and hourly service on weekends between Palézieux and Gruyères and hourly service from Gruyères to Montbovon.

== Bibliography ==
- Wägli, Hans G.; Jacobi, Sébastien (2010). Schienennetz Schweiz - Bahnprofil Schweiz CH+ [Swiss rail network] (in German) (3rd ed.). Zürich: AS Verlag. ISBN 978-3-909111-74-9.
