= Chemins de fer fribourgeois Gruyère–Fribourg–Morat =

Swiss railway company

Overview
- Dates of operation: 1942–2000
- Predecessors: Bulle-Romont-Bahn; Chemin de fer Fribourg–Morat–Anet; Chemins de fer électriques de la Gruyère
- Successor: Transports Publics Fribourgeois

The Chemins de fer fribourgeois Gruyère–Fribourg–Morat (GFM) was a railway company in Switzerland. It was established with the merger in 1942 of two standard gauge and one 1,000 mm (3 ft 3 3/8 in) gauge railways running mainly within the Swiss canton of Fribourg. It was officially called the Compagnie des Chemins de fer fribourgeois ("Fribourg Railway Company"). The company also operated numerous regional buses in the same area. After a merger with Fribourg city transport, the company was renamed Transports publics fribourgeois/Freiburgische Verkehrsbetriebe (TPF).

The company was created on 1 January 1942 from the merger of metre-gauge Chemins de fer électriques de la Gruyère ("Electric Railways of the Gruyère"; CEG), the standard-gauge Fribourg-Ins Railway (Chemin de fer Fribourg–Morat–Anet; FMA) and the also standard gauge Bulle-Romont Railway (Bulle-Romont-Bahn; BR). On 1 January 2000, the GFM merged with the Transport en commun de Fribourg (Friborg Community Transport; TF) to form Transports Publics Fribourgeois (TPF).

== Metre-gauge lines ==
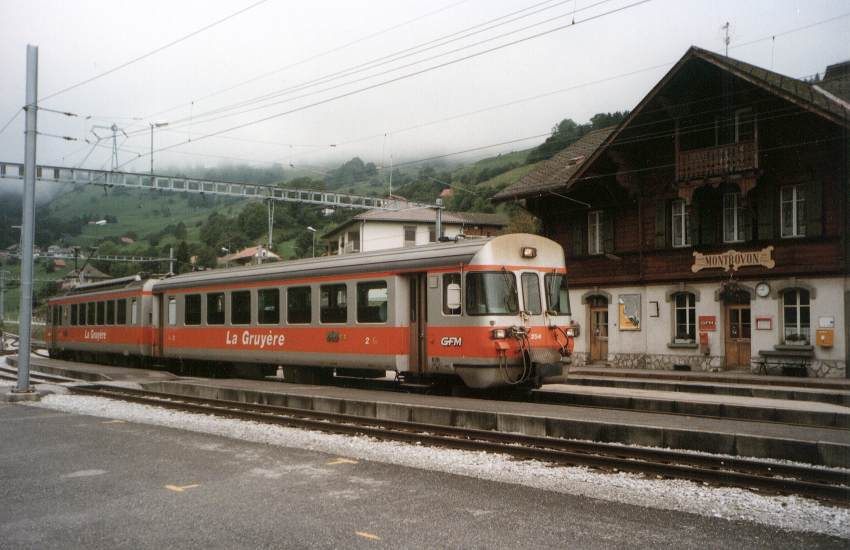
A push-pull train of the GFM in Montbovon (Be 4/4 151 and control car Bt 254)

The narrow gauge network of the GFM was about 48 km long and has a gauge of 1000 mm and has been electrified since its opening.

Bulle was the centre of operations with depot, workshops and, within its modern station, the connection between the metre and standard gauge lines as well as many bus lines. The GFM had a connection in Montbovon to the metre-gauge network of the Montreux Oberland Bernois Railway (German: Montreux-Berner-Oberland-Bahn; MOB), which allows the exchange of rolling stock. Until 1969, Châtel-St-Denis was also reached by a line of the CEV from Vevey.

The first section from Châtel-Saint-Denis to Palézieux was commissioned by the Chemin de fer Châtel–Palézieux (Châtel–Palézieux Railway; CP) in 1901. Another railway company was established, initially called the Chemin de fer Châtel–Bulle–Montbovon (CBM), but called the Chemins de fer Electriques de la Gruyère (Electric Railway of the Gruyère; CEG) from 1902. It opened the line from Châtel-Saint-Denis via Bulle and Gruyères to Montbovon between 1903 and 1904. It took over the CP in 1907. A branch line was opened in 1912 from Bulle to Broc, where it connects to the Cailler (now Nestlé) chocolate factory. The originally planned extension of this line to Fribourg was not built because of the First World War. After the opening of the motorway in the late 1970s, a high-speed bus route was established on the route between Bulle and Fribourg, which operated until 2011.

== Fribourg-Ins Railway ==
The Fribourg–Ins railway (Chemin de fer Fribourg–Morat–Anet) is a 32 km-long standard-gauge line from Fribourg via Murten (French: Morat) to Ins (French: Anet). The former Chemin de fer Fribourg–Morat company opened the section from a junction on the Fribourg–Yverdon railway at Givisiez to Murten on 23 August 1898. The operations was carried out with rolling stock and personnel of the Jura–Simplon Railways (JS). In 1901, the company changed its name to the Compagnie du Chemin de fer Fribourg–Morat–Anet. The construction of the Muntelier-Löwenberg–Ins extension began in February and operations started on 1 May 1903. The entire railway line was electrified with a side-contact third rail system, using direct current, on 23 July 1903. Over the years, the FMA used voltages between 750 and 900 volts. With the progressive electrification of the surrounding SBB lines, the FMA was finally re-electrified with alternating current supplied via overhead line. Operations commenced under 15 kV 16 2/3 Hz on 12 August 1947.

== Bulle–Romont line ==
The Bulle–Romont railway line was the oldest part of the entire network. The Chemin de fer Bulle–Romont opened the line between Romont to Bulle on 1 July 1868. Romont was a station on the Lausanne–Fribourg–Bern Railway (LFB), which was opened on 4 September 1862 and is now part of the SBB. The railway initially had no own rolling stock, but contracted its management to the LFB and its successor. It was not until 1929 that the stations were opened; passenger operations, for which two steam locomotives and three passenger coaches were acquired from other railways, commencing in 1934. After the merger, which was mainly intended to obtain federal subsidies under the Privatbahnhilfegesetz (private railways assistance act), electrification was tackled and electrical operations commenced on 8 May 1946.
