= Romont FR railway station =

Railway station in Romont, Canton of Fribourg, Switzerland

Romont FR
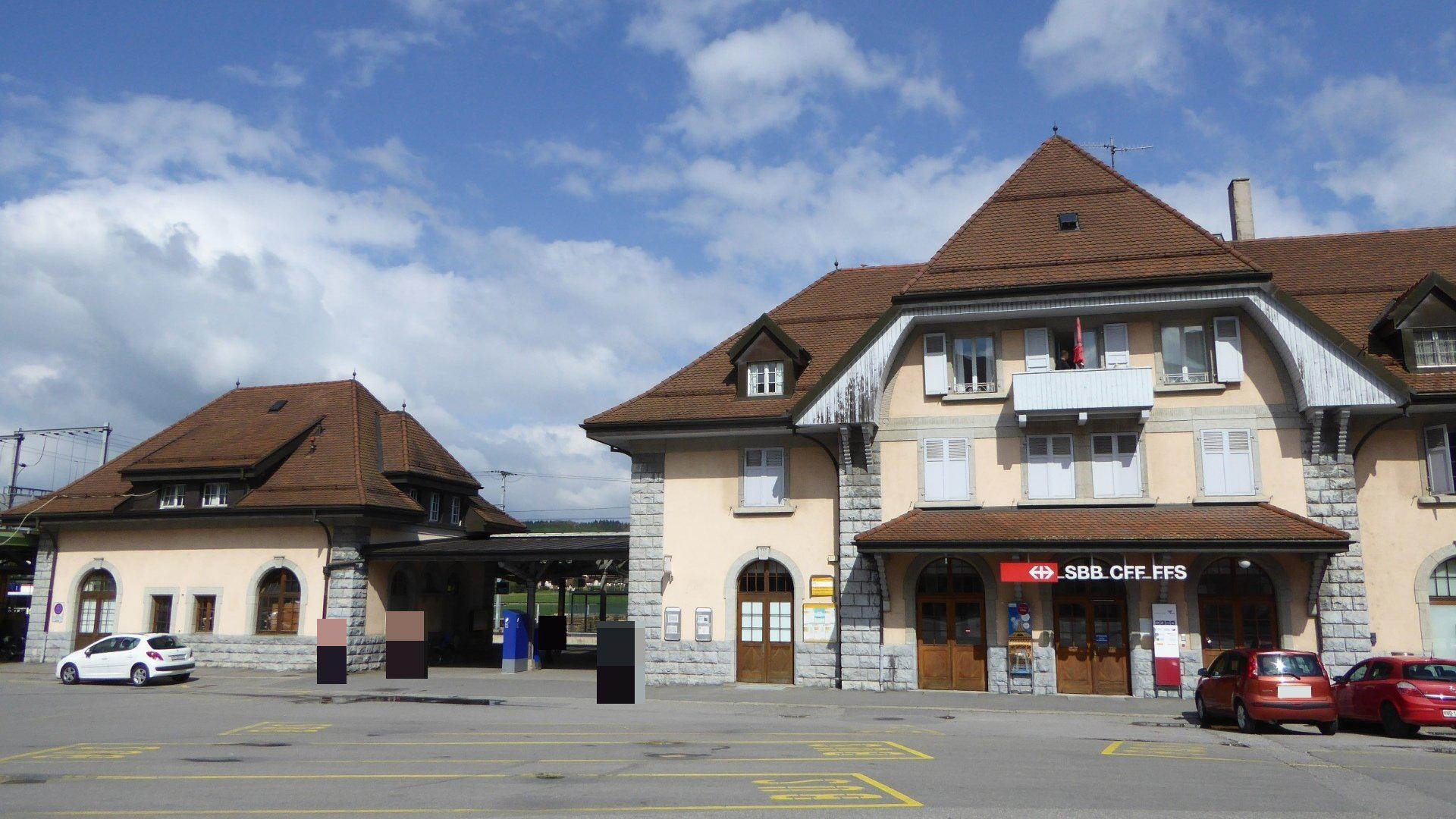
- The station building in 2018

General information
- Location: Romont; Switzerland
- Coordinates: 46°41′38″N 6°54′43″E
- Elevation: 707 m (2,320 ft)
- Owner: Swiss Federal Railways
- Lines: Bulle–Romont line; Lausanne–Bern line
- Distance: 40.2 km (25.0 mi) from Lausanne
- Platforms: 5: 1 side platform; 2 island platforms
- Tracks: 6
- Train operators: Swiss Federal Railways; Transports publics Fribourgeois
- Connections: CarPostal SA buses; Transports publics Fribourgeois buses

Construction
- Cycle facilities: Yes
- Accessible: Yes

Other information
- Station code: 8504023 (ROM)
- Fare zone: 44 (frimobil)

Passengers
- 2023: 5,700 per weekday (RegionAlps, SBB, TPF)

Services
Preceding station	SBB CFF FFS	Following station
Palézieux towards Geneva Airport	IR 15	Fribourg/Freiburg towards Lucerne
Palézieux towards Le Châble VS	VosAlpes Express	Fribourg/Freiburg Terminus
Preceding station	RER Fribourg	Following station
Bulle towards Broc-Chocolaterie	RE2	Fribourg/Freiburg towards Bern
Bulle towards Broc-Chocolaterie	RE3	Fribourg/Freiburg towards Düdingen
Vauderens towards Lausanne	S40	Villaz-St-Pierre towards Fribourg/Freiburg
Oron towards Lausanne	S41	Villaz-St-Pierre towards Fribourg/Freiburg
Location

Romont FR railway station (French: Gare de Romont FR, German: Bahnhof Romont FR) is a railway station in the municipality of Romont, in the Swiss canton of Fribourg. It is located at the junction of the standard gauge Lausanne–Bern line of Swiss Federal Railways and the Bulle–Romont line of Transports publics Fribourgeois.

== Services ==
As of the December 2024 timetable change, the following services stop at Romont FR:

- InterRegio: hourly service between Geneva Airport and Lucerne.
- VosAlpes Express: daily direct service between Le Châble VS and Fribourg/Freiburg on weekends between December and April.
- RER Fribourg:
  - RE2 / RE3: half-hourly service between Düdingen and Broc-Chocolaterie and hourly service from Düdingen to Bern.
  - S40 / S41: half-hourly service between Lausanne and Fribourg/Freiburg.
