= Bulle railway station =

Railway station in Bulle, Switzerland

Bulle
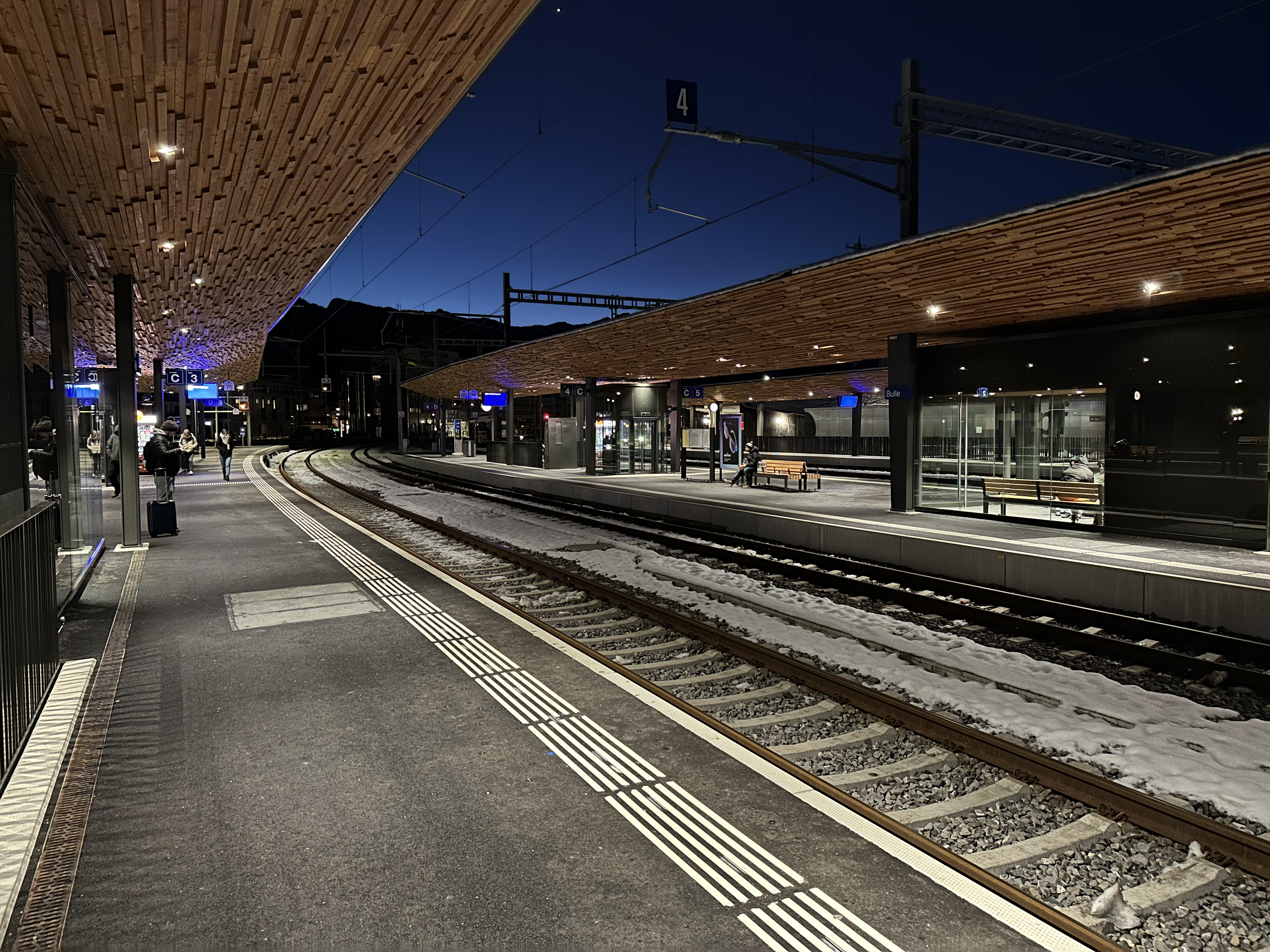
- The station platforms in 2023

General information
- Location: Bulle, Fribourg; Switzerland
- Coordinates: 46°37′05″N 7°03′18″E
- Elevation: 771 m (2,530 ft)
- Owner: Transports publics Fribourgeois
- Lines: Bulle–Romont line; Bulle–Broc line; Palézieux–Bulle–Montbovon line
- Distance: 19.5 km (12.1 mi) from Châtel-St-Denis
- Platforms: 2 island platforms; 2 side platforms
- Tracks: 7
- Train operators: Transports publics Fribourgeois
- Connections: TPF buses

Construction
- Parking: Yes (94 spaces)
- Accessible: Yes

Other information
- Station code: 8504086 (BUL)
- Fare zone: 30 (frimobil)

Services
Preceding station	RER Fribourg	Following station
Romont FR towards Bern	RE2	La Tour-de-Trême towards Broc-Chocolaterie
Romont FR towards Düdingen	RE3	La Tour-de-Trême towards Broc-Chocolaterie
Vuadens-Sud towards Palézieux	S50	La Tour-de-Trême Ronclina towards Montbovon
Vuadens-Sud towards Palézieux	S51	La Tour-de-Trême Ronclina towards Gruyères
Location

Bulle railway station (French: Gare de Bulle, German: Bahnhof Bulle) is a railway station in the municipality of Bulle, in the Swiss canton of Fribourg. It is located at the junction of three railway lines: the Bulle–Romont, Bulle–Broc, and Palézieux–Bulle–Montbovon lines. All three are owned by Transports publics Fribourgeois.

== History ==
Prior to 2019, the station was located at the southern end of the Place de la Gare. The standard gauge Bulle–Romont railway line terminated at the station, while interchange was possible between the 1,000 mm (3 ft 3 3/8 in) gauge Bulle–Broc and Palézieux–Bulle–Montbovon lines. A major renovation project, completed in 2023, built a new station slightly to the north on Rue Rieter. As part of this project the Bulle–Broc was converted to standard gauge.

== Services ==
As of the December 2024 timetable change, the following services stop at Bulle:

- RER Fribourg:
  - RE2 / RE3: half-hourly service to Düdingen and Broc-Chocolaterie and hourly service to Bern.
  - S50 / S51: half-hourly service on weekdays and hourly service on weekends between Palézieux and Gruyères and hourly service from Gruyères to Montbovon.
