= Broc-Chocolaterie railway station =

Railway station in Broc, Switzerland

Broc-Chocolaterie
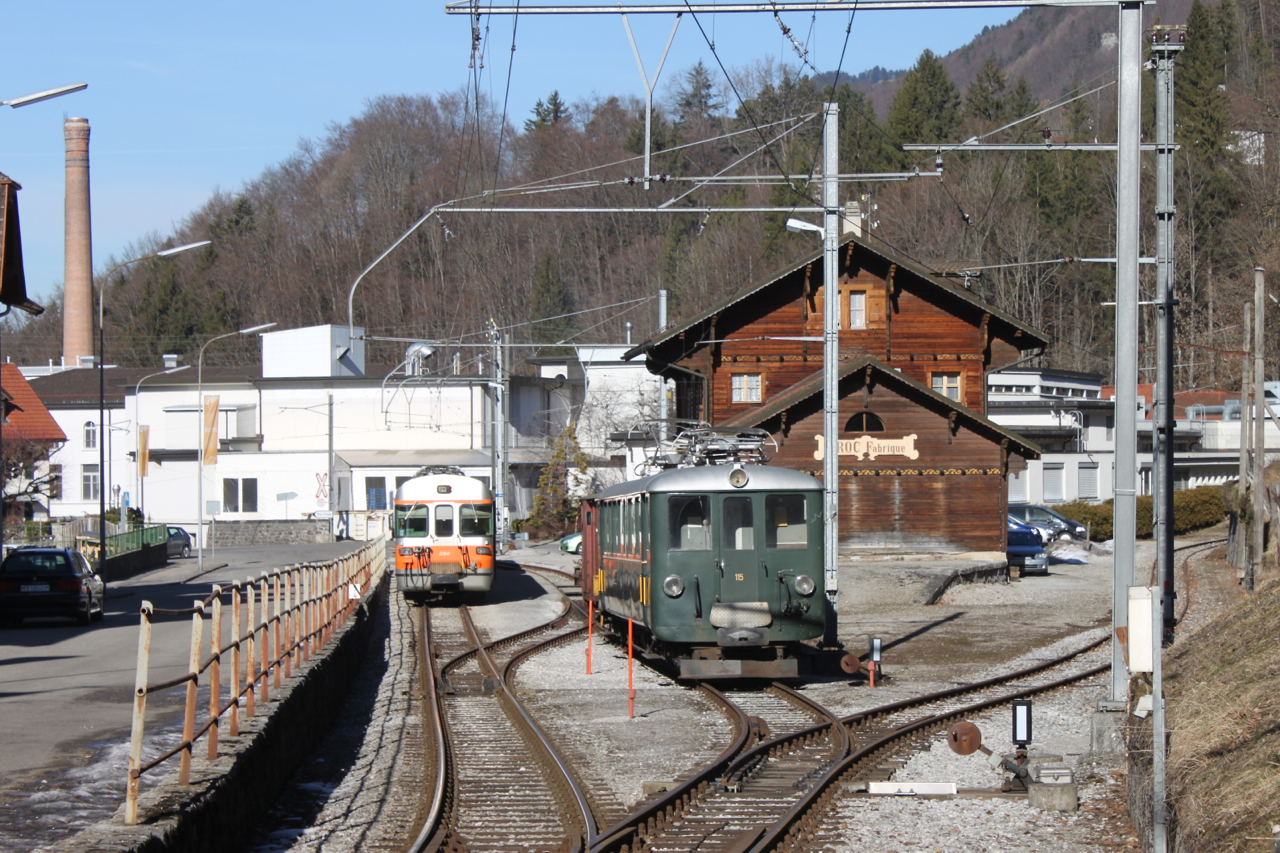
- Trains at Broc-Fabrique in 2011, prior to the rebuilding

General information
- Location: Broc, Fribourg; Switzerland
- Coordinates: 46°36′18″N 7°06′32″E
- Elevation: 689 m (2,260 ft)
- Owner: Transports publics Fribourgeois
- Line: Bulle–Broc railway line
- Distance: 5.4 km (3.4 mi) from Bulle
- Platforms: 2 (1 island platform)
- Tracks: 2
- Train operators: Transports publics Fribourgeois

Construction
- Accessible: Yes

Other information
- Station code: 8504089 (BROF)
- Fare zone: 31 (frimobil)

History
- Opened: 24 June 1912
- Former names: Broc-Fabrique

Services
Preceding station	RER Fribourg	Following station
Broc-Village towards Bern	RE2	Terminus
Broc-Village towards Düdingen	RE3	Terminus
Location

Broc-Chocolaterie railway station (French: Gare de Broc-Chocolaterie), formerly known as Broc-Fabrique, is a railway station in the municipality of Broc, in the Swiss canton of Fribourg. It takes its name from the adjacent Cailler chocolate factory. It is one of two stations in Broc. The other, Broc-Village, is located in the center of the village. Broc-Chocolaterie is the eastern terminus of the Bulle–Broc railway line.

== History ==
The Chemins de fer électriques de la Gruyère constructed the Bulle–Broc railway line in 1912. Broc opened on 24 June. The line was built as a 1,000 mm (3 ft 3 3/8 in) metre gauge line. The line and station were closed between April 2021 and 24 August 2023 for rebuilding as a 1,435 mm (4 ft 8 1/2 in) standard gauge line. This permitted direct operation to via Fribourg/Freiburg to Bern. The line reopened on 24 August 2023. As part of the project the station was rebuilt to be accessible, with a new 150 metres (490 ft) platform.

The station was renamed Broc-Chocolaterie in December 2023 to emphasize the adjacent Cailler chocolate factory.

== Services ==
As of the December 2024 timetable change, the following services stop at Broc-Chocolaterie:

- RER Fribourg RE2 / RE3: half-hourly service to Düdingen and hourly service to Bern.
