= Düdingen railway station =

Railway station in Düdingen, Switzerland

Düdingen
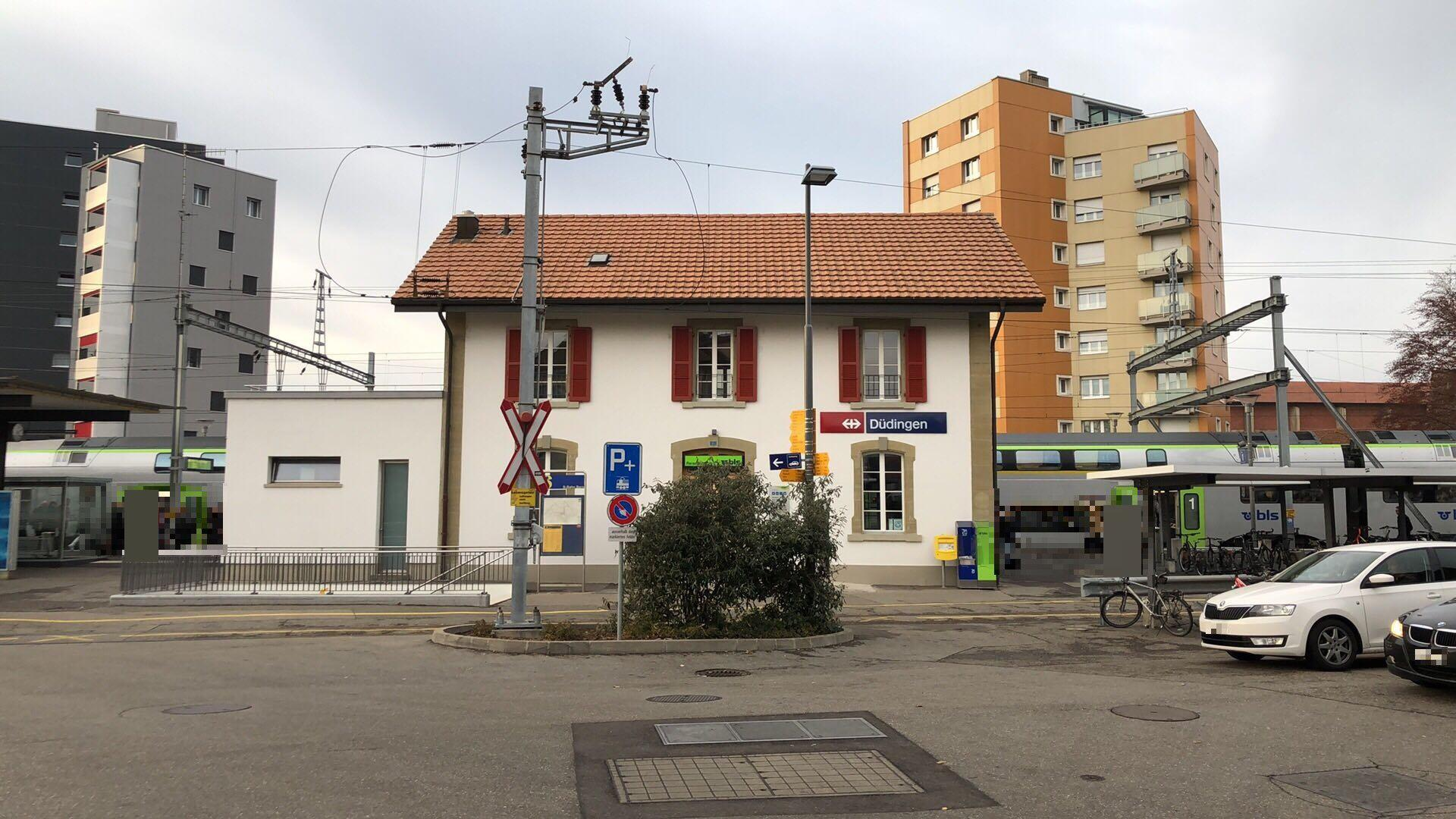
- The station building in 2018

General information
- Location: Düdingen; Switzerland
- Coordinates: 46°51′04″N 7°11′23″E
- Elevation: 595 m (1,952 ft)
- Owner: Swiss Federal Railways
- Line: Lausanne–Bern line
- Distance: 72.2 km (44.9 mi) from Lausanne
- Platforms: 2 side platforms
- Tracks: 2
- Train operators: BLS AG; Transports publics Fribourgeois
- Connections: PostAuto AG; tpf buses

Construction
- Parking: Yes
- Cycle facilities: Yes (161 spaces)
- Accessible: Yes

Other information
- Station code: 8504101 (DUED)
- Fare zone: 11 and 12 (frimobil)

Passengers
- 2023: 4'100 per weekday (BLS, SBB, TPF)

Services
Preceding station	RER Fribourg	Following station
Fribourg/Freiburg towards Broc-Chocolaterie	RE2	Flamatt towards Bern
Fribourg/Freiburg towards Broc-Chocolaterie	RE2	Bern One-way operation
Fribourg/Freiburg towards Broc-Chocolaterie	RE3	Terminus
Preceding station	Bern S-Bahn	Following station
Fribourg/Freiburg Poya towards Fribourg/Freiburg	S1	Schmitten FR towards Thun
Location

Düdingen railway station (German: Bahnhof Düdingen, French: Gare de Guin) is a railway station in the municipality of Düdingen, in the Swiss canton of Fribourg. It is an intermediate stop on the standard gauge Lausanne–Bern line of Swiss Federal Railways.

== Services ==
As of the December 2024 timetable change, the following services stop at Düdingen:

- RER Fribourg RE2 / RE3: half-hourly service to Broc-Chocolaterie and hourly service to Bern.
- Bern S-Bahn S1: half-hourly service between Fribourg/Freiburg and Thun.
