= Lausanne–Bern railway =

Railway line in Switzerland

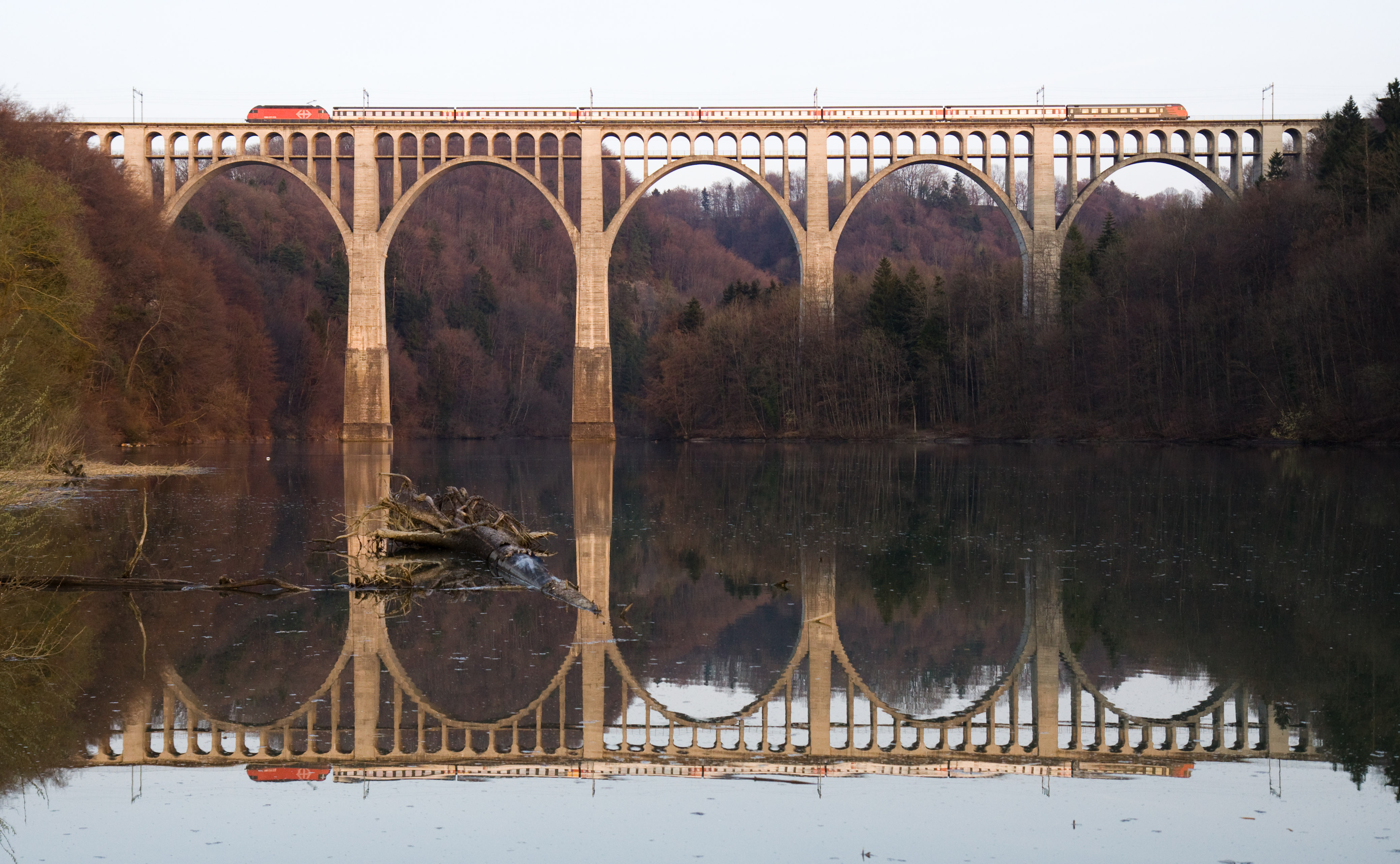
- An EW IV commuter train on the Grandfey Viaduct

Overview
- Termini: Lausanne; Bern

Technical
- Line length: 97.2 km (60.4 mi)
- Number of tracks: 2
- Track gauge: 1,435 mm (4 ft 8 1/2 in)
- Electrification: 15 kV/16.7 Hz AC overhead catenary
- Operating speed: 140 km/h (87 mph)

The Lausanne–Bern railway is a mainline railway in Switzerland. The first part of the line was opened in 1860 and the original line was completed on 4 September 1862. The line was built by the Swiss Central Railway and the Lausanne–Fribourg–Bern Railway, which were taken over by the Swiss Federal Railways on its establishment in 1902.

== History ==
The Canton of Fribourg delayed the construction of the line from Bern to Lausanne in a bid to have it run through the city of Fribourg rather than on flatter land further west; in 1857 the Swiss government, the canton of Vaud and the West Switzerland Company gave in, allowing construction to commence on the line. On 2 July 1860, the line opened from Bern to the northern end of the 352 metre-long Grandfey Viaduct being built over the Saane river in Balliswil, near Fribourg. The Bern–Thörishaus section was built by the Swiss Central Railway and the Thörishaus–Ballenwil section by the Lausanne–Fribourg–Bern Railway (French: Chemin de fer Lausanne-Fribourg-Berne, LFB). It took another two years of hard work to complete the Grandfey Viaduct before the line from Fribourg and Lausanne was open to traffic. Two rail tracks were consistently open to traffic from Olten to Lausanne from 4 September 1862. The line was taken over by the Swiss Federal Railways on its establishment in 1902.

== Operations ==
The Lausanne–Bern railway is an important part of the connection from Luzern and Zürich to Geneva. It serves both long-distance and local traffic.

The line between Bern and Fribourg is used by line S1 of the Bern S-Bahn. The line from Palézieux to Lausanne is to be used by line 2 and line 4 of the planned Léman Express.

An attempt is currently being made to reduce the traveling time of the InterCity trains between Lausanne and Bern to 55 minutes by using a tilt compensation system in order to be able to integrate Lausanne as a hub in the regular interval timetable.
