= La Verrerie railway station =

Railway station in Semsales, Switzerland

La Verrerie
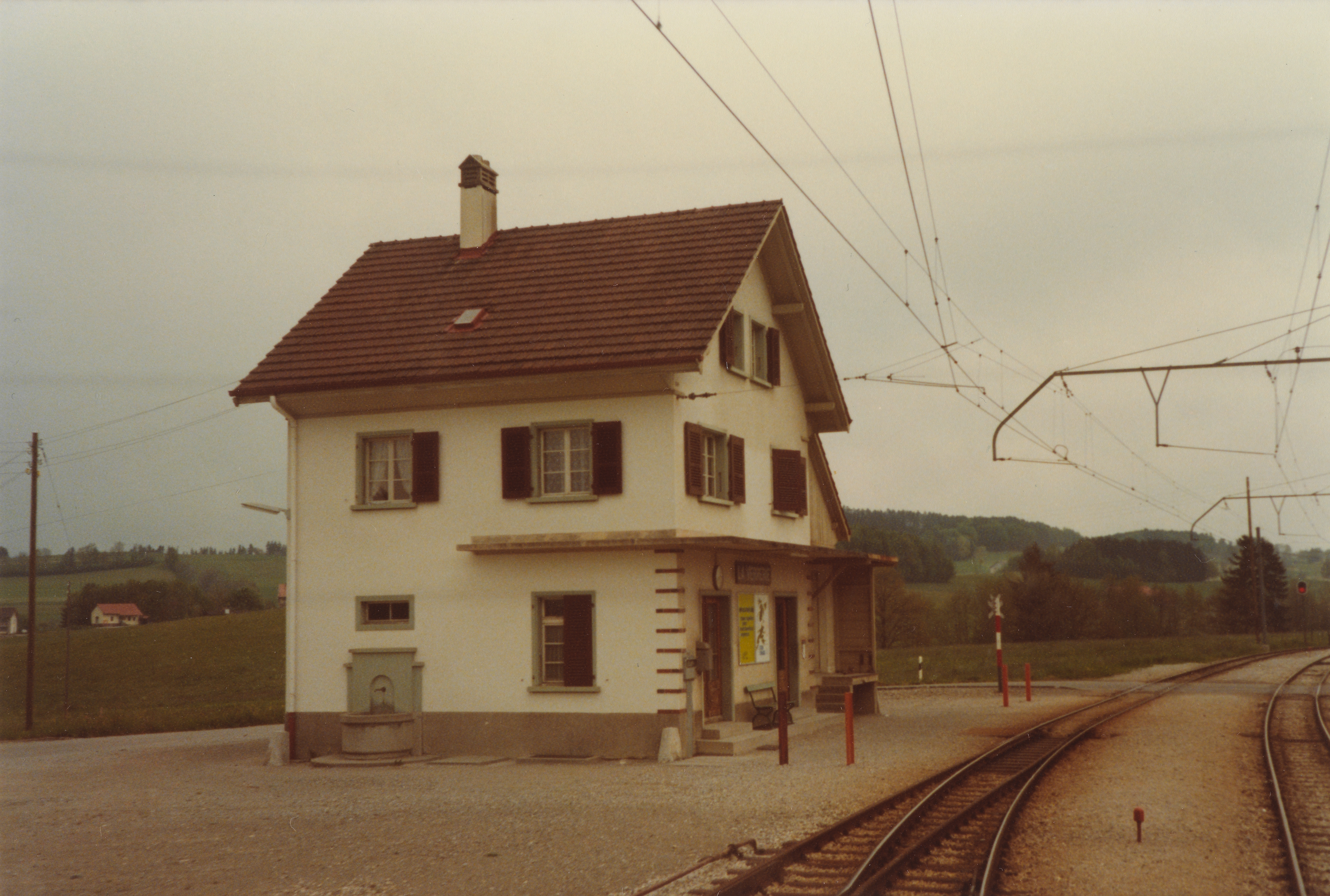
- The station in 2003

General information
- Location: Semsales, Fribourg; Switzerland
- Coordinates: 46°35′17″N 6°55′30″E
- Elevation: 836 m (2,743 ft)
- Owner: Transports publics Fribourgeois
- Line: Palézieux–Bulle–Montbovon line
- Distance: 7.8 km (4.8 mi) from Châtel-St-Denis
- Platforms: 2 (1 island platform)
- Tracks: 2
- Train operators: Transports publics Fribourgeois
- Connections: Transports publics Fribourgeois buses

Construction
- Parking: Yes (4 spaces)
- Accessible: No

Other information
- Station code: 8504064 (VERI)
- Fare zone: 41 (frimobil)

History
- Opened: 23 July 1903

Services
Preceding station	RER Fribourg	Following station
Semsales towards Palézieux	S50	Vaulruz-Sud towards Montbovon
Semsales towards Palézieux	S51	Vaulruz-Sud towards Gruyères
Location

La Verrerie railway station (French: Gare de La Verrerie), is a railway station in the municipality of Semsales, in the Swiss canton of Fribourg. It is an intermediate stop on the 1,000 mm (3 ft 3 3/8 in) metre gauge Palézieux–Bulle–Montbovon railway line of Transports publics Fribourgeois.

== Services ==
As of the December 2024 timetable change, the following services stop at La Verrerie:

- RER Fribourg S50 / S51: half-hourly service on weekdays and hourly service on weekends between Palézieux and Gruyères and hourly service from Gruyères to Montbovon.

== Bibliography ==
- Wägli, Hans G.; Jacobi, Sébastien (2010). Schienennetz Schweiz - Bahnprofil Schweiz CH+ [Swiss rail network] (in German) (3rd ed.). Zürich: AS Verlag. ISBN 978-3-909111-74-9.
