= La Tour-de-Trême Ronclina railway station =

Railway station in Bulle, Switzerland

La Tour-de-Trême Ronclina

General information
- Location: Bulle, Fribourg; Switzerland
- Coordinates: 46°36′22″N 7°03′40″E
- Elevation: 750 m (2,460 ft)
- Owner: Transports publics Fribourgeois
- Line: Palézieux–Bulle–Montbovon line
- Distance: 21.0 km (13.0 mi) from Châtel-St-Denis
- Platforms: 1 (1 side platform)
- Tracks: 1
- Train operators: Transports publics Fribourgeois
- Connections: TPF buses

Construction
- Accessible: Yes

Other information
- Station code: 8504079 (TDT)
- Fare zone: 30 (frimobil)

History
- Opened: 14 July 1904

Services
Preceding station	RER Fribourg	Following station
Bulle towards Palézieux	S50	Le Pâquier-Montbarry towards Montbovon
Bulle towards Palézieux	S51	Le Pâquier-Montbarry towards Gruyères
Location

La Tour-de-Trême Ronclina railway station (French: Gare de La Tour-de-Trême Ronclina), is a railway station in the municipality of Bulle, in the Swiss canton of Fribourg. It is an intermediate stop on the 1,000 mm (3 ft 3 3/8 in) metre gauge Palézieux–Bulle–Montbovon railway line of Transports publics Fribourgeois.

== Services ==
As of the December 2024 timetable change, the following services stop at La Tour-de-Trême Ronclina:

- RER Fribourg S50 / S51: half-hourly service on weekdays and hourly service on weekends between Palézieux and Gruyères and hourly service from Gruyères to Montbovon.

== Bibliography ==
- Wägli, Hans G.; Jacobi, Sébastien (2010). Schienennetz Schweiz - Bahnprofil Schweiz CH+ [Swiss rail network] (in German) (3rd ed.). Zürich: AS Verlag. ISBN 978-3-909111-74-9.
