= Le Pâquier-Montbarry railway station =

Railway station in Le Pâquier, Switzerland

Le Pâquier-Montbarry
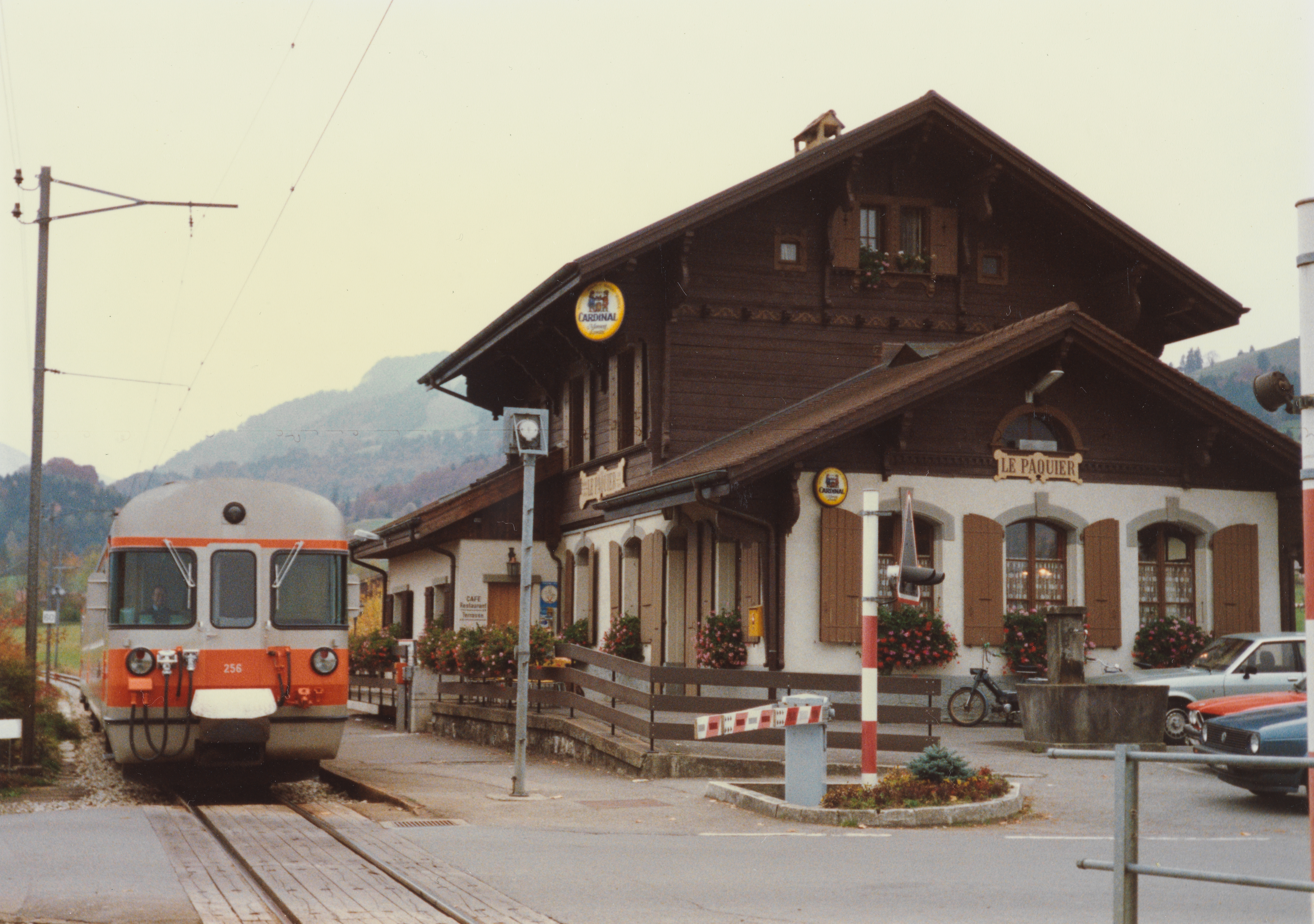
- The station in 1980

General information
- Location: Le Pâquier, Fribourg; Switzerland
- Coordinates: 46°35′42″N 7°03′36″E
- Elevation: 731 m (2,398 ft)
- Owner: Transports publics Fribourgeois
- Line: Palézieux–Bulle–Montbovon line
- Distance: 22.2 km (13.8 mi) from Châtel-St-Denis
- Platforms: 1 (1 side platform)
- Tracks: 1
- Train operators: Transports publics Fribourgeois
- Connections: TPF buses

Construction
- Accessible: No

Other information
- Station code: 8504078 (PAQ)
- Fare zone: 30 (frimobil)

History
- Opened: 23 July 1903

Services
| Preceding station | RER Fribourg | Following station |
|---|---|---|
| La Tour-de-Trême Ronclina towards Palézieux | S50 | Gruyères towards Montbovon |
| La Tour-de-Trême Ronclina towards Palézieux | S51 | Gruyères Terminus |
Location

Le Pâquier-Montbarry railway station (French: Gare de Le Pâquier-Montbarry), is a railway station in the municipality of Le Pâquier, in the Swiss canton of Fribourg. It is an intermediate stop on the 1,000 mm (3 ft 3 3/8 in) metre gauge Palézieux–Bulle–Montbovon railway line of Transports publics Fribourgeois.

== Services ==
As of the December 2024 timetable change, the following services stop at Le Pâquier-Montbarry:

- RER Fribourg S50 / S51: half-hourly service on weekdays and hourly service on weekends between Palézieux and Gruyères and hourly service from Gruyères to Montbovon.

== Bibliography ==
- Wägli, Hans G.; Jacobi, Sébastien (2010). Schienennetz Schweiz - Bahnprofil Schweiz CH+ [Swiss rail network] (in German) (3rd ed.). Zürich: AS Verlag. ISBN 978-3-909111-74-9.
