= Enney railway station =

Railway station in Bas-Intyamon, Switzerland

Enney
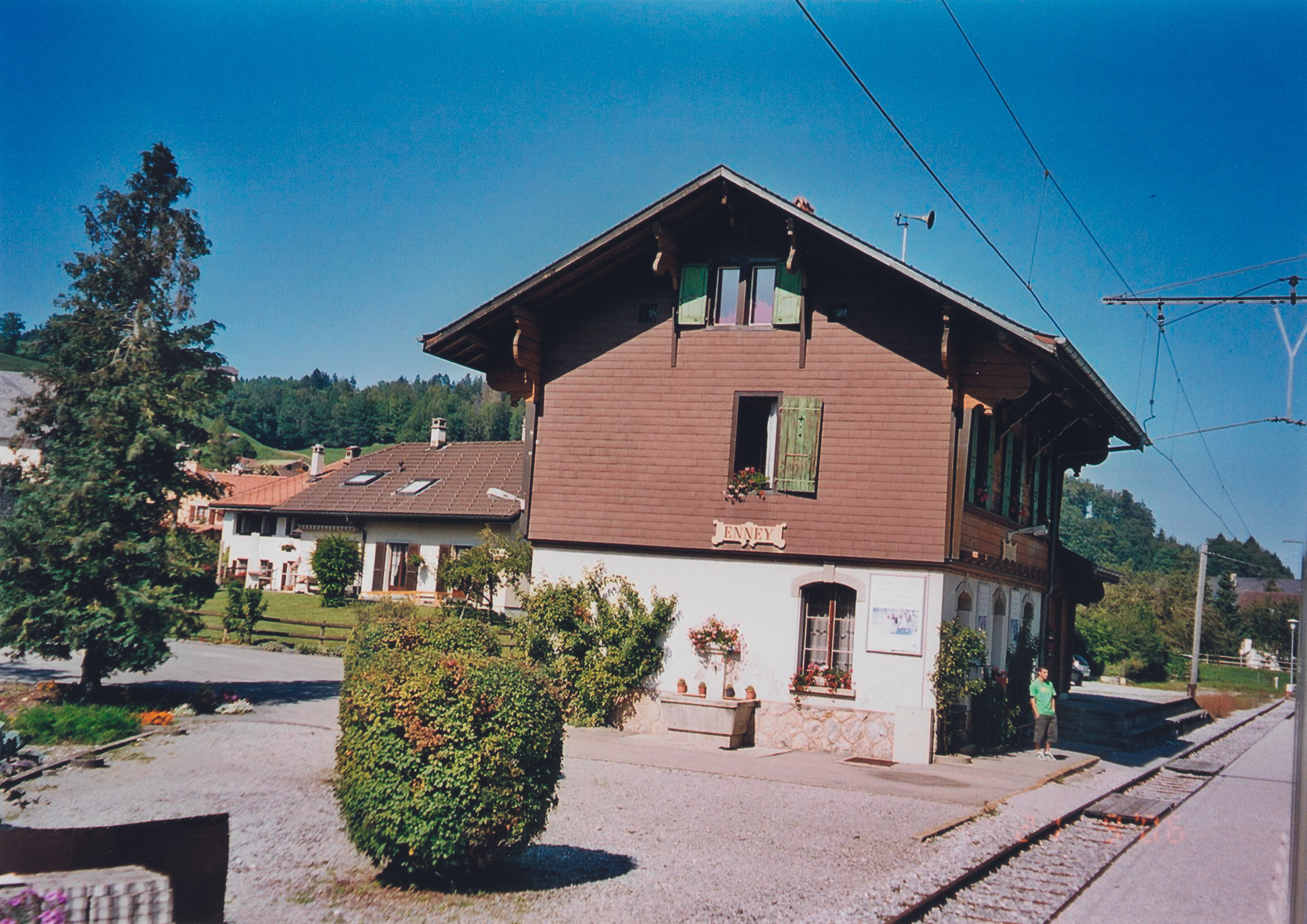
- The Enney station building in 2006

General information
- Location: Bas-Intyamon, Fribourg; Switzerland
- Coordinates: 46°33′54″N 7°05′06″E
- Elevation: 712 m (2,336 ft)
- Owner: Transports publics Fribourgeois
- Line: Palézieux–Bulle–Montbovon line
- Distance: 26.7 km (16.6 mi) from Châtel-St-Denis
- Platforms: 1 (1 side platform)
- Tracks: 1
- Train operators: Transports publics Fribourgeois

Construction
- Parking: 6
- Accessible: Yes

Other information
- Station code: 8504075 (ENN)
- Fare zone: 21 (frimobil)

History
- Opened: 23 July 1903

Services
Preceding station	RER Fribourg	Following station
Gruyères towards Palézieux	S50	Villars-sous-Mont towards Montbovon
Location

Enney railway station (French: Gare d'Enney) is located in the municipality of Bas-Intyamon, within the Swiss canton of Fribourg. This station serves as an intermediate stop on the Palézieux–Bulle–Montbovon railway line operated by Transports publics Fribourgeois.

The station is situated along a single-line track and features one side platform, accommodating passenger boarding. Located 26.7 kilometers from Châtel-St-Denis, Enney station is within zone 21 of the frimobil fare network. The station offers parking with six available spaces and is accessible for individuals with disabilities.

Opened on 23 July 1903, Enney continues to serve the S50 line of the RER Fribourg network, with neighboring stops at Gruyères to the west and Villars-sous-Mont to the east.

== Services ==
As of the December 2023 timetable change, the following service stops at Enney:

- RER Fribourg S50: hourly service between Palézieux and Montbovon.

== Bibliography ==
- Wägli, Hans G.; Jacobi, Sébastien (2010). Schienennetz Schweiz - Bahnprofil Schweiz CH+ [Swiss rail network] (in German) (3rd ed.). Zürich: AS Verlag. ISBN 978-3-909111-74-9.
