= Albeuve railway station =

Railway station in Haut-Intyamon, Switzerland

Albeuve
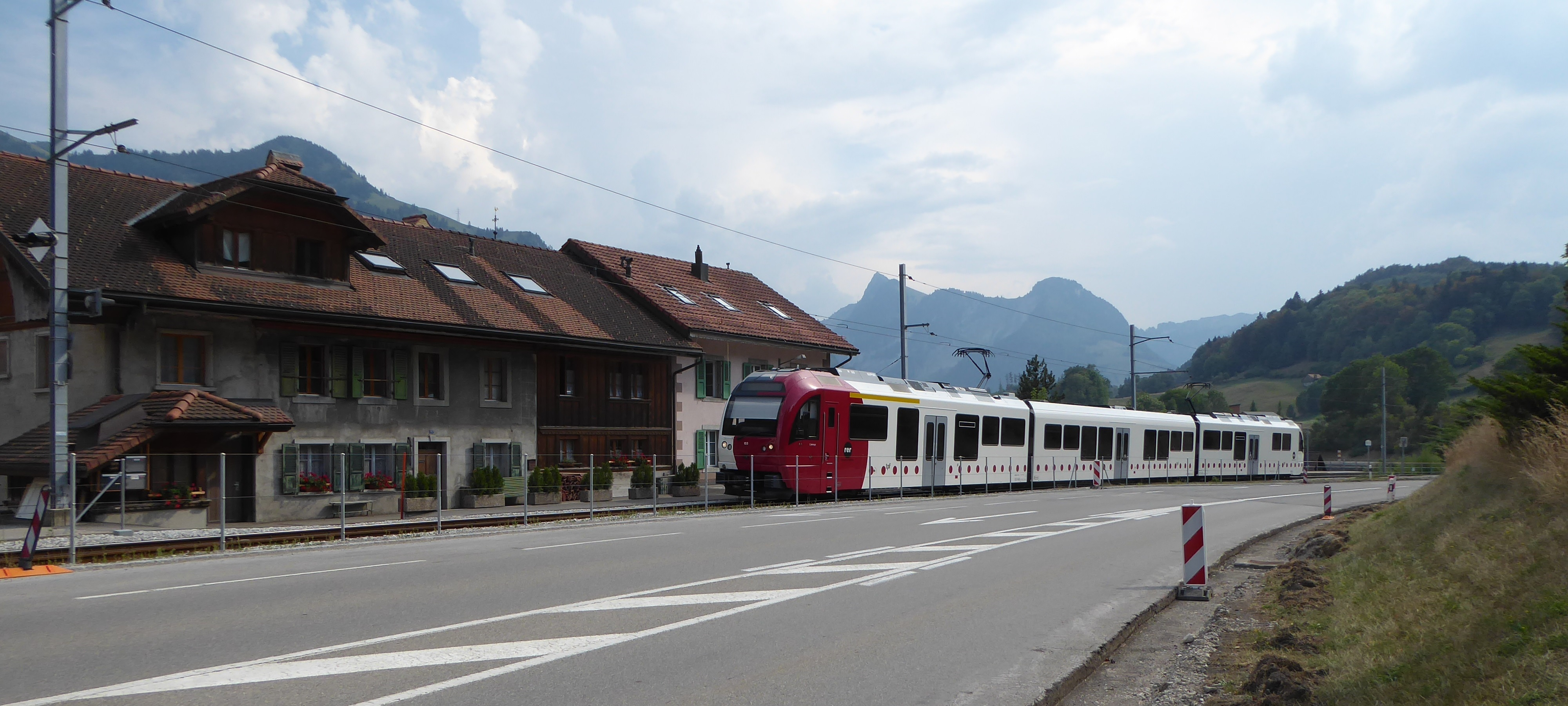
- A train at the station in 2018

General information
- Location: Haut-Intyamon, Fribourg; Switzerland
- Coordinates: 46°31′05″N 7°03′18″E
- Elevation: 767 m (2,516 ft)
- Owner: Transports publics Fribourgeois
- Line: Palézieux–Bulle–Montbovon line
- Distance: 32.6 km (20.3 mi) from Châtel-St-Denis
- Platforms: 1 (1 side platform)
- Tracks: 1
- Train operators: Transports publics Fribourgeois

Construction
- Accessible: No

Other information
- Station code: 8504072 (ALBE)
- Fare zone: 22 (frimobil)

History
- Opened: 23 July 1903

Services
Preceding station	RER Fribourg	Following station
Neirivue towards Palézieux	S50	Lessoc towards Montbovon
Location

Albeuve railway station (French: Gare de Albeuve), is a railway station in the municipality of Haut-Intyamon, in the Swiss canton of Fribourg. It is an intermediate stop on the 1,000 mm (3 ft 3 3/8 in) metre gauge Palézieux–Bulle–Montbovon railway line of Transports publics Fribourgeois.

== Services ==
As of the December 2023 timetable change, the following services stop at Albeuve:

- RER Fribourg S50: hourly service between Palézieux and Montbovon.

== Bibliography ==
- Wägli, Hans G.; Jacobi, Sébastien (2010). Schienennetz Schweiz - Bahnprofil Schweiz CH+ [Swiss rail network] (in German) (3rd ed.). Zürich: AS Verlag. ISBN 978-3-909111-74-9.
