= Villars-sous-Mont railway station =

Railway station in Bas-Intyamon, Switzerland

Villars-sous-Mont
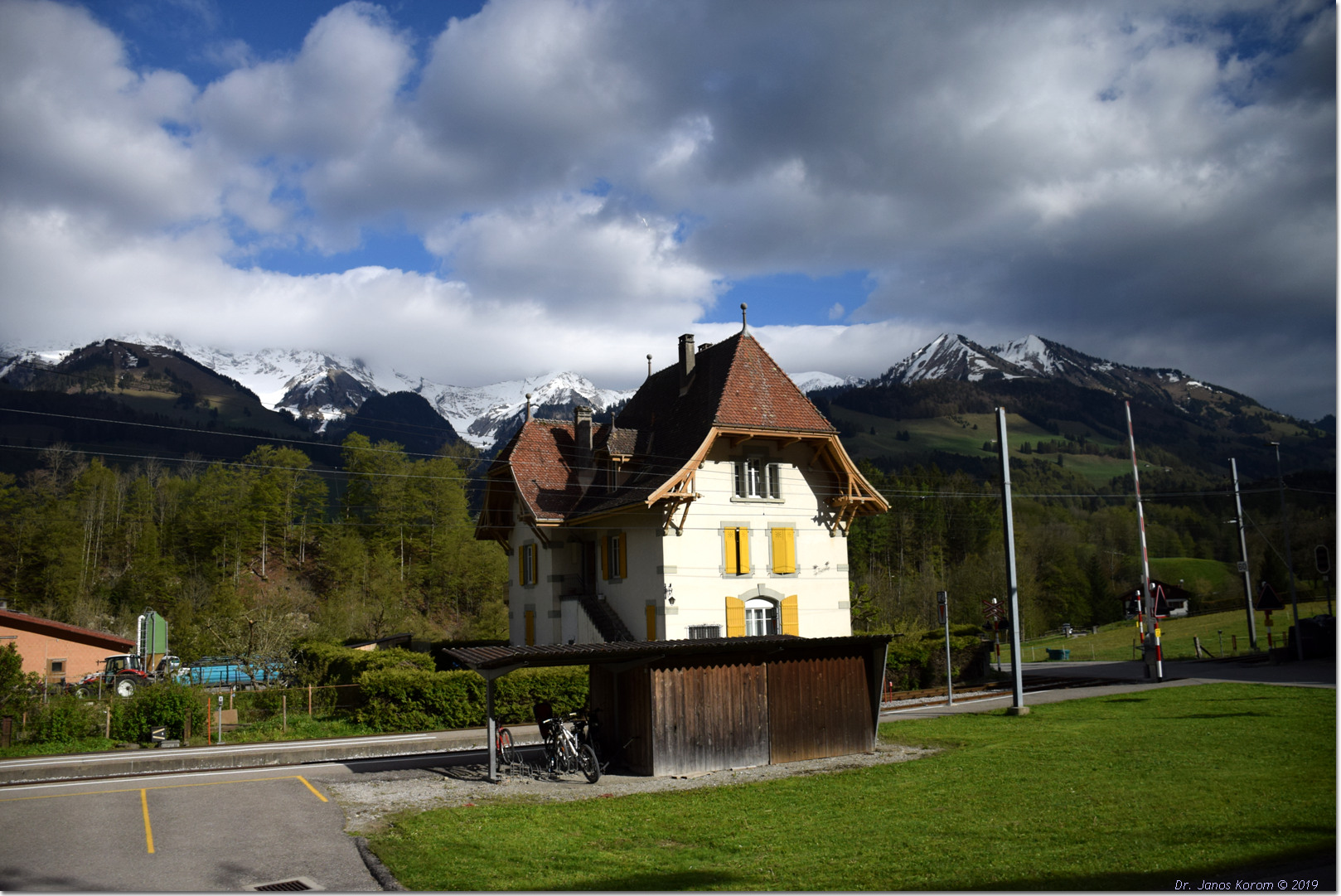
- The station in 2019

General information
- Location: Bas-Intyamon, Fribourg; Switzerland
- Coordinates: 46°32′38″N 7°04′23″E
- Elevation: 739 m (2,425 ft)
- Owner: Transports publics Fribourgeois
- Line: Palézieux–Bulle–Montbovon line
- Distance: 29.4 km (18.3 mi) from Châtel-St-Denis
- Platforms: 1 (1 side platform)
- Tracks: 3
- Train operators: Transports publics Fribourgeois

Construction
- Parking: 11
- Accessible: No

Other information
- Station code: 8504074 (GRVI)
- Fare zone: 21 (frimobil)

History
- Opened: 23 July 1903
- Former names: Grandvillard (until 2018)

Services
| Preceding station | RER Fribourg | Following station |
|---|---|---|
| Enney towards Palézieux | S50 | Neirivue towards Montbovon |
Location

Villars-sous-Mont railway station (French: Gare de Villars-sous-Mont), is a railway station in the municipality of Bas-Intyamon, in the Swiss canton of Fribourg. It is an intermediate stop on the 1,000 mm (3 ft 3 3/8 in) metre gauge Palézieux–Bulle–Montbovon railway line of Transports publics Fribourgeois.

== Services ==
As of the December 2023 timetable change, the following services stop at Villars-sous-Mont:

- RER Fribourg S50: hourly service between Palézieux and Montbovon.

== Bibliography ==
- Wägli, Hans G.; Jacobi, Sébastien (2010). Schienennetz Schweiz - Bahnprofil Schweiz CH+ [Swiss rail network] (in German) (3rd ed.). Zürich: AS Verlag. ISBN 978-3-909111-74-9.
