= Semsales railway station =

Railway station in Semsales, Switzerland

Semsales
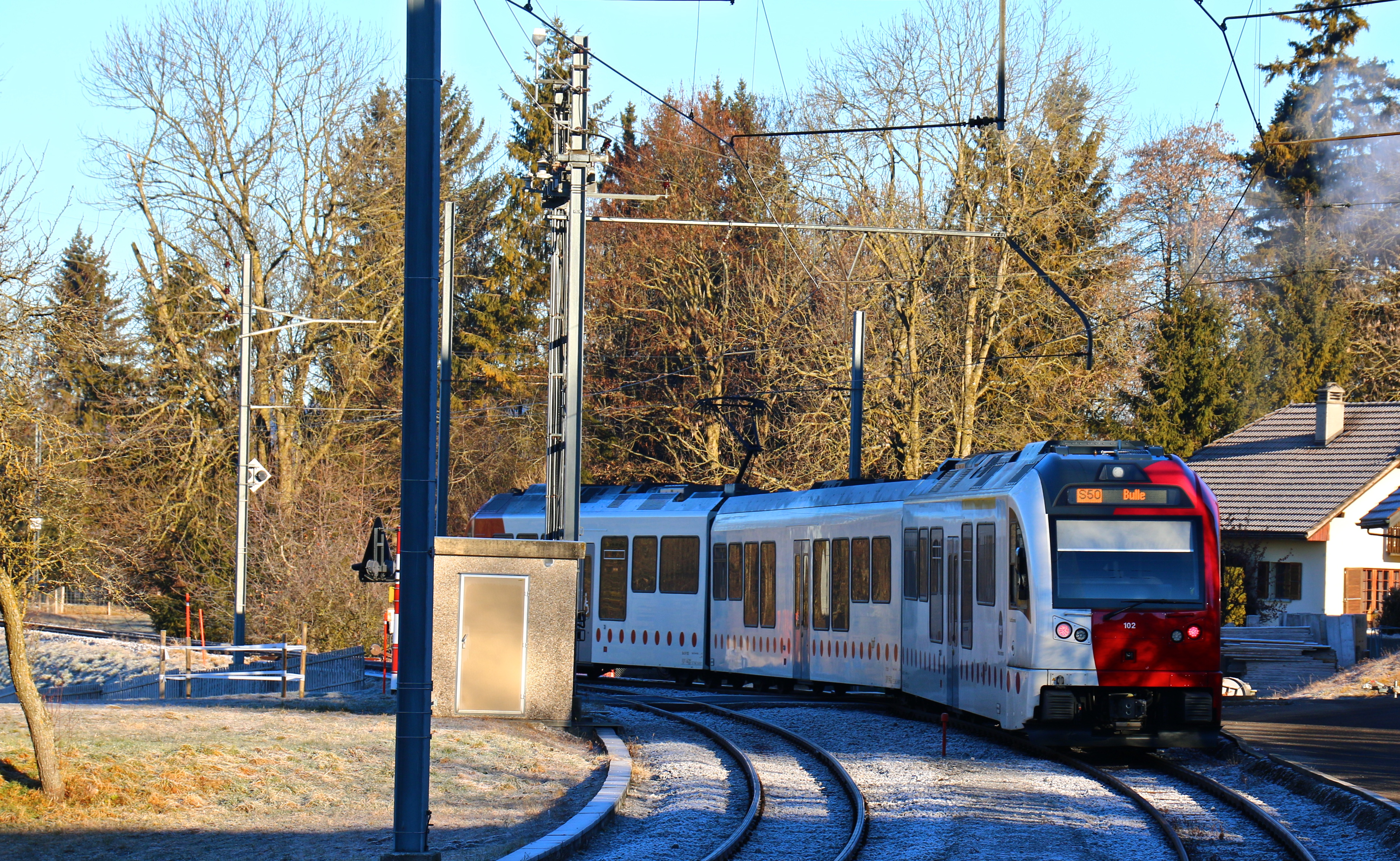
- A train at the station in 2016

General information
- Location: Semsales, Fribourg; Switzerland
- Coordinates: 46°34′23″N 6°55′37″E
- Elevation: 858 m (2,815 ft)
- Owner: Transports publics Fribourgeois
- Line: Palézieux–Bulle–Montbovon line
- Distance: 6.2 km (3.9 mi) from Châtel-St-Denis
- Platforms: 1 (1 side platform)
- Tracks: 1
- Train operators: Transports publics Fribourgeois
- Connections: Transports publics Fribourgeois night bus line

Construction
- Accessible: No

Other information
- Station code: 8504063 (SEMS)
- Fare zone: 41 (frimobil)

History
- Opened: 23 July 1903

Services
| Preceding station | RER Fribourg | Following station |
|---|---|---|
| Châtel-St-Denis towards Palézieux | S50 | La Verrerie towards Montbovon |
| Châtel-St-Denis towards Palézieux | S51 | La Verrerie towards Gruyères |
Location

Semsales railway station (French: Gare de Semsales), is a railway station in the municipality of Semsales, in the Swiss canton of Fribourg. It is an intermediate stop on the 1,000 mm (3 ft 3 3/8 in) metre gauge Palézieux–Bulle–Montbovon railway line of Transports publics Fribourgeois.

== Services ==
As of the December 2024 timetable change, the following services stop at Semsales:

- RER Fribourg S50 / S51: half-hourly service on weekdays and hourly service on weekends between Palézieux and Gruyères and hourly service from Gruyères to Montbovon.

== Bibliography ==
- Wägli, Hans G.; Jacobi, Sébastien (2010). Schienennetz Schweiz - Bahnprofil Schweiz CH+ [Swiss rail network] (in German) (3rd ed.). Zürich: AS Verlag. ISBN 978-3-909111-74-9.
