= Remaufens railway station =

Railway station in Remaufens, Switzerland

Remaufens

General information
- Location: Remaufens, Fribourg; Switzerland
- Coordinates: 46°31′26″N 6°52′34″E
- Elevation: 757 m (2,484 ft)
- Owner: Transports publics Fribourgeois
- Line: Palézieux–Bulle–Montbovon line
- Distance: 4.9 km (3.0 mi) from Palézieux
- Platforms: 1 (1 side platform)
- Tracks: 1
- Train operators: Transports publics Fribourgeois
- Connections: TPF bus line

Construction
- Accessible: Yes

Other information
- Station code: 8504061 (REMA)
- Fare zone: 160 (mobilis); 40 (frimobil)

History
- Opened: 29 April 1901

Services
Preceding station	RER Fribourg	Following station
Bossonnens towards Palézieux	S50	Châtel-St-Denis towards Montbovon
Bossonnens towards Palézieux	S51	Châtel-St-Denis towards Gruyères
Location

Remaufens railway station (French: Gare de Remaufens), is a railway station in the municipality of Remaufens, in the Swiss canton of Fribourg. It is an intermediate stop on the 1,000 mm (3 ft 3 3/8 in) metre gauge Palézieux–Bulle–Montbovon railway line of Transports publics Fribourgeois.

== Services ==
As of the December 2024 timetable change, the following services stop at Remaufens:

- RER Fribourg S50 / S51: half-hourly service on weekdays and hourly service on weekends between Palézieux and Gruyères and hourly service from Gruyères to Montbovon.

== Bibliography ==
- Wägli, Hans G.; Jacobi, Sébastien (2010). Schienennetz Schweiz - Bahnprofil Schweiz CH+ [Swiss rail network] (in German) (3rd ed.). Zürich: AS Verlag. ISBN 978-3-909111-74-9.
