= Bossonnens railway station =

Railway station in Bossonnens, Switzerland

Bossonnens
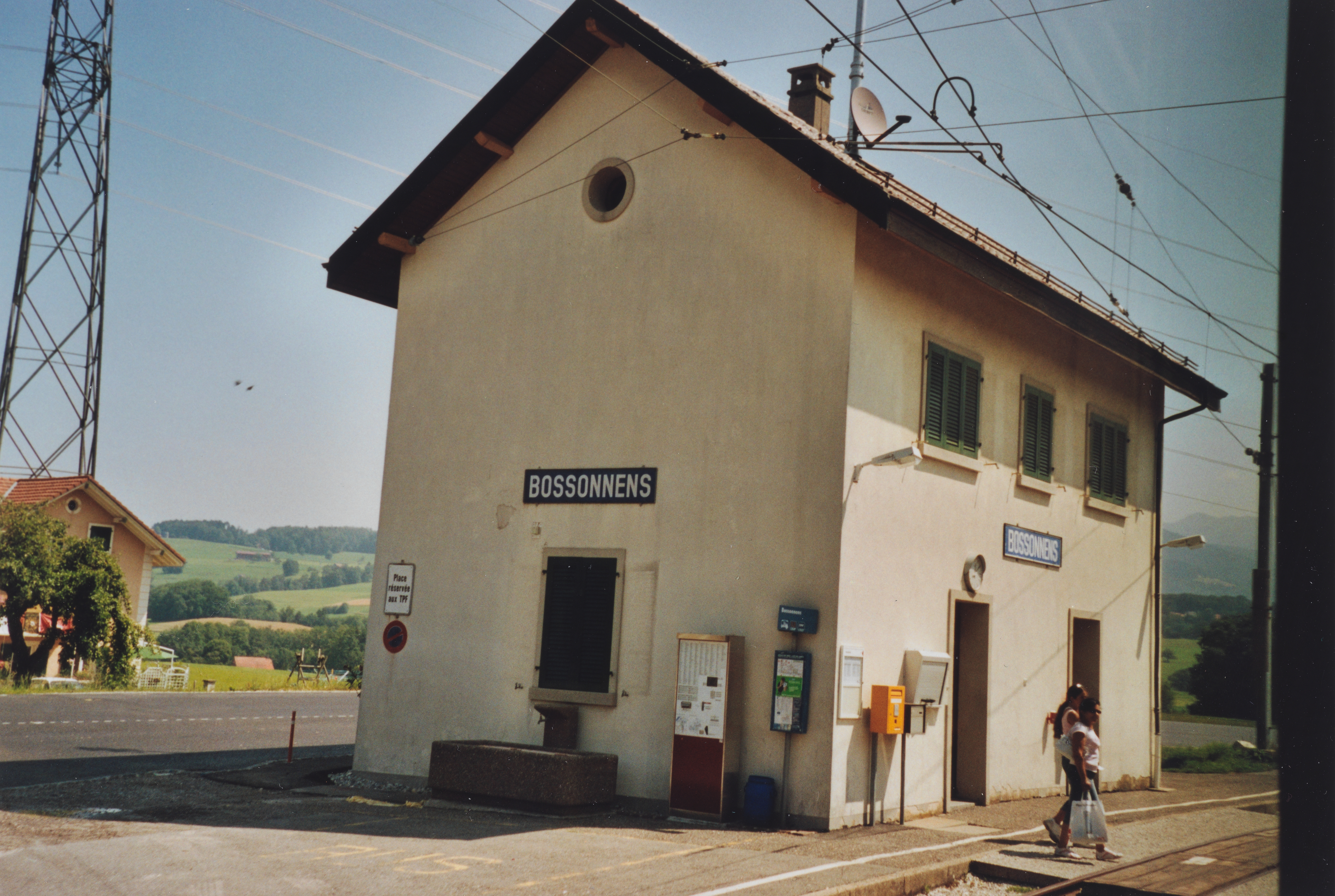
- The station building in 2006

General information
- Location: Bossonnens, Fribourg; Switzerland
- Coordinates: 46°31′34″N 6°51′11″E
- Elevation: 730 m (2,400 ft)
- Owner: Transports publics Fribourgeois
- Line: Palézieux–Bulle–Montbovon line
- Distance: 2.9 km (1.8 mi) from Palézieux
- Platforms: 1 (1 side platform)
- Tracks: 1
- Train operators: Transports publics Fribourgeois
- Connections: Transports publics Fribourgeois buses; VMCA bus line

Construction
- Parking: None
- Accessible: Yes

Other information
- Station code: 8504060 (BENS)
- Fare zone: 63 and 79 (mobilis); 93 and 95 (frimobil)

History
- Opened: 29 April 1901

Services
Preceding station	RER Fribourg	Following station
Palézieux Terminus	S50	Remaufens towards Montbovon
Palézieux Terminus	S51	Remaufens towards Gruyères
Location

Bossonnens railway station (French: Gare de Bossonnens), is a railway station in the municipality of Bossonnens, in the Swiss canton of Fribourg. It is an intermediate stop on the 1,000 mm (3 ft 3 3/8 in) metre gauge Palézieux–Bulle–Montbovon railway line of Transports publics Fribourgeois.

== Services ==
As of the December 2024 timetable change, the following services stop at Bossonnens:

- RER Fribourg S50 / S51: half-hourly service on weekdays and hourly service on weekends between Palézieux and Gruyères and hourly service from Gruyères to Montbovon.

== Bibliography ==
- Wägli, Hans G.; Jacobi, Sébastien (2010). Schienennetz Schweiz - Bahnprofil Schweiz CH+ [Swiss rail network] (in German) (3rd ed.). Zürich: AS Verlag. ISBN 978-3-909111-74-9.
