= Lessoc railway station =

Railway station in Haut-Intyamon, Switzerland

Lessoc
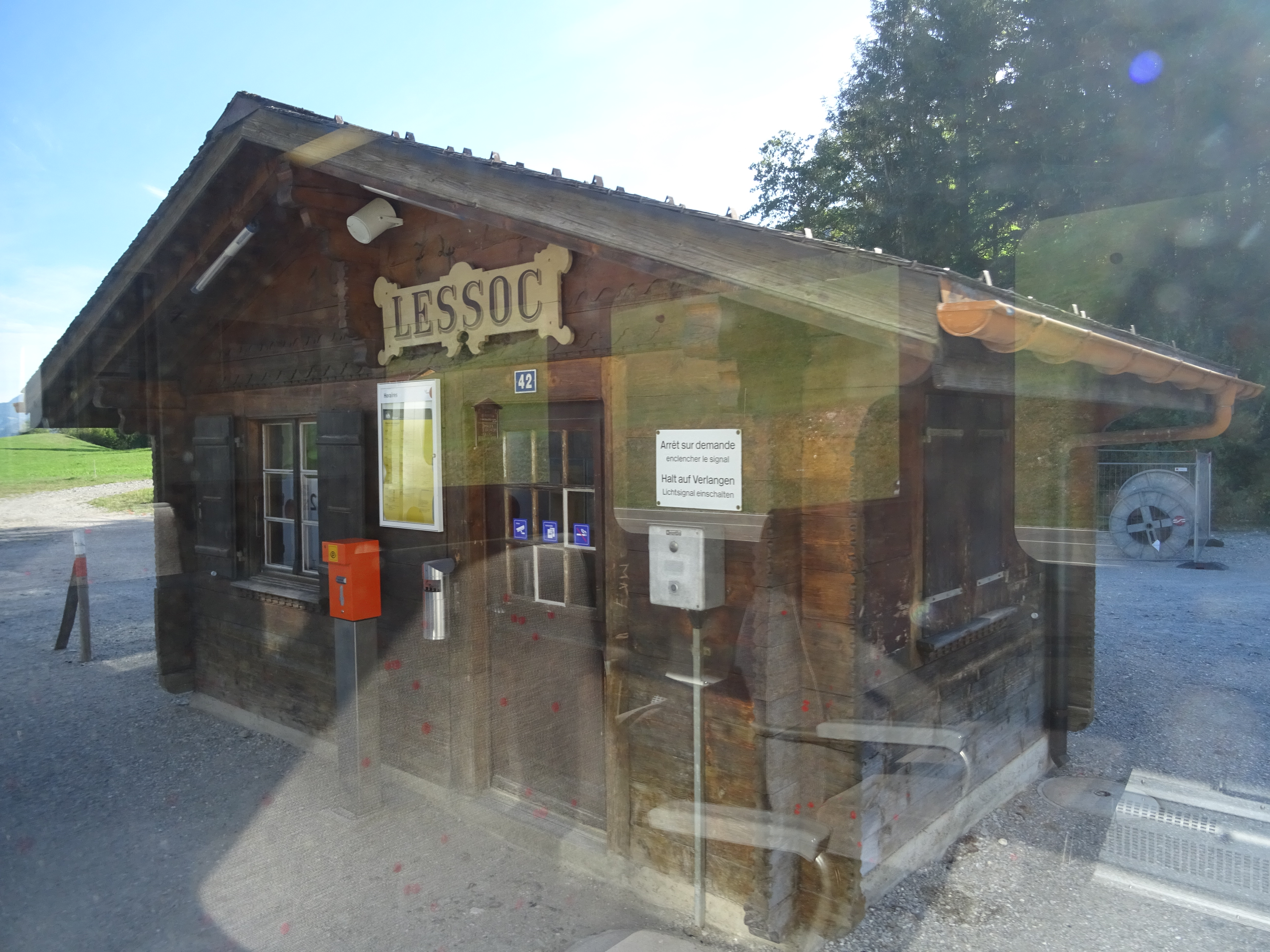
- The station in 2020

General information
- Location: Haut-Intyamon, Fribourg; Switzerland
- Coordinates: 46°30′25″N 7°03′11″E
- Elevation: 778 m (2,552 ft)
- Owner: Transports publics Fribourgeois
- Line: Palézieux–Bulle–Montbovon line
- Distance: 33.9 km (21.1 mi) from Châtel-St-Denis
- Platforms: 1 (1 side platform)
- Tracks: 1
- Train operators: Transports publics Fribourgeois

Construction
- Parking: 6
- Accessible: No

Other information
- Station code: 8504071 (LES)
- Fare zone: 22 (frimobil)

History
- Opened: 23 July 1903

Services
Preceding station	RER Fribourg	Following station
Albeuve towards Palézieux	S50	Montbovon Terminus
Location

Lessoc railway station (French: Gare de Lessoc), is a railway station in the municipality of Haut-Intyamon, in the Swiss canton of Fribourg. It is an intermediate stop on the 1,000 mm (3 ft 3 3/8 in) metre gauge Palézieux–Bulle–Montbovon railway line of Transports publics Fribourgeois.

== Services ==
As of the December 2023 timetable change, the following services stop at Lessoc:

- RER Fribourg S50: hourly service between Palézieux and Montbovon.

== Bibliography ==
- Wägli, Hans G.; Jacobi, Sébastien (2010). Schienennetz Schweiz - Bahnprofil Schweiz CH+ [Swiss rail network] (in German) (3rd ed.). Zürich: AS Verlag. ISBN 978-3-909111-74-9.
