= Gruyères railway station =

Railway station in Gruyères, Switzerland

Gruyères
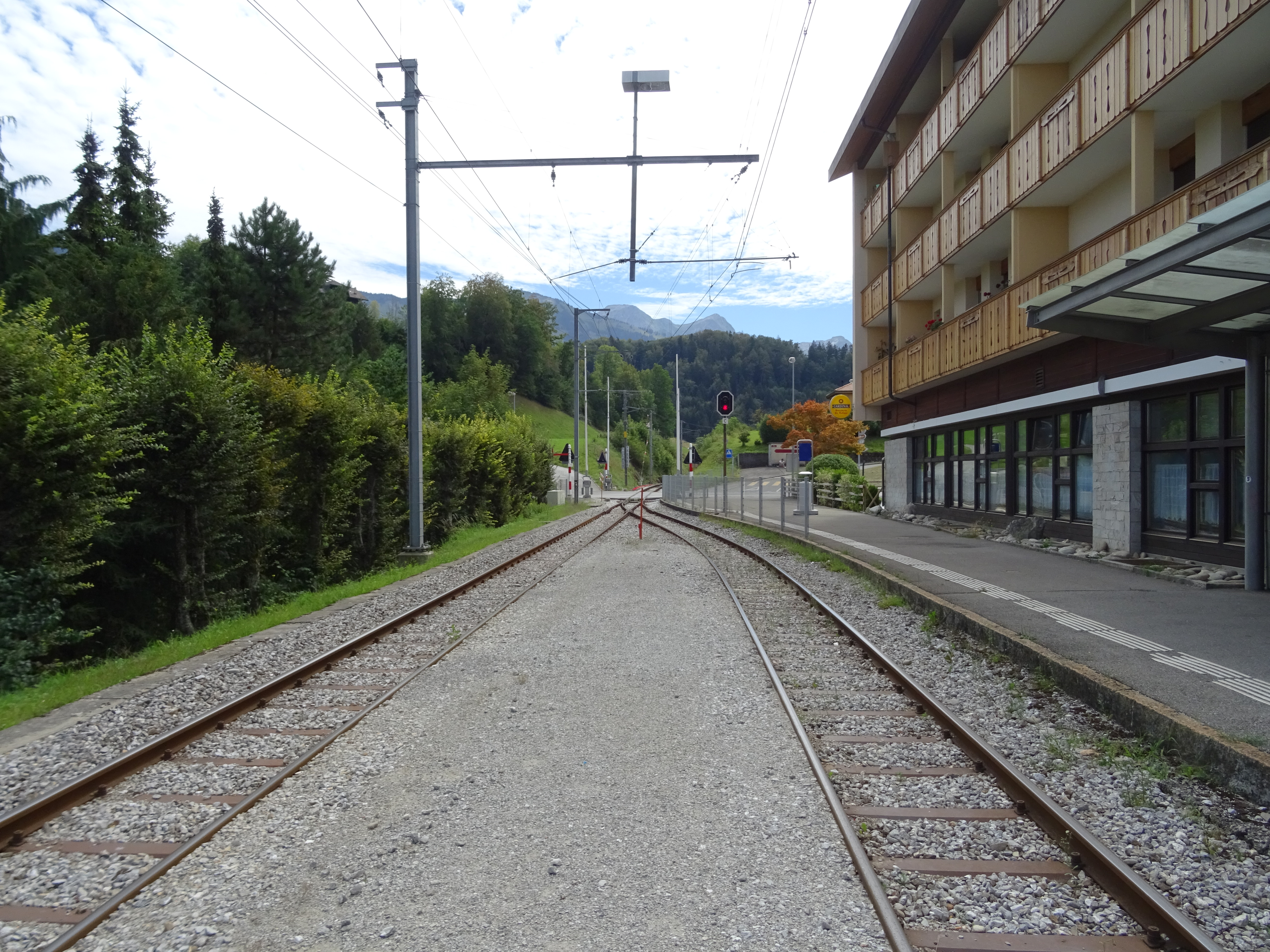
- The station in 2020 before the overhaul

General information
- Location: Gruyères, Fribourg; Switzerland
- Coordinates: 46°34′59″N 7°04′23″E
- Elevation: 746 m (2,448 ft)
- Owner: Transports publics Fribourgeois
- Line: Palézieux–Bulle–Montbovon line
- Distance: 24.0 km (14.9 mi) from Châtel-St-Denis
- Platforms: 2 (2 side platforms)
- Tracks: 2
- Train operators: Transports publics Fribourgeois
- Connections: TPF buses

Construction
- Parking: Yes (3 spaces)
- Accessible: Yes

Other information
- Station code: 8504077 (GRY)
- Fare zone: 31 (frimobil)

History
- Opened: 23 July 1903

Services
| Preceding station | RER Fribourg | Following station |
|---|---|---|
| Le Pâquier-Montbarry towards Palézieux | S50 | Enney towards Montbovon |
| Le Pâquier-Montbarry towards Palézieux | S51 | Terminus |
Location

Gruyères railway station (French: Gare de Gruyères), is a railway station in the municipality of Gruyères, in the Swiss canton of Fribourg. It is an intermediate stop on the 1,000 mm (3 ft 3 3/8 in) metre gauge Palézieux–Bulle–Montbovon railway line of Transports publics Fribourgeois.

== Services ==
As of the December 2024 timetable change, the following services stop at Gruyères:

- RER Fribourg S50 / S51: half-hourly service on weekdays and hourly service on weekends to Palézieux and hourly service to Montbovon.

== Bibliography ==
- Wägli, Hans G.; Jacobi, Sébastien (2010). Schienennetz Schweiz - Bahnprofil Schweiz CH+ [Swiss rail network] (in German) (3rd ed.). Zürich: AS Verlag. ISBN 978-3-909111-74-9.
