= Châtel-St-Denis railway station =

Railway station in Châtel-Saint-Denis, Switzerland

Châtel-St-Denis
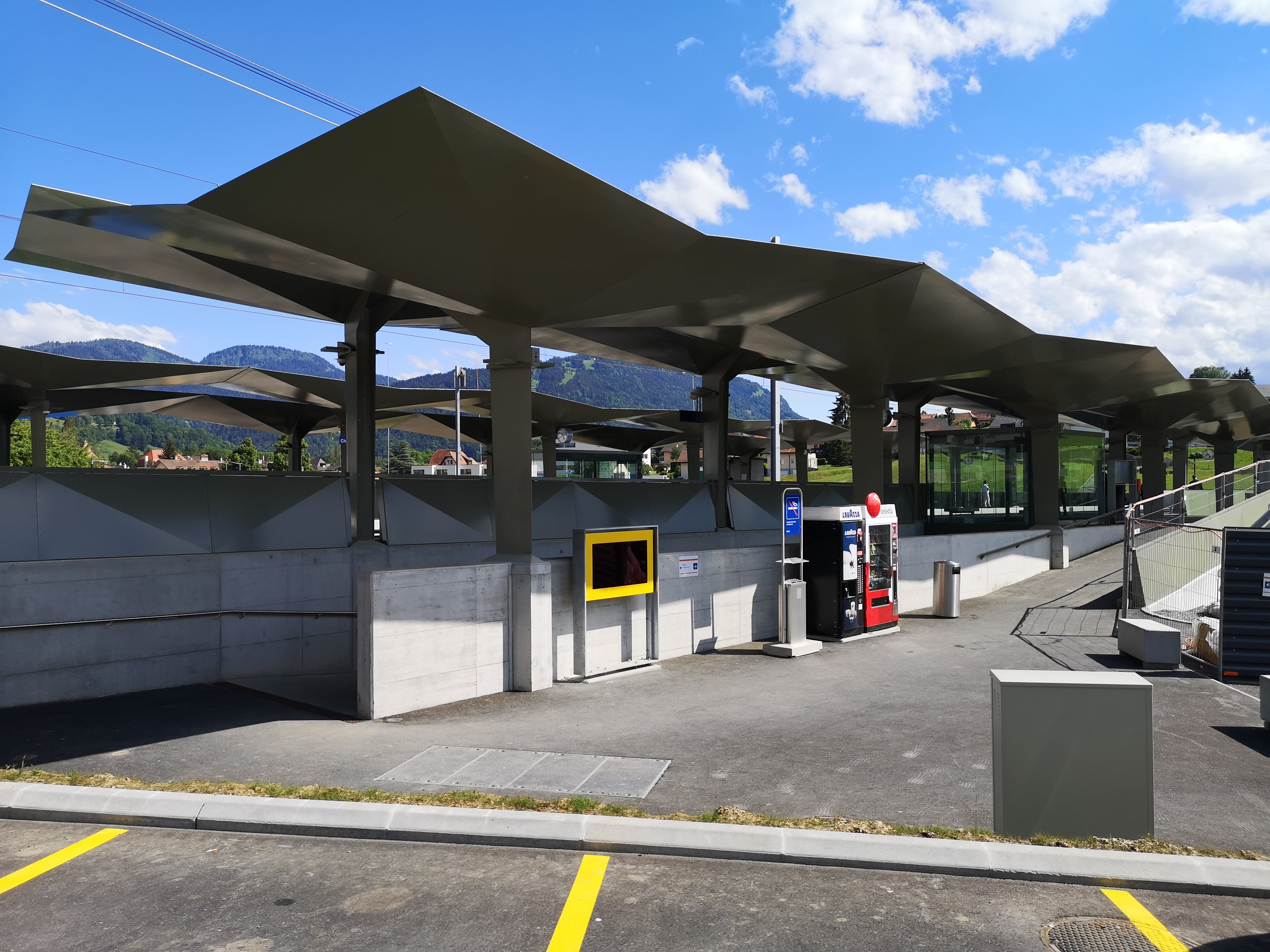
- The station in 2020

General information
- Location: Châtel-Saint-Denis, Fribourg; Switzerland
- Coordinates: 46°31′40″N 6°53′45″E
- Elevation: 807 m (2,648 ft)
- Owner: Transports publics Fribourgeois
- Lines: Palézieux–Bulle–Montbovon line; St-Légier–Châtel-St-Denis line (until 1969)
- Platforms: 2 (2 side platforms)
- Tracks: 1
- Train operators: Transports publics Fribourgeois
- Connections: Transports publics Fribourgeois buses; VMCA bus line

Construction
- Parking: None
- Accessible: Yes

Other information
- Station code: 8504062 (CHSD)
- Fare zone: 160 (mobilis); 40 (frimobil)

History
- Opened: 29 April 1901

Services
Preceding station	RER Fribourg	Following station
Remaufens towards Palézieux	S50	Semsales towards Montbovon
Remaufens towards Palézieux	S51	Semsales towards Gruyères
Location

Châtel-St-Denis railway station (French: Gare de Châtel-St-Denis), is a railway station in the municipality of Châtel-Saint-Denis, in the Swiss canton of Fribourg. It is an intermediate stop on the 1,000 mm (3 ft 3 3/8 in) metre gauge Palézieux–Bulle–Montbovon railway line of Transports publics Fribourgeois.

== History ==
Châtel-Saint-Denis railway station was opened on 29 April 1901 by the Châtel-Saint-Denis - Palézieux (CP). The Chemins de fer électriques de la Gruyère (CEG) opened the line from Châtel-Saint-Denis to Vuadens in 1903 and the Chemins de fer électriques veveysans opened the line from Châtel-Saint-Denis to Saint-Légier in 1904.

The old station

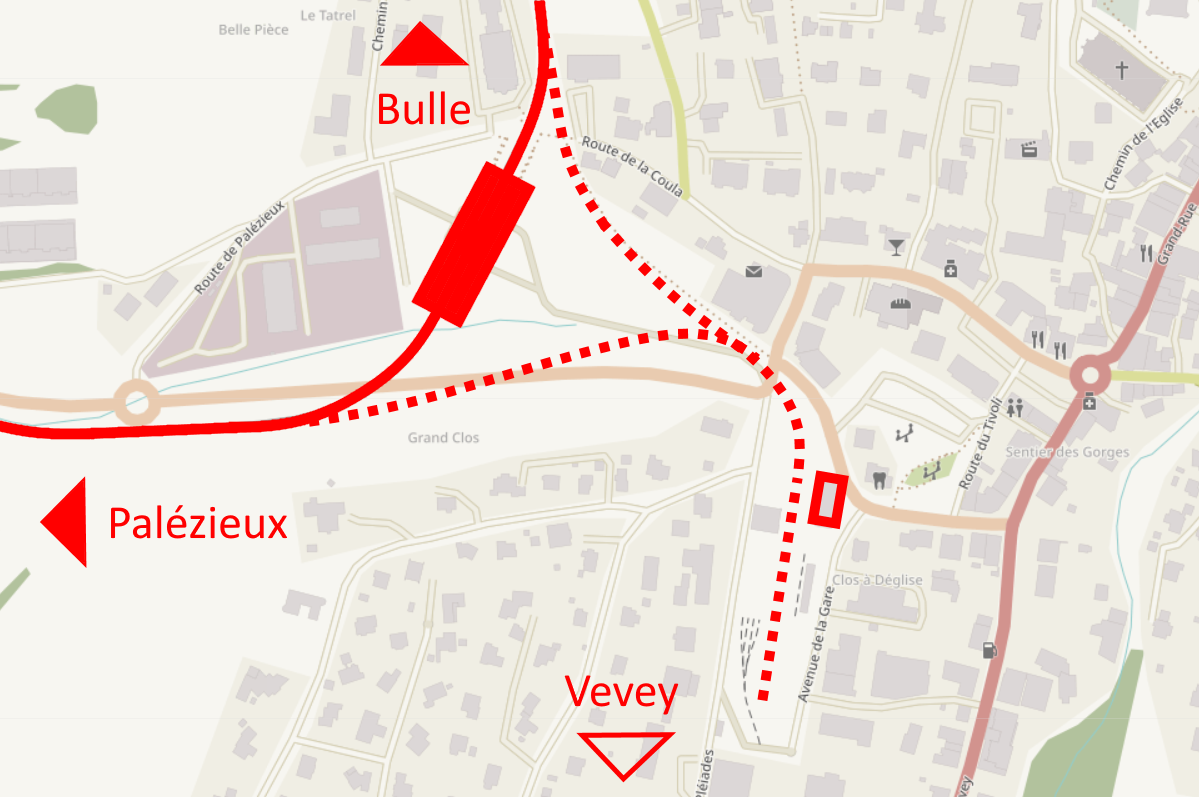
Map showing the current station opened in 2019 (full rectangle) and the old station (empty rectangle), with the current track in full line and the old tracks in dotted line.

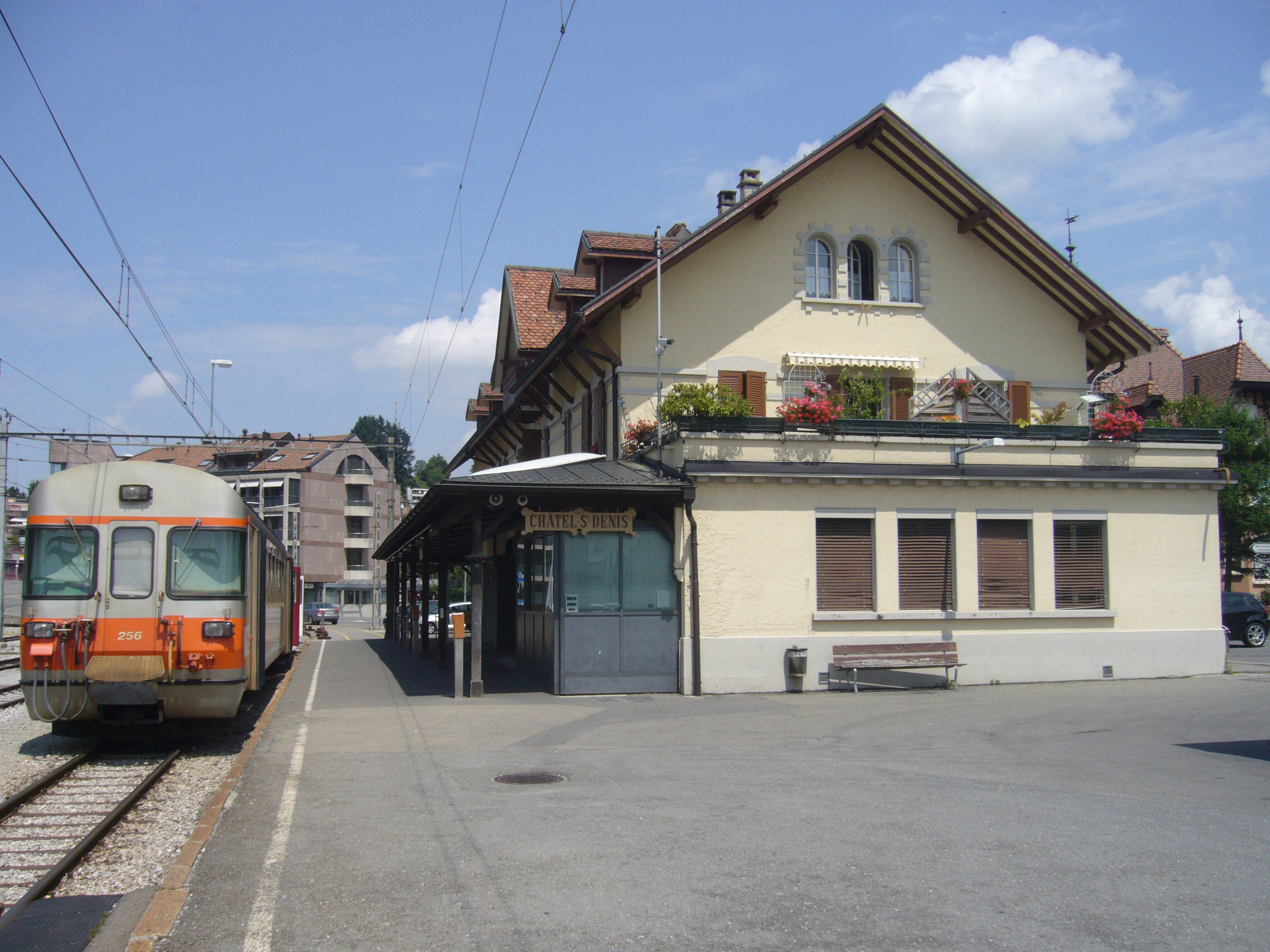
The old station in 2013.

The line to Saint-Légier was discontinued in 1969, leaving the station at a dead end. A new station was therefore opened in 2019, a few hundred metres from the old one, to reduce the distance between Palézieux and Bulle by eliminating the turning back at the station, thereby saving three minutes on this route. The project, which took three years to complete at a cost of CHF 60 million, also included the construction of a new cantonal road, the revitalisation of the Tatrel stream and the creation of a greenway.

== Services ==
As of the December 2024 timetable change, the following services stop at Châtel-St-Denis:

- RER Fribourg S50 / S51: half-hourly service on weekdays and hourly service on weekends between Palézieux and Gruyères and hourly service from Gruyères to Montbovon.

== Bibliography ==
- Wägli, Hans G.; Jacobi, Sébastien (2010). Schienennetz Schweiz - Bahnprofil Schweiz CH+ [Swiss rail network] (in German) (3rd ed.). Zürich: AS Verlag. ISBN 978-3-909111-74-9.
