= RER Fribourg =

Overview
- Locale: Canton of Fribourg
- Transit type: S-Bahn
- Number of lines: 7
- Website: www.tpf.ch/en/rer

Operation
- Began operation: 2011
- Operators: Swiss Federal Railways; Transports publics Fribourgeois

Technical
- Track gauge: 1,000 mm (3 ft 3 3/8 in) metre gauge; 1,435 mm (4 ft 8 1/2 in) standard gauge

RER Fribourg or RER Fribourg | Freiburg (French: Réseau express régional fribourgeois, German: S-Bahn Freiburg) is an S-Bahn network in the canton of Fribourg in Switzerland. The network has two hubs, Bulle and Fribourg, and began operating in 2011 (15 years ago).

== History ==
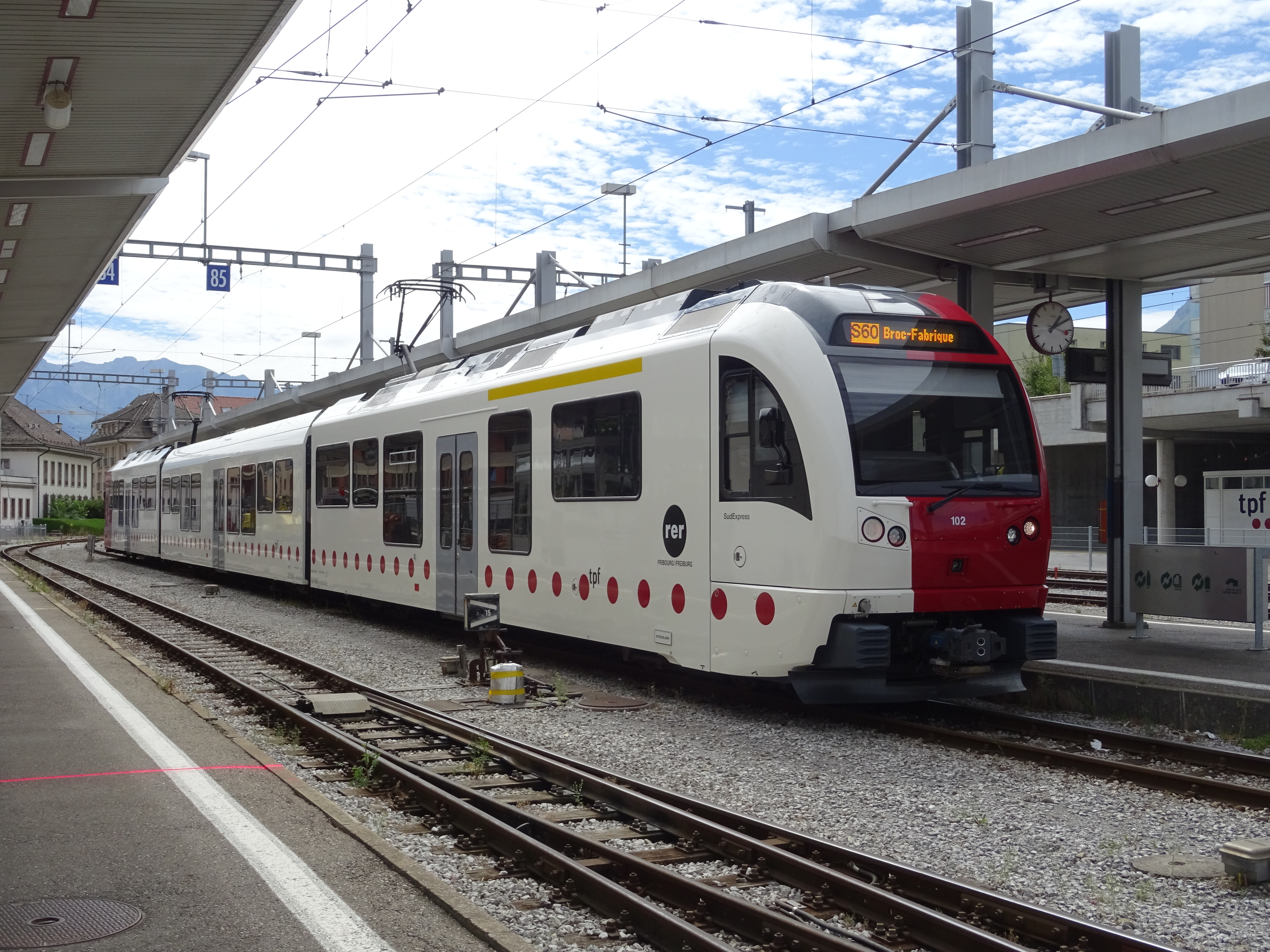
S60 service of RER Fribourg at former Bulle railway station

The RER Fribourg network began operation with the 11 December 2011 timetable change. At the outset, the network consisted of a half-hourly RegioExpress service between Bulle and Fribourg/Freiburg, with rush-hour service between Fribourg and Bern. On 9 December 2012, half-hourly operation was introduced between Palézieux and Châtel-St-Denis, on the Palézieux–Bulle–Montbovon railway line. As part of the new service, eight stations on the line closed. Also introduced was hourly service on the Bulle–Broc railway line, with through operation to and from Montbovon. These improvements were known collectively as "RER Sud" (south). In addition, the frequency of the RegioExpress service between Fribourg and Bern became hourly.

With the December 2014 timetable change, S-Bahn-style "S" designations were applied for the first time:

- S20: an existing hourly service between Fribourg and Neuchâtel.
- S21: an existing rush-hour service between Fribourg and Kerzers.
- S30: introduction of half-hourly service between Yverdon-les-Bains and Fribourg on weekdays (hourly on weekends), improving on existing hourly service over the same route.
- S40: introduction of half-hourly service on weekdays (hourly on weekends) between Romont FR and Fribourg.
- S50 / S51: the existing half-hourly RER Fribourg service between Palézieux and Châtel-St-Denis, with S50 trains continuing every hour to Bulle.
- S52: an existing weekday rush-hour service between Châtel-St-Denis and Bulle.
- S60: the existing hourly RER Fribourg service between Broc and Montbovon.

The 2017 timetable change saw the S21 extended from Kerzers to Ins and increased to hourly service on weekdays. Thus paired with the S20, this created a half-hourly schedule between Fribourg and Ins. The RER Sud portion of the network was simplified: the S51 and S52 were eliminated, with the S50 running on an hourly schedule between Palézieux and Montbovon. The hourly S60 was extended from Bulle to Palézieux on peak periods, combining with the S50 for half-hourly service.

The 2017 changes to the southern part of the network were largely reversed in December 2019, with the S50 and S60 again terminating at Bulle. The S51 returned as an hourly service between Bulle and Montbovon. These changes paved the way for the suspension of the S60 on 6 April 2021 to allow the conversion of the Bulle–Broc line from 1,000 mm (3 ft 3 3/8 in) to 1,435 mm (4 ft 8 1/2 in). Once complete, trains could run through from Fribourg to Broc via Bulle.

In December 2021, the S20 and S21 were extended south from Fribourg to Romont FR, replacing the S40. In addition, the hourly Bulle–Freibourg RegioExpress was extended from Freibourg to Düdingen. In December 2022, the Bulle–Broc line reopened as far as Broc-Village, and the two RegioExpress lines, given the names RE2 and RE3, were extended there. Improved infrastructure around Bulle permitted the extension of the S50 from Bulle to Montbovon, while the S51 was relaunched as an hourly (on weekdays) service between Palézieux and Gruyères. Service to Broc-Fabrique began on 24 August, 2023.

== Lines ==
Network (2024)

As of December 2023 the network consists of the following lines:

- RE2: Broc-Fabrique–Bulle–Romont FR–Fribourg/Freiburg–Bern
- RE3: Broc-Fabrique–Bulle–Romont FR–Fribourg–Düdingen
- S20: Neuchâtel–Ins–Murten/Morat–Fribourg–Romont FR
- S21: Ins–Murten/Morat–Fribourg–Romont FR
- S30: Yverdon-les-Bains–Estavayer-le-Lac–Payerne–Fribourg
- S50: Palézieux–Châtel-St-Denis–Bulle–Montbovon
- S51: Palézieux–Châtel-St-Denis–Bulle–Gruyères

All trains are operated by Transports publics Fribourgeois except for the S30, which Swiss Federal Railways operates.
