= Montbovon railway station =

Railway station in Haut-Intyamon, Switzerland

Montbovon
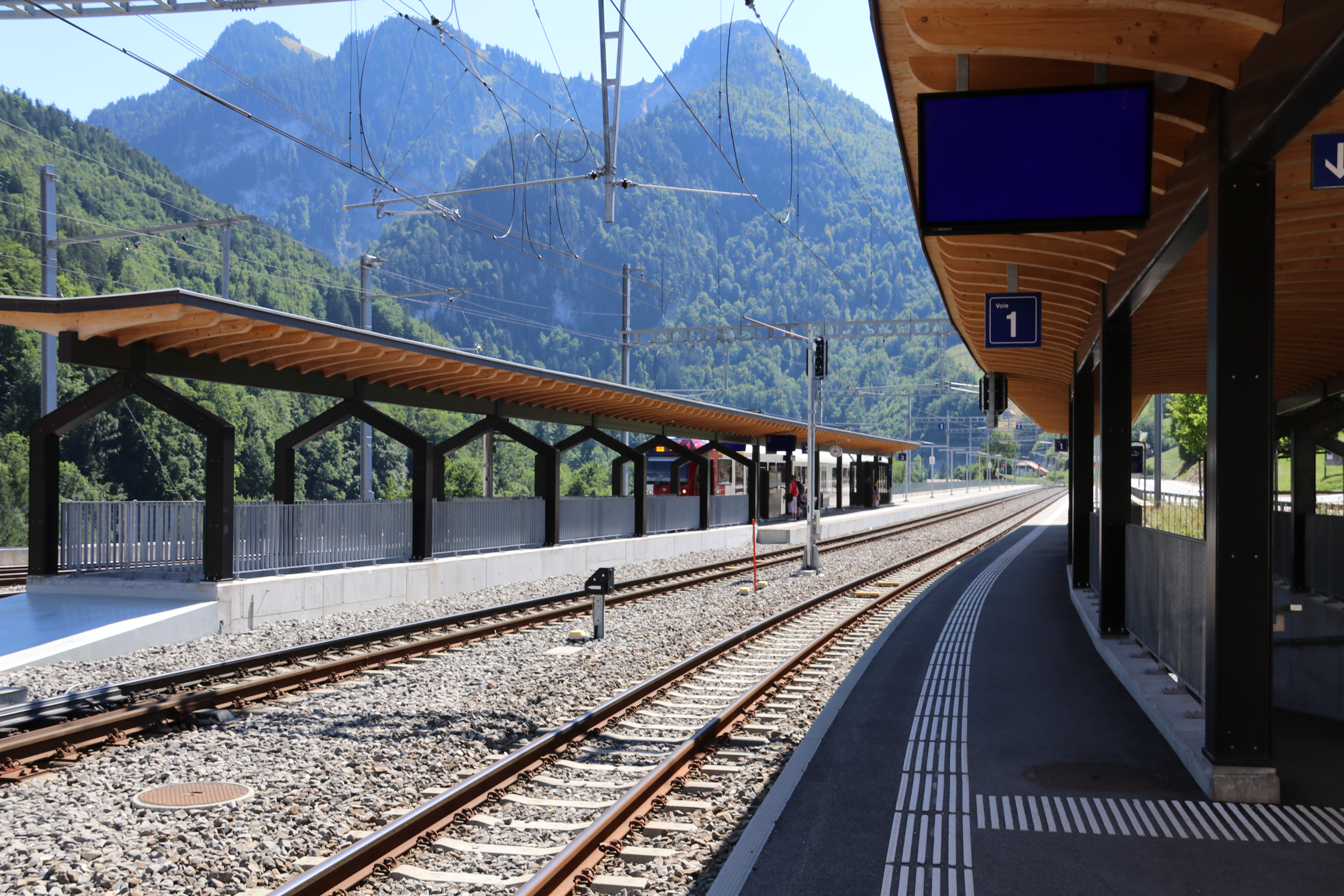
- The station in 2022

General information
- Location: Haut-Intyamon, Fribourg; Switzerland
- Coordinates: 46°29′08″N 7°02′32″E
- Elevation: 797 m (2,615 ft)
- Owner: Transports publics Fribourgeois
- Lines: Palézieux–Bulle–Montbovon line; Montreux–Lenk im Simmental line
- Distance: 36.7 km (22.8 mi) from Châtel-St-Denis; 22.1 km (13.7 mi) from Montreux
- Platforms: 3; 1 side platform; 1 island platform
- Tracks: 3
- Train operators: Transports publics Fribourgeois; Montreux Oberland Bernois Railway

Construction
- Accessible: Yes

Other information
- Station code: 8504070 (MTB)
- Fare zone: 22/23 (frimobil)

History
- Opened: 23 July 1903

Passengers
- 2023: 840 per weekday (MOB, TPF)

Services
Preceding station	RER Fribourg	Following station
Terminus	S50	Lessoc towards Palézieux
Preceding station	Montreux Oberland Bernois Railway	Following station
Château-d'Oex towards Interlaken Ost	GoldenPass Express	Montreux Terminus
La Tine towards Zweisimmen	PE30	Les Sciernes towards Montreux
Rossinière towards Château-d'Oex	R34	Les Avants towards Montreux
Location

Montbovon railway station (French: Gare de Montbovon), is a railway station in the municipality of Haut-Intyamon, in the Swiss canton of Fribourg. It is the terminus station on the 1,000 mm (3 ft 3 3/8 in) metre gauge Palézieux–Bulle–Montbovon railway line of Transports publics Fribourgeois (TPF) and an intermediate stop on the Montreux–Lenk im Simmental line of Montreux Oberland Bernois Railway (MOB).

== History ==
The station building was built in 1903 by Ody & Fils by the design of the architects Broillet & Wulffleff. The station was opened by the Chemins de fer électriques de la Gruyère at the same time as the Tour-de-Trême to Montbovon section of the Palézieux-Bulle-Montbovon line, on 23 July 1903. The Les Avants to Montbovon section of the MOB line was inaugurated a few months later, on 10 October 1903.

At the outset of World War 2, the Swiss Army established a reserve of steam locomotives at Montbovon. This included G 3/3 8 and Mallet G 2×2/2 2, both from the recently electrified Lausanne–Échallens–Bercher railway (LEB). The former locomotive was new to that line, and after post-war industrial use is now back hauling heritage trains on the LEB. The Mallet had been acquired by the LEB from the Yverdon–Ste-Croix railway, and was scrapped after its war-time service.

Due to its high level of use and its role at the junction of two strategic metre gauge lines, the station underwent a major renovation between 2017 and 2019. In order to comply with the Swiss Disability Discrimination Act, a new underpass has been built under the station, leading to the platforms via gently sloping ramps. The platforms have been extended to 214 and 259 metres, raised and fitted with canopies. The work is estimated to have cost CHF 32 million, 26 million from TPF and 6 million from MOB.

== Services ==
As of the December 2023 timetable change, the following services stop at Montbovon:

- RER Fribourg S50: hourly service to Palézieux.
- GoldenPass Express: 4 daily round-trips between Montreux and Interlaken Ost.
- Panorama Express/Regio: half-hourly service during peak hours or hourly service between Montreux and Château-d'Oex and hourly service to Zweisimmen.

== Bibliography ==
- Wägli, Hans G.; Jacobi, Sébastien (2010). Schienennetz Schweiz - Bahnprofil Schweiz CH+ [Swiss rail network] (in German) (3rd ed.). Zürich: AS Verlag. ISBN 978-3-909111-74-9.
