= Palézieux railway station =

Railway station in Oron, Switzerland

Palézieux
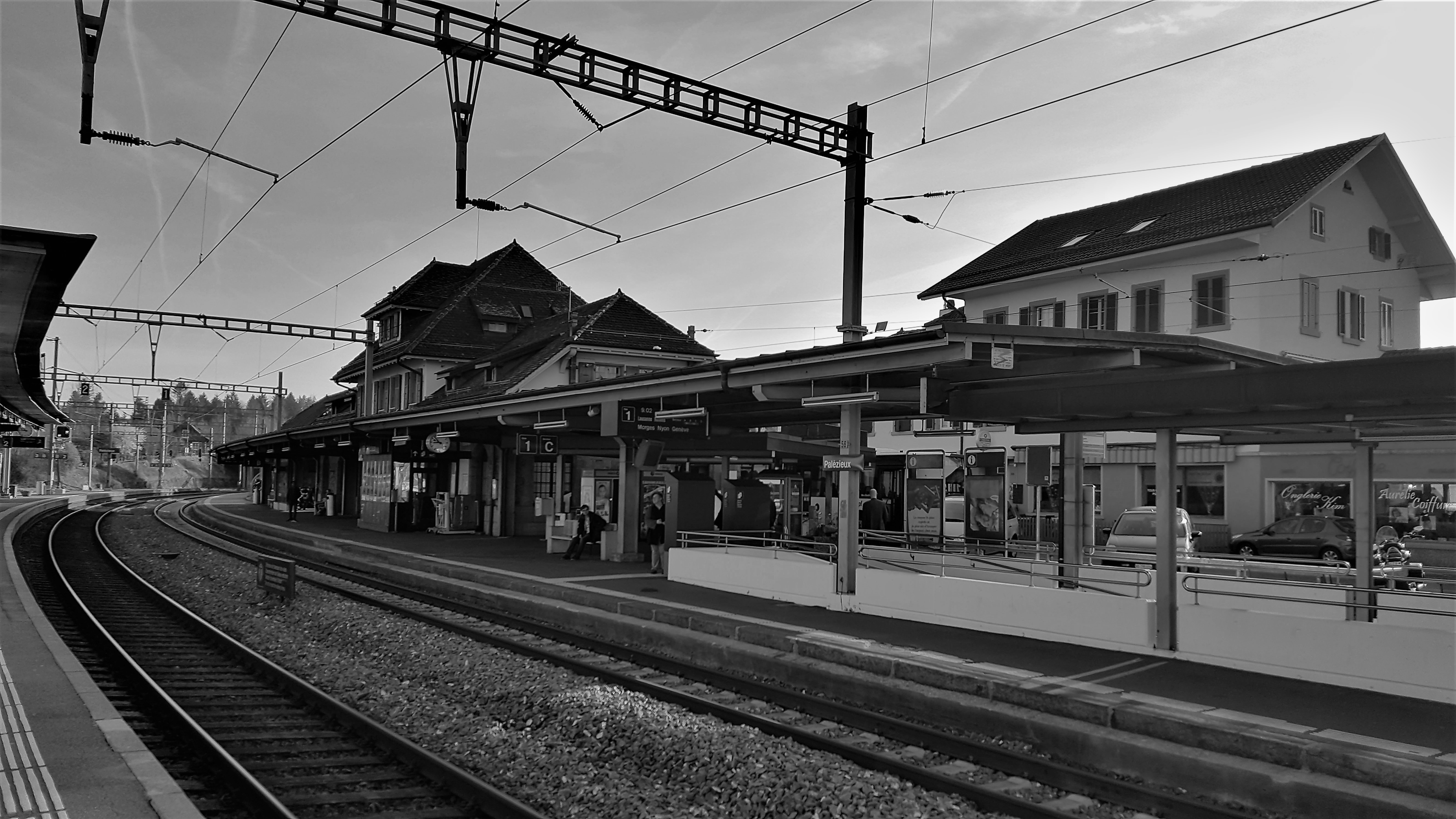
- The station building in 2017

General information
- Location: Oron; Switzerland
- Coordinates: 46°32′34″N 6°50′16″E
- Elevation: 668 m (2,192 ft)
- Owner: Swiss Federal Railways
- Lines: Palézieux–Bulle–Montbovon line; Lausanne–Bern line; Palézieux–Lyss line
- Distance: 20.6 km (12.8 mi) from Lausanne
- Platforms: 3 (SBB); 2 (TPF)
- Tracks: 5
- Train operators: Swiss Federal Railways; Transports publics Fribourgeois
- Connections: CarPostal SA buses; Transports publics Fribourgeois buses

Construction
- Parking: Yes (182 spaces)
- Cycle facilities: Yes (74 spaces)
- Accessible: Yes

Other information
- Station code: 8504014 (PAL)
- Fare zone: 63 (mobilis); 93 (frimobil)

History
- Opened: 1862 (SBB); 1903 (TPF)

Passengers
- 2023: 7'800 per weekday (RegionAlps, SBB, TPF)

Services
Preceding station	SBB CFF FFS	Following station
Lausanne towards Geneva Airport	IR 15	Romont FR towards Lucerne
Vevey towards Le Châble VS	VosAlpes Express	Romont FR towards Fribourg/Freiburg
Preceding station	RER Vaud	Following station
Puidoux towards Lausanne	S40	Vauderens towards Fribourg/Freiburg
Moreillon towards Lausanne	S41	Oron towards Fribourg/Freiburg
Puidoux towards Vevey	R7	Terminus
Puidoux towards Allaman	R8	Palézieux-Village towards Payerne
Puidoux towards Allaman	R9	Palézieux-Village towards Murten/Morat
Preceding station	RER Fribourg	Following station
Terminus	S50	Bossonnens towards Montbovon
Terminus	S51	Bossonnens towards Gruyères
Route map
Location

Palézieux railway station serves the village of Palézieux, within the municipality of Oron, in the canton of Vaud, Switzerland. The station is located at the junction of the standard gauge Lausanne–Bern and Palézieux–Lyss lines of Swiss Federal Railways (SBB), 20.6 kilometres (12.8 mi) from Lausanne. The station is also the terminus of the 1,000 mm (3 ft 3 3/8 in) gauge Palézieux–Bulle–Montbovon line of Transports publics Fribourgeois. Palézieux's other station, Palézieux-Village, is located to the north on the Palézieux–Lyss line.

The station has two parts, one for the national railways (SBB) and the other for the metre gauge line; it is the only station on the Transports publics Fribourgeois network which is in the canton of Vaud. There are three through-platforms on the SBB mainline, with further platforms at the adjacent metre gauge railway terminus. The station is staffed by SBB Monday to Friday. There are 182 car parking spaces.

== Services ==
As of the December 2024 timetable change, the following services stop at Palézieux:

- InterRegio: hourly service between Geneva Airport and Lucerne.
- VosAlpes Express: daily direct service between Le Châble VS and Fribourg/Freiburg on weekends between December and April.
- RER Vaud:
  - S40 / S41: half-hourly service between Lausanne and Fribourg/Freiburg.
  - R7: hourly service to Vevey.
  - R8 / R9: half-hourly service between Allaman and Payerne, with every other train continuing from Payerne to Murten/Morat.
- RER Fribourg S50 / S51: half-hourly service on weekdays and hourly service on weekends to Gruyères and hourly service to Montbovon.
