= Palézieux–Bulle–Montbovon railway line =

Railway line in Switzerland

Palézieux–Bulle–Montbovon
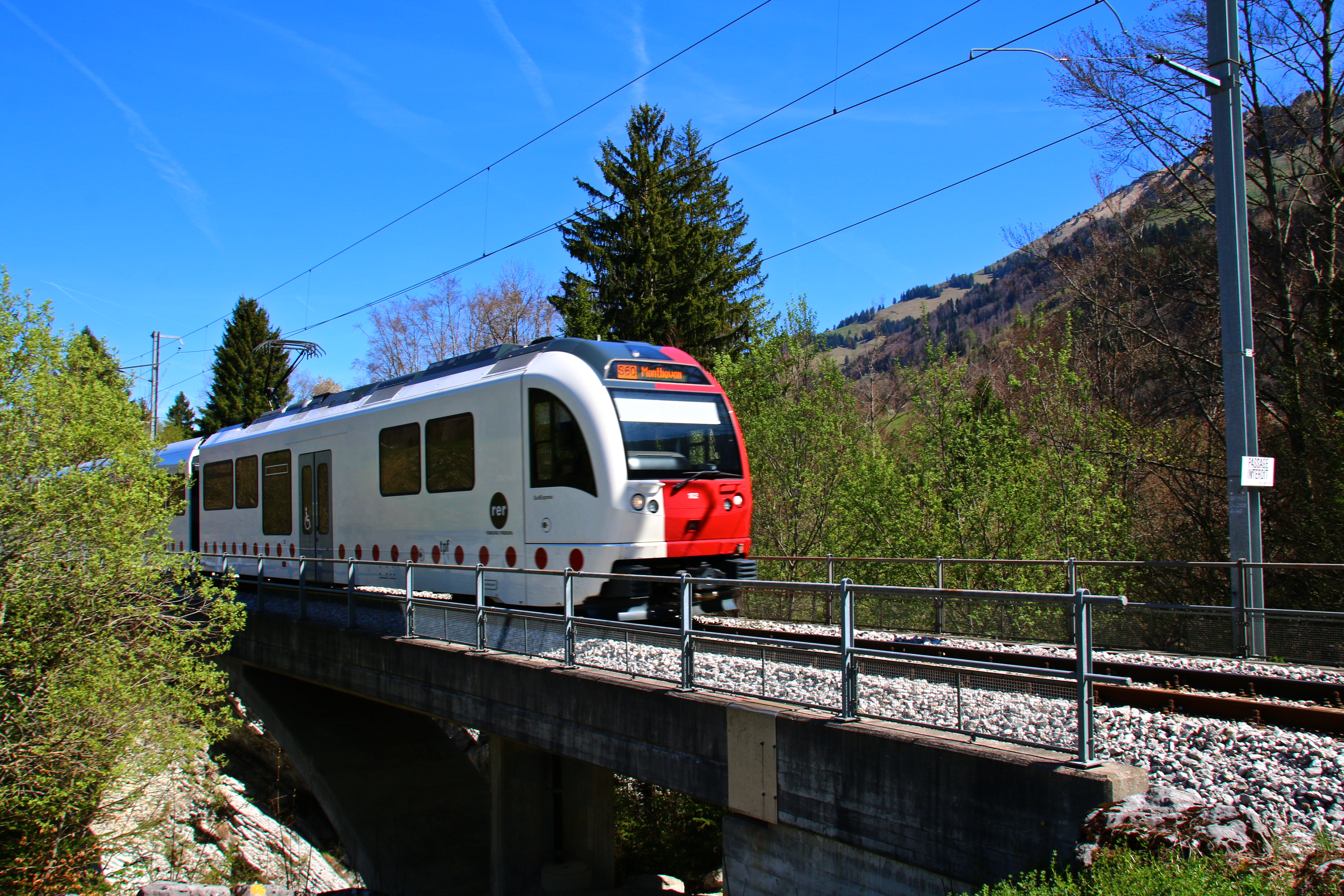
- RER Fribourg S60 near Gruyères in 2017

Overview
- Owner: Transports publics Fribourgeois
- Line number: 253
- Termini: Palézieux; Montbovon
- Stations: 25

History
- Opened: 29 April 1901

Technical
- Line length: 43.2 km (26.8 mi)
- Track gauge: 1,000 mm (3 ft 3 3/8 in) metre gauge
- Electrification: 900 V DC overhead contact

The Palézieux–Bulle–Montbovon railway line is a 1,000 mm (3 ft 3 3/8 in) metre gauge railway line in the canton of Fribourg, Switzerland. It runs 43.2 kilometres (26.8 mi) from Palézieux to Montbovon. The line is owned and operated by Transports publics Fribourgeois (TPF).

== History ==
The first section between Palézieux and Châtel-St-Denis opened on 29 April 1901. It was built by the Chemin de fer Châtel-St-Denis–Palézieux (CP). The Chemins de fer électriques de la Gruyère (CEG) built another line east from Châtel-St-Denis to Vuadens, opening on 23 July 1903. At the same time, the CEG opened a line north from Montbovon to La Tour-de-Trême. The CEG closed the gap in 1904, completing sections between Vaudens and Bulle on 14 July and Bulle and La Tour-de-Trême on 21 September. The CEG acquired the CP on 20 December 1907.

In 1942, the CEG merged with two other companies to form the Chemins de fer fribourgeois Gruyère–Fribourg–Morat (GFM). The GFM, in turn, became the Transports publics Fribourgeois (TPF) in 2000.

== Route ==
The line begins in Palézieux, where it terminates across the platform from the standard gauge Lausanne–Bern and Palézieux–Lyss lines of Swiss Federal Railways. From there the line runs east to Châtel-Saint-Denis, where there was an interchange with the St-Légier–Châtel-St-Denis railway line from 1904–1969, when it was abandoned. The line then turns northeast, skirting the Swiss Prealps, to Bulle. At Bulle it interchanges with two other TPF lines: the standard gauge Bulle–Romont railway line, and the standard gauge Bulle–Broc railway line, another former CEG branch that was rebuilt in 2021–2023. From Bulle, the line turns south, and continues to Montbovon, where it meets the Montreux–Lenk im Simmental line of the Montreux Oberland Bernois Railway.
