= Transports publics Fribourgeois =

Public transport company in Switzerland

Transports publics fribourgeois
- Type: Private
- Founded: 2000
- Headquarters: Fribourg, Switzerland
- Products: railway transportation
- Website: https://www.tpf.ch/

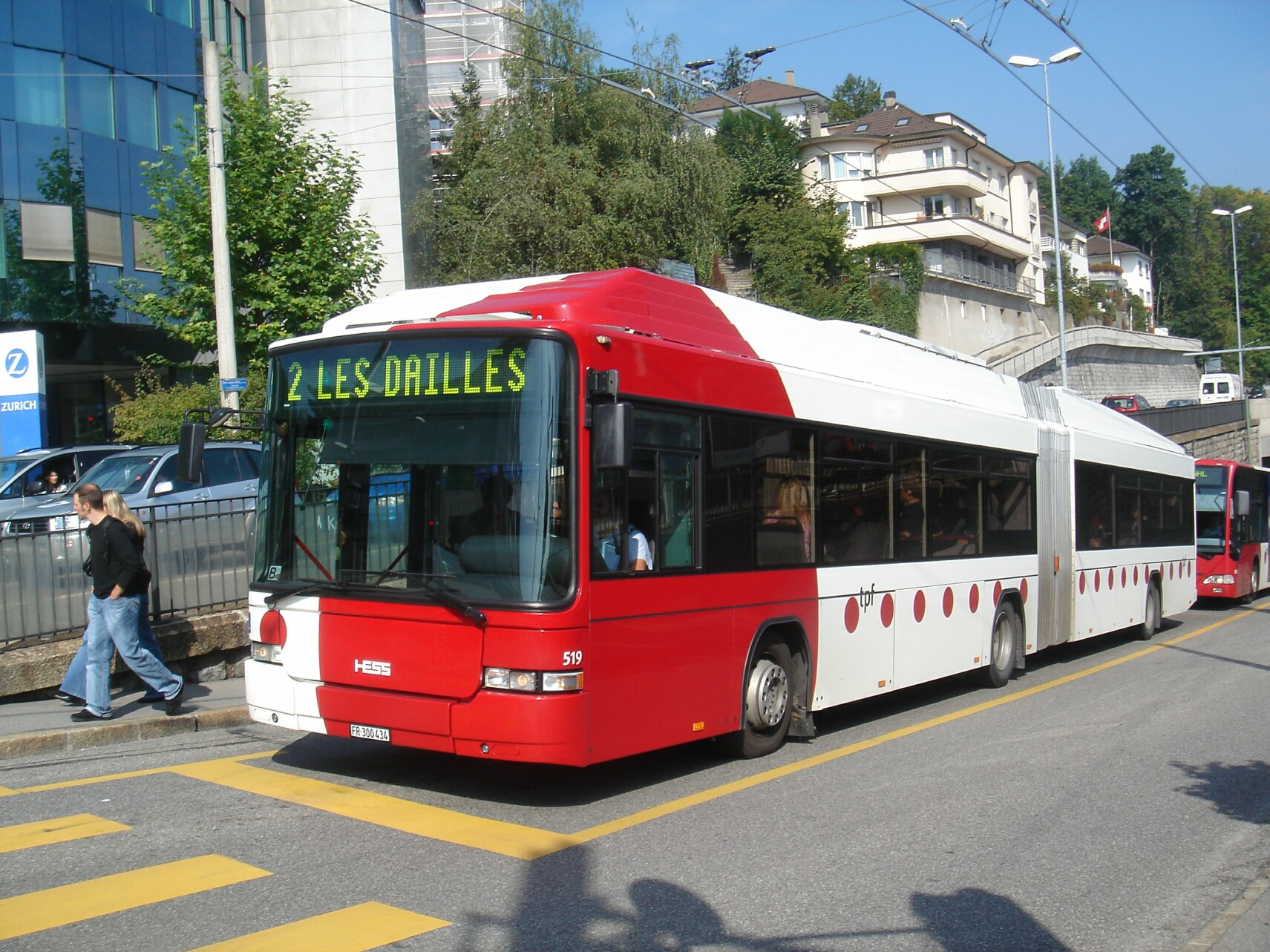
TPF Duobus 519 Freiburg 2006 Sept

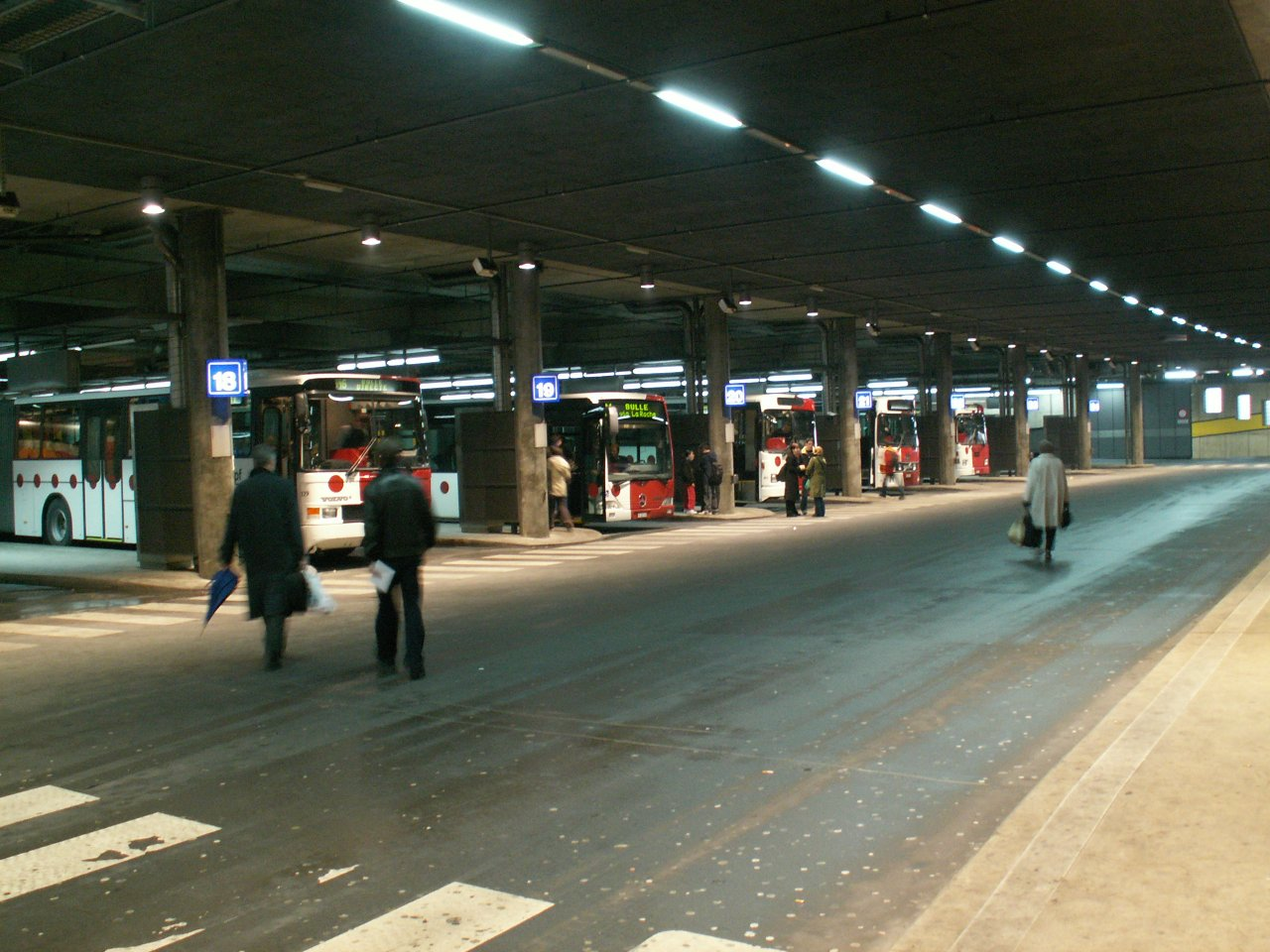
TPF station

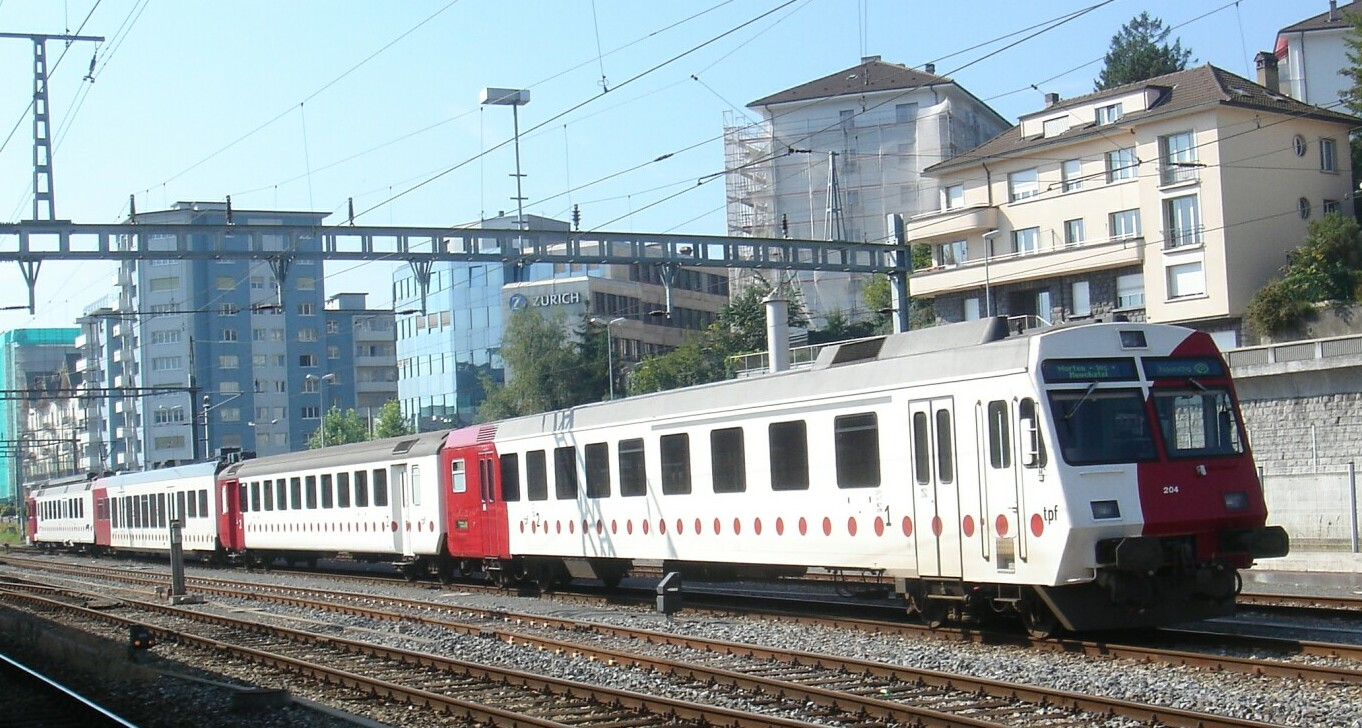

The Transports Publics Fribourgeois (TPF) is a renaming of the former Chemins de fer Fribourgeois Gruyère-Fribourg-Morat when the municipal Transport en commun de Fribourg (TF) was absorbed in 2000.

== Lines ==
The company is a railway operator with both narrow and standard gauge lines centred in the town of Bulle. The main line of the narrow gauge network runs from Palézieux railway station (at Palézieux-Gare), on the SBB main line from Bern to Lausanne, via Châtel-St-Denis and Bulle to Montbovon. The short Bulle - Broc branch, which leaves this line between Bulle and La Tour-de-Trême, serves the nearby Nestlé (formerly Cailler) chocolate factory. The company also operates two standard-gauge lines, between Bulle and Romont and Fribourg - Ins via Murten/Morat. Trains on the latter route have been extended and now operate a regular interval service Fribourg - Murten - Ins - Neuchatel, taking them on to BLS tracks (Ins - Neuchatel).

The Palézieux - Montbovon line was opened throughout in 1904. The Chemin de fer Châtel-St-Denis-Palézieux (CP) and the Chemin de fer Châtel-St-Denis-Bulle-Montbovon (CBM) amalgamated in 1907 to form the Chemins de fer électriques de la Gruyère (CEG), adding the Bulle - Broc branch line in 1912. The two standard gauge operations joined in a further amalgamation on 1 January 1942, when together they formed the Chemins de fer Fribourgeois, Gruyère-Fribourg-Morat (GFM).

The closure of a connecting line took place in 1969, when the section of the Chemins de fer Veveysans from Chatel-St-Denis to Vevey on Lake Geneva was closed. If it had survived, it would nowadays almost certainly have become a useful tourist route from the lake to the chocolate factory (and would link Nestlé's HQ at Vevey with one of its main factories). One contributing factor was the political and human geography of Switzerland (Vevey is in Canton Vaud but Chatel St Denis is in Canton Fribourg). Evidence of the existence of this line still exists at Chatel St Denis, where Bulle - Palézieux trains have to reverse (Bulle - Vevey was the 'direct' straight line route).

TPF operations are centered on Bulle which has a depot, workshops and offers a connection to the standard gauge line to Romont as well as express bus services to the capital. The transfer to the Montreux–Lenk im Simmental line takes place in Montbovon.

Today, on both systems, passenger traffic is carried out by electric units, single driving cars, coupled at busy times to trailers. Standard gauge goods traffic can transfer to the metre gauge where the wagons are transported on carrier trucks. The company still has few metre gauge wagons, all now connected with railway engineering.

== Locomotives and rolling stock ==
A few vehicles inherited from the former companies and even dating back to pre - First World War days are in use for shunting and departmental use.

In August 2012, TPF, together with the BAM, the MOB and Travys, called tenders for 17 narrow-gauge trains. It was announced that Stadler had won the contract for CHF 150 million in March 2013. TPF will be supplied with six three-unit sets with a continuous output of 1340 kW and a top speed of 100 km/h. The first trains will be delivered in early 2015 and will replace older stock.

Metre Gauge Locomotives and Rolling Stock

No.	Name	Class	Builders details	Date	Rebuilt	Notes.
11		Te 2/2	GFM/MFO	1913	1991	Works No. 33.
12		Te 2/2	GFM/AI	1913	1954	
13		Te 4/4	SWS/AI/GFM	1901	1959	
14		Te 4/4	SWS/AI/GFM	1901	1978	
15		Tm 2/2	Schöma/Deutz	1971	1981	
16		Tm 2/2	CFD Industries	1987		
101	Ville de Bulle	GDe 4/4	SLM/BBC	1983		Out of Service from 10.12.06, Sold to MOB, April 2007, No.6005
102	Neirivue	GDe 4/4	SLM/BBC	1983		Out of Service from 10.12.06, Sold to MOB, April 2007, No.6006
115		Be 4/4	SWS/Alioth	1905	1959	Electric Railcar, 46 seats. Used for historic train operations(See:Retro-Train), but also still used for workaday works/engineering duties
116		Be 4/4	SWS/Alioth	1922	1951/1999	Preserved Electric Railcar, 46 seats. (See:Retro-Train)
121	Remaufens	BDe 4/4	ACMV/ABB	1992		
122	La Tour-de-Trême	BDe 4/4	ACMV/ABB	1992		
123	Broc	BDe 4/4	ACMV/ABB	1996		
124	Vuadens	BDe 4/4	ACMV/ABB	1996		
131		Be 4/4	SWS/BBC	1943		
132		Be 4/4	SWS/BBC	1943		Withdrawn
141	Gruyères^{1}	BDe 4/4	Schindler/SAAS	1972		
142	Semsales	BDe 4/4	Schindler/SAAS	1972		
151	La Gruyère^{1}	Be 4/4	ACMV/BBC	1977		
152	Châtel St. Denis	Be 4/4	ACMV/BBC	1977		
221		Bt	ACMV/BBC	1992		Voiture Pilote (Driving Trailer)
222		Bt	ACMV/BBC	1992		Voiture Pilote (Driving Trailer)
223		Bt	ACMV/BBC	1992		Voiture Pilote (Driving Trailer)
224		Bt	Vevey/ABB	1996		Voiture Pilote (Driving Trailer)
225		Bt	ACMV/BBC	1996		Voiture Pilote (Driving Trailer)
226		Bt	Vevey/ABB	1996		Voiture Pilote (Driving Trailer)
232		B2	GFM	1919		Preserved Coach (See:Retro Train)
235		B2	SWS	1903		Preserved Coach (See:Retro Train)
237		B2	SWS	1905		Preserved Coach (See:Retro Train)
245		Brs	SIG/R+J	1931	1991	Preserved Coach (See:Retro Train), ex-Brünigbahn
247		Brs	SIG	1932	1985	Preserved Coach (See:Retro Train), ex-Brünigbahn
251		Bt	SIG/SAAS	1977		Voiture Pilote (Driving Trailer)
252		Bt	SIG/SAAS	1977		Voiture Pilote (Driving Trailer)
253		Bt	SIG/SWP/BBC	1981		Voiture Pilote (Driving Trailer)
254		Bt	SIG/SWP/BBC	1981		Voiture Pilote (Driving Trailer)
255		Bt	SIG/SWP/BBC	1981		Voiture Pilote (Driving Trailer)
256		Bt	SIG/SWP/BBC	1981		Voiture Pilote (Driving Trailer)
401		DZ	SWS	1912		Post/Baggage Car
402		DZ	SWS	1912		Post/Baggage Car

^{1}Gruyère is the name of the Region while Gruyères stands for the small town, situated between Bulle and Montbovon

=== Abbreviations ===
- ACMV / Vevey : Ateliers de constructions mécaniques de Vevey / Vevey Technologies (now Bombardier)
- AI : Electrizitätsgesellschaft Alioth, Münchenstein
- BBC / ABB : Brown Boveri & Cie / Asea Brown Boveri (later ADtranz, then Bombardier)
- MFO : Maschinenfabrik Oerlikon (later BBC)
- SAAS : Société Anonyme des Ateliers de Sécheron, Geneva.
- SIG : Schweizerische Industriegesellschaft, Neuhausen am Rheinfall (now Alstom)
- SWS : Schweizerische Wagons- und Aufzügefabrik, Schlieren (closed)

Standard Gauge Locomotives and Rolling Stock

Number	Name	Class	Builders details	Air cond.	Date	Rebuilt	Notes.
82		Tm2/2	RACO/Mercedes		1964	1973	Aebi Works No.1634 ex Von Roll 22 1973
837 084		Tm3/3	Krupp/MAN		1963		Works No.4395 ex Shell Ingolstadt 1983
85		Tm2/2	Moyse (Paris)/Deutz		1977		
237 087		Tm2/2	Stadler/Adtranz		2000		Works No. 532 ex-MThB 236 649 in 2003
217 091		Ee2/2	SIG/BBC		1960		
161		ABDe4/4	SIG/BBC		1946	1965	Seats 1st/2nd:16/32
162		ABDe4/4	SIG/BBC		1946	1965	scrapped
163		ABDe4/4	SIG/BBC		1946	1965	scrapped
164		ABDe4/4	SIG/BBC		1947	1965	
166		ABe4/4	SIG/BBC		1947		
167		ABDe4/4	SIG/BBC		1948		scrapped
567 171	La Sarine	RBDe4/4	SIG/SWS/BBC	X	1983		two cabs, front door
567 172	Vully	RBDe4/4	SIG/SWS/BBC	X	1983		two cabs, front door
567 173	La Glâne	RBDe4/4	SIG/SWS/BBC	X	1983		two cabs, front door, 1992 ex TRN 104
537 176		RABDe4/4	SIG/SWA/BBC/MFO/SAAS		1964		2006 ex- Thurbo/MThB 11, Die Hegau-Bodensee Bahn, named Stadt Wil
567 316		RBDe	SWP/SIG/BBC	X	1985		long-term lease from TRN
567 181		RBDe4/4	SWP/SIG/ABB	X	1991		
567 182		RBDe4/4	SWP/SIG/ABB	X	1991		
361		B	FFA		1963	2000	
362		B	FFA		1963		
364		B	SWP/SIG	X	1984		
365		B	SWP/SIG	X	1984		
366		B	FFA		1963		ex-TMR/MO 41
367		B	Stadler	X	2006		low floor
368		B	Stadler	X	2006		low floor
369		B	Stadler	X	2006		low floor
371		ABt	SWS/BBC	X	1983		front door
372		ABt	SWP/BBC		1964	2003	ex- Bt originally number 302
373		ABt	SWP/SIG/BBC	X	1985		front door
374		Bt	SWP/BBC		1964	1983	1993 ex-TRN 203
375		Bt	SWP/BBC		1964		ex- Thurbo 203 and originally GFM 301
381		ABt	SWP/SIG/ABB	X	1991		
382		ABt	SWP/SIG/ABB	X	1991		
204		ABt	SWP/SIG/BBC	X	1985		long term-lease from TRN
383		ABt	SWP/SIG/ABB	X	1991		2006 ex-TRN 206

Abbreviations (see also above listing)

- Aebi : Robert Aebi
- Asper : Victor Asper Maschinenbau

New Deliveries

Five existing motor coaches 171-173, 181-182 plus one identical vehicle RBDe 567 316 on long-term lease from TRN SA were recently modernized, incorporating new seating, air condition, information displays and video recording. The same modernization occurred with matching driving trailers 371, 373, 381, 382 and 383 ex TRN SA plus one, ABt 204, on long-term lease from TRN SA. Also the two matching coaches 364-365 were treated accordingly. First class compartment is now in the driving trailer and no longer in the motor coach, which had before been classified RABDe 537.

Three new intermediate coaches, all second class, have been delivered from Stadler and incorporate a low level centre section suitable for pram / buggy and disabled access. These cars have large windows and other facilities as featured throughout the train.

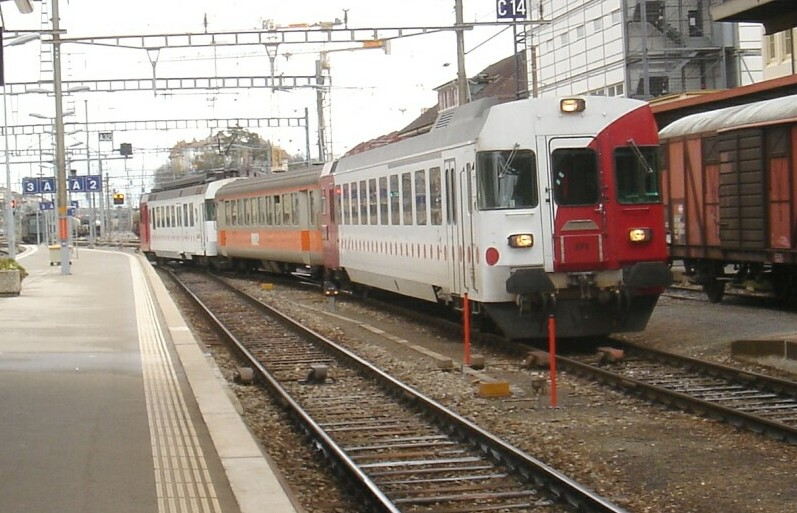
Modernized ABt 371 and RBDe 567 171 with B 362 in old livery in Neuchâtel on 29 March 2006

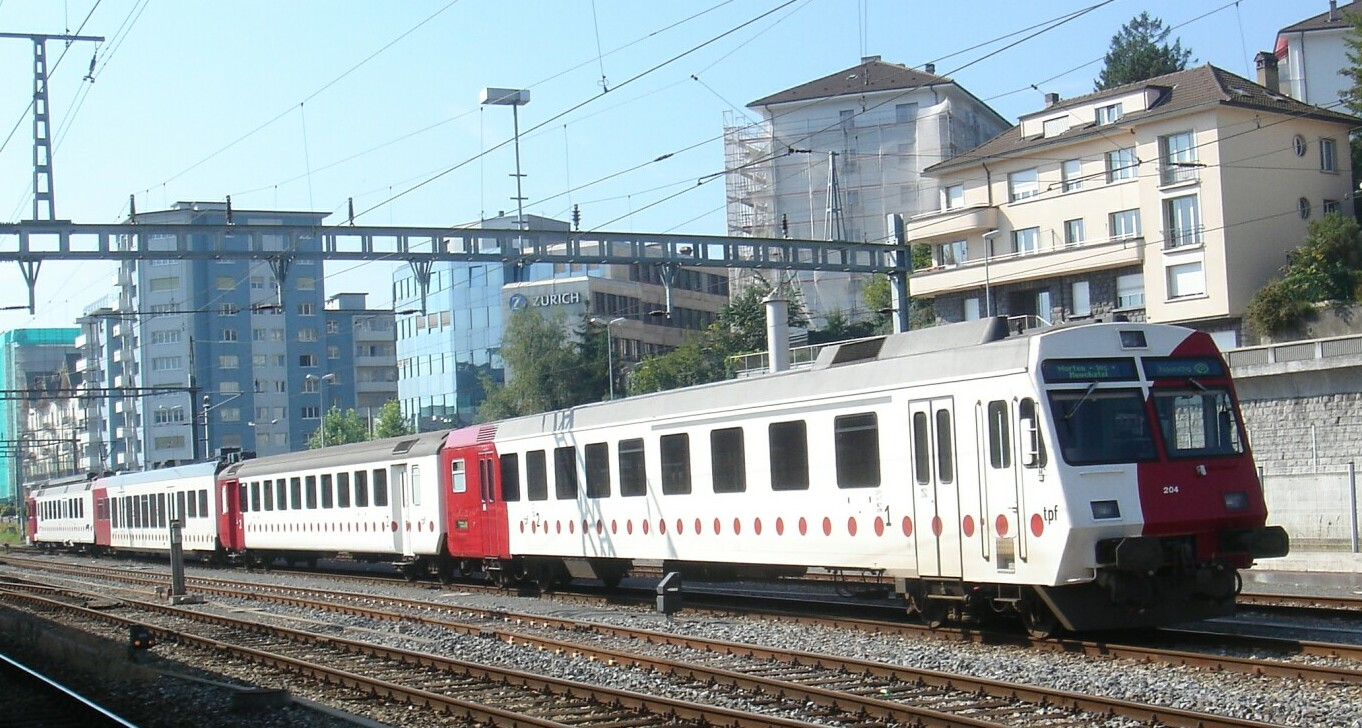
Leased and modernized RBDe 567 316 and ABt 204 with tpf B 361 and 369 in Fribourg on 29 September 2006

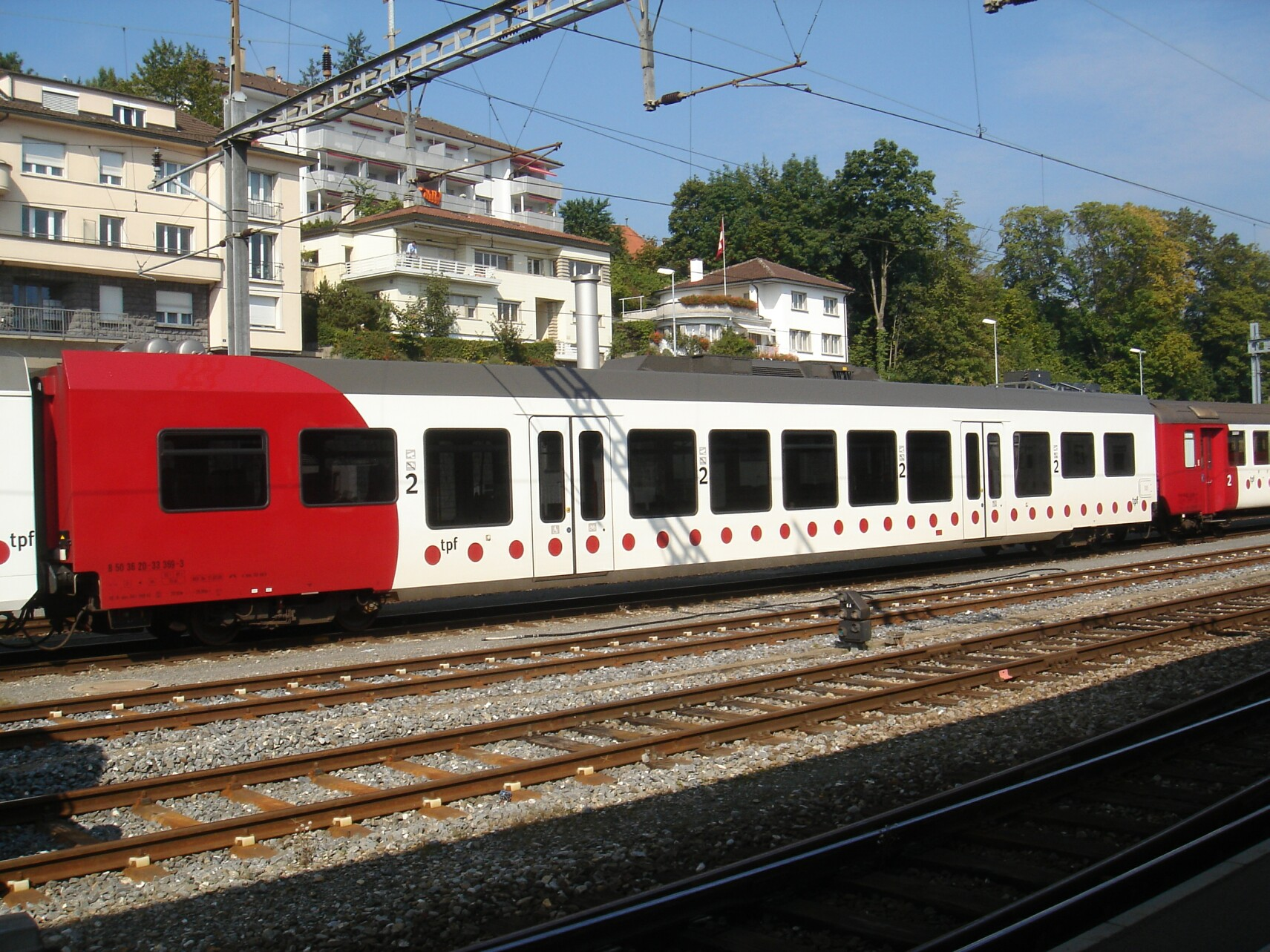
New low-floor coach B 369 on 29 September 2006 in Fribourg

== Livery ==
The trains were painted in a grey livery with a broad orange band below the windows, marked "La Gruyère", a few vehicles even still had the older green/cream livery. In 2001, the first of the repainted units appeared on the line in a plain white livery with lining and "tpf" lettering in cherry red.

== Fare structure ==
From 12 December 2006, the TPF together with SBB-CFF-FFS, BLS, CarPostal Suisse, MOB, STB and VMCV introduced a canton-wide zone fare known as "frimobil", ordered and subsidized by the canton. It was advertised as "offering freedom and mobility throughout the region".

== Vintage train ==
The company operate a "Retro Train" using vintage stock and railcar. Operating at weekends throughout the year it offers travel in a 1926-built coach named Moléjon coupled to a bar-coach named La Grevire (built in 1932), the power being supplied by an electric railcar dating from the early 1920s. Included in the price is a fondue followed by Meringues with local delicacy, Crème de Gruyère.

== Narrow gauge freight services ==
Until 10 December 2006 the company operated three main freight routes:

- To and from the Cailler chocolate factory at Broc, standard gauge wagons carried "piggy-back" on narrow gauge transporter trucks from and to Bulle. Haulage was performed by the branch electric unit of 121-124 series attaching the "piggy-backs" at Broc Fabrique.
- Timber traffic originating at Montbovon, carried "piggy-back" to Bulle, and, on occasions other traffic to and from other stations.
- Ballast traffic from Grandvillard in narrow gauge hopper cars to Gstaad.

From that date the handling of the first two freight routes was taken over by SBB Cargo, the third by MOB. Thus, the company's two GDe 4/4 locomotives, together with the hopper cars, became surplus to requirements and were sold to the MOB in April 2007. TPF is paid by SBB Cargo for conveying the standard gauge wagons on transporter trucks to/from Bulle and Montbovon by accordingly fitted motor coaches 121-124.

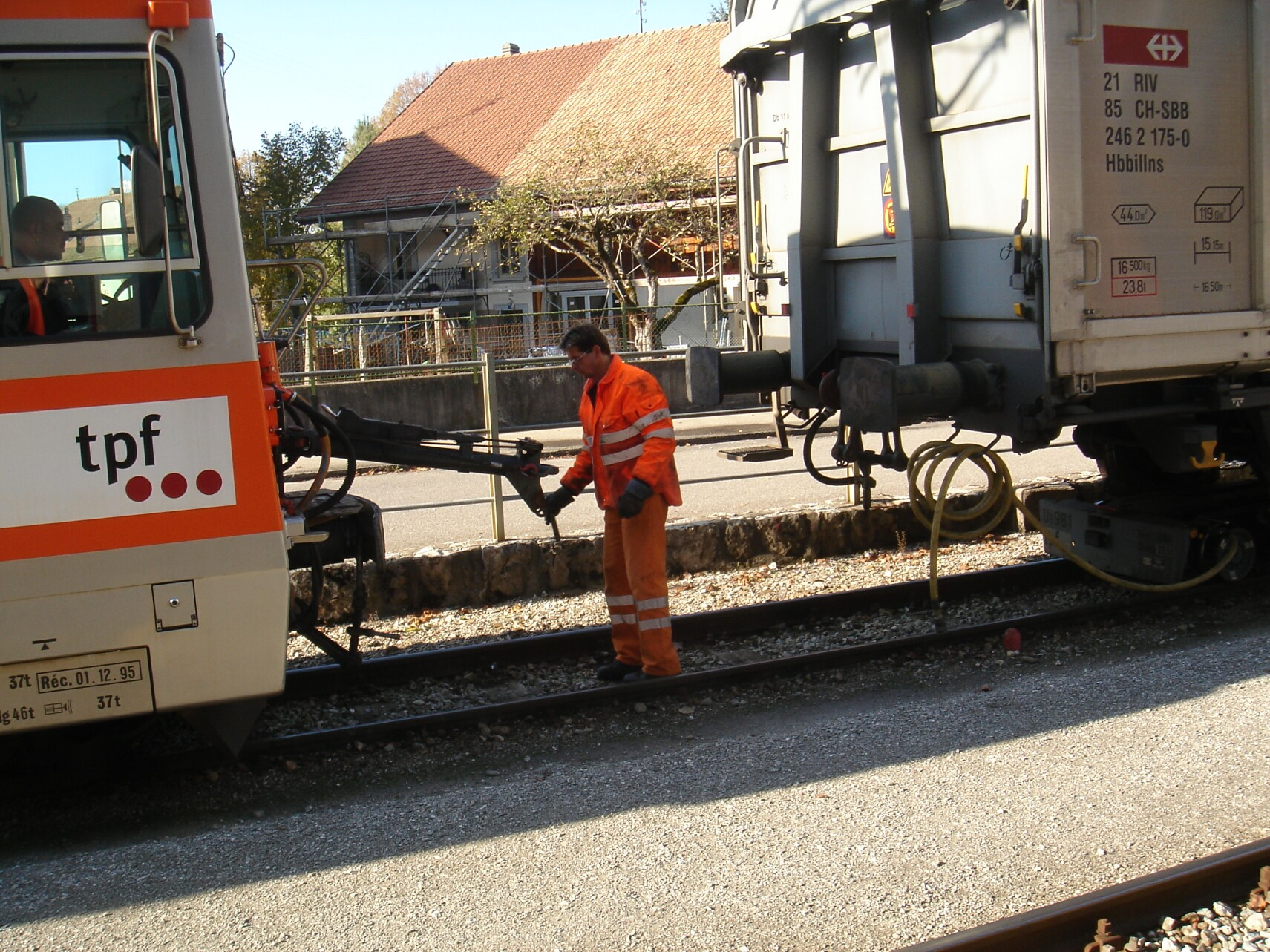
Meter gauge TPF BDe 4/4 123 is coupled to a standard gauge wagon on transporter trucks in Broc-Fabrique

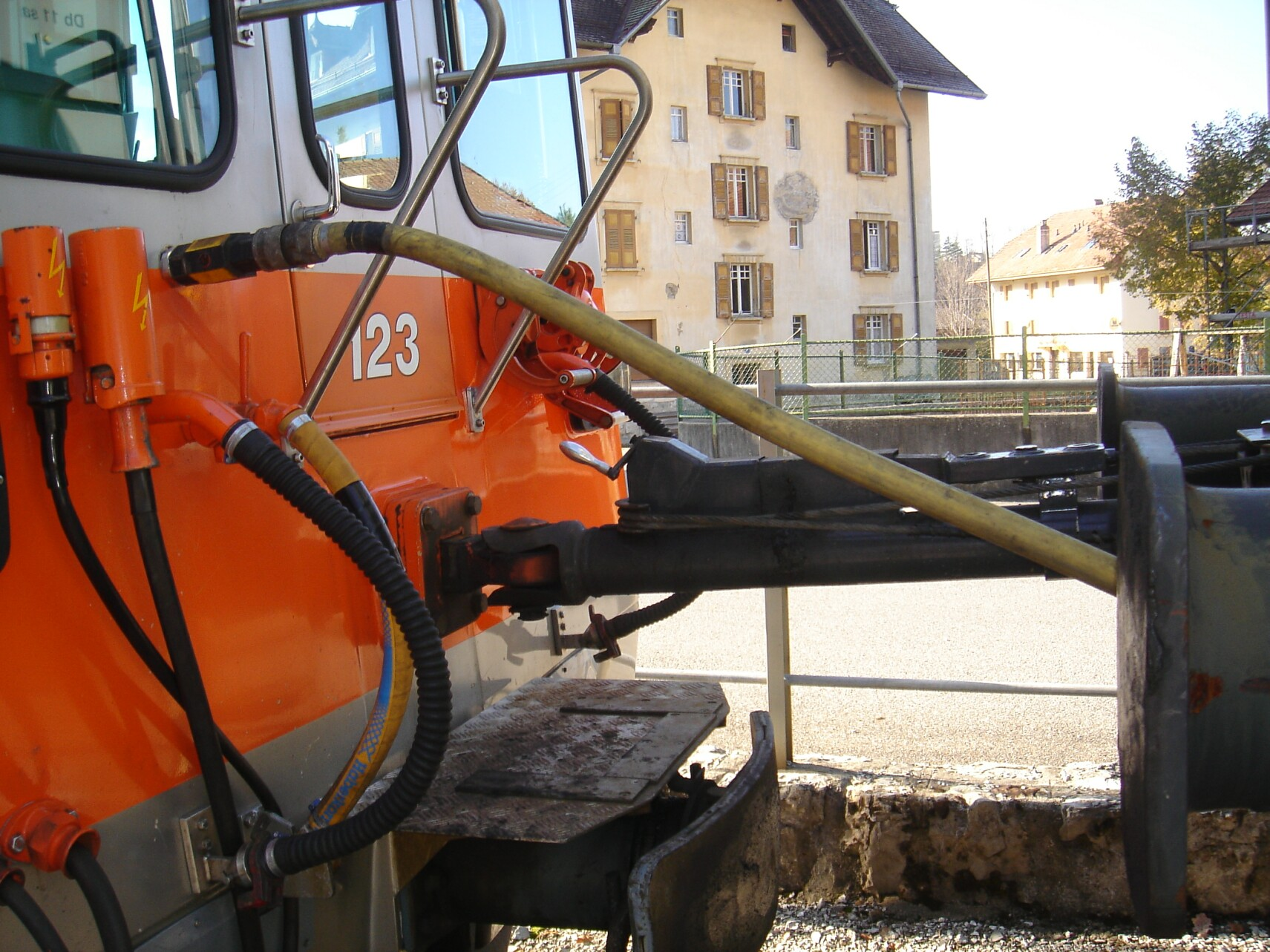
Detail view of the coupling

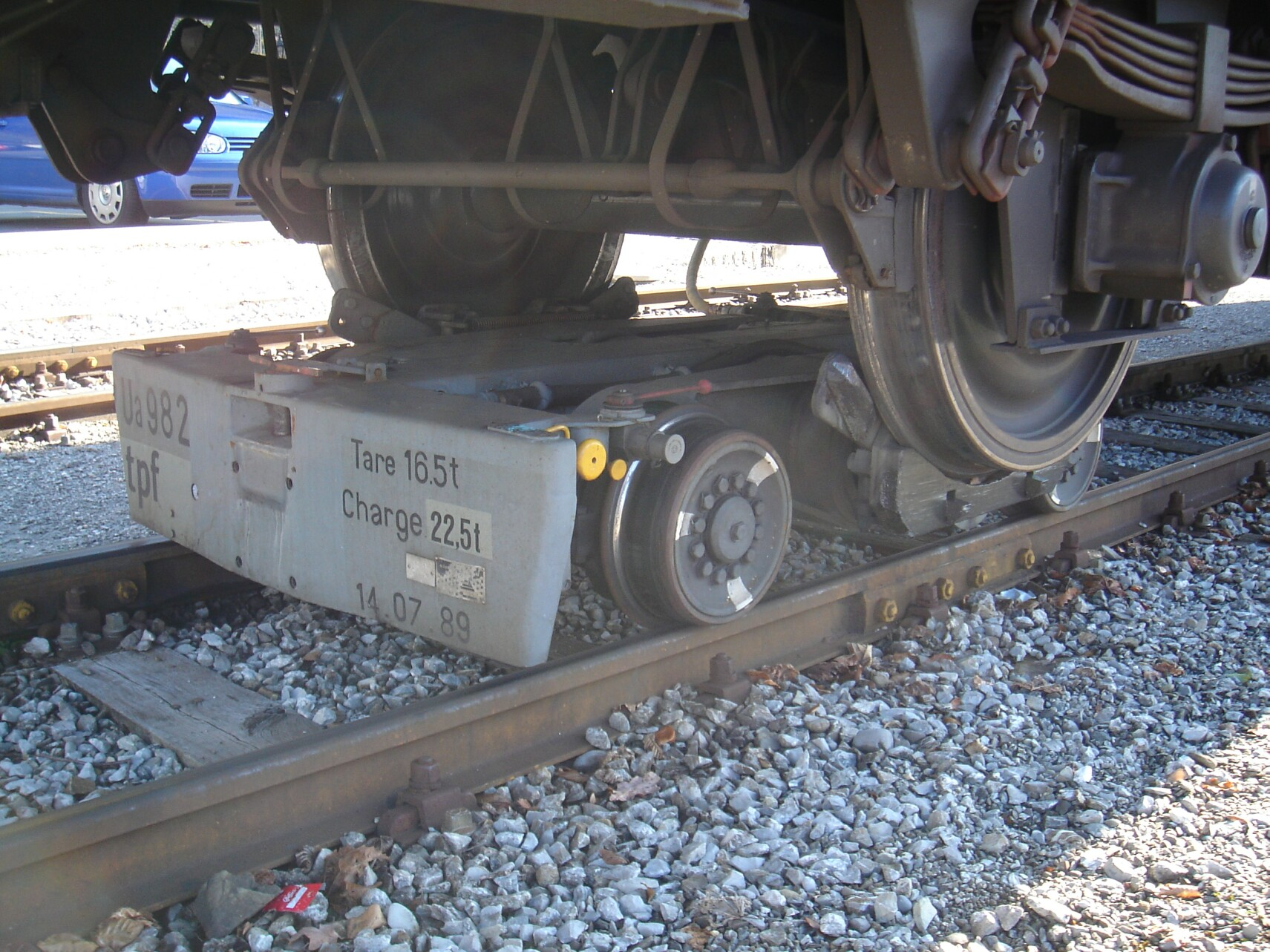
Detail view of a transporter truck

== See also ==
- Transport in Switzerland

== Sources ==
- Magazine des Transports publics Fribourgeois, No.8, January 2007.
- Grandguillaume Michel, et al., Voies étroites de Veveyse et de Gruyère. BVA, Lausanne, 1984, ISBN 2-88125-003-3
