= Fribourg–Farvagny trolleybus system =

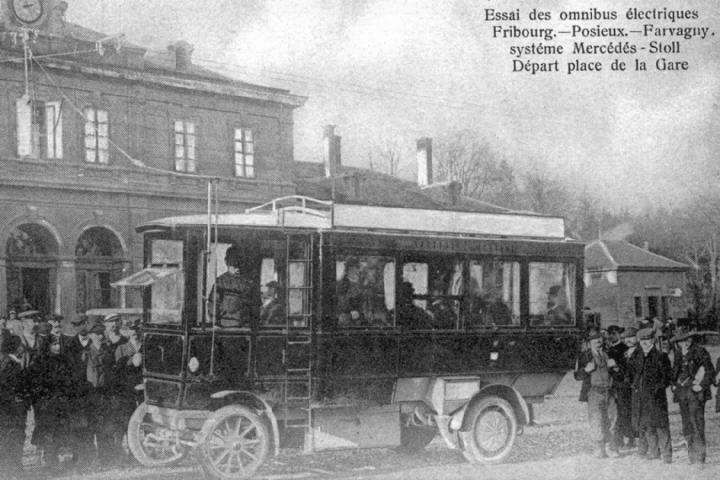
- Trolleybus 1 in front of the old Fribourg/Freiburg railway station.

Operation
- Locale: Fribourg–Farvagny, Switzerland
- Open: 1911–1912
- Close: 1932
- Status: Closed
- Routes: 1
- Operators: Compagnie des omnibus électriques Fribourg–Farvagny (F–F) (1911–1929); Chemins de fer électriques de la Gruyère (CEG) (1929–1932)

Infrastructure
- Electrification: 550 V DC

Statistics
- Route length: 12.5 km (7.8 mi)
Overview

The Fribourg–Farvagny trolleybus system (French: Train sans voie de Fribourg–Farvagny) was a pioneering interurban trolleybus line in the canton of Fribourg, Switzerland between 1911 and 1932.

The 12.5 km (7.8 mi) long line was operated for most of its life by the Compagnie des omnibus électriques Fribourg–Farvagny, and linked the old Fribourg/Freiburg railway station with Farvagny-le-Grand. It was the first trolleybus system in Switzerland, although a 200-metre-long experimental trolleybus line had operated on a demonstration basis near the Château de Chillon and the Hotel Byron in 1900.

== History ==
=== Origins ===
At the start of the 20th century, the Comité de l'initiative Fribourg–Daillettes was founded, with the goal of obtaining a concession for, and constructing, a metre gauge tramway from Fribourg to Les Daillettes, a neighborhood of Villars-sur-Glâne. It was also intended that the tramway be capable of extension to Bulle. Subsequently, however, the committee learned of the achievements of a new "trackless railway" in Austria, and in 1908 sent a delegation to inspect it.

The "trackless railway" was the Gmünd Electric Catenary-Automobile Line (German: Elektrischen Oberleitungs-Automobillinie Gmünd), which had been opened in July 1907 as the first network based on the Mercédès-Électrique-Stoll system. As a consequence of the inspection, the committee decided in 1909 to pass up the tramway concession in favour of trolleybuses. Calculations had shown that construction costs for a trolleybus system were likely to be only a third of those of a tramway.

The new trolleybus line was proposed to lead from Fribourg via Daillettes to Farvagny. Prior to the bridge over the Glâne, a branch line about one km (0.6 mi) in length was planned to the hamlet of Sainte-Apolline, also part of Villars-sur-Glâne. With these transport connections, a noodle factory might be developed at Sainte-Apolline, and relied upon for goods traffic.

=== Opening ===
On 31 August 1910, the committee received a concession valid up to 1 September 1915, which in 1912 was finally extended to 1 February 1932. The 7.4 km (4.6 mi) long section from Fribourg to Posieux went into service as the first part of the line. Test runs on this section began on 15 December 1911, and on 30 December 1911 the opening ceremony was held, before regular services began on 4 January 1912. The depot was located in La Glâne.

The second, Posieux–Magnedens (Es Bous) section, which was 2.4 km (1.5 mi) long, was put into operation on 1 October 1913. This section was, however, temporarily shut down again between August 1914 and August 1915, because the road had to be modified to cater for the new loads. On 1 November 1916, the 2.7 km (1.7 mi) long Magnedens (Es Bous)–Farvagny-le-Grand section was opened. At the Farvagny-le-Grand terminal, a second depot was provided. With the completion of this section, the maximum extent of the line was reached, because the planned branch to Sainte-Apolline was never built.

=== Decline ===
As a result of economic difficulties after World War I, an extension of the system to Bulle could no longer be pursued. In addition, the system's vehicles had defects, which were due mainly to the still not very advanced vehicle technology and the poor road conditions. The 1925 schedule included five pairs of trips over the entire route as well as an extra pair over the Fribourg–La Glâne section.

Following the electrification of the Lausanne–Bern railway by the SBB-CFF-FFS, the Romont–Bern catenary went into service on 15 May 1927, and the trolleybus overhead wires at the La Glâne railway crossing had to be dismantled. From then onwards, the electrical contact troller had to be exchanged, in a cumbersome procedure, every time a trolleybus used the level crossing; this task was carried out by an employee of the company's nearby depot. It was not until 1949 that an obstacle-free crossing would again have been possible – in that year, the level crossing was replaced by an overpass further to the east.

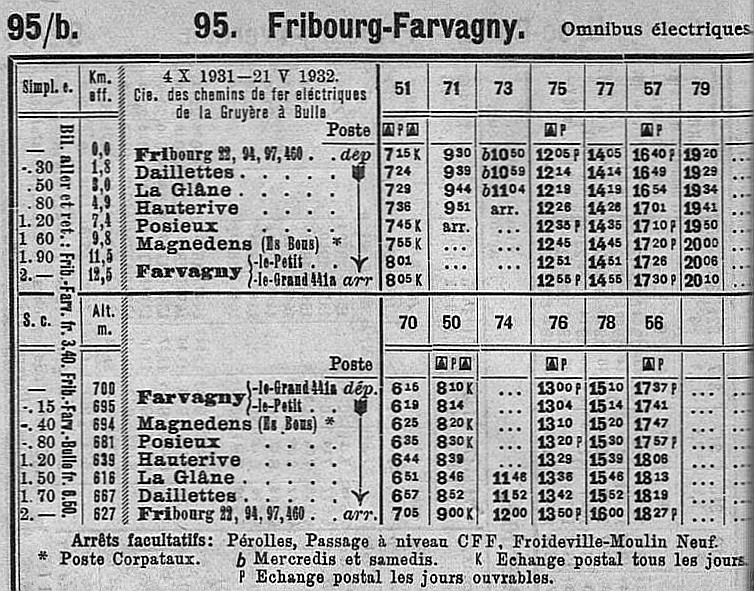
The final valid timetable. On individual trips, the carriage of mail is separately noted. At that time, a ride over the total system cost two Swiss francs.

Management of the system was ceded on 1 April 1929 to the Chemins de fer électriques de la Gruyère (CEG), which decided to continue operating the concession until the end of its term on 31 January 1932, but not to extend it. The reasons for this lay, on the one hand, in the desire to extend the line via Farvagny, and, on the other hand, in the slow and laborious procedures when trolleybuses were crossing in opposite directions, and at the railway level crossing.

On 21 May 1932, the last scheduled trolleybus service ran along the line. During the system's entire period of operation, a total of 1.5 million people were transported electrically. From the day following the system's closure, the CEG used only diesel buses, which could run continuously through to Bulle. The normal travel time of 50 minutes by trolleybus fell to just 30 minutes after the change to diesel buses. Today this route is served by regional bus line 336.

In the urban area of Fribourg, the Transports publics fribourgeois (TPF) has operated a modern trolleybus network, the Fribourg trolleybus system, since 1949.

== Infrastructure ==
Only a single pair of overhead wires was installed along the entire Fribourg–Farvagny route. This catenary arrangement consisted of two copper wires, 65 mm (2.6 in) in diameter, mounted 30 cm (12 in) apart. These wires were located at a height of 5.8 m (19 ft) above the roadway. The Mercedes-Électrique-Stoll design allowed for a lateral deviation of 6 m (20 ft) to 8 m (26 ft).

In La Glâne, and from 1916 also in Farvagny-le-Grand, was a depot with a converter station. The voltage used on the system was 550 volts DC.

The standard Mercédès-Électrique-Stoll system contact trollers ran along the wires. They were connected by a cable to the vehicle. Under this arrangement, the vehicles could therefore operate in both directions without the provision of turning loops. When two vehicles travelling in opposite directions needed to cross, the contact trollers were exchanged between the vehicles; the driver unplugged his vehicle and then plugged in the troller of the oncoming vehicle to continue his trip.

== Fleet ==
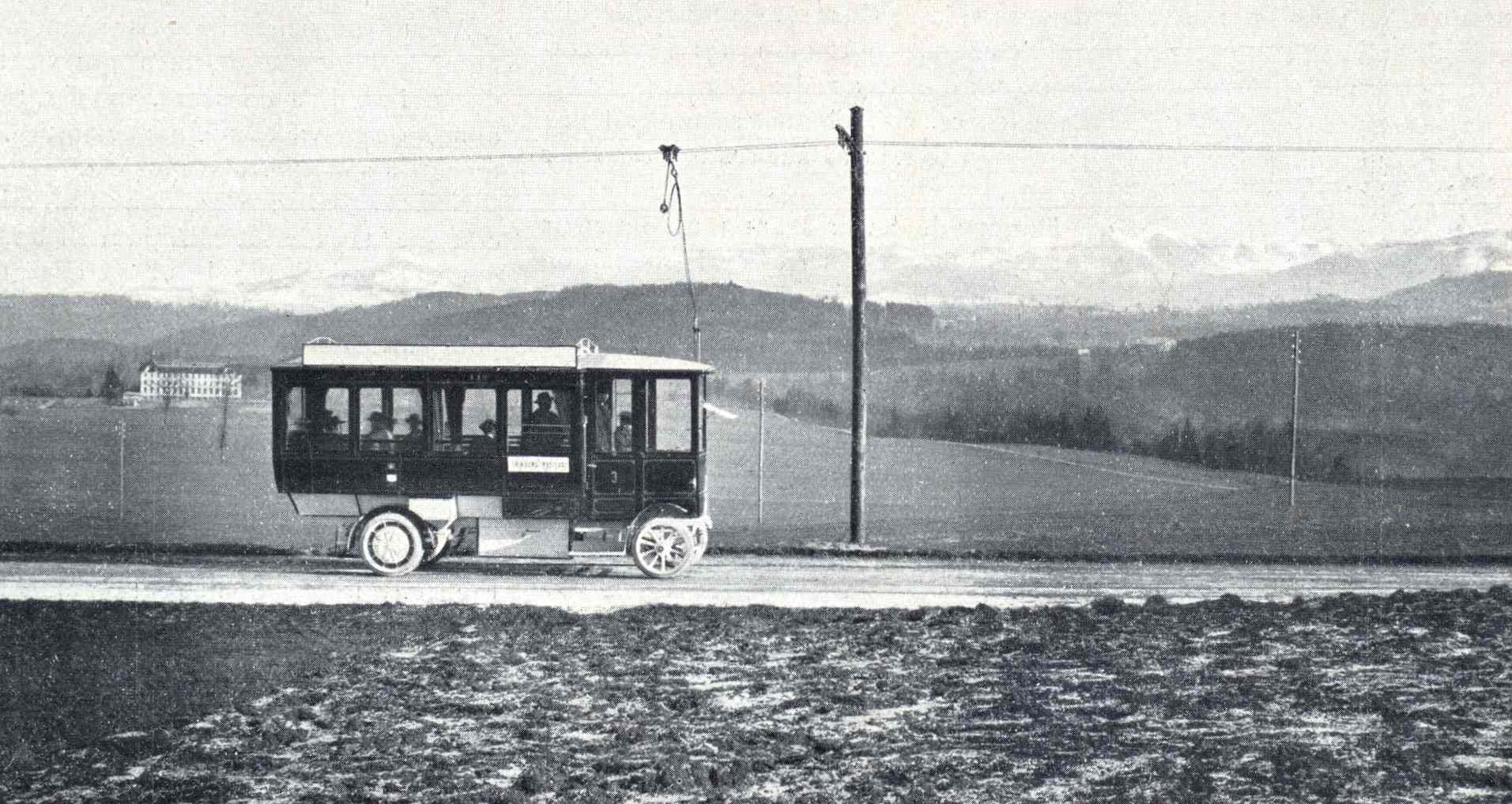
Trolleybus no. 3 on the open road.

Three passenger-carrying vehicles, with fleet numbers 1 to 3, and a trolleytruck, were acquired for use on the system. Along with the Gümmenen–Mühleberg trackless railway (1918–1922) – which was, however, an exclusively freight carrying operation – the Fribourg–Farvagny trolleybus system was one of only two trolleytruck operations in Switzerland. However, the trolleytruck was seldom used, due to the lack of a branch line.

The manufacturer of all of the vehicles, the Daimler-Motoren-Gesellschaft in Wiener Neustadt, Austria, fabricated the chassis and bodies, and installed the electrical equipment. All four vehicles were delivered in 1911. The trolleybuses offered seventeen seats and seven standing places. They initially had a top speed of 20 km/h (12 mph), weighed 3.2 t (3.1 long tons; 3.5 short tons) and were equipped with two wheel hub motors with a power output of 20 PS (15 kW).

The wheels of each vehicle were made of wood. The front wheels were fitted with single-layer solid rubber tyres, and the rear wheels had double layered tyres. The two hub motors were very vulnerable, partly due to the vehicles' lack of suspension, and partly because they were not fully enclosed like their present-day equivalents. These weaknesses led to breakdowns, as the roads were still unpaved dirt roads, causing the motors to suffer from dust exposure. For these reasons, the three trolleybuses were rebuilt between 1917 and 1920. The rebuilding work was carried out by Tribelhorn in Feldbach, and included the installation of new engines. After the rebuilds, the vehicles' top speed was 25 km/h (16 mph). The weight of cars 1 and 2 was increased to 3.6 t (3.5 long tons; 4.0 short tons), and car 3 to 4.47 t (4.40 long tons; 4.93 short tons).

The vehicles were painted in a dark red livery, with part of the undercarriage picked out in yellow.

So that the passenger-carrying operation could be sustained, a Saurer motorbus of type 32 R was procured in 1917. After the closure of the system in 1932, all vehicles were sold to individual purchasers, and over time all were scrapped.

== See also ==
- List of trolleybus systems in Switzerland
