= List of airports in Switzerland =

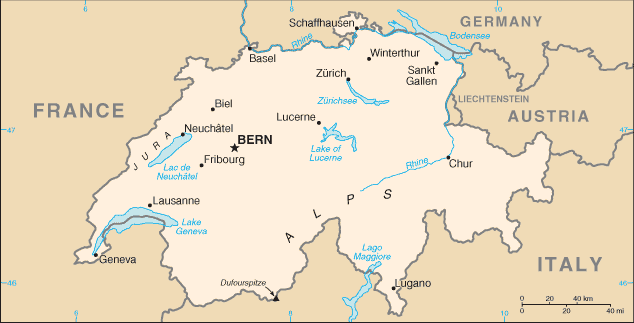
Map of Switzerland

This is a list of airports in Switzerland, sorted by location.

== Airports ==
Airport names shown in bold have scheduled passenger service on commercial airlines.

City served / Location	Canton	ICAO	IATA	Airport name	Passengers (2019)	Total aircraft movements (2024)
Public airports						
Ambri / Piotta	Ticino	LSPM		Ambri Airport		1,233
Basel, Switzerland / Mulhouse, France / Freiburg, Germany	Basel (Haut-Rhin (F), Freiburg (D))	LFSB	BSL, MLH, EAP	**EuroAirport Basel Mulhouse Freiburg**	9,090,312	
Bern / Belp	Bern	LSZB	BRN	**Bern Airport** (Bern-Belp Airport)	151,621	44,362
Bex	Vaud	LSGB		Bex Airport		9,625
Birr / Lupfig	Aargau	LSZF		Birrfeld Airport		50,403
Ecuvillens (de, fr)	Fribourg	LSGE		Fribourg-Ecuvillens Airfield		18,997
Buochs (de, fr)	Nidwalden	LSZC	BXO	Buochs Airport		10,521
Geneva	Geneva	LSGG	GVA	**Geneva Airport** (Geneva–Cointrin Airport)	17,677,045	179,106
Glarus	Glarus	LSZM		Mollis Airfield		19,643
Gruyère	Fribourg	LSGT		Gruyère Airport		10,762
Grenchen	Solothurn	LSZG		Grenchen Airport		56,692
Interlaken / Matten	Bern	LSMI		Interlaken Airport		3,277
La Chaux-de-Fonds	Neuchâtel	LSGC		Les Eplatures Airport		6,701
Prangins	Vaud	LSGP		La Côte Airfield		3,080
Lausanne / Blécherette (de, fr)	Vaud	LSGL		Lausanne Airport (Lausanne–La Blécherette Airport)		31,137
Locarno	Ticino	LSZL		Locarno Airport		50,707
Lugano / Agno	Ticino	LSZA	LUG	**Lugano Airport** (Lugano–Agno Airport)	190,698	20,835
Colombier, Neuchâtel	Neuchâtel	LSGN		Neuchâtel Airport		11,896
Saanen / Gstaad	Bern	LSGK		Saanen Airport		8,952
Sion (Sitten)	Valais	LSGS	SIR	**Sion Airport** (Public / Military: 14th Air Base)	32,798	43,145
St. Gallen / Altenrhein (fr)	St. Gallen	LSZR	ACH	**St. Gallen-Altenrhein Airport**	145,000	26,451
St. Moritz / Samedan	Graubünden	LSZS	SMV	Samedan Airport (Engadine Airport)		17,891
St. Stephan	Bern	LSTS		St. Stephan Airport		863
Yverdon-les-Bains	Vaud	LSGY		Yverdon Airfield		19,328
Zürich / Kloten	Zürich	LSZH	ZRH	**Zurich Airport** (Zürich–Kloten Airport)	31,538,236	261,104

== See also ==
- List of the busiest airports in Switzerland
- Swiss Air Force
- Transport in Switzerland
- List of airports by ICAO code: L#LS – Switzerland and Liechtenstein
- Wikipedia: WikiProject Aviation/Airline destination lists: Europe#Switzerland
