= Compagnie des omnibus électriques Fribourg–Farvagny =

- Company type: Joint-stock company
- Industry: Public transport
- Founded: 7 August 1911
- Defunct: circa 1930
- Successor: Chemins de fer électriques de la Gruyère (CEG)
- Headquarters: Bulle, Switzerland
- Area served: Canton of Fribourg
- Services: Fribourg–Farvagny trolleybus system

The Compagnie des omnibus électriques Fribourg–Farvagny SA (sometimes abbreviated as F–F, and occasionally also described as Compagnie des omnibus électriques Fribourg–Posieux–Farvagny SA) was a joint-stock company based in Bulle, Switzerland.

== History ==
The company was founded on 7 August 1911, and from 4 January 1912 was the operator of the Fribourg–Farvagny trolleybus system, an early interurban trolleybus line in the canton of Fribourg, Switzerland. Its share capital amounted to 450,000 Swiss francs, half provided by the canton of Fribourg and the other half by the communities adjacent to Bulle.

As a result of World War I, the company ran into financial difficulties, and on 1 April 1929 therefore ceded the management of the trolleybus line to the Chemins de fer électriques de la Gruyère (CEG). The CEG eventually bought the company on 30 June 1930 for 85,000 Swiss francs and continued to operate the trolleybus system up until its closure in 1932.

== See also ==
- List of trolleybus systems in Switzerland
- Trolleybuses in Fribourg
