= Chemin de fer Châtel-St-Denis-Bulle-Montbovon =

Railway line in Switzerland

The Chemin de fer Châtel-St-Denis-Bulle-Montbovon (CBM) planned a metre-gauge railway between the towns in its title. The line was constructed and opened in four stages: from Châtel-Saint-Denis to Vuadens, then to Bulle, then to La Tour-de-Trême and to Montbovon in 1904. At Châtel-St-Denis it formed an end-on junction with the Chemin de fer Châtel-St-Denis-Palézieux. Before the first part opened the company was renamed Chemins de fer électriques de la Gruyère.
