= Magnedens =

Former municipality, canton of Fribourg

- Former municipality
- Aerial view (2021)
- Location of Magnedens
- Location within Switzerland Location within Canton of Fribourg
- Coordinates: 46.7422°N 7.0813°E
- Country: Switzerland
- Canton: Fribourg
- District: Sarine
- Municipality: Gibloux

Population (1990)
  - Total: 90
- Time zone: UTC+01:00 (CET)
  - Summer (DST): UTC+02:00 (CEST)
- ISO 3166 code: CH-FR
- Website

Magnedens (former German name Magnedingen) is a village and former municipality in the Sarine district of the canton of Fribourg, Switzerland. From 1999 to 2015 it formed the municipality of Corpataux-Magnedens together with Corpataux; since 2016 it has been part of the new municipality of Gibloux. It lies on the left bank of the Sarine, 10 kilometres (6.2 mi) southwest of Fribourg.

== History ==
Magnedens is first mentioned in 1156 as Manoldens and in 1229 as Magnoudeins. There is a burial mound (tumulus) at La Taillat. In 1143 Magnedens belonged to the lordship of Arconciel, which Bern and Fribourg conquered in 1475. The Order of Saint John possibly had a commandery in Magnedens as early as 1156, and in any case before 1173; it was dissolved in 1229 and taken over by the commandery of Fribourg. The nearby Hauterive monastery also held property in Magnedens.

Magnedens came to the bailiwick of Illens in 1484, belonged to the district of Fribourg from 1798 to 1847 and was assigned to the Sarine district in 1848. Magnedens, which has no church of its own, formerly belonged to the parish of Ecuvillens; since 1907 it has formed a parish together with Corpataux. Cooperation with Corpataux began as early as 1954 for the water supply and sewerage, and from 1962 for schooling. The A12 motorway passes near the village; the village has kept its farming character.

Magnedens had 82 inhabitants in 1811, 85 in 1850, 101 in 1900, 105 in 1950 and 90 in 1990. In 1990, 80% of the inhabitants had French and 17% German as their mother tongue.

== Bibliography ==
- J. Gumy, Regeste de l'abbaye de Hauterive, de l'ordre de Cîteaux, 1923
- Jahrbuch der Schweizerischen Gesellschaft für Ur- und Frühgeschichte, 64, 1981, p. 234
- E. Tremp (ed.), Liber donationum Altaeripae, 1984
- Freiburger Nachrichten, 22 July 1991
