= Fribourg-Ecuvillens Airfield =

Airport in Ecuvillens, Switzerland

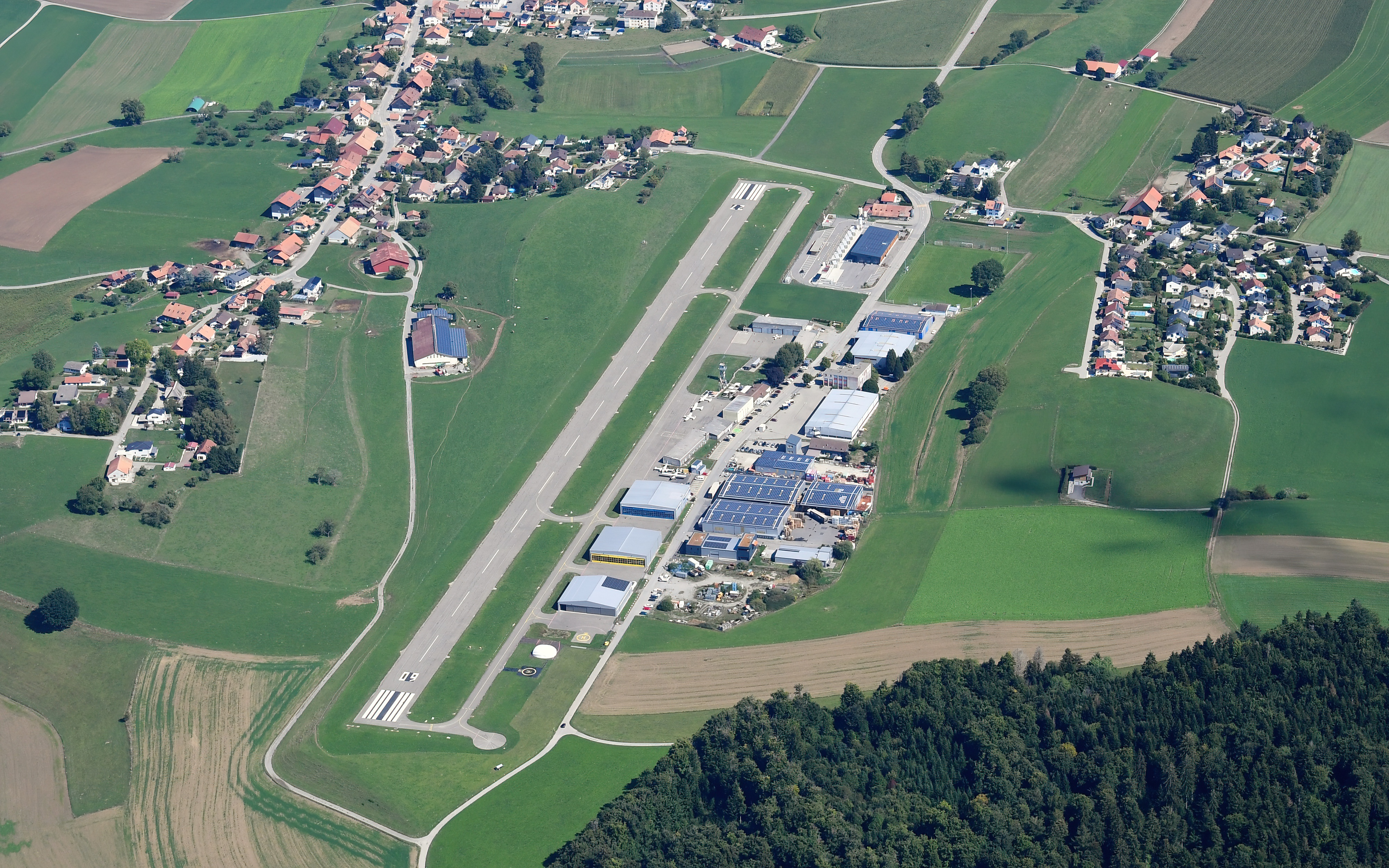
- Fribourg-Ecuvillens Airfield from above
- IATA: none; ICAO: LSGE

Summary
- Airport type: Public
- Owner/Operator: Aérodrome Régional de Fribourg-Ecuvillens SA (AREF)
- Serves: Fribourg
- Time zone: UTC+1 ()
- Elevation AMSL: 2,293 ft (699 m)
- Coordinates: 46°45′30″N 007°4′57″E
- Website: www.aerodrome-ecuvillens.ch
- Interactive map of Fribourg-Ecuvillens Airfield

Runways
Direction	Length		Surface
Direction	ft	m	Surface
09/27	2,625	800	Asphalt

Fribourg-Ecuvillens Airfield (ICAO: LSGE) is an airport in the village of Ecuvillens, Switzerland, part of the municipality of Hauterive. It serves the nearby city of Fribourg. It is a public airfield open to all private and commercial aircraft, though it has no regular, scheduled passenger traffic.

Located southwest of Fribourg, the airfield is close to the A12 motorway. It has an east-west runway (27/09), a mechanical workshop, an electronics workshop, and about sixty parking spaces for aircraft. It also hosts a skydiving club.

== History ==
In 1989, a flight school, Air Fribourg Services SA, was founded.

In 1997, the Swiss Department of Transport, Communications and Energy, which managed the aerodrome, handed ownership of the airfield facilities to the company Aérodrome régional Fribourg-Ecuvillens SA.

The airfield hosted what one Swiss aviation magazine deemed the world's first flight of a fully electric-powered aircraft, in August 2020.
