= Posieux =

Former municipality, canton of Fribourg

- Former municipality
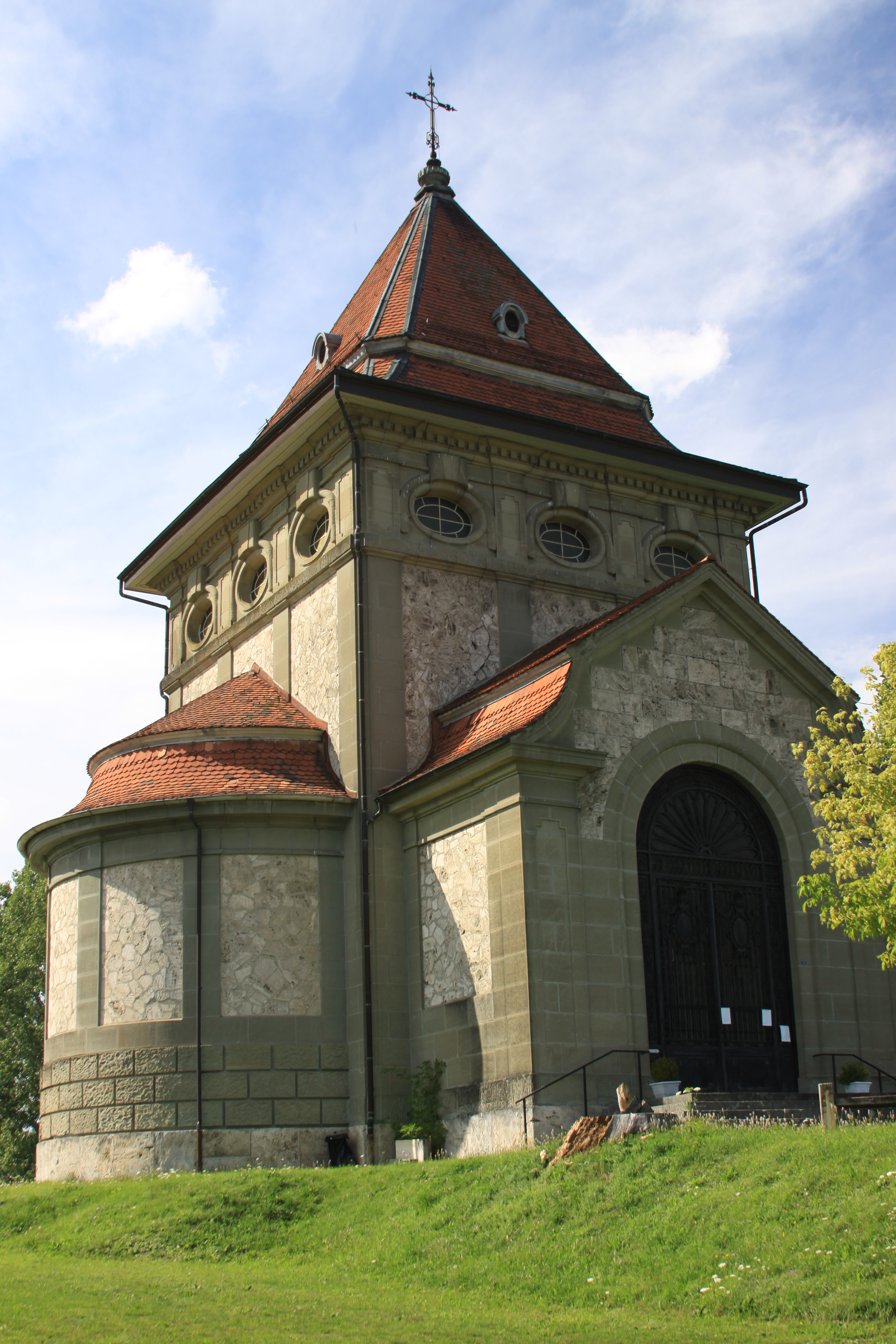
- Chapel of the Sacred Heart
- Location of Posieux
- Location within Switzerland Location within Canton of Fribourg
- Coordinates: 46.7622°N 7.0980°E
- Country: Switzerland
- Canton: Fribourg
- District: Sarine
- Municipality: Hauterive

Population (2000)
  - Total: 936
- Time zone: UTC+01:00 (CET)
  - Summer (DST): UTC+02:00 (CEST)
- SFOS number: 2219
- ISO 3166 code: CH-FR
- Website

Posieux is a former municipality in the Sarine district of the canton of Fribourg, Switzerland. In 2001 it merged with Ecuvillens to form the municipality of Hauterive. Its territory included Hauterive Abbey and Grangeneuve.

== History ==
Posieux is first mentioned in 1155 as Posuos. Châtillon-sur-Glâne is an important Celtic fortified site. In Roman times the Glâne may have been crossed by a ford at Sainte-Apolline; the present bridge there is not older than the 16th century.

Hauterive Abbey, founded in 1138, gradually extended its jurisdiction over Posieux. In 1319 the abbey of Payerne gave Hauterive the village and territory of Posieux, with its revenues, quitrents (cens) and forests, in exchange for other property. Posieux was part of the Old Lands (Anciennes Terres), in the banner (bannière) of the Neuveville, from 1442 at the latest, and of the district of Fribourg from 1798 to 1848. It received municipal regulations in 1690.

In 1781 the conspirators of the Chenaux uprising assembled at Posieux. Some 15,000 people of Fribourg opposed to the radical regime did the same in 1852; the chapel of the Sacred Heart (1911–1924) commemorates this event. In church matters Posieux belonged to the parish of Matran until 1590 and then to that of Ecuvillens. The chapel of Sainte-Apolline, first mentioned in 1147, was rebuilt in 1566 after a fire; its interior was restored in 1943. The chapel of Les Muëses was built in 1672.

An electric omnibus ran between Fribourg, Posieux and Farvagny from 1912 to 1932. The opening of the A12 motorway (1981–1982) helped turn Posieux, formerly agricultural, into a residential village. The company Zbinden Posieux SA, which makes road trailers, dates from 1946. Because of the institutions at Grangeneuve (the agricultural school and the federal research station Agroscope), the service sector dominates: in 2000, 477 people commuted to work in Posieux, holding 95% of its jobs.

Posieux had 162 inhabitants in 1811, 199 in 1850, 362 in 1900, 600 in 1950 and 936 in 2000.

== Bibliography ==
- Entre Glâne et Sarine, 1986
- G. Bourgarel, "Pont et chapelle de Sainte-Apolline", in Archéologie fribourgeoise: chronique archéologique, 1989/1992, pp. 149–154
- J. Chassot, Compagnie des omnibus électriques Fribourg-Posieux-Farvagny (F-F) 1912–1932, 2000
- V. Clerc, L'Assemblée de Posieux, 2002
