= Ecuvillens =

Former municipality, canton of Fribourg

- Former municipality
- Coat of arms
- Location of Ecuvillens
- Location within Switzerland Location within Canton of Fribourg
- Coordinates: 46.7570°N 7.0815°E
- Country: Switzerland
- Canton: Fribourg
- District: Sarine
- Municipality: Hauterive

Population (2000)
  - Total: 710
- Time zone: UTC+01:00 (CET)
  - Summer (DST): UTC+02:00 (CEST)
- SFOS number: 2188
- ISO 3166 code: CH-FR
- Website

Ecuvillens (former German name Cüvellingen) is a former municipality in the Sarine district of the canton of Fribourg, Switzerland. Since 2001 it has been part of the municipality of Hauterive, together with Grangeneuve and Posieux.

== History ==
Ecuvillens is first mentioned in 1137 as Escuvilens. There are traces of a castle (11th–12th century) at the place called La Vuerda, a rocky peninsula overlooking the Glâne; it is thought to have been the seat of the lords of Glâne, who are recorded in the 11th and 12th centuries. From the foundation of Hauterive Abbey in 1138, the family of the knights of Ecuvillens gradually bequeathed its lands, tithes and quitrents (cens) to the abbey.

Ecuvillens was part of the Old Lands (Anciennes Terres) from 1452 and of the district of Fribourg from 1798 to 1848. The law code in force was the Municipale of Fribourg. The parish, mentioned in 1138, includes Posieux; Corpataux and Magnedens separated from it in 1907. The church, dedicated to the Virgin Mary, was given to Hauterive in 1142 by Guy de Maligny, bishop of Lausanne, and the abbey held its advowson until 1848. The church was rebuilt in 1809–1811 and again in 1911–1912.

Agriculture consists of livestock farming and cereal crops. An airfield was established in 1949 and a flying club in 1953. The La Tuffière gravel pit dates from 1964 and the A12 motorway from 1981.

Ecuvillens had 295 inhabitants in 1811, 443 in 1850, 523 in 1900, 600 in 1930, 563 in 1950, 448 in 1960 and 710 in 2000.

== Bibliography ==
- A. Dellion, Dictionnaire historique et statistique des paroisses catholiques du canton de Fribourg, vols. 5–6, pp. 29–45
- B. de Vevey, Châteaux et maisons fortes du canton de Fribourg, 1978, pp. 103–104
- M. Francey, "Les châteaux de Glâne", in Memento (Société de développement d'Ecuvillens-Posieux), 22, 1982; 23, 1983; 25, 1984
