= Corpataux =

Former municipality, canton of Fribourg

- Former municipality
- Corpataux in 1943
- Location of Corpataux
- Location within Switzerland Location within Canton of Fribourg
- Coordinates: 46.7452°N 7.0988°E
- Country: Switzerland
- Canton: Fribourg
- District: Sarine
- Municipality: Gibloux

Population (1990)
  - Total: 514
- Time zone: UTC+01:00 (CET)
  - Summer (DST): UTC+02:00 (CEST)
- ISO 3166 code: CH-FR
- Website

Corpataux is a village and former municipality in the Sarine district of the canton of Fribourg, Switzerland. From 1999 to 2015 it formed the municipality of Corpataux-Magnedens together with Magnedens; since 2016 it has been part of the new municipality of Gibloux. It lies on the left bank of the Sarine, and its territory included the hamlet of La Tuffière.

== History ==
Corpataux is first mentioned in the 12th century as Corpastur or Corpastor. There are remains from the La Tène period (a grave with a Helvetian gold coin), from the Roman period (a villa of the 1st century AD) and from the early Middle Ages (slab graves). Corpataux was part of the lordship of Arconciel-Illens until Fribourg conquered it in 1475. It then belonged to the bailiwick of Illens until 1798, and to the district of Farvagny from 1798 to 1848.

The chapel of Corpataux was a chapel of ease of the parish of Ecuvillens. Since 1907 Corpataux has formed a parish with Magnedens; its neo-Gothic church of Saint John the Baptist was consecrated in 1912.

Fulling mills are recorded at La Tuffière from the 12th century; they stopped working before 1940. Until the 20th century the hamlet was also known for its tufa quarry. The building of the bridge (a suspension bridge in 1836; the present structure is of concrete) improved communications with the right bank of the Sarine. A timber business was followed around 1950 by a fish farm and a construction company, and after 1960 by a factory making cement elements and a gravel pit. The opening of the A12 motorway sped up the diversification of the economy at the expense of the primary sector, and Corpataux is becoming a residential village.

Corpataux had 232 inhabitants in 1811, 321 in 1850, 336 in 1900, 404 in 1950, 359 in 1960 and 514 in 1990.

== Bibliography ==
- Annuaire statistique du canton de Fribourg, 1971–1993

=== Archives ===
- Card index (Fichier), State Archives of Fribourg (Archives de l'État de Fribourg)
