= Chemins de fer électriques de la Gruyère =

Swiss railway company

The Chemins de fer électriques de la Gruyère (CEG) was a Swiss railway company in the Canton of Fribourg which operated between 1903 and 1942. Its name finally adopted by the Chemin de fer Châtel-St-Denis-Bulle-Montbovon (CBM) before operation started (the 1903 federal rolling stock statistics already showed the company as CEG). In 1907 it was enlarged by the amalgamation of the Chemin de fer Châtel-St-Denis-Palézieux (CP). To this system, a short branch from Bulle to Broc was added which opened in 1912.

The company operated a system of just 48.2 km with a main line from Montbovon, the junction with the Montreux–Lenk im Simmental line, to Palézieux, on the SBB-CFF-FFS line between Bern and Lausanne. The Broc branch made up the total distance.

Two standard gauge operations joined in a further amalgamation on 1 January 1942 when together they formed the Chemins de fer Fribourgeois Gruyère-Fribourg-Morat.

Between 1929 and 1932, the CEG also operated the Fribourg–Farvagny trolleybus system, an early trolleybus operation, which was taken over from the Compagnie des omnibus électriques Fribourg–Farvagny, before the whole company merged into the CEG in 1930.

== Sources ==
Grandguillaume Michel, et al., Voies étroites de Veveyse et de Gruyère. BVA, Lausanne, 1984, ISBN 2-88125-003-3
