= Corpataux-Magnedens =

- Former municipality
- Coat of arms
- Location of Corpataux-Magnedens
- Location within Switzerland Location within Canton of Fribourg
- Coordinates: 46°45′N 7°6′E
- Country: Switzerland
- Canton: Fribourg
- District: Sarine

Government
  - Mayor: Syndic

Area
  - Total: 4.47 km^{2} (1.73 sq mi)
- Elevation: 687 m (2,254 ft)

Population (December 2020)
  - Total: 1,313
  - Density: 294/km^{2} (761/sq mi)
- Time zone: UTC+01:00 (CET)
  - Summer (DST): UTC+02:00 (CEST)
- Postal code: 1727
- SFOS number: 2184
- ISO 3166 code: CH-FR
- Surrounded by: Arconciel, Farvagny, Hauterive, Rossens
- Website: commune-gibloux.ch

Corpataux-Magnedens is a former municipality in the district of Sarine in the canton of Fribourg in Switzerland. The francophone municipality was formed 1 January 1999, from the union of Corpataux (French: [kɔʁpato]; Arpitan: Corpathâlx [kɔʁpaˈθɑ]) and Magnedens (French: [maɲədɑ̃s], Franco-Provençal: [maɲəˈdɛ̃]). On 1 January 2016, it merged with Farvagny, Le Glèbe, Rossens and Vuisternens-en-Ogoz to form the new municipality of Gibloux.

== Geography ==
Corpataux-Magnedens had an area, as of 2009, of 4.4 square kilometers (1.7 mi^{2}). Of this area, 2.49 km^{2} (0.96 mi^{2}) or 57.0% is used for agricultural purposes, while 1.06 km^{2} (0.41 mi^{2}) or 24.3% is forested. Of the rest of the land, 0.81 km^{2} (0.31 mi^{2}) or 18.5% is settled (buildings or roads), 0.11 km^{2} (27 acres) or 2.5% is either rivers or lakes.

Of the built-up area, housing and buildings comprised 7.6% and transportation infrastructure made up 3.9%. Power and water infrastructure as well as other special developed areas made up 6.2% of the area Out of the forested land, all of the forested land area is covered with heavy forests. Of the agricultural land, 42.8% is used for growing crops and 13.3% is pastures. All the water in the municipality is flowing water.

The former municipality is located in the Sarine district.

== Coat of arms ==
The blazon of the municipal coat of arms is Gules a Saltire in chief a Maltese Cross and in base a Ram all Argent.

== Demographics ==
Corpataux-Magnedens had a population (as of 2014) of 1,296. As of 2008, 9.9% of the population are resident foreign nationals. During the period 2000–2010, the population changed at a rate of 44.2%. Migration accounted for 32.9%, while births and deaths accounted for 9.8%.

Most of the population (as of 2000) speaks French (738 or 92.0%) as their first language, German is the second most common (45 or 5.6%) and Italian is the third (7 or 0.9%). There are 2 people who speak Romansh.

As of 2008, the population was 51.9% male and 48.1% female. The population was made up of 523 Swiss men (46.3% of the population) and 63 (5.6%) non-Swiss men. There were 487 Swiss women (43.1%) and 56 (5.0%) non-Swiss women. Of the population in the municipality, 286 or about 35.7% were born in Corpataux-Magnedens and lived there in 2000. There were 344 or 42.9% who were born in the same canton, while 77 or 9.6% were born somewhere else in Switzerland, and 65 or 8.1% were born outside of Switzerland.

As of 2000, children and teenagers (0–19 years old) make up 26.8% of the population, while adults (20–64 years old) make up 64% and seniors (over 64 years old) make up 9.2%.

As of 2000, there were 345 people who were single and never married in the municipality. There were 404 married individuals, 38 widows or widowers and 15 individuals who are divorced.

As of 2000, there were 287 private households in the municipality, and an average of 2.8 persons per household. There were 52 households that consist of only one person and 30 households with five or more people. In 2000, a total of 276 apartments (93.9% of the total) were permanently occupied, while 12 apartments (4.1%) were seasonally occupied and 6 apartments (2.0%) were empty. As of 2009, the construction rate of new housing units was 7.8 new units per 1000 residents. The vacancy rate for the municipality, in 2010, was 1.42%.

The historical population is given in the following chart:

== Politics ==
In the 2011 federal election, the most popular party was the SPS which received 36.7% of the vote. The next three most popular parties were the SVP (16.8%), the CVP (15.1%) and the FDP (7.2%).

The SPS received about the same percentage of the vote as they did in the 2007 Federal election (36.0% in 2007 vs 36.7% in 2011). The SVP moved from third in 2007 (with 17.0%) to second in 2011, the CVP moved from second in 2007 (with 19.2%) to third and the FDP moved from below fourth place in 2007 to fourth. A total of 358 votes were cast in this election, of which 8 or 2.2% were invalid.

== Economy ==
As of 2010, Corpataux-Magnedens had an unemployment rate of 3.9%. As of 2008, there were 26 people employed in the primary economic sector and about 10 businesses involved in this sector. 20 people were employed in the secondary sector and there were 6 businesses in this sector. 39 people were employed in the tertiary sector, with 14 businesses in this sector. There were 424 residents of the municipality who were employed in some capacity, of which females made up 40.8% of the workforce.

In 2008 the total number of full-time equivalent jobs was 68. The number of jobs in the primary sector was 20, all of which were in agriculture. The number of jobs in the secondary sector was 20 of which 16 or (80.0%) were in manufacturing and 4 (20.0%) were in construction. The number of jobs in the tertiary sector was 28. In the tertiary sector; 2 or 7.1% were in the movement and storage of goods, 3 or 10.7% were in a hotel or restaurant, 4 or 14.3% were technical professionals or scientists, 7 or 25.0% were in education.

In 2000, there were 24 workers who commuted into the municipality and 356 workers who commuted away. The municipality is a net exporter of workers, with about 14.8 workers leaving the municipality for every one entering. Of the working population, 8.3% used public transportation to get to work, and 77.6% used a private car.

== Religion ==
From the 2000 census, 646 or 80.5% were Roman Catholic, while 44 or 5.5% belonged to the Swiss Reformed Church. Of the rest of the population, there were 8 members of an Orthodox church (or about 1.00% of the population), there were 4 individuals (or about 0.50% of the population) who belonged to the Christian Catholic Church, and there were 18 individuals (or about 2.24% of the population) who belonged to another Christian church. There were 5 (or about 0.62% of the population) who were Islamic. 30 (or about 3.74% of the population) belonged to no church, are agnostic or atheist, and 56 individuals (or about 6.98% of the population) did not answer the question.

== Education ==
In Corpataux-Magnedens about 267 or (33.3%) of the population have completed non-mandatory upper secondary education, and 105 or (13.1%) have completed additional higher education (either university or a Fachhochschule). Of the 105 who completed tertiary schooling, 62.9% were Swiss men, 29.5% were Swiss women, 4.8% were non-Swiss men.

The Canton of Fribourg school system provides one year of non-obligatory Kindergarten, followed by six years of Primary school. This is followed by three years of obligatory lower Secondary school where the students are separated according to ability and aptitude. Following the lower Secondary students may attend a three or four year optional upper Secondary school. The upper Secondary school is divided into gymnasium (university preparatory) and vocational programs. After they finish the upper Secondary program, students may choose to attend a Tertiary school or continue their apprenticeship.

During the 2010–11 school year, there were a total of 118 students attending 6 classes in Corpataux-Magnedens. A total of 268 students from the municipality attended any school, either in the municipality or outside of it. There was one kindergarten class with a total of 18 students in the municipality. The municipality had 5 primary classes and 100 students. During the same year, there were no lower secondary classes in the municipality, but 46 students attended lower secondary school in a neighboring municipality. There were no upper Secondary classes or vocational classes, but there were 25 upper Secondary students and 41 upper Secondary vocational students who attended classes in another municipality. The municipality had no non-university Tertiary classes, but there was one non-university Tertiary student and 4 specialized Tertiary students who attended classes in another municipality.

As of 2000, there were 6 students in Corpataux-Magnedens who came from another municipality, while 79 residents attended schools outside the municipality.
