= Hauterive, Fribourg =

Hauterive
- Municipality
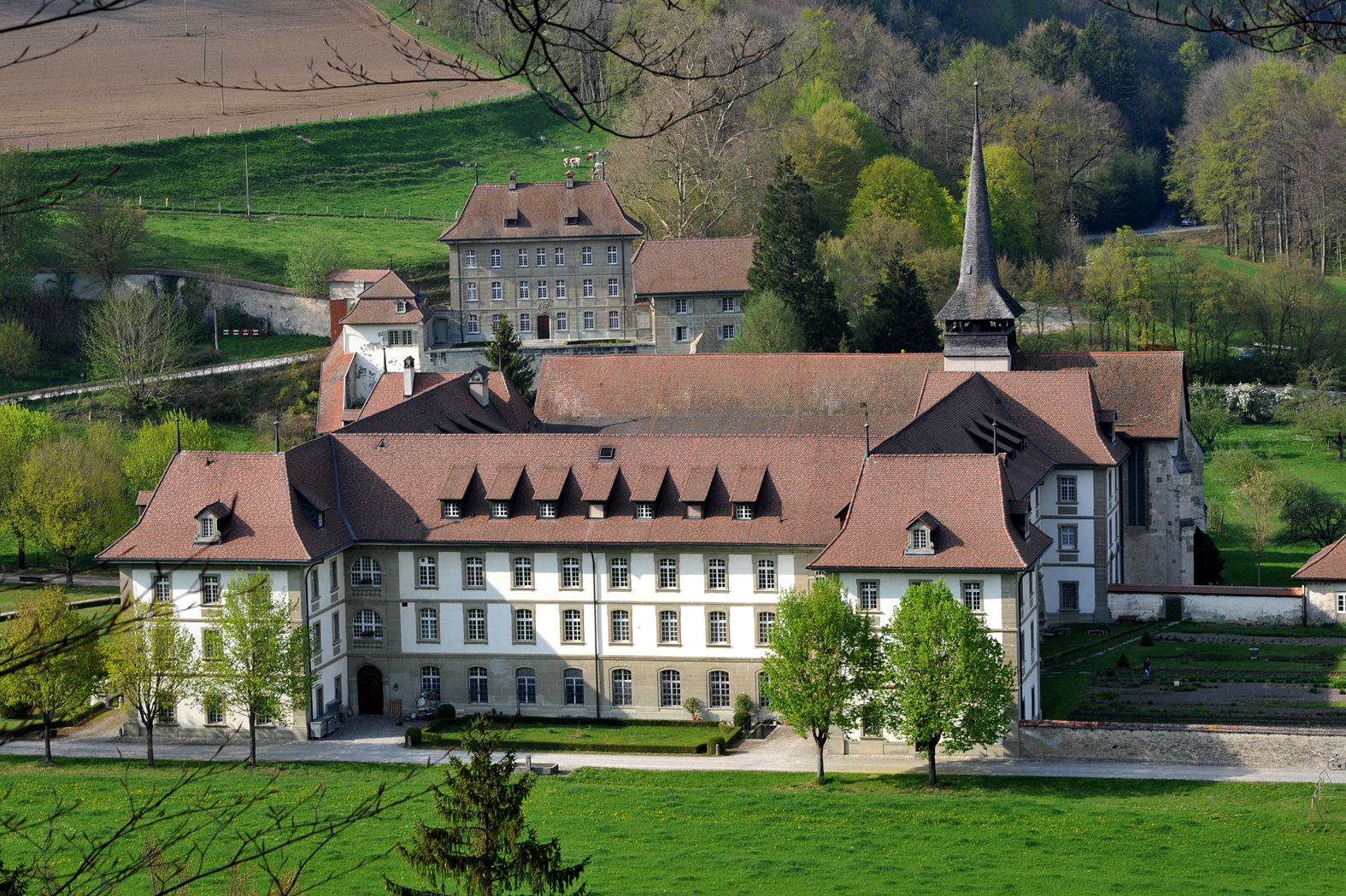
- View of the southern side of the Abbey of Hauterive

- Coat of arms
- Location of Hauterive
- Location within Switzerland Location within Canton of Fribourg
- Coordinates: 46°46′N 7°7′E
- Country: Switzerland
- Canton: Fribourg
- District: Sarine

Government
  - Mayor: Syndic

Area
  - Total: 11.92 km^{2} (4.60 sq mi)
- Elevation: 680 m (2,230 ft)

Population (December 2020)
  - Total: 2,597
  - Density: 217.9/km^{2} (564.3/sq mi)
- Time zone: UTC+01:00 (CET)
  - Summer (DST): UTC+02:00 (CEST)
- Postal codes: 1725 Posieux; 1730 Ecuvillens
- SFOS number: 2233
- ISO 3166 code: CH-FR
- Surrounded by: Arconciel, Corpataux-Magnedens, Cottens, Farvagny, Marly, Matran, Neyruz, Villars-sur-Glâne
- Website: hauterivefr.ch

Hauterive (French pronunciation: [otʁiv]; Arpitan: Hôtariva) is a municipality in the district of Sarine in the canton of Fribourg in Switzerland. It was created from the union in 2001 of the villages of Posieux (French: [pɔzjø]; Arpitan: Posiôls [pɔˈʒy]) and Ecuvillens (French: [ekyvijɑ̃s]; Arpitan: Ecuvilyens [ekyviˈjɛ̃]).

== History ==
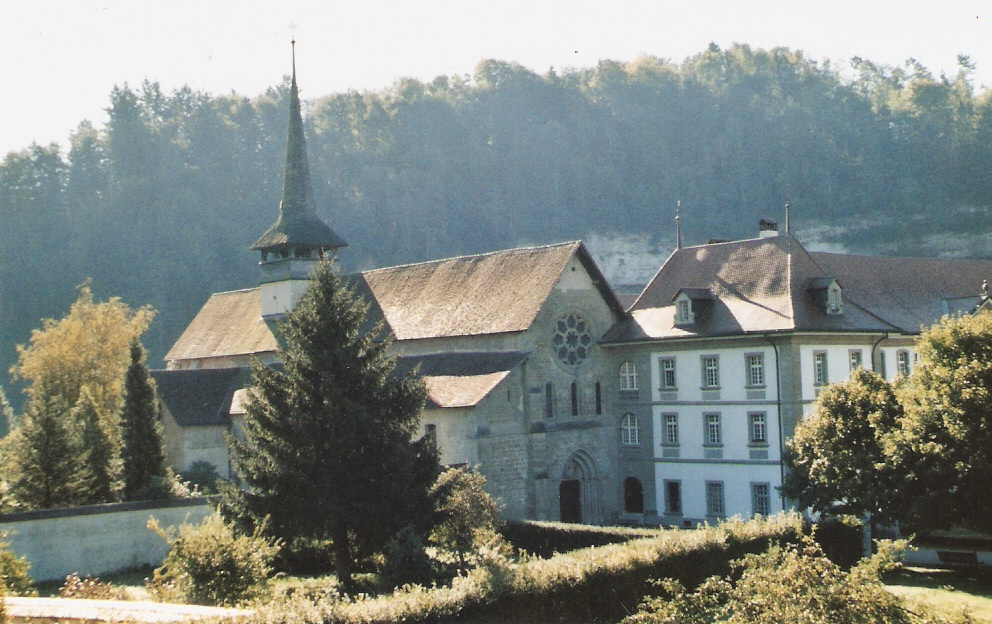
Abbey Hauterive

Its Cistercian abbey was founded in 1138, closing its doors in 1848 following the Sonderbund War, but was to reopen in 1939.

== Geography ==
Hauterive has an area, as of 2009, of 11.9 square kilometers (4.6 mi^{2}). Of this area, 6.26 km^{2} (2.42 mi^{2}) or 52.4% is used for agricultural purposes, while 3.6 km^{2} (1.4 mi^{2}) or 30.2% is forested. Of the rest of the land, 1.86 km^{2} (0.72 mi^{2}) or 15.6% is settled (buildings or roads), 0.19 km^{2} (0.073 mi^{2}) or 1.6% is either rivers or lakes and 0.01 km^{2} (2.5 acres) or 0.1% is unproductive land.

Of the built up area, industrial buildings made up 1.3% of the total area while housing and buildings made up 5.2% and transportation infrastructure made up 5.6%. Power and water infrastructure as well as other special developed areas made up 3.1% of the area Out of the forested land, all of the forested land area is covered with heavy forests. Of the agricultural land, 34.6% is used for growing crops and 17.3% is pastures. All the water in the municipality is flowing water.

It consists of the villages of Ecuvillens and Posieux as well as the hamlet of Grangeneuve.

== Coat of arms ==
The blazon of the municipal coat of arms is Pally of seven Argent and Azure overall a Lion rampant Or langued armed and viriled Gules holding a Crosslet of the first. The current coat of arms combines the blue and white stripes from Ecuvillens and the lion and one cross from Posieux.

== Demographics ==
Hauterive has a population (as of December 2020) of 2,597. As of 2008, 10.5% of the population are resident foreign nationals. Over the last 10 years (2000–2010) the population has changed at a rate of 36.9%. Migration accounted for 27.1%, while births and deaths accounted for 8.8%.

Most of the population (as of 2000) speaks French (86.5%) as their first language, German is the second most common (9.8%) and Italian is the third (1.0%).

As of 2008, the population was 51.3% male and 48.7% female. The population was made up of 981 Swiss men (45.4% of the population) and 127 (5.9%) non-Swiss men. There were 942 Swiss women (43.6%) and 111 (5.1%) non-Swiss women. As of 2000, children and teenagers (0–19 years old) make up 27.2% of the population, while adults (20–64 years old) make up 62.2% and seniors (over 64 years old) make up 10.6%.

As of 2009, the construction rate of new housing units was 13.5 new units per 1000 residents. The vacancy rate for the municipality, in 2010, was 0.47%.

== Heritage sites of national significance ==
The Cistercian Abbey of Hauterive, the Chapel votive du Sacré-Coeur, the Châtillon-sur-Glâne, the Pont (bridge) de la Glâne (shared with Villars-sur-Glâne) and the bridge and chapel of Sainte-Apolline (shared with Villars-sur-Glâne) are listed as Swiss heritage site of national significance. The entire Hauterive area is part of the Inventory of Swiss Heritage Sites.

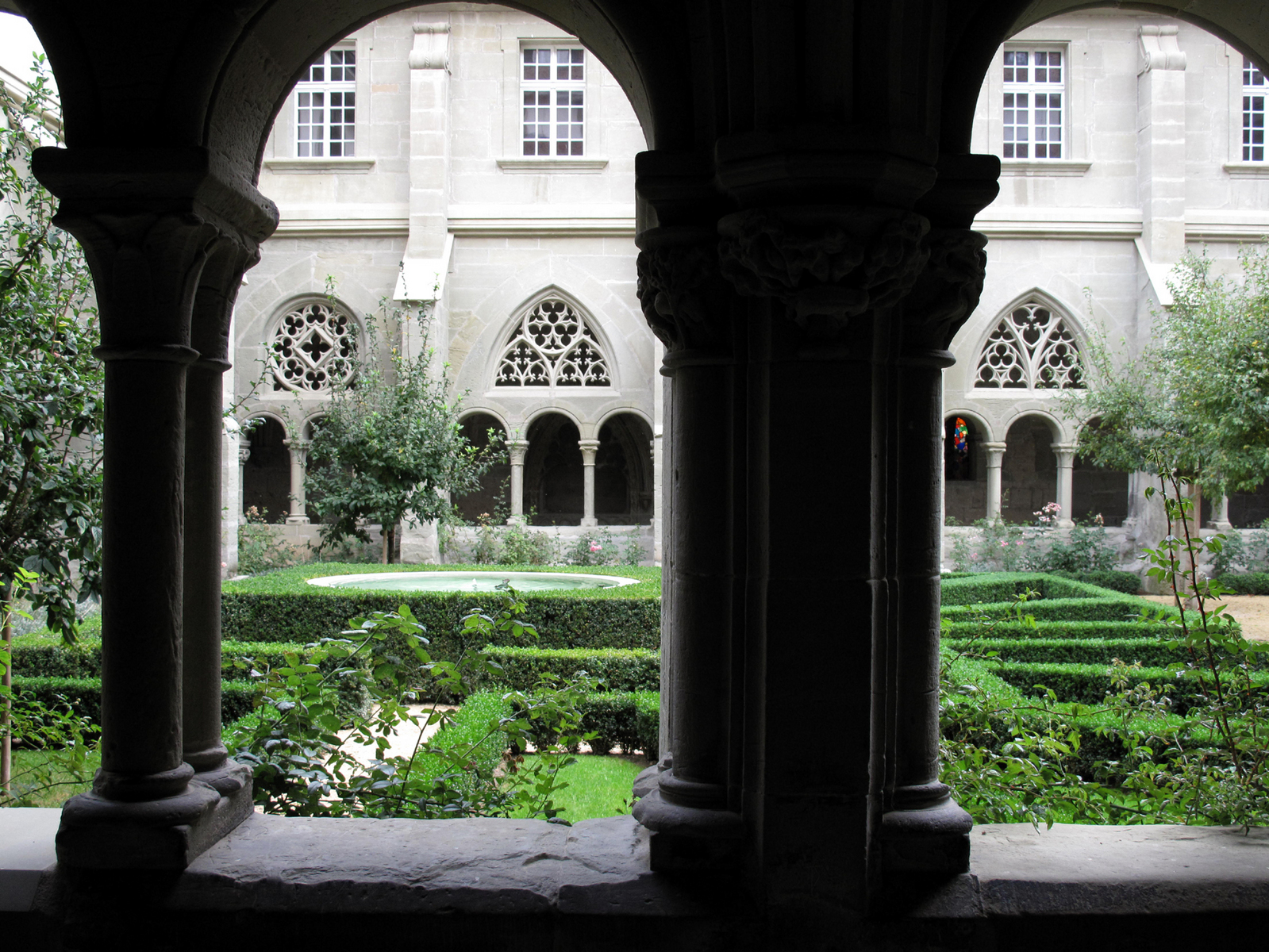
Cloister of Hauterive Abbey

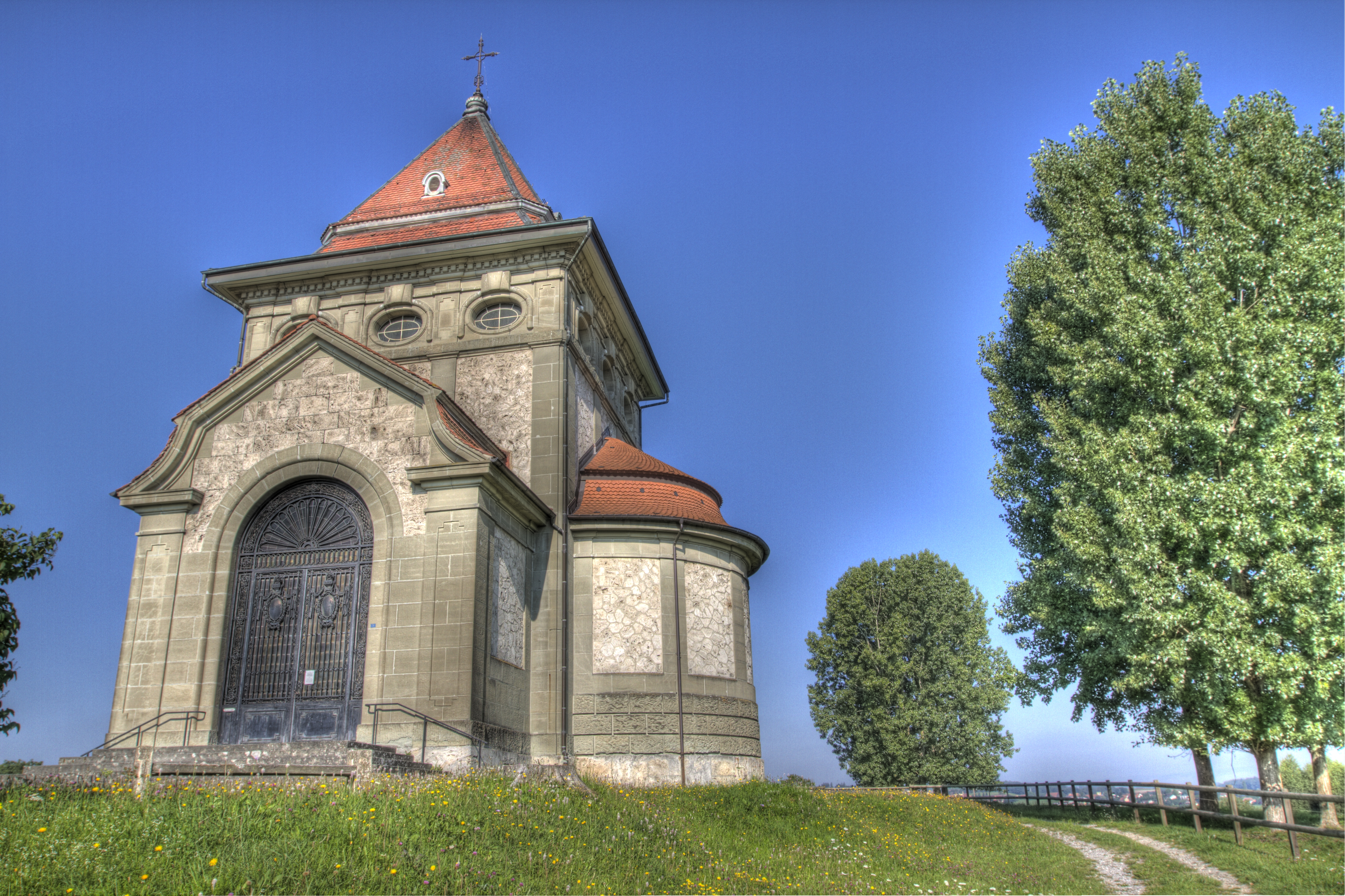
Chapel du Sacré-Coeur

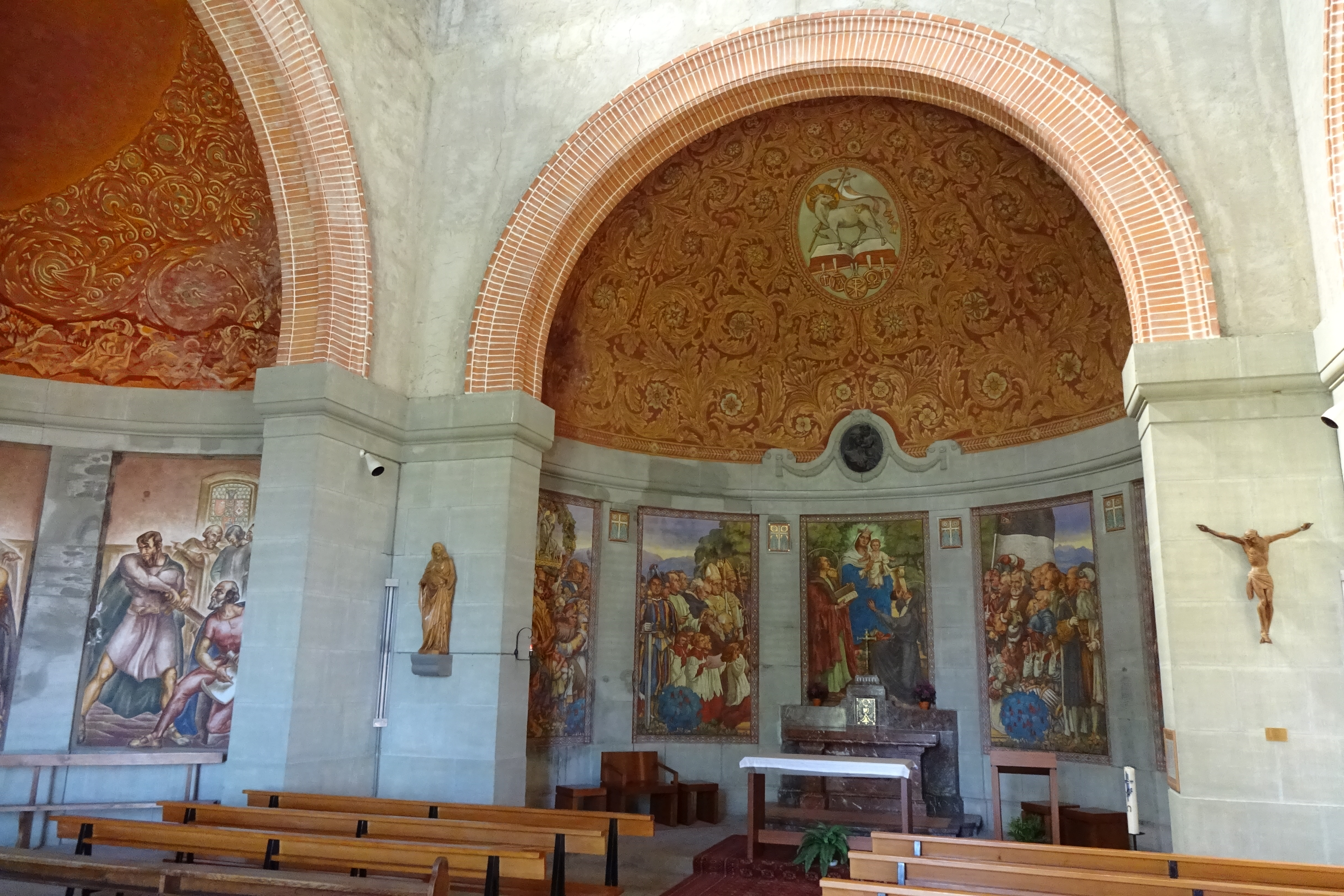
Chapel in Sacré-Cœur de Jésus by Alphonse Andrey, 1911-1924

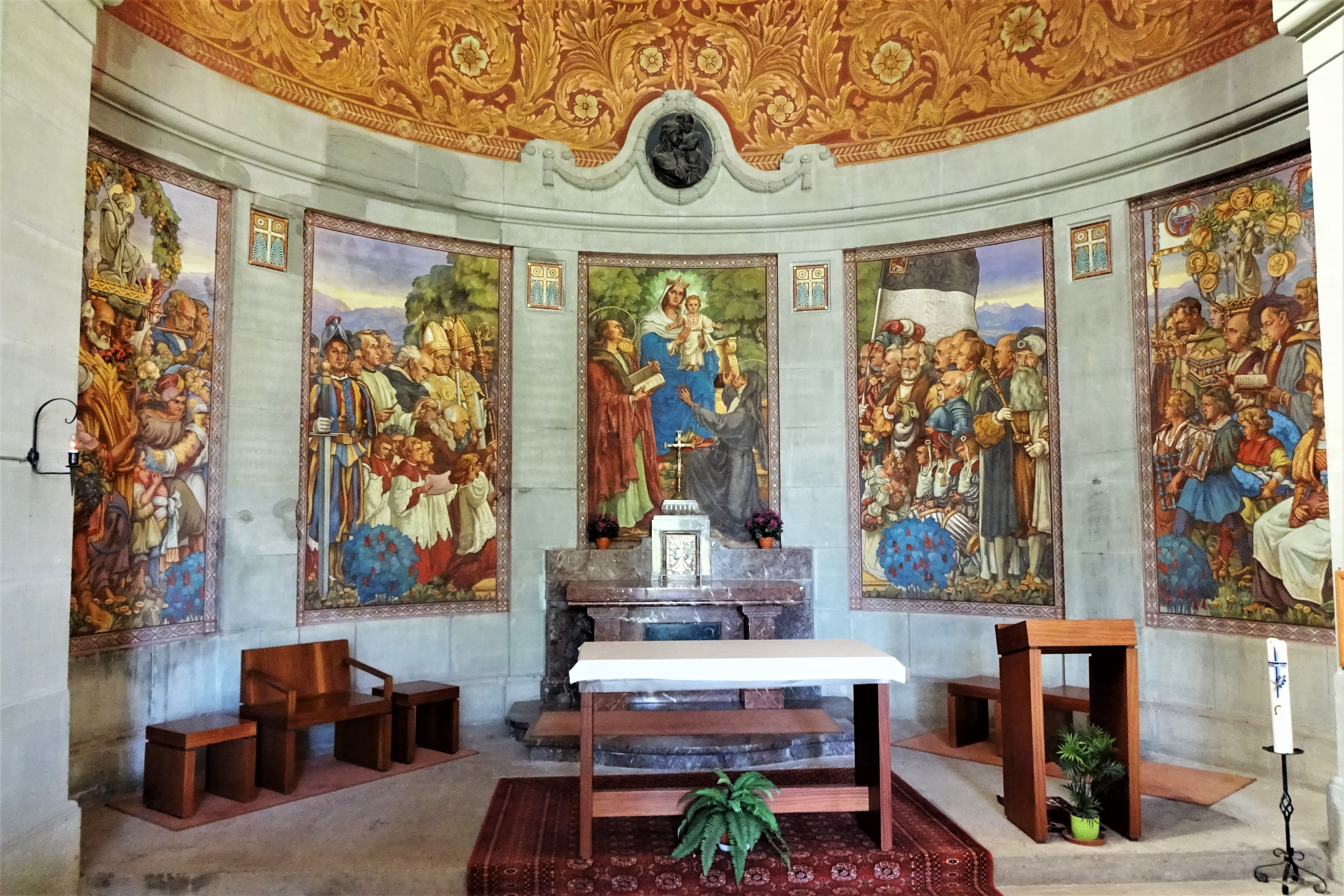
Chapel in Sacré-Cœur de Jésus, by Alphonse Andrey, 1911-1924

== Politics ==
In the 2011 federal election the most popular party was the SPS which received 32.9% of the vote. The next three most popular parties were the CVP (20.6%), the SVP (18.6%) and the FDP (9.4%).

The SPS received about the same percentage of the vote as they did in the 2007 Federal election (29.2% in 2007 vs 32.9% in 2011). The CVP lost popularity (26.0% in 2007), the SVP retained about the same popularity (19.7% in 2007) and the FDP retained about the same popularity (8.9% in 2007). A total of 694 votes were cast in this election, of which 10 or 1.4% were invalid.

== Economy ==
As of 2010, Hauterive had an unemployment rate of 2.8%. As of 2008, there were 69 people employed in the primary economic sector and about 18 businesses involved in this sector. 215 people were employed in the secondary sector and there were 26 businesses in this sector. 658 people were employed in the tertiary sector, with 53 businesses in this sector. There were residents of the municipality who were employed in some capacity.

In 2008 the total number of full-time equivalent jobs was 806. The number of jobs in the primary sector was 57, of which 53 were in agriculture and 4 were in forestry or lumber production. The number of jobs in the secondary sector was 207 of which 93 or (44.9%) were in manufacturing, 28 or (13.5%) were in mining and 26 (12.6%) were in construction. The number of jobs in the tertiary sector was 542. In the tertiary sector; 47 or 8.7% were in wholesale or retail sales or the repair of motor vehicles, 14 or 2.6% were in the movement and storage of goods, 38 or 7.0% were in a hotel or restaurant, 143 or 26.4% were technical professionals or scientists, 233 or 43.0% were in education and 4 or 0.7% were in health care.

Of the working population, 11.6% used public transportation to get to work, and 66.9% used a private car.

== Education ==
The Canton of Fribourg school system provides one year of non-obligatory Kindergarten, followed by six years of Primary school. This is followed by three years of obligatory lower Secondary school where the students are separated according to ability and aptitude. Following the lower Secondary students may attend a three or four year optional upper Secondary school. The upper Secondary school is divided into gymnasium (university preparatory) and vocational programs. After they finish the upper Secondary program, students may choose to attend a Tertiary school or continue their apprenticeship.

During the 2010–11 school year, there were a total of 1,592 students attending 131 classes in Hauterive. A total of 416 students from the municipality attended any school, either in the municipality or outside of it. There were 2 kindergarten classes with a total of 31 students in the municipality. The municipality had 9 primary classes and 189 students. During the same year, there were no lower secondary classes in the municipality, but 87 students attended lower secondary school in a neighboring municipality. There were 107 vocational upper Secondary classes, with 1,201 vocational upper Secondary students The municipality had 13 non-university Tertiary classes, with 171 non-university Tertiary students.
