= Tribelhorn =

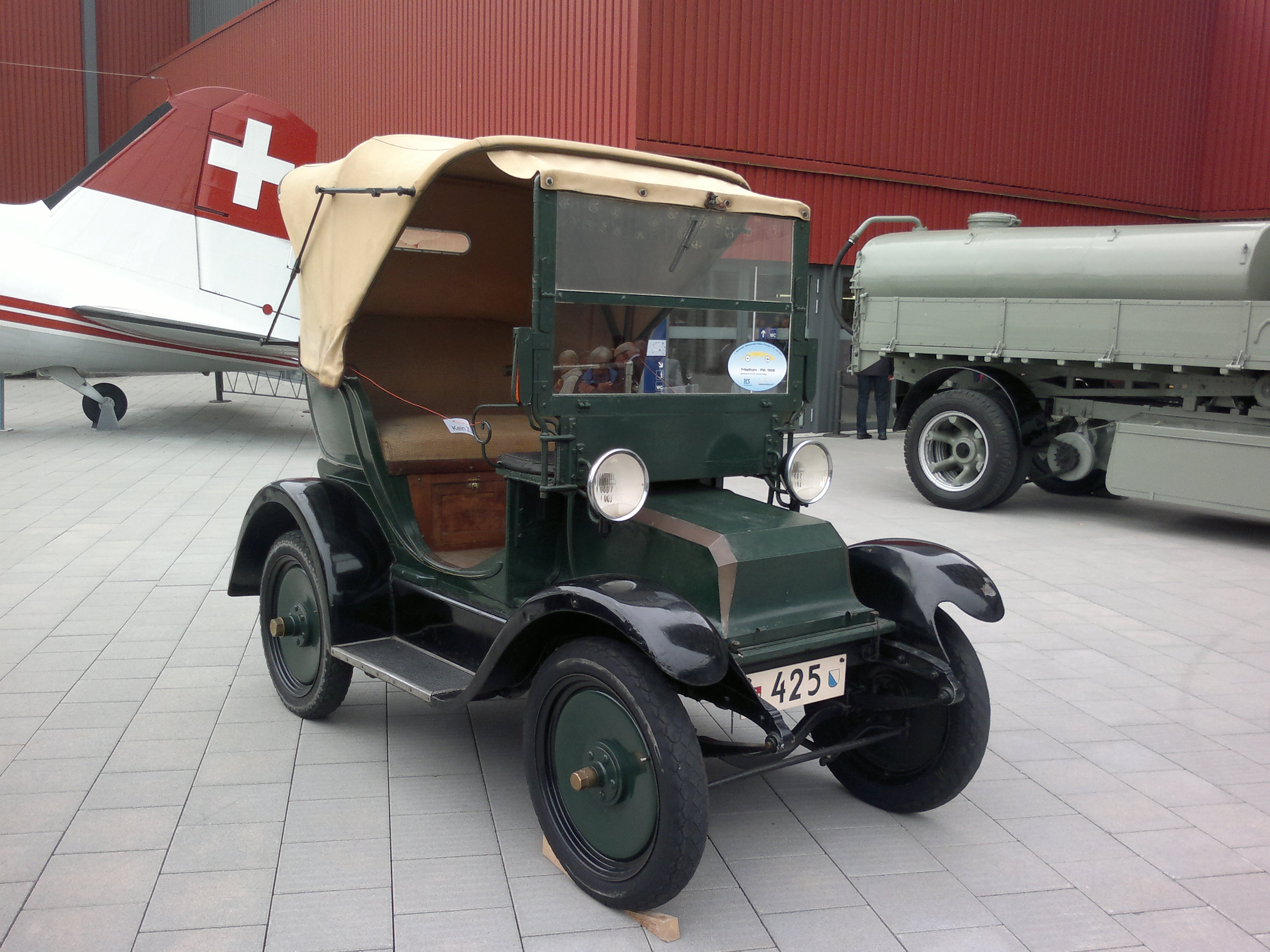
Tribelhorn Baujahr 1908

The Tribelhorn was a Swiss electric car manufactured in Zurich from 1899 to 1919, although production did not begin in earnest until 1902. The car was offered in both three- and four-wheeled versions. Additionally, the company produced trolleytrucks that were used in Gümmenen and Mühleberg, Switzerland, between 1918 and 1922 during the construction of a dam. After 1919, it focused solely on producing light utility vans.

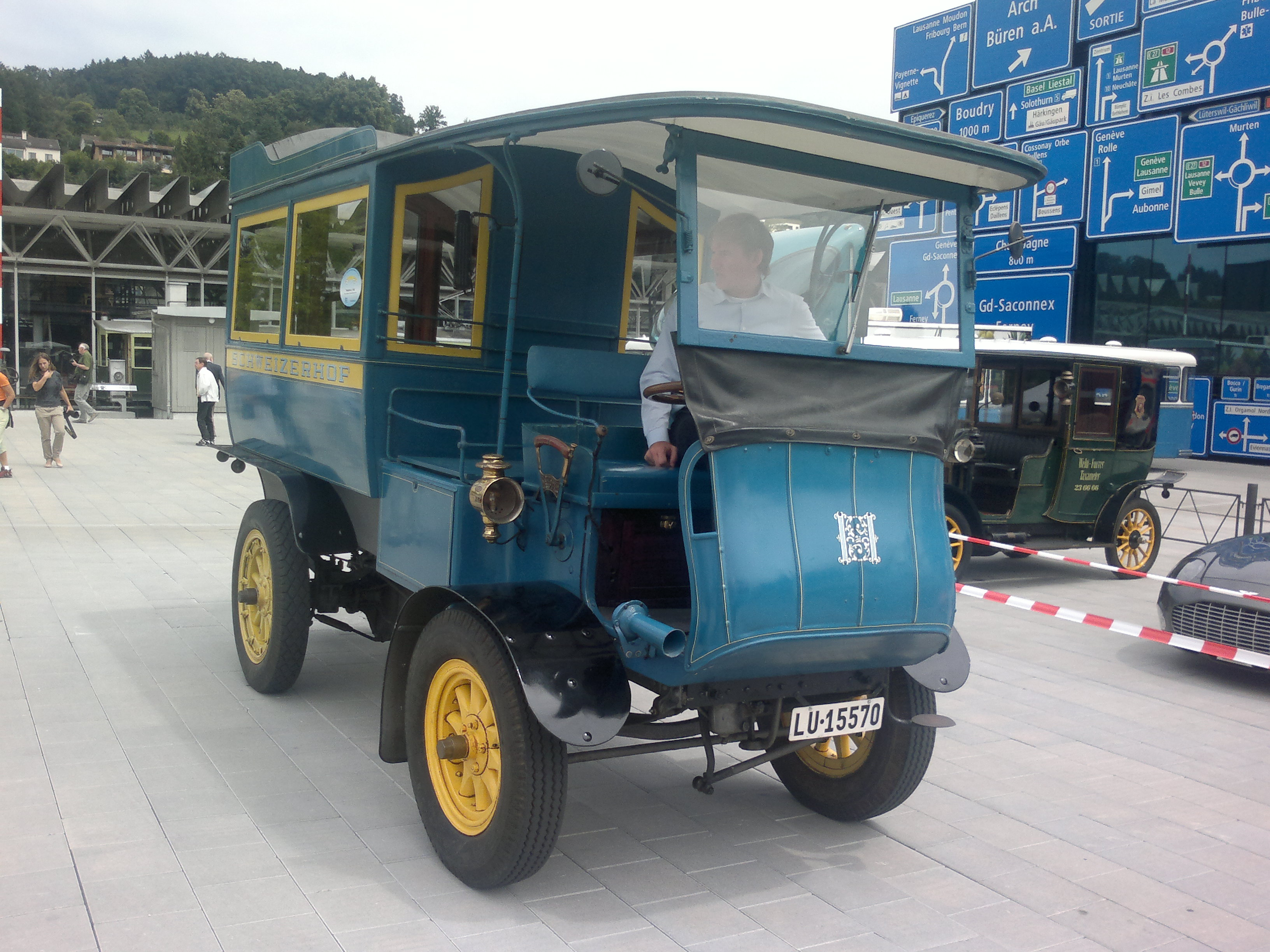
Tribelhorn 1912

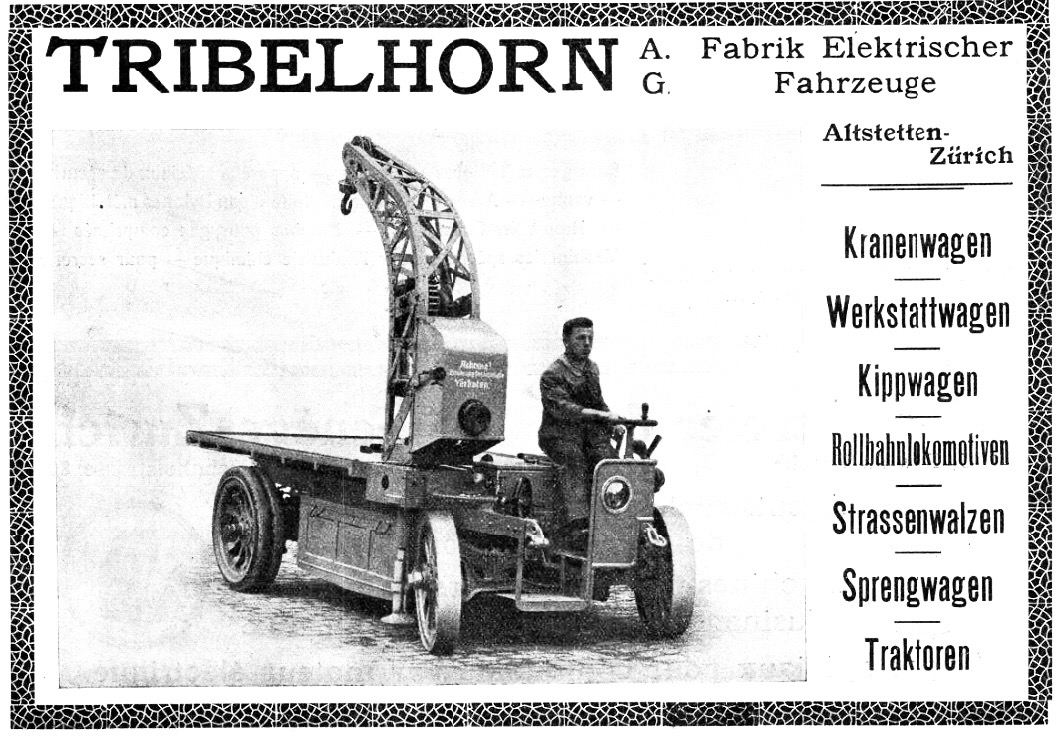
Tribelhorn crane truck (1919)

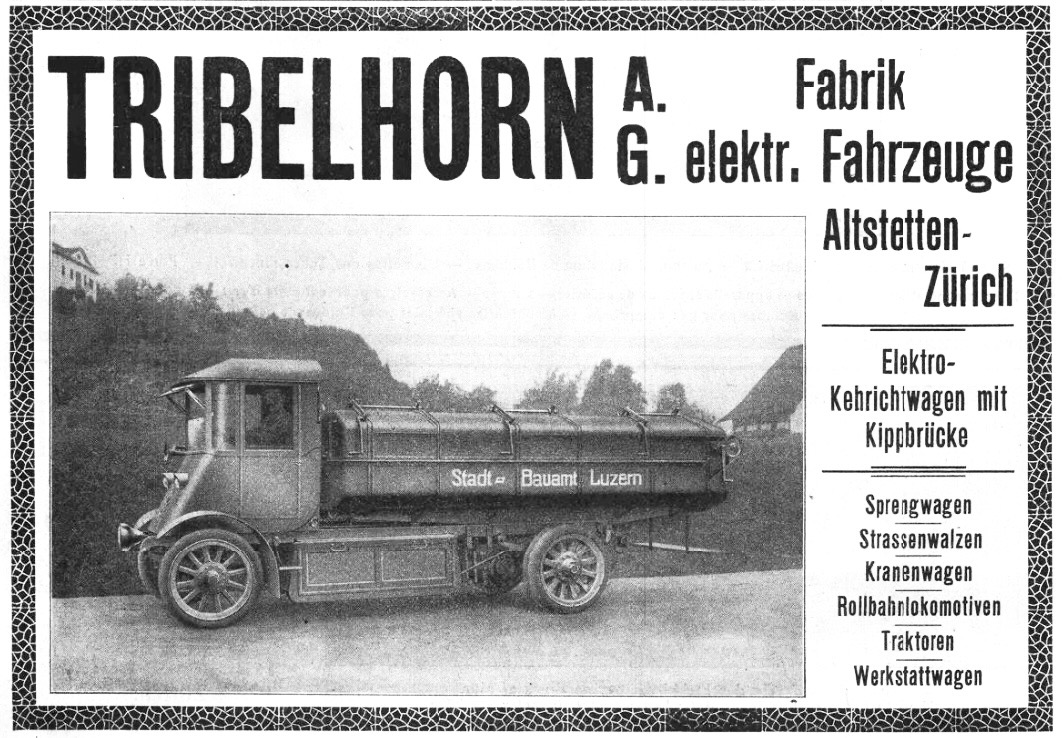
Tribelhorn Garbage Truck City of Lucerne (1919)

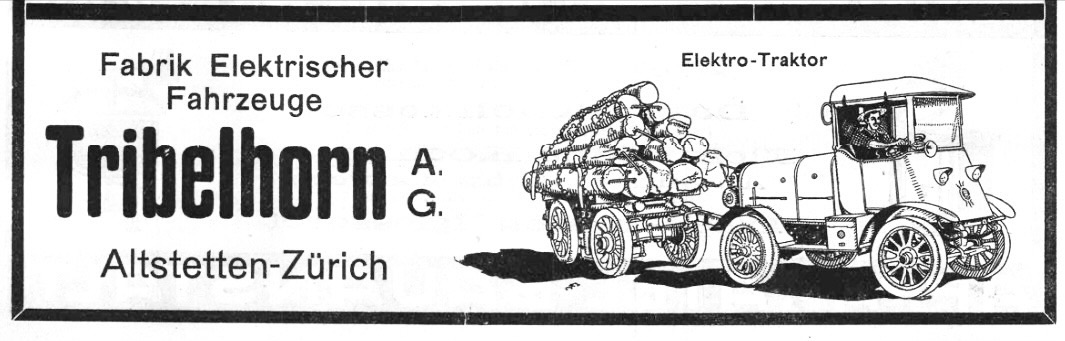
Tribelhorn Electro Tractor (1919)

== History ==
A. Tribelhorn & Cie. AG was founded in Feldbach, Switzerland, in 1902, initially focusing on manufacturing automobiles and trucks. In 1918, the company underwent a name change to Electrische Fahrzeuge AG and relocated to Altstetten in Zürich. Production of the Tribelhorn ceased in 1920.

== Vehicles ==
The first prototype of the Tribelhorn was developed in 1902, exclusively featuring an electric motor. The company primarily focused on manufacturing commercial vehicles, producing only small quantities of passenger vehicles.

The Tribelhorn received its patent in 1912. The vehicle enjoyed moderate popularity, with 78 vehicles registered in 1910, 121 in 1912, 121 in 1917, and 112 in 1918. In 1915, Tribelhorn also designed an electric wheelchair.

Currently, two Tribelhorn vehicles are exhibited at the Verkehrshaus der Schweiz (Swiss Museum of Transport) in Luzern.

Additionally, a conference room at Tesla Motors, Inc. is named after the company.

== Bibliography ==
- Harald H. Linz, Halwart Schrader: Die große Automobil-Enzyklopädie. BLV, München 1986, ISBN 3-405-12974-5. (in German)
- G.N. Georgano: Autos. Encyclopédie complète. 1885 à nos jours. Courtille, Paris 1975. (in French)
- Ernest Schmid: Schweizer Autos. Die schweizerischen Automobilkonstruktionen von 1868 bis heute. Auto-Jahr, Lausanne 1978, ISBN 2-88001-058-6. (in German)
- Martin Sigrist: Johann Albert Tribelhorn und sein Erbe bei EFAG und NEFAG – Pioniergeschichte des elektrischen Automobils. Verein für wirtschaftshistorische Studien, Zürich 2011, ISBN 978-3-909059-54-6 (Schweizer Pioniere der Wirtschaft und Technik. Bd. 93). (in German)
