= Chemin de fer Châtel-St-Denis–Palézieux =

Railway line in Switzerland

The Châtel-St-Denis–Palézieux railway (French: Chemin de fer Châtel-St-Denis–Palézieux, CP) was opened in 1901, a metre gauge railway running between the places in its title — Châtel-St-Denis and Palézieux-Gare. At Chatel-St-Denis it formed an end-on junction with the Châtel-St-Denis-Bulle-Montbovon line of the Chemins de fer électriques de la Gruyère, at that time still under construction, opened to Vuadens in 1903 and by 1904 completed through to Montbovon. In that same year also a line to Vevey by the Chemins de fer électriques Veveysans opened.

On 20 December 1907, after an independent existence of just six years, CP amalgamated with its neighbour Chemins de fer électriques de la Gruyère.

== Sources ==
Grandguillaume Michel, et al., Voies étroites de Veveyse et de Gruyère. BVA, Lausanne, 1984, ISBN 2-88125-003-3
