= Trolleybuses in Fribourg =

Public transport in Fribourg, Switzerland

Fribourg trolleybus system
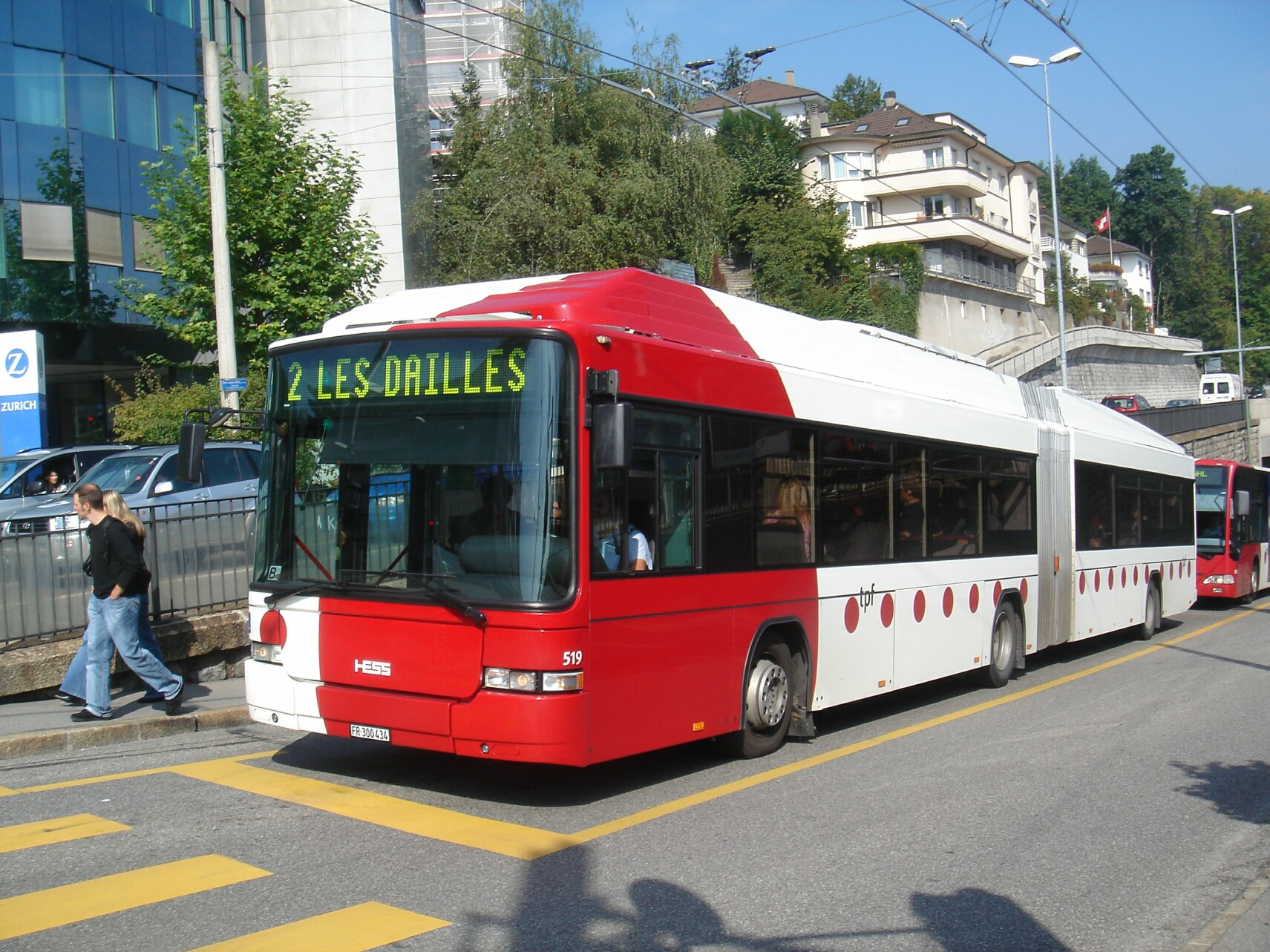
- Dual-mode bus 519 in service on line 2, 2006.

Operation
- Locale: Fribourg, Switzerland

Statistics
First era: 1912–1932
- Status: Closed
- Routes: 1
- Route length: 12.5 km (7.8 mi)
Current era: since 1949
- Status: Open
- Routes: 3
- Operator: Transports publics fribourgeois (TPF)
- Electrification: 600 V DC
- Website: https://www.tpf.ch/fr.html Transports publics fribourgeois (tpf) (in French)

The Fribourg trolleybus system (French: Réseau trolleybus de Fribourg) forms part of the public transport network in Fribourg, capital of the canton of Fribourg, Switzerland. The system also serves the neighbouring municipalities of Villars-sur-Glâne and Givisiez, using one line in each case.

== History ==
The current system is the second of two trolleybus systems to operate in Fribourg. The first opened on 4 January 1912 and connected the town with Farvagny. The solitary route, 12.5 km (7.8 mi) long, was largely rural, and the fleet comprised just three vehicles. It closed on 21 May 1932. It was the first trolleybus system in Switzerland and was the country's only such service for its entire 20-year existence. The Lausanne trolleybus system opened a few months after closure of the Fribourg–Farvagny line.

The second Fribourg trolleybus system opened on 31 January 1949 and gradually replaced the Fribourg tramway network, the last line of which closed on 31 March 1965.

The individual line sections of the Fribourg trolleybus system went into operation as follows:

31 January 1949	Jura Chassotte–St-Pierre–Gare-CFF (2.92 km)
15 May 1949	Tilleul–St-Pierre und Gare-CFF–Vignettaz-Daler
1 October 1959	Tilleul–Schoenberg Dunant
1 April 1965	Poya–Tilleul und Gare–Pérolles Charmettes
?	Vignettaz-Daler–Villars-sur-Glâne, Moncor
16 June 2005	Villars-sur-Glâne, Moncor–Villars-sur-Glâne, Les Dailles (1.23 km)
18 December 2010	Givisiez, Mont-Carmel–Jura Chassotte

Six new trolleybuses with in-motion charging capability, nos. 6611–6616, delivered in 2024–2025, were planned to be used to introduce trolleybus service on bus route 6 – without need for any new overhead wires, as route 6 runs under the wires of route 2 for much of its length and these vehicles are able to operate on battery power on route sections lacking overhead wiring. The first of these to enter service, no. 6611, did so in December 2024. Use of trolleybuses on route 6 began in 2025.

== Lines ==
The present system is made up of the following cross-city routes, including dual-mode line 1:

1	Granges-Paccot, Portes-de-Fribourg – Poya (diesel power); Poya – Pérolles Charmettes (electric power); Pérolles Charmettes – Marly, Gérine (diesel power)	7.5-minute intervals
2	Schönberg Dunant – Villars-sur-Glâne, Les Dailles	At 7.5-minute intervals
3	Givisiez, Mont-Carmel – Pérolles Charmettes	At 15-minute intervals
6	Musy – Windig – Place de la Gare – Bertigny – Hopital Cantonal – Guintzet (operated partially on battery power)	At 15-minute intervals

== Fleet ==
=== Retired fleet ===
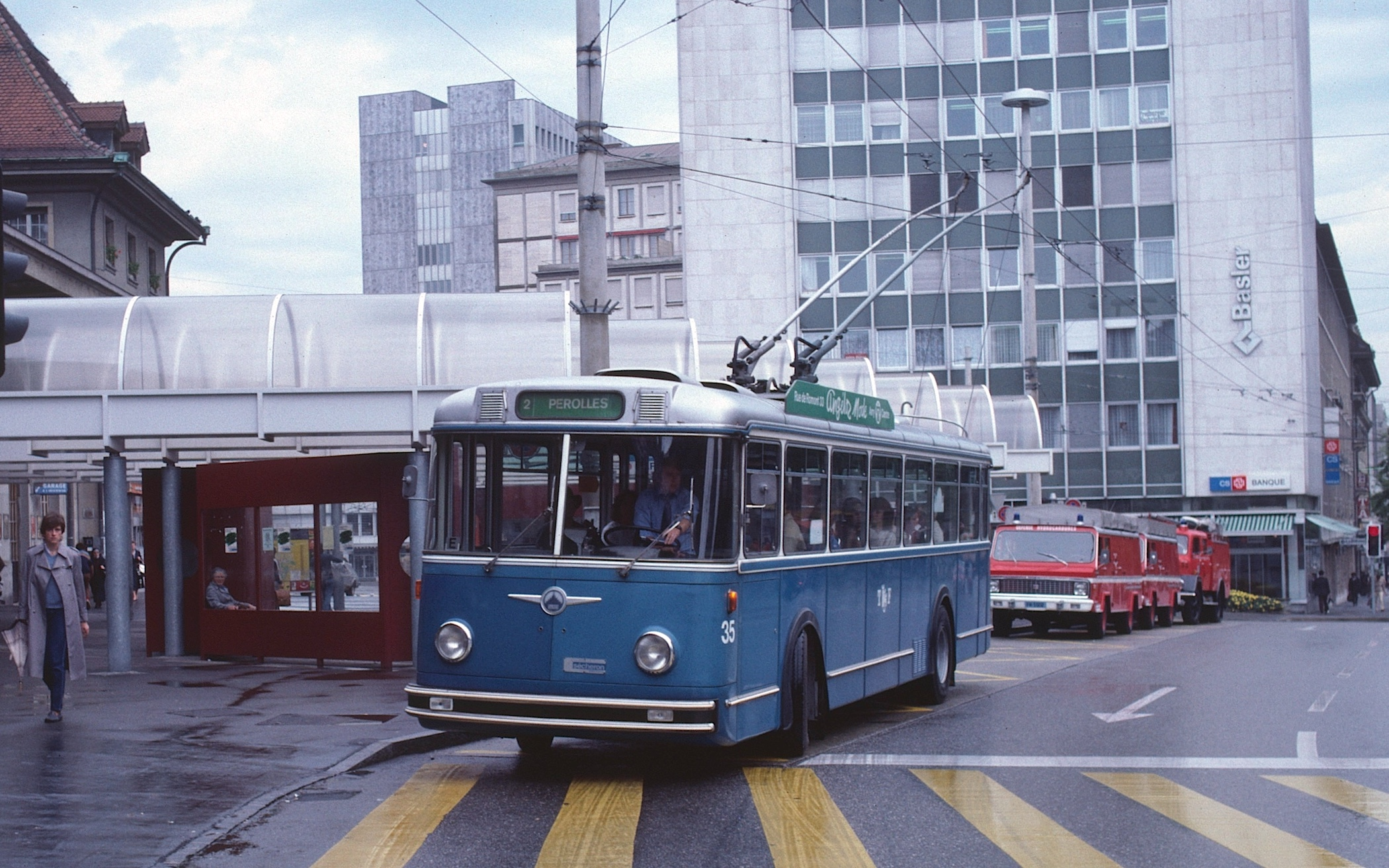
No. 35, a 1964/65 Saurer trolleybus, at the railway station in 1983

In the past, at one time or another the trolleybus fleet has included two-axle vehicles made by several different manufacturers, including Vétra-Renault, Vétra-Berliet, Saurer, Henschel and Volvo. All of these were purchased new except for the four Henschels (nos. 43–46), which came secondhand from the Giessen, Germany, trolleybus system (in whose fleet they had been nos. 19–22). The first articulated vehicles were purchased in 1988–89. Numbered 101–112, they were Hess-bodied Volvos with ABB electrical equipment, and they were also dual-mode. They used their diesel engines to operate unwired extensions – sections not equipped with overhead wires – of trolleybus route 2, beyond Moncor to Les Biches and Les Dailles. In 2005, the route section to Les Dailles was fitted with trolleybus wiring, allowing trolleybuses to serve route 2 entirely in electric mode, except for certain weekday trips to Les Biches, which section remained unwired.

=== Current fleet ===
A total of 27 vehicles is available to operate trolleybus services in Fribourg, all of them low-floor, articulated buses:

Fleet nos	Quantity	Manufacturer	Electrics	Type	Configuration	Built
522–533	12	Hess	Vossloh-Kiepe	BGT-N2C	Trolleybus with auxiliary motor	2010
6601–6609 (Note: The 6601 series originally included a tenth vehicle, number 6610, but it was destroyed by fire in 2021, and a sixth trolleybus was added to the order for the 6611 series, to replace it.)	9	Hess	Kiepe	LighTram 19DC	Trolleybus with in-motion charging	2020
6611–6616	6	Hess	Kiepe	LighTram 19DC	Trolleybus with in-motion charging	2024–2025

== See also ==
- List of trolleybus systems in Switzerland
