= Hauterive Abbey =

Cistercian abbey in Switzerland

Coordinates: 46.763995°N 7.117749°E

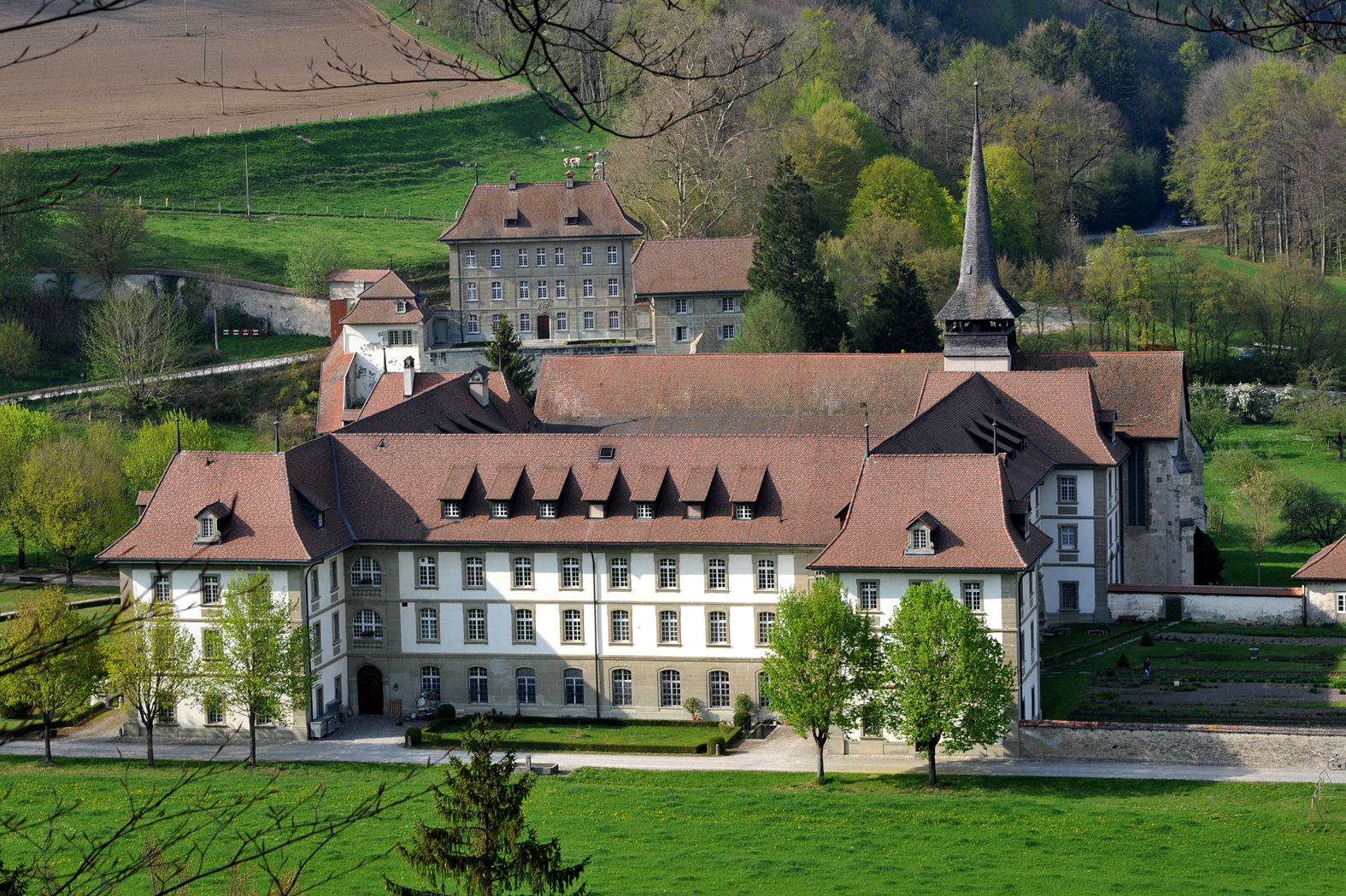
View of the southern side of Hauterive Abbey

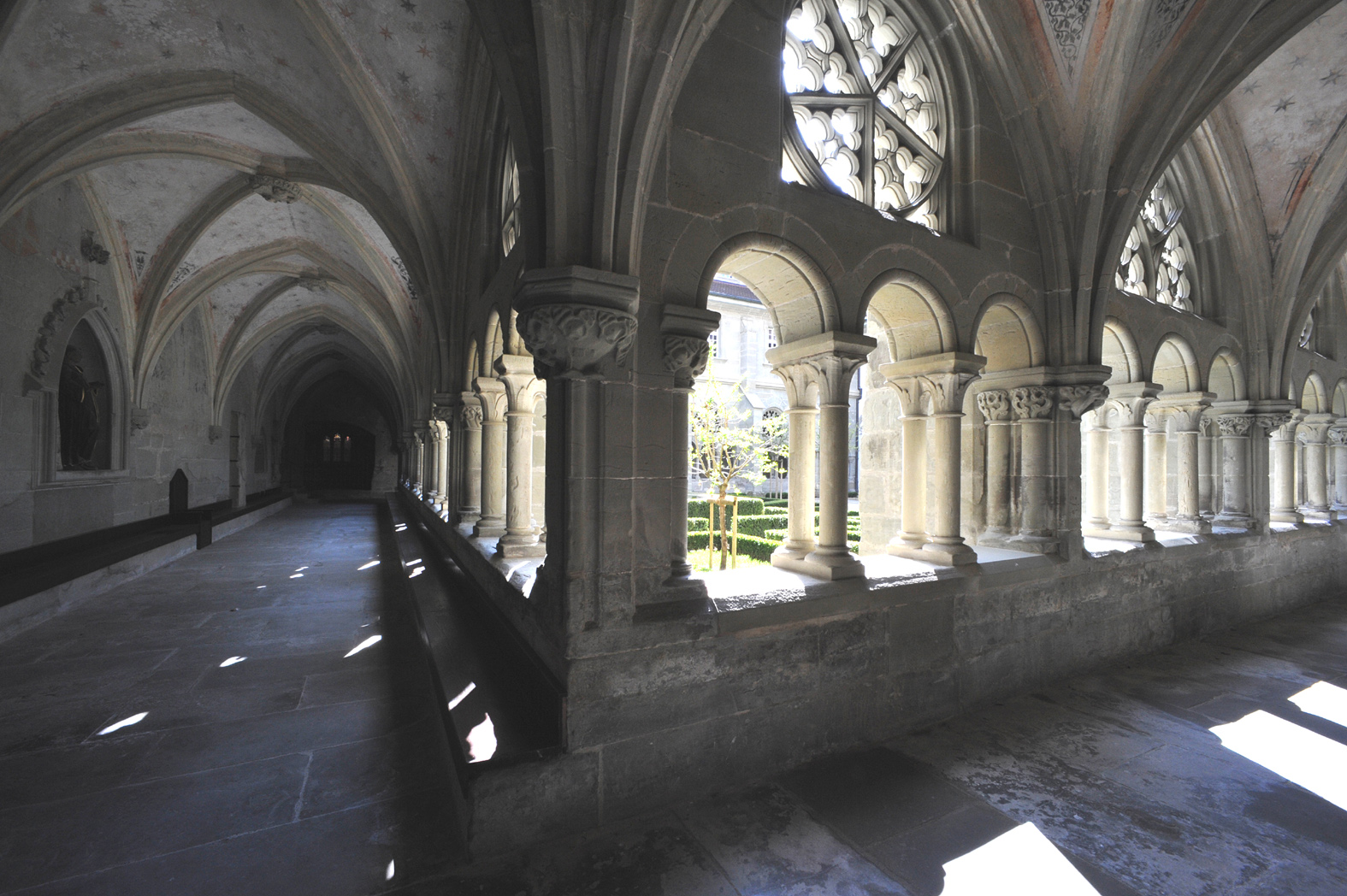
Tracery windows in the cloister

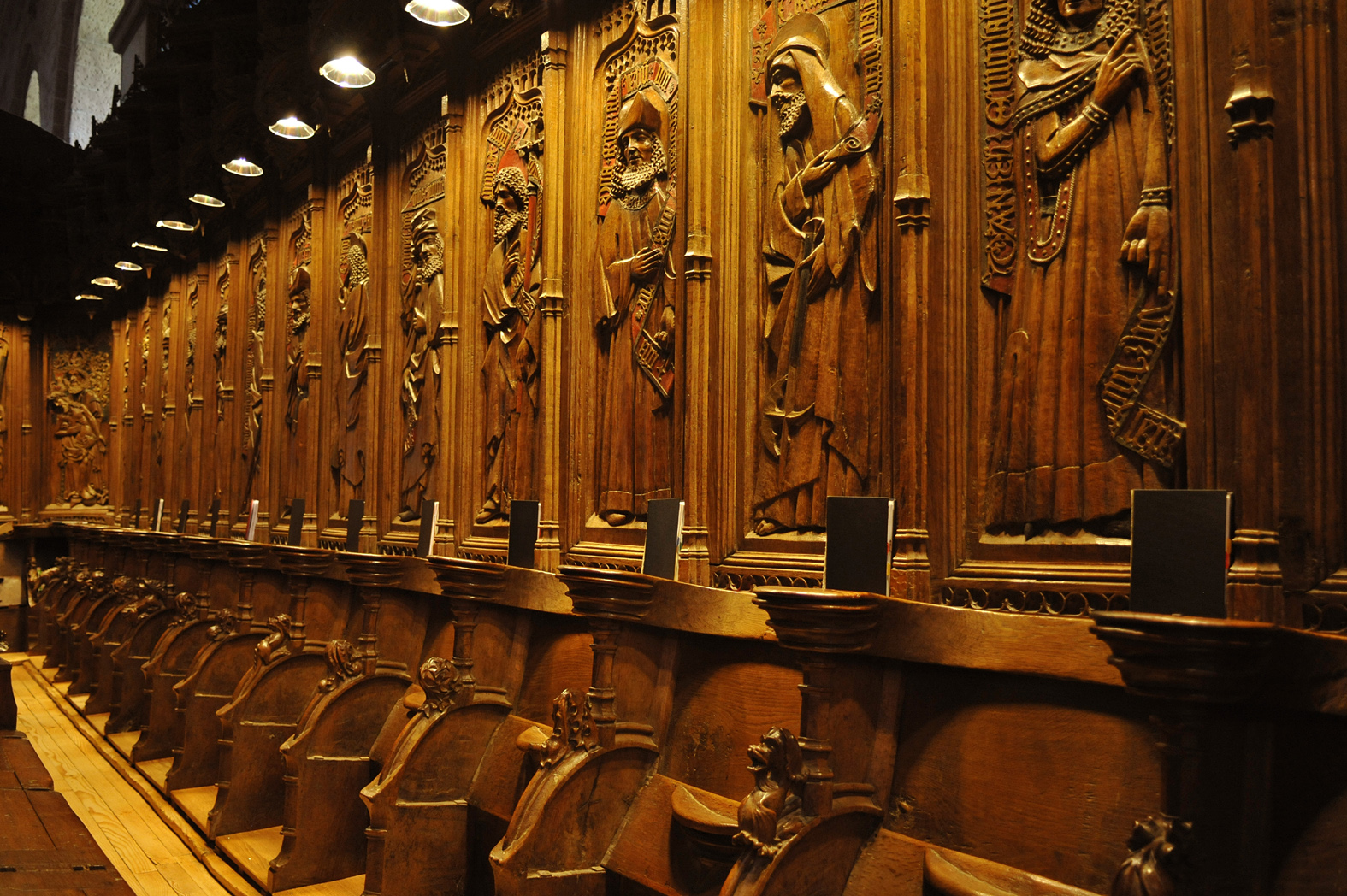
Choir stalls in the abbey church

Hauterive Abbey (French: Abbaye d’Hauterive) is a Cistercian abbey in the Swiss municipality of Hauterive in the canton of Fribourg. It is a Swiss heritage site of national significance. The entire Hauterive area is part of the Inventory of Swiss Heritage Sites.

== History ==
The land for the abbey was donated between 1132-1137 by Baron Guillaume de Glâne (died in 1143, his grave is in the church). After monks moved down from Cherlieu Abbey in northern Burgundy and inhabited the buildings, the Bishop of Lausanne granted permission to consecrate the abbey in 1137. It was then consecrated on 25 February 1138 as the sancte Abbatia Marie de Altaripa. Pope Innocent II confirmed this consecration in 1142. With support from the local nobility and the Bishop of Lausanne, the abbey flourished both economically and culturally in the 12th and early 13th centuries. In 1157 the Dukes of Zähringen granted the abbey their protection and exemption from tolls. The abbey quickly became tied to the city of Fribourg when they began raising sheep for wool to sell to the city. After 1182, citizens of Fribourg had the right to be buried at the abbey. The Chartular of Hauterive (or "Liber donationum") as well as confirmation bull of Innocent III in 1198 and Innocent IV in 1247 all give evidence of a prosperous abbey with extensive landholdings. The abbey was supported by nine villages, in the alpine foothills (dairy industry), the Swiss Plateau (agriculture) and Lake Geneva (wine). The construction of canals in the 12th century, allowed the abbey to build several grain mills and a fulling mill. In 1445 a paper mill was built as well. From the mid-12th century until the 14th there was a significant scriptorium and library at the abbey. The library suffered a number of losses through looting and fires, especially the fire of 1578.

In 1185, the monks from Hauterive founded Kappel Abbey in Kappel am Albis in the Canton of Zurich. In 1261, the La Maigrauge nunnery near Fribourg was placed under the authority of Hauterive. At the end of the 12th century and the early 13th century, the monastery was home to 30-40 monks and about 50 conversi or lay brothers. During this time, the abbey's estates were managed by the lay brothers. In the 14th century, the number of lay brothers decreased and the abbey was forced to lease out the farms.

Under Abbot Peter Rych (1320–1328) the cloister was decorated with tracery windows and the gothic church choir was decorated with six tracery and stained glass windows. Under Abbot Jean Philibert (1472–88) the extensive late gothic choir stalls were added. In 1418 Pope Martin V, during his trip through Switzerland to the Council of Constance, granted abbot Peter Affry (1404–1449) and his successors the pontifical vestments.

During the Sempach war (1386–87), the abbey supported Fribourg and was plundered. During the 1448 war between Bern and Fribourg, the abbey was pillaged by Bernese troops. The damage to the abbey and its lands along with internal conflicts brought about a decline of the abbey.

Around the middle of the 16th century, Fribourg embraced the reforms of the Council of Trent. The city set out to reform and revitalize neighboring monasteries. They enacted reforming provisions in 1562, and appointed an administrator to enact these reforms in the monasteries in 1566. In 1579, the papal nuncio Giovanni Francesco Bonomi visited Hauterive. The reform-minded abbot Moënnat Guillaume (1616–1640), reorganized the nunneries of La Maigrauge and La Fille-Dieu in Romont. In 1618, Hauterive became a member of the Upper-Germanies Cistercian Congregation. The baroque reconstruction of the convent building began in 1715 under Abbot Henri de Fivaz (1715–1742) and was completed in 1770 under Bernhard Emmanuel of Lenzburg (1761–1795). These second flourishing of the abbey stopped in 1798 when they had to pay a war indemnity, after the French invasion, and lost the right to self-rule. In 1811 there were ten priests and six brothers at the abbey, while in 1847, there were 16 priests and two brothers.

The abbey and its lands were secularized in 1848 after the Sonderbund War. The archive and library, including the largest collection of medieval manuscripts in western Switzerland were transferred to Fribourg. The building became an agricultural school in 1850. In 1859 it became the district teacher's college. It was settled by monks from Wettingen-Mehrerau Abbey in 1939 and became an abbey again in 1973. As of 2003, there were eight priests and 16 brothers at the abbey. The buildings and lands, which are farmed by the monks, are held by a foundation. The monks other main activity is the housing and care of guests.

== Abbots ==
- 1939-1950 : Dom Sighard Kleiner
- 1950-1994 : Dom Bernard Kaul
- 1994-2010 : Dom Mauro-Giuseppe Lepori
- 2010- Current: Dom Marc de Pothuau.
