= A12 motorway (Switzerland) =

Motorway in Switzerland

Coordinates: 46.713208°N 7.092769°E

Route of the A12

Basic data
Total Length: ca. 80 kilometres (50 mi)
Junctions

A9
(1)	Junction La Veyre A9
(2)	Châtel-Saint-Denis
(3)	Vaulruz
(4)	Bulle
	Gumefens (340 m)
	La Gruyère
	Avry (170 m)
(5)	Rossens
(6)	Matran
(7)	Fribourg-Sud
(8)	Fribourg-Nord
(9)	Düdingen
(10)	Flamatt
	Thörishaus (110 m)
(11)	Niederwangen
(12)	Bern-Bümpliz/Köniz
(13)	Junction Bern-Weyermannshaus A1
A1

The A12 motorway, an Autobahn in western Switzerland, is a divided highway connecting the A9 to the A1.

The A12 runs from the A9 in Vevey along the Freiburger Alps via Fribourg to the A1 in Bern and thus represents an important link to Western Switzerland. The A12 acts as the main route of the Canton of Freiburg and crosses the Canton area in the diagonal of Chatel-Saint-Denis (in the southwest) to the Flamatt in the northeast. Since 1981, the entire highway has been open to traffic. A scenic location on the Lac de la Gruyère is the resting place de Gruyère, with its adjacent hotel.

== Route ==
The A12 travels from the junction of the A9 La Veyre on a plateau (500 m above sea level) over Vevey. During the first 5.5 kilometres (3.4 mi), the highway rises along the eastern flank of the Veveyse up to 820 metres (2,690 ft) above sea level and forms a sharp S-curve. This highway section, with an average gradient of 5.8% (and maximum gradients over 6%), is one of the steepest stretches of motorway in the Swiss national road network. After the ascent portion, the canyon of Veveyse de Fégire is crossed by a bridge. Once reaching the plateau of Haute Veveyse, at the foot of the Alps, the road has only small differences in height. The culminating point is located, at an altitude of 866 metres (2,841 ft) above sea level, at Weiler Prayoud northeast of Chatel-Saint-Denis. Here are the main European watershed between the Rhone with the catchment area of the Veveyse, and passes the Rhine (with the catchment areas of Broye and Sarine).

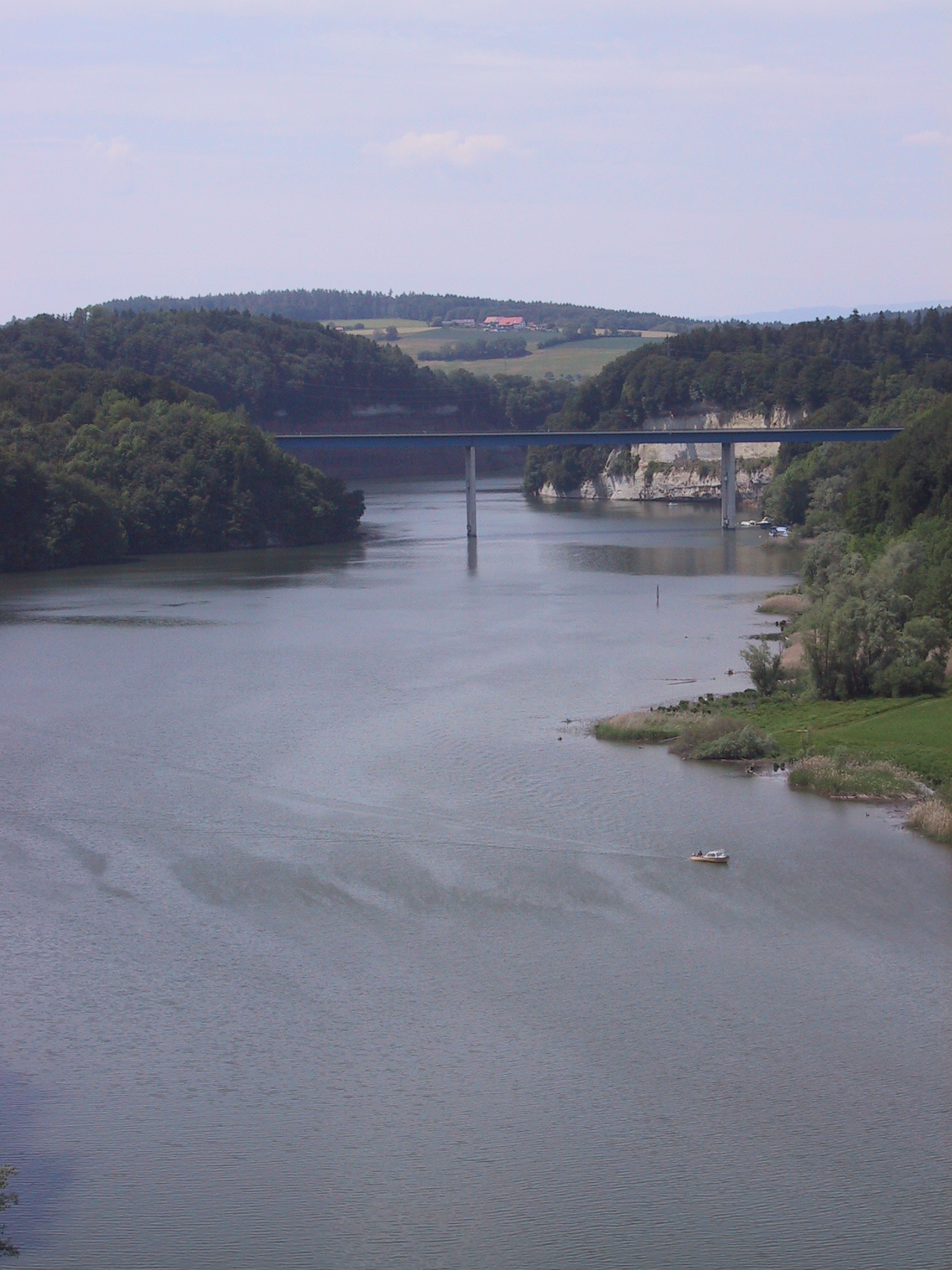
A12 bridge at Schiffenensee

At a length of 15 kilometres (9.3 mi), the A12 now runs at an altitude of about 800 metres (2,600 ft) above sea level, before it reaches the Gruyère region and the basin of Bulle. It then runs between the reservoir Lac de la Gruyère and the heights of Le Gibloux to the north. At Gumefens and Avry-devant-Pont there are two Tagbau-tunnels. North of the latter is the most important building of the A12, the approximately 2-km long Viaduc du Lac de la Gruyère, constructed during the years 1974–1979 in a sweeping curve to the western valley side, spanning two short arms of the Lac de la Gruyère.

Afterwards, the highway enters the Molasse plateau of Freiburg Plateau, tackling in several stages a height difference of just over 100 metres (330 ft). After the bridge over the Glâne, the agglomeration of Freiburg in the west and northwest is bypassed through hilly terrain, known before (with another bridge over the Schiffenensee and Pont de la Madeleine, in line to the little hermitage in the sandstone cliffs near the highway bridge), and thus the Sarine gulch crosses the German/French language border.

As a result, the corridor runs through the little reliefs plateau at Düdingen and Wünnewil. With a bridge at Flamatt, which has a gradient of 4%, the road leaves the plateau and reaches the valley of the Sense (river). Thereafter, the A12 runs through the relatively densely populated and industrial and commercial buildings lined Wangental valley, to the western border of the city of Bern. Following is the Southern Bypass of the district Bümpliz, with an almost 1-kilometre-long (0.62 mi) bridge crossing the plateau, before the highway ends at the junction Weyermannshaus into the A1.

== Engineering structures ==
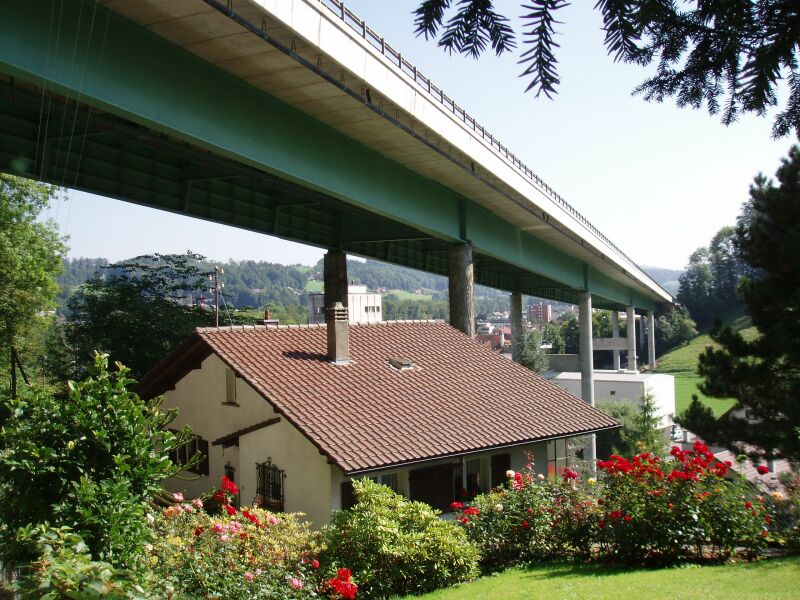
Highway Bridge Flamatt

The A12 has, due to the hilly, pre-alpine topography, some different engineering structures, especially bridges. The most significant of which are (in sequence from Vevey to Bern):

- Viaduct Fégire: 512 m (1,680 ft) long, 90 m (300 ft) high
- Tunnel de Gumefens: 340 m (1,120 ft) long, Tagbautunnel
- Tunnel d'Avry: 170 m (560 ft) long, Tagbautunnel
- Viaduc du Lac de la Gruyère: 2.044 km (1.270 mi) long, 33 piers, piers with a height of 2 to 85 metres (6.6 to 278.9 ft)
- Viaduc de la Glâne: approximately 200 m (660 ft) long, 40 m (130 ft) high
- Pont de la Madeleine (bridge over the Schiffenensee): 320 m (1,050 ft) long, a medium storage level of the lake 41 m (135 ft) above the water surface
- Bridge Flamatt: 648 m (2,126 ft) long, 4% incline, leading through residential and commercial neighborhoods of Flamatt
- Tagbautunnel Thörishaus: 110 m (360 ft) long
- Viaduct Weyermannshaus: 0.912 kilometres (0.567 mi) long, 10 to 15 metres (33 to 49 ft) high

== Historical aspects ==
The leadership of a motorway, through the Canton of Freiburg, had already been studied in the 1950s decade. Concrete plans on the lines of the first sections have been around since the beginning of the 1960s. The first walked the line between Corpataux Matran and the end of 1963, for consultation, a year later it was followed by the northeastern continuation of the highway to Düdingen. In 1966 and 1967, the sections were sanctioned by the then Department of the Environment, Transport, Energy and Communications of the Swiss Federal and soon started to build.

On 31 July 1971, with the section of Düdingen Corpataux, the first leg of the A12 was in operation. The city of Fribourg was thus a bypass for transit traffic. It was first created by Matran Corpataux as only one lane, the second lane followed about seven years later. The last section of the A12, between Vaulruz and Vevey, was opened at the end of 1981.

Opening of the A12 Autobahn sections
Section	Date
A1 - Thörishaus	7 Dec 1977
Thörishaus - Flamatt	6 Dec 1976
Flamatt - Düdingen	27 Sep 1973
Düdingen - Matran	31 Jul 1971
Matran - Corpataux: 1st Richtungsfahrbahn	31 Jul 1971
Matran - Corpataux: 2nd Richtungsfahrbahn	14 Jul 1978
Corpataux - Avry-devant-Pont	31 Oct 1979
Avry-devant-Pont - Vuippens	23 Nov 1981
Vuippens - Bulle	8 Nov 1978
Bulle - Vaulruz	29 Jul 1977
Vaulruz - A9	23 Nov 1981

The thruway A12 existed from end to end in 1981, as a motorway link between the German-speaking Switzerland and those in western Switzerland. As a result, developed the line from Bern via the A12 and the A9 for Lausanne on the A1 for approximately 20 years to the main transit route between Zürich and Geneva. However, the A12, during the winter, was always vulnerable to ice and snow-covered roadways because of the steep gradients and long sections at elevations above 700 metres (2,300 ft).

As has been made consistently in 2001, the A1 is also in operation, shifted back some of the traffic on the originally planned as a transit route highway. This is very well documented by the counting stations of Wünnewil and bull (overland routes), which in 2000 were measured in the average daily volume of 29,000 vehicles, 2002 just over 22,000 vehicles (about 20% less than two years before). The highest traffic densities on the A12 were recorded 2004, in the Fribourg area, with an average daily traffic of 29,000 vehicles.

The full opening of the A12 in particular gave the regions of Fribourg and Bones and the structurally Haute Veveyse important economic stimulus and led to the easy accessibility to the tourist region of Gruyère, both from the Lake Geneva region as well as from Berne.

== Major engineering works ==
The following are major construction projects underway along A12:

- (none at present)
