= List of mire landscapes in Switzerland =

The List of mire landscapes in Switzerland is a list of Swiss bogs and wetlands. It is from the Federal Inventory of Mire Landscapes of Particular Beauty and National Importance in Switzerland.

== Mire landscapes ==
#	Site	Canton(s)	Municipalities	Since	Revis.
1	Rothenthurm	ZG, SZ	Einsiedeln, Feusisberg, Oberägeri, Rothenthurm	1996	2004
2	Les Ponts-de-Martel	NE	Brot-Plamboz, Les Ponts- de-Martel, Noiraigue, Travers	1996	
3	Schwantenau	SZ	Einsiedeln	1996	
5	Pfäffikersee	ZH	Fehraltorf, Pfäffikon, Seegräben, Wetzikon	1996	
6	Zugerberg	ZG	Walchwil, Zug	1996	2004
7	Etang de la Gruère	JU, BE	Le Bémont, Montfaucon, Saignelégier, Tramelan	1996	
8	Hinter Höhi	SG	Amden, Nesslau	1996	
9	La Vraconnaz	VD	Sainte-Croix	1996	
10	Breitried/Unteriberg	SZ	Einsiedeln, Unteriberg	1996	
11	Chaltenbrunnen	BE	Meiringen, Schattenhalb	1996	
12	La Chaux-des-Breuleux	JU, BE	La Chaux-des-Breuleux, Mont-Tramelan, Saignelégier, Tramelan	1966	
13	Habkern/Sörenberg	LU, BE	Beatenberg, Eriz, Flühli, Habkern, Horrenbach-Buchen, Niederried bei Interlaken, Oberried am Brienzersee, Schangnau	1996	2007
15	Glaubenberg	OW, LU	Alpnach, Entlebuch, Flühli, Giswil, Hasle, Sarnen, Schüpfheim, Schwarzenberg	1996	
16	Bellelay	BE	Châtelat, Saicourt	1996	2007
19	Lauenensee	BE	Gsteig, Lauenen	1996	
21	Vallée de Joux	VD	L'Abbaye, Le Chenit	1996	2001
22	Gamperfin	SG	Grabs	1996	
25	Ibergeregg	SZ	Alpthal, Einsiedeln, Oberiberg, Schwyz, Unteriberg	1996	2007
27	Les Pontins	BE	Saint-Imier, Sonvilier	1996	2007
33	Les Gurles	FR	Grangettes, Marsens, Sâles, Riaz	1996	
35	La Chaux-d'Abel	BE, JU	Le Noirmont, Les Bois, Muriaux, Saint-Imier, Sonvilier	1996	
37	Hirzel	ZH	Hirzel, Horgen, Schönenberg, Wädenswil	1996	
38	Rotmoos/Eriz	BE	Eriz, Horrenbach-Buchen, Schangnau, Sigriswil	1996	
39	Lac de Lussy	FR	Châtel-Saint-Denis, Remaufens	1996	2004
45	God da Staz/Stazerwald	GR	Celerina/Schlarigna, St. Moritz	1996	
53	San Bernardino	GR	Hinterrhein, Mesocco	1996	
55	Schwändital	GL	Näfels, Oberurnen	1996	
56	Alp Nadéls	GR	Trun	1996	
59	Wolzenalp	SG	Ebnat-Kappel, Nesslau	1996	
62	Schwägalp	SG, AR, AI	Alt St. Johann, Gonten, Hundwil, Krummenau, Nesslau, Schwende, Stein, Urnäsch	1996	2004
66	Chellen	SG	Ebnat-Kappel, Hemberg, Krummenau, Wattwil	1996	
88	Creux du Croue	VD	Arzier	1996	
93	Le Niremont	FR	Châtel-Saint-Denis, Semsales	1996	
94	La Brévine	NE	La Brévine, La Chaux-du-Milieu, Le Cerneux-Péquignot	1996	
98	Klein Entlen	LU	Entlebuch, Flühli, Hasle, Schüpfheim	1996	
99	Col des Mosses/La Lécherette	VD	Château-d'Oex, Ormont-Dessous	1996	2001
105	Unterägeri	ZG	Unterägeri, Zug	1996	2004
106	Wetzikon/Hinwil	ZH	Dürnten, Gossau, Hinwil, Wetzikon	1996	
109	Furner Berg	GR	Furna, Jenaz, Schiers	1996	
110	Fulensee	UR	Erstfeld	1996	
118	Sparenmoos/Neuenberg	BE	Boltigen, Zweisimmen	1996	
119	Haslerberg/Betelberg	BE	Lauenen, Lenk	1996	
132	Unter Hüttenbüel	SG	Ebnat-Kappel, Gommiswald, Rieden, Wattwil	1996	
163	Gurnigel/Gantrisch	BE	Blumenstein, Guggisberg, Rüeggisberg, Rüschegg, Rüti bei Riggisberg	1996	
189	Lucomagno/Dötra	TI	Olivone	1996	
204	Göscheneralp	UR	Göschenen	1996	
217	Alp Flix	GR	Sur	1996	
226	Val Fenga	GR	Ramosch, Sent	1996	
227	Faninpass	GR	Fideris, Jenaz, Peist	1996	
232	Oberbauen/Scheidegg	NW, UR	Emmetten, Seelisberg	1996	
235	Sägel/Lauerzersee	SZ	Arth, Lauerz, Steinen	1996	
251	Maschwander Allmend	ZG, ZH	Cham, Hünenberg, Maschwanden, Obfelden	1996	2004
260	Piano di Magadino	TI	Cadenazzo, Cugnasco, Giubiasco, Gordola, Gudo, Locarno, Magadino, S. Antonino, Sementina	1996	
263	Val da Sett	GR	Bivio	1996	
265	Tamangur	GR	Scuol, Valchava	1996	
268	Grimsel	BE	Guttannen	2004	2007
275	Petersinsel	BE	Erlach, Twann	1996	
280	Aare/Giessen	BE	Allmendingen, Belp, Muri bei Bern, Rubigen	1996	
289	Les Grangettes	VD	Noville	1996	2004
296	Le Marais des Monod	VD	Apples, Ballens, Mollens, Montricher, Pampigny	1996	
302	Val de Réchy	VS	Nax	1996	
315	Maighels	GR	Tujetsch	1996	
319	Riet/Tamons	SG	Mels	1996	
320	Tratza-Pany	GR	Luzein	1996	
322	Albrun	VS	Binn	1996	
324	Vorder Höhi	SG	Alt St. Johann, Amden	1996	
325	Alpe di Chièra	TI	Osco, Quinto	1996	
326	Monti di Medeglia	TI	Isone, Medeglia, Robasacco	1996	
336	Amsoldingen	BE	Amsoldingen, Höfen, Thierachern, Uebeschi	1996	2004
339	Albrist	BE	St. Stephan	1996	
347	Alpe Zaria	TI	Fusio	1996	
351	Frauenwinkel	SZ	Freienbach	1996	
357	Urnerboden	UR, GL	Linthal, Spiringen	1996	
359	Plaun Segnas Sut	GR	Flims	1996	
364	Alp da Stierva	GR	Mon, Salouf, Stierva	1996	
365	Alp Anarosa	GR	Casti-Wergenstein	1996	
368	Buffalora	GR	Tschierv	1996	
369	Plan da San Franzesch	GR	Poschiavo	1996	
370	Hilferenpass	LU	Escholzmatt, Flühli, Marbach	1996	
378	Neeracher Ried	ZH	Dielsdorf, Hochfelden, Höri, Neerach, Niederglatt, Niederhasli, Stadel, Steinmaur	1996	
385	Lützelsee	ZH	Bubikon, Gossau, Grüningen, Hombrechtikon, Stäfa	1996	
387	Gräppelen	SG	Alt St. Johann	1996	
390	Bachsee	BE	Grindelwald	1996	
391	Grosse Scheidegg	BE	Grindelwald	1996	
414	Durannapass	GR	Conters im Prättigau, Langwies	1996	
416	Grande Cariçaie	VD, FR, BE, NE	Chabrey, Cheseaux-Noréaz, Chevroux, Cheyres, Châbles, Cudrefin, Delley-Portalban, Estavayer-le-Lac, Font, Gampelen, Gletterens, Haut-Vully, Ins, Marin-Epagnier, Vernay, Yverdon-les-Bains, Yvonand	1996	2001/2007
419	Steingletscher	BE	Gadmen	1996	
420	Fänerenspitz	AI, SG	Altstätten, Oberriet, Rüte	1996	2004
421	Val da Campasc/Passo del Bernina	GR	Poschiavo	1996	

== See also ==
- Nature parks in Switzerland
