= Grattavache =

Former municipality, canton of Fribourg

- Former municipality
- Coat of arms
- Location of Grattavache
- Location within Switzerland Location within Canton of Fribourg
- Coordinates: 46.599999°N 6.916666°E
- Country: Switzerland
- Canton: Fribourg
- District: Veveyse
- Municipality: La Verrerie

Population (2000)
  - Total: 225
- Time zone: UTC+01:00 (CET)
  - Summer (DST): UTC+02:00 (CEST)
- ISO 3166 code: CH-FR
- Website

Grattavache is a former municipality in the Veveyse district of the canton of Fribourg, Switzerland. Since 2004 it has formed the municipality of La Verrerie together with Progens and Le Crêt. A dispersed settlement, it lies at the sources of the Mionnaz, between Le Crêt and Semsales.

== History ==
Grattavache is first mentioned in 1403 as Ginta Vachi. In the Middle Ages it was part of the castellany of Rue and of the parish of Saint-Martin-de-Vaud. The conquest of the Pays de Vaud in 1536 made it a Fribourg possession. Grattavache was attached to the parish of Le Crêt in 1670. It belonged to the bailiwick of Rue and, from 1798, to the district of Rue, and since 1848 it has been part of the Veveyse district.

The La Vaux stream powered mills. A school is recorded in Grattavache in 1799. At the beginning of the 19th century Jean Baptiste Jérôme Brémond, the owner of the mines and glassworks of Semsales, built the farm of La Châtelaine there, a large model farm that was enlarged by bringing pasture land and peat bogs into use after the fuel had been extracted. The building housing the school and the cheese dairy (now a shoemaker's workshop) was built around 1850.

Grattavache has remained mainly a village of farming and crafts. The construction of the A12 in the 1970s led to a land consolidation. The population grew strongly in the following decade with the development of a residential zone. In 2000 commuters made up more than two thirds of the working population.

Grattavache had 192 inhabitants in 1850, 215 in 1900, 163 in 1950, 134 in 1980 and 225 in 2000.

== Bibliography ==
- G. Bourgoin, Progens, 1986
