= St. Martin, Switzerland =

St. Martin may refer to several places in Switzerland:

- Saint-Martin, Fribourg, in the Canton of Fribourg
- St. Martin, Graubünden, in the canton of Graubünden
- Saint-Martin, Valais, in the Canton of Valais
