= Le Crêt =

Former municipality, canton of Fribourg

- Former municipality
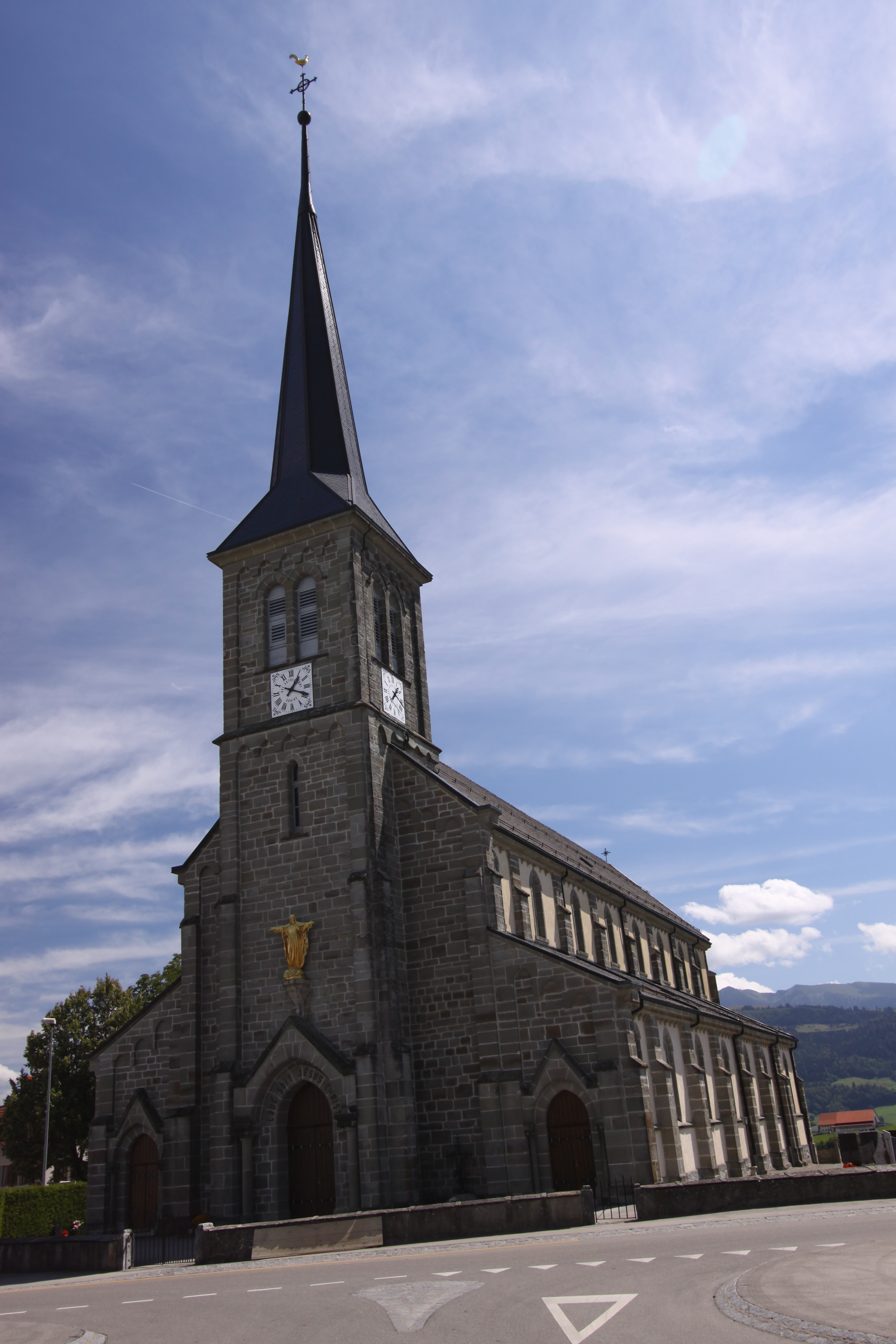
- Church of Saint-Loup

- Coat of arms
- Location of Le Crêt
- Location within Switzerland Location within Canton of Fribourg
- Coordinates: 46.616668°N 6.916662°E
- Country: Switzerland
- Canton: Fribourg
- District: Veveyse
- Municipality: La Verrerie

Population (2000)
  - Total: 392
- Time zone: UTC+01:00 (CET)
  - Summer (DST): UTC+02:00 (CEST)
- ISO 3166 code: CH-FR
- Website

Le Crêt is a former municipality in the Veveyse district of the canton of Fribourg, Switzerland. Since 2004 it has formed the municipality of La Verrerie together with Grattavache and Progens. On the road from Lausanne to Bulle, the municipality comprised the village of Le Crêt, several hamlets, including Montborget and Bremudens, and scattered dwellings.

== History ==
The lords of Rue and of Oron and the counts of Gruyère successively held property and rights in Le Crêt, which passed to Fribourg in 1555. It belonged to the bailiwick of Rue until 1798 and then to the district of the same name until 1848, when it became part of the Veveyse district.

In church matters, Le Crêt depended on Saint-Martin until it was made a parish in 1665/1670. The chapel of Saint-Loup, consecrated in 1663, was replaced by a new church in 1889. The parish includes Grattavache, which was separated from the parish of Saint-Martin, and Les Ecasseys, which was separated from that of Vuisternens-devant-Romont. A school is mentioned from 1716; it received a donation from the André-Joseph Rossier foundation.

Le Crêt has remained a village of farming and crafts; in 2000 agriculture provided more than half of the jobs. Peat was extracted during both world wars.

Le Crêt had 409 inhabitants in 1850, 487 in 1888, 473 in 1900, 475 in 1950, 353 in 1980 and 392 in 2000.

== Bibliography ==
- A. Dellion, Dictionnaire historique et statistique des paroisses catholiques du canton de Fribourg, vol. 7, pp. 226–245
