= Lussy =

Lussy may refer to:

- Lussy-sur-Morges, Vaud, Switzerland
- Lussy, Fribourg, a former municipality in Villaz, Fribourg, Switzerland
- Lac de Lussy at Châtel-Saint-Denis, Fribourg, Switzerland
- Melchior Lussy, (1529-1606) a Swiss statesman who represented the Catholic cantons of Switzerland in the Council of Trent
