= Porsel =

Former municipality, canton of Fribourg

- Former municipality
- Coat of arms
- Location of Porsel
- Location within Switzerland Location within Canton of Fribourg
- Coordinates: 46.600002°N 6.866668°E
- Country: Switzerland
- Canton: Fribourg
- District: Veveyse
- Municipality: Le Flon

Population (2000)
  - Total: 407
- Time zone: UTC+01:00 (CET)
  - Summer (DST): UTC+02:00 (CEST)
- ISO 3166 code: CH-FR
- Website

Porsel is a former municipality in the Veveyse district of the canton of Fribourg, Switzerland, on the road from Oron to Romont. Since 2004 it has formed the municipality of Le Flon together with Pont and Bouloz.

== History ==
Porsel is first mentioned in 1147/1163 as Porcels. An axe from the Late Bronze Age and the remains of a Roman settlement have been found there. In the Middle Ages Porsel belonged to the lords of Oron; in 1393 property there was granted as a fief to the d'Illens family, lords of Pont. After the bankruptcy of the Gruyère family, Porsel was incorporated into the bailiwick of Rue (1555–1798), then into the district of Rue (1798–1848) and finally into the Veveyse district.

In church matters, Porsel depended on Saint-Martin until it was made a parish together with Bouloz in 1641. A confraternity is recorded in the 14th century and the chapel of Saint Gorgonius in 1384. The parish church was built in 1642–1645, rebuilt in 1735–1739 and enlarged in 1872 and 1939–1943. Mossel in 1939 and then Pont, detached from Saint-Martin, in 1958 were assigned to the parish of Porsel.

A molasse quarry was worked in the 19th century, and peat was cut during the Second World War. The dairy and cheese-making society of Bouloz-Porsel was founded in 1892, and a regional home economics school existed from 1940 to 1973. Traditionally engaged in livestock farming (14 farms in 2000), the municipality saw residential development after the 1980s; in 2000, 70% of its working population were commuters.

Porsel had 226 inhabitants in 1811, 323 in 1850, 334 in 1900, 368 in 1950, 283 in 1980 and 407 in 2000. In 2004 it became part of the municipality of Le Flon.

== Bibliography ==
- L. Waeber and A. Schuwey, Eglises et chapelles du canton de Fribourg, 1957, pp. 251–253
