= Bouloz =

Former municipality, canton of Fribourg

- Former municipality
- Coat of arms
- Location of Bouloz
- Location within Switzerland Location within Canton of Fribourg
- Coordinates: 46.616673°N 6.883332°E
- Country: Switzerland
- Canton: Fribourg
- District: Veveyse
- Municipality: Le Flon

Population (2000)
  - Total: 276
- Time zone: UTC+01:00 (CET)
  - Summer (DST): UTC+02:00 (CEST)
- ISO 3166 code: CH-FR
- Website

Bouloz is a former municipality in the Veveyse district of the canton of Fribourg, Switzerland, on the road from Oron to Romont. In 2004 it merged with Pont and Porsel to form the municipality of Le Flon.

== History ==
Bouloz is first mentioned in 1018 as Bedolosci and in 1154 as Bolohc. In the 12th century a family of Bouloz was among the benefactors of the monastery of Hautcrêt. Hugues de Rueyres and his brothers gave the monastery of Hautcrêt the tithe of the "grange of Bouloz", a donation confirmed by bulls of Adrian IV in 1155 and Alexander III in 1179. In 1188 Guillaume de Rue transferred all his rights and property in Bouloz to the same monastery. Before 1244–1246 Conon de Prez gave Hauterive Abbey the holding of Jacques de Bolos on the territory of Bouloz. The great tithe of Bouloz was sold to Louis of Savoy by a deed of 1306.

From 1536 Bouloz belonged to the bailiwick of Rue, and from 1798 to 1848 to the district of the same name. It was part of the parish of Saint-Martin and was attached to Porsel when that parish was established in 1641. The marshes were drained from 1948 to 1950. Bouloz is a rural village with dairy farming; in 1990, 72% of its working population worked in the primary sector.

Bouloz had 167 inhabitants in 1811, 219 in 1850, 245 in 1900, 211 in 1950 and 276 in 2000. In 2004 it became part of the municipality of Le Flon.
