= Progens =

Former municipality, canton of Fribourg

- Former municipality
- Coat of arms
- Location of Progens
- Location within Switzerland Location within Canton of Fribourg
- Coordinates: 46.583339°N 6.916658°E
- Country: Switzerland
- Canton: Fribourg
- District: Veveyse
- Municipality: La Verrerie

Population (2000)
  - Total: 245
- Time zone: UTC+01:00 (CET)
  - Summer (DST): UTC+02:00 (CEST)
- ISO 3166 code: CH-FR
- Website

Progens is a former municipality in the Veveyse district of the canton of Fribourg, Switzerland. Since 2004 it has formed the municipality of La Verrerie together with Le Crêt and Grattavache. It consisted of the village of Progens, on a hill between the Broye and the Mionna, and the hamlet of La Verrerie on the hill's north-eastern slope.

== History ==
Progens is first mentioned in 1324 as Progin. In the Middle Ages it belonged to the lordship of Oron, which was partly in the hands of the counts of Gruyère, and to the lordship of Rue, a Savoyard castellany from the middle of the 13th century. Progens passed to Fribourg in two stages: in 1536 with Rue, and in 1555 after the bankruptcy of the counts of Gruyère. The village was part of the bailiwick of Rue from 1536 to 1798, then of the district of the same name (1798), of the district of Châtel-Saint-Denis (1831) and of the Veveyse district (1848).

In church matters, Progens depended on Saint-Martin until it was made a parish in 1888. The chapel of Saint Bartholomew, attested in 1677, became the parish church.

Lignite mines and a glassworks, around which the hamlet of La Verrerie grew up, were operated at the end of the 18th century. The glassworks was given new impetus by the French industrialist Jean Baptiste Jérôme Brémond; co-owned by the Quennec family from 1862, it produced crystal and bottles. It was bought by the glassworks of Saint-Prex in the canton of Vaud and closed in 1914. Coal was mined again from 1917 to 1921.

Progens is rural (ten farms in 2000) and has seen residential development. In 2000 seven tenths of the working population were commuters.

Progens had 99 inhabitants in 1811, 164 in 1850, 370 in 1900, 281 in 1950, 225 in 1980 and 245 in 2000.

== Bibliography ==
- G. Bourgoin, Progens, [1986]
- J.-C. Vial, "Les mines de St-Martin et Progens", in Annales fribourgeoises, 60, 1992/1993, pp. 195–218
