= Veveyse District =

Coordinates: 46°33′03″N 6°54′39″E

- District
- Coat of arms
- Country: Switzerland
- Canton: Fribourg
- Capital: Châtel-Saint-Denis

Area
  - Total: 134.3 km^{2} (51.9 sq mi)

Population (2008)
  - Total: 15,339
  - Density: 114.2/km^{2} (295.8/sq mi)
- Time zone: UTC+1 (CET)
  - Summer (DST): UTC+2 (CEST)
- Municipalities: 9
- Website: Veveyse

Veveyse District (German: Bezirk Vivisbach; French: District de la Veveyse [distʁi(kt) d(ə) la vəvɛːz]; Arpitan: District de la Vevêse [diʃˈtʁi də la vəˈveʒə]) is one of seven districts in the canton of Fribourg in Switzerland. It has a population of 19,572 (as of 31 December 2020). It takes its name from the river Veveyse which flows through the district.

== Municipalities ==
It consists of the following municipalities:

Coat of Arms	Municipality	Population (31 December 2020)	Area in km^{2}
Attalens	Attalens	3,580	9.74
Bossonens	Bossonnens	1,501	4.12
Châtel-Saint-Denis	Châtel-Saint-Denis	7,449	47.93
Granges (Veveyse)	Granges (Veveyse)	854	4.46
La Verrerie	La Verrerie	1,301	13.43
Le Flon	Le Flon	1,223	9.57
Remaufens	Remaufens	1,212	5.91
Saint-Martin	Saint-Martin	1,026	9.78
Semsales	Semsales	1,426	29.36
	Total	19,572	110.1

== Coat of arms ==
The blazon of the district coat of arms is Or, an Eagle displayed Sable.

== Demographics ==
Veveyse has a population (as of December 2020) of 19,572. Most of the population (as of 2000) speaks French (11,566 or 91.7%) as their first language, German is the second most common (345 or 2.7%) and Portuguese is the third (306 or 2.4%). There are 86 people who speak Italian and 3 people who speak Romansh.

As of 2008, the population was 49.9% male and 50.1% female. The population was made up of 6,393 Swiss men (41.1% of the population) and 1,358 (8.7%) non-Swiss men. There were 6,586 Swiss women (42.4%) and 1,203 (7.7%) non-Swiss women. Of the population in the district, 4,511 or about 35.8% were born in Veveyse and lived there in 2000. There were 2,746 or 21.8% who were born in the same canton, while 3,263 or 25.9% were born somewhere else in Switzerland, and 1,678 or 13.3% were born outside of Switzerland.

As of 2000, there were 5,297 people who were single and never married in the district. There were 6,001 married individuals, 699 widows or widowers and 617 individuals who are divorced.

There were 1,447 households that consist of only one person and 406 households with five or more people.

The historical population is given in the following chart:

== Mergers and name changes ==
- On 1 January 1968 the former municipality of La Rougève merged into Semsales.
- On 1 January 2004 the former municipalities of Bouloz, Pont (Veveyse) and Porsel merged to form the new municipality of Le Flon, the former municipalities of Grattavache, Le Crêt and Progens merged to form the new municipality of La Verrerie and the former municipalities of Besencens and Fiaugères merged into the previously existing municipality of Saint-Martin.

== Politics ==
In the 2011 federal election the most popular party was the SPS which received 28.5% of the vote. The next three most popular parties were the SVP (27.2%), the CVP (18.2%) and the FDP (8.4%).

The SPS improved their position in Veveyse rising to first, from second in 2007 (with 24.7%) The SVP moved from first in 2007 (with 30.2%) to second in 2011, the CVP lost popularity (24.0% in 2007) and the FDP retained about the same popularity (9.8% in 2007). A total of 4,473 votes were cast in this election, of which 61 or 1.4% were invalid.

== Religion ==
From the 2000 census, 9,046 or 71.7% were Roman Catholic, while 1,669 or 13.2% belonged to the Swiss Reformed Church. Of the rest of the population, there were 71 members of an Orthodox church (or about 0.56% of the population), there were 8 individuals (or about 0.06% of the population) who belonged to the Christian Catholic Church, and there were 268 individuals (or about 2.12% of the population) who belonged to another Christian church. There were 6 individuals (or about 0.05% of the population) who were Jewish, and 239 (or about 1.89% of the population) who were Islamic. There were 14 individuals who were Buddhist, 2 individuals who were Hindu and 10 individuals who belonged to another church. 927 (or about 7.35% of the population) belonged to no church, are agnostic or atheist, and 482 individuals (or about 3.82% of the population) did not answer the question.

== Education ==
In Veveyse about 4,111 or (32.6%) of the population have completed non-mandatory upper secondary education, and 1,259 or (10.0%) have completed additional higher education (either university or a Fachhochschule). Of the 1,259 who completed tertiary schooling, 57.8% were Swiss men, 26.4% were Swiss women, 8.8% were non-Swiss men and 7.0% were non-Swiss women.

The Canton of Fribourg school system provides one year of non-obligatory Kindergarten, followed by six years of Primary school. This is followed by three years of obligatory lower Secondary school where the students are separated according to ability and aptitude. Following the lower Secondary students may attend a three or four year optional upper Secondary school. The upper Secondary school is divided into gymnasium (university preparatory) and vocational programs. After they finish the upper Secondary program, students may choose to attend a Tertiary school or continue their apprenticeship.

During the 2010-11 school year, there were a total of 2,377 students attending 122 classes in Veveyse. A total of 2,889 students from the district attended any school, either in the district or outside of it. There were 20 kindergarten classes with a total of 350 students in the district. The district had 68 primary classes and 1,336 students. During the same year, there were 32 lower secondary classes with a total of 660 students. There was one upper Secondary class, with 20 upper Secondary students. The district had one special Tertiary class, with 11 specialized Tertiary students.
