= Fiaugères =

Former municipality, canton of Fribourg

- Former municipality
- Location of Fiaugères
- Location within Switzerland Location within Canton of Fribourg
- Coordinates: 46.583334°N 6.883335°E
- Country: Switzerland
- Canton: Fribourg
- District: Veveyse
- Municipality: Saint-Martin

Population (2000)
  - Total: 173
- Time zone: UTC+01:00 (CET)
  - Summer (DST): UTC+02:00 (CEST)
- ISO 3166 code: CH-FR
- Website

Fiaugères is a former municipality in the Veveyse district of the canton of Fribourg, Switzerland. Since 2004 it has been part of the municipality of Saint-Martin. It lies on the road from Lausanne to Bulle, north-east of Oron-la-Ville, and its houses are scattered over the northern side of the valley of the Mionnaz.

== History ==
Fiaugères is first mentioned around 1150 as Felgeria, in 1273 as Fiougiere and in 1488 as Villa dou bos es fyougires. The oldest mention (1150) is in the cartulary of the abbey of Hautcrêt; in 1273 the monks owned a mill there. In the Middle Ages Fiaugères belonged to the lordship of Oron. In 1432 the Duke of Savoy acquired the tithe of Fiaugères, which changed hands several times until Fribourg bought it in 1542. As a possession of Fribourg, Fiaugères was incorporated into the bailiwick, and later the district, of Rue. Its communal statutes were ratified by the government in 1702.

In 1763 the village of Besencens, which also became part of Saint-Martin in 2004, separated from Fiaugères and formed a municipality of its own. Fiaugères was incorporated into the Veveyse district in 1848. It belongs to the parish of Saint-Martin and has a chapel, built in 1884 and dedicated to the Immaculate Conception. The village has remained rural.

Fiaugères had 187 inhabitants in 1811, 251 in 1850, 279 in 1900, 296 in 1950 and 173 in 2000. In 2004 it became part of the municipality of Saint-Martin.

== Bibliography ==
- A. Dellion, Dictionnaire historique et statistique des paroisses catholiques du canton de Fribourg, vol. 11, pp. 34–35
- P.-A. Musy, Commune de Fiaugères, [1983?]
