= Le Flon =

- Municipality
- Flag Coat of arms
- Location of Le Flon
- Location within Switzerland Location within Canton of Fribourg
- Coordinates: 46°37′N 6°53′E
- Country: Switzerland
- Canton: Fribourg
- District: Veveyse

Government
  - Mayor: Syndic

Area
  - Total: 9.54 km^{2} (3.68 sq mi)
- Elevation: 813 m (2,667 ft)

Population (December 2020)
  - Total: 1,223
  - Density: 128/km^{2} (332/sq mi)
- Time zone: UTC+01:00 (CET)
  - Summer (DST): UTC+02:00 (CEST)
- Postal code: 1699
- SFOS number: 2337
- ISO 3166 code: CH-FR
- Surrounded by: Chapelle (Glâne), Chesalles-sur-Oron (VD), La Verrerie, Rue, Saint-Martin, Siviriez, Ursy, Vuisternens-devant-Romont
- Website: www.leflon.ch

Le Flon is a municipality in the district of Veveyse in the canton of Fribourg in Switzerland. It was created in 2004 through the merger of Bouloz, Pont (Veveyse) and Porsel.

== Geography ==
Le Flon has an area of 9.57 km^{2} (3.69 sq mi). Of this area, 7.04 km^{2} (2.72 mi^{2}) or 73.5% is used for agricultural purposes, while 1.91 km^{2} (0.74 mi^{2}) or 19.9% is forested. Of the rest of the land, 0.53 km^{2} (0.20 mi^{2}) or 5.5% is settled (buildings or roads), 0.01 km^{2} (2.5 acres) or 0.1% is either rivers or lakes and 0.05 km^{2} (12 acres) or 0.5% is unproductive land.

Of the built up area, housing and buildings made up 2.3% and transportation infrastructure made up 2.6%. Out of the forested land, 18.7% of the total land area is heavily forested and 1.3% is covered with orchards or small clusters of trees. Of the agricultural land, 13.7% is used for growing crops and 58.7% is pastures, while 1.1% is used for orchards or vine crops. All the water in the municipality is flowing water.

The municipality is located in the Veveyse district.

== Demographics ==
Le Flon has a population (as of December 2020) of 1,223. As of 2008, 6.6% of the population are resident foreign nationals. Over the last 10 years (2000–2010) the population has changed at a rate of 26.2%. Migration accounted for 21%, while births and deaths accounted for 6.6%.

Most of the population (as of 2000) speaks French (95.3%) as their first language, German is the second most common (2.4%) and Portuguese is the third (0.8%).

As of 2008, the population was 52.3% male and 47.7% female. The population was made up of 502 Swiss men (48.9% of the population) and 35 (3.4%) non-Swiss men. There were 448 Swiss women (43.6%) and 42 (4.1%) non-Swiss women. As of 2000, children and teenagers (0–19 years old) make up 30.2% of the population, while adults (20–64 years old) make up 56.3% and seniors (over 64 years old) make up 13.5%.

As of 2009, the construction rate of new housing units was 6.7 new units per 1000 residents.

== Politics ==
In the 2011 federal election the most popular party was the SVP which received 25.1% of the vote. The next three most popular parties were the SPS (25.0%), the CVP (24.6%) and the FDP (8.8%).

The SVP lost about 5.1% of the vote when compared to the 2007 Federal election (30.2% in 2007 vs 25.1% in 2011). The SPS moved from third in 2007 (with 23.7%) to second in 2011, the CVP moved from second in 2007 (with 26.4%) to third and the FDP retained about the same popularity (8.6% in 2007). A total of 319 votes were cast in this election, of which 6 or 1.9% were invalid.

== Economy ==
As of 2010, Le Flon had an unemployment rate of 3.7%. As of 2008, there were 77 people employed in the primary economic sector and about 32 businesses involved in this sector. 27 people were employed in the secondary sector and there were 11 businesses in this sector. 43 people were employed in the tertiary sector, with 20 businesses in this sector.

In 2008 the total number of full-time equivalent jobs was 115. The number of jobs in the primary sector was 57, all of which were in agriculture. The number of jobs in the secondary sector was 25 of which 7 or (28.0%) were in manufacturing and 17 (68.0%) were in construction. The number of jobs in the tertiary sector was 33. In the tertiary sector; 16 or 48.5% were in wholesale or retail sales or the repair of motor vehicles, 2 or 6.1% were in the movement and storage of goods, 3 or 9.1% were in a hotel or restaurant, 1 was a technical professional or scientist, 8 or 24.2% were in education and 1 was in health care.

Of the working population, 7% used public transportation to get to work, and 63.9% used a private car.

== Education ==
The Canton of Fribourg school system provides one year of non-obligatory Kindergarten, followed by six years of Primary school. This is followed by three years of obligatory lower Secondary school where the students are separated according to ability and aptitude. Following the lower Secondary students may attend a three or four year optional upper Secondary school. The upper Secondary school is divided into gymnasium (university preparatory) and vocational programs. After they finish the upper Secondary program, students may choose to attend a Tertiary school or continue their apprenticeship.

During the 2010–11 school year, there were a total of 114 students attending 6 classes in Le Flon. A total of 206 students from the municipality attended any school, either in the municipality or outside of it. There was one kindergarten class with a total of 15 students in the municipality. The municipality had 5 primary classes and 99 students. During the same year, there were no lower secondary classes in the municipality, but 52 students attended lower secondary school in a neighboring municipality. There were no upper secondary classes or vocational classes, but there were 22 upper Secondary students and 12 upper Secondary vocational students who attended classes in another municipality. The municipality had no non-university Tertiary classes, but there were 2 non-university Tertiary students and 3 specialized Tertiary students who attended classes in another municipality.
