= Besencens =

Former municipality, canton of Fribourg

- Former municipality
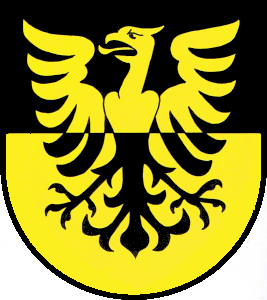
- Coat of arms
- Location of Besencens
- Location within Switzerland Location within Canton of Fribourg
- Coordinates: 46.583333°N 6.866661°E
- Country: Switzerland
- Canton: Fribourg
- District: Veveyse
- Municipality: Saint-Martin

Population (2000)
  - Total: 151
- Time zone: UTC+01:00 (CET)
  - Summer (DST): UTC+02:00 (CEST)
- ISO 3166 code: CH-FR
- Website

Besencens is a former municipality in the Veveyse district of the canton of Fribourg, Switzerland. Since 2004 it has been part of the municipality of Saint-Martin. It is a scattered settlement on a rise north-east of Oron.

== History ==
Besencens is first mentioned in 1170 as Besencens. It was part of the lordship of Oron and, when the Oron family died out in 1388, became a possession of the counts of Gruyère. Besencens remained Catholic at the time of the Reformation and came under the suzerainty of Fribourg in 1554. It belonged to the bailiwick of Rue until 1798 and then to the district of Rue until 1848.

Besencens and Fiaugères, which also became part of Saint-Martin in 2004, formed a single municipality until they separated in 1763; the burghers of that time and their descendants nevertheless kept their citizenship rights in both municipalities. Besencens belongs to the parish of Saint-Martin. The first school was built in 1839. Livestock farming is still the main activity: in 1990, 62% of the working population was employed in the primary sector.

Besencens had 126 inhabitants in 1811, 164 in 1850, 173 in 1870, 154 in 1900, 140 in 1950, 95 in 1980 and 151 in 2000. In 2004 it became part of the municipality of Saint-Martin.

== Bibliography ==
- A. Dellion, Dictionnaire historique et statistique des paroisses catholiques du canton de Fribourg, vol. 11, pp. 34–36
