= La Verrerie =

- Municipality
- Coat of arms
- Location of La Verrerie
- Location within Switzerland Location within Canton of Fribourg
- Coordinates: 46°37′N 6°55′E
- Country: Switzerland
- Canton: Fribourg
- District: Veveyse

Government
  - Mayor: Syndic

Area
  - Total: 13.42 km^{2} (5.18 sq mi)
- Elevation: 915 m (3,002 ft)

Population (December 2020)
  - Total: 1,301
  - Density: 96.94/km^{2} (251.1/sq mi)
- Time zone: UTC+01:00 (CET)
  - Summer (DST): UTC+02:00 (CEST)
- Postal codes: 1624 La Verrerie; 1611 Le Crêt
- SFOS number: 2338
- ISO 3166 code: CH-FR
- Surrounded by: Le Flon, Saint-Martin, Sâles, Semsales, Vuisternens-devant-Romont
- Website: www.laverrerie.ch

La Verrerie (French: [la vɛʁ(ə)ʁi]; Arpitan: La Vèrriére [la vɛˈʁjeʁ(ə)] is a municipality in the district of Veveyse in the canton of Fribourg in Switzerland. It was formed on 1 January 2004 by the union of the municipalities of Le Crêt, Grattavache, and Progens. The municipality is administered from Le Crêt.

== Geography ==
La Verrerie has an area of 13.43 km^{2} (5.19 sq mi). Of this area, 10.46 km^{2} (4.04 mi^{2}) or 78.2% is used for agricultural purposes, while 1.97 km^{2} (0.76 mi^{2}) or 14.7% is forested. Of the rest of the land, 0.88 km^{2} (0.34 mi^{2}) or 6.6% is settled (buildings or roads), 0.04 km^{2} (9.9 acres) or 0.3% is either rivers or lakes and 0.07 km^{2} (17 acres) or 0.5% is unproductive land.

Of the built-up area, housing and buildings made up 3.5% and transportation infrastructure made up 2.8%. Out of the forested land, all of the forested land area is covered with heavy forests. Of the agricultural land, 10.2% is used for growing crops and 67.6% is pastures. All the water in the municipality is flowing water.

== Demographics ==
La Verrerie has a population (as of December 2020) of 1,301. As of 2008, 9.4% of the population are resident foreign nationals. Over the last 10 years (2000–2010) the population has changed at a rate of 22.5%. Migration accounted for 14.7%, while births and deaths accounted for 6.9%.

Most of the population (as of 2000) speaks French (95.2%) as their first language, Portuguese is the second most common (1.6%) and German is the third (1.0%).

As of 2008, the population was 50.1% male and 49.9% female. The population was made up of 475 Swiss men (45.0% of the population) and 54 (5.1%) non-Swiss men. There were 474 Swiss women (44.9%) and 53 (5.0%) non-Swiss women. As of 2000, children and teenagers (0–19 years old) make up 28% of the population, while adults (20–64 years old) make up 59.5% and seniors (over 64 years old) make up 12.5%.

As of 2009, the construction rate of new housing units was 2.8 new units per 1000 residents. The vacancy rate for the municipality, in 2010, was 0.93%.

== Heritage sites of national significance ==
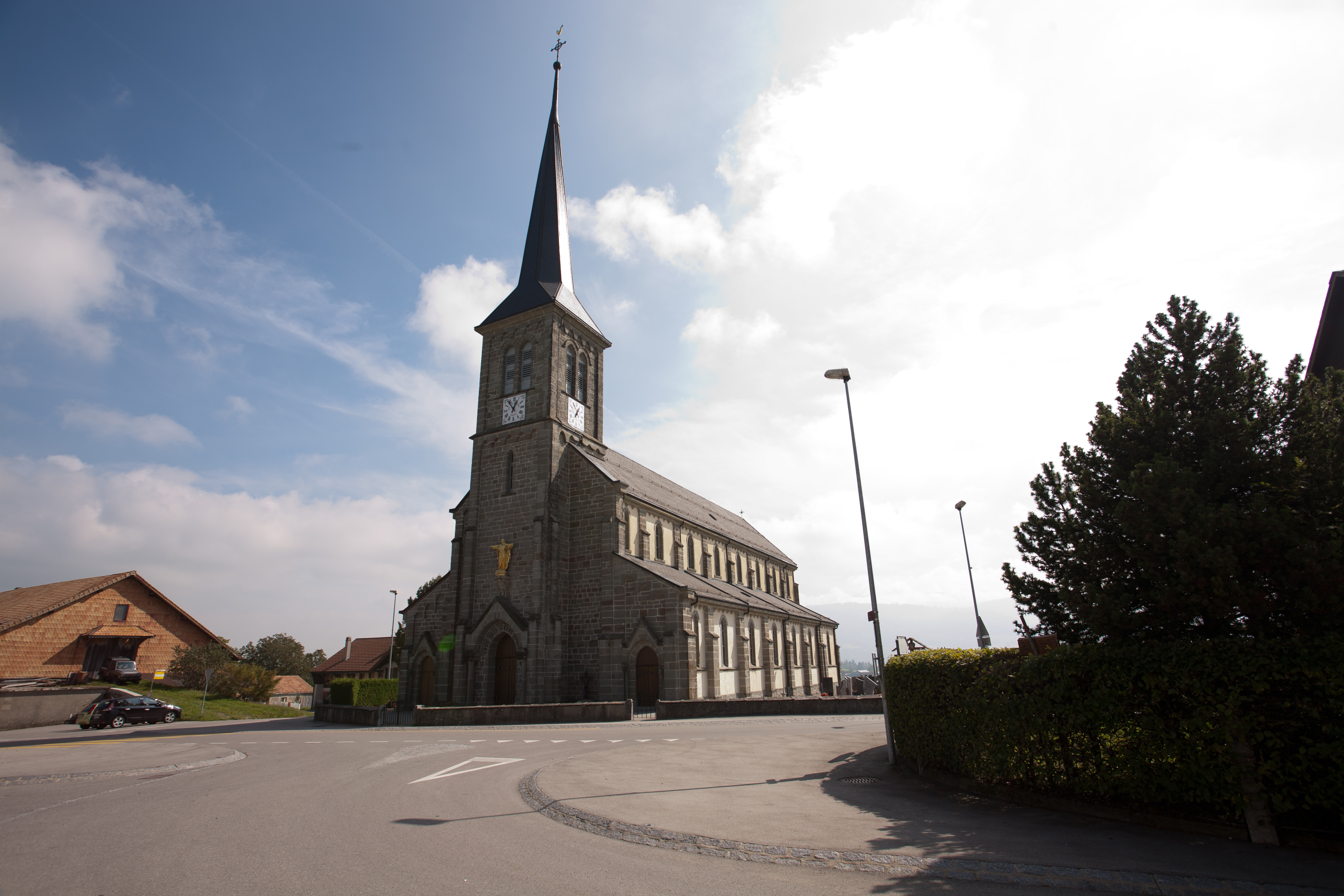
Church of Saint-Loup

The Church of Saint-Loup is listed as a Swiss heritage site of national significance.

== Politics ==
In the 2011 federal election the most popular party was the SVP which received 30.9% of the vote. The next three most popular parties were the CVP (22.2%), the SPS (21.1%) and the FDP (11.5%).

The SVP received about the same percentage of the vote as they did in the 2007 Federal election (32.1% in 2007 vs 30.9% in 2011). The CVP lost popularity (31.5% in 2007), the SPS gained popularity (15.7% in 2007) and the FDP retained about the same popularity (11.7% in 2007). A total of 346 votes were cast in this election, of which 5 or 1.4% were invalid.

== Economy ==
As of 2010, La Verrerie had an unemployment rate of 1.9%. As of 2008, there were 104 people employed in the primary economic sector and about 41 businesses involved in this sector. 110 people were employed in the secondary sector and there were 13 businesses in this sector. 54 people were employed in the tertiary sector, with 18 businesses in this sector.

In 2008 the total number of full-time equivalent jobs was 230. The number of jobs in the primary sector was 82, all of which were in agriculture. The number of jobs in the secondary sector was 105 of which 37 or (35.2%) were in manufacturing and 69 (65.7%) were in construction. The number of jobs in the tertiary sector was 43. In the tertiary sector; 23 or 53.5% were in wholesale or retail sales or the repair of motor vehicles, 2 or 4.7% were in the movement and storage of goods, 3 or 7.0% were in a hotel or restaurant, 3 or 7.0% were the insurance or financial industry, 1 was a technical professional or scientist, 6 or 14.0% were in education.

Of the working population, 5.2% used public transportation to get to work, and 62.6% used a private car.

== Education ==
The Canton of Fribourg school system provides one year of non-obligatory Kindergarten, followed by six years of Primary school. This is followed by three years of obligatory lower Secondary school where the students are separated according to ability and aptitude. Following the lower Secondary students may attend a three or four year optional upper Secondary school. The upper Secondary school is divided into gymnasium (university preparatory) and vocational programs. After they finish the upper Secondary program, students may choose to attend a Tertiary school or continue their apprenticeship.

During the 2010-11 school year, there were a total of 107 students attending 6 classes in La Verrerie. A total of 216 students from the municipality attended any school, either in the municipality or outside of it. There was one kindergarten class with a total of 14 students in the municipality. The municipality had 5 primary classes and 93 students. During the same year, there were no lower secondary classes in the municipality, but 51 students attended lower secondary school in a neighboring municipality. There were no upper Secondary classes or vocational classes, but there were 6 upper Secondary students and 49 upper Secondary vocational students who attended classes in another municipality. The municipality had no non-university Tertiary classes, but there were 3 non-university Tertiary students who attended classes in another municipality.
