= Châtel-Saint-Denis =

- Municipality
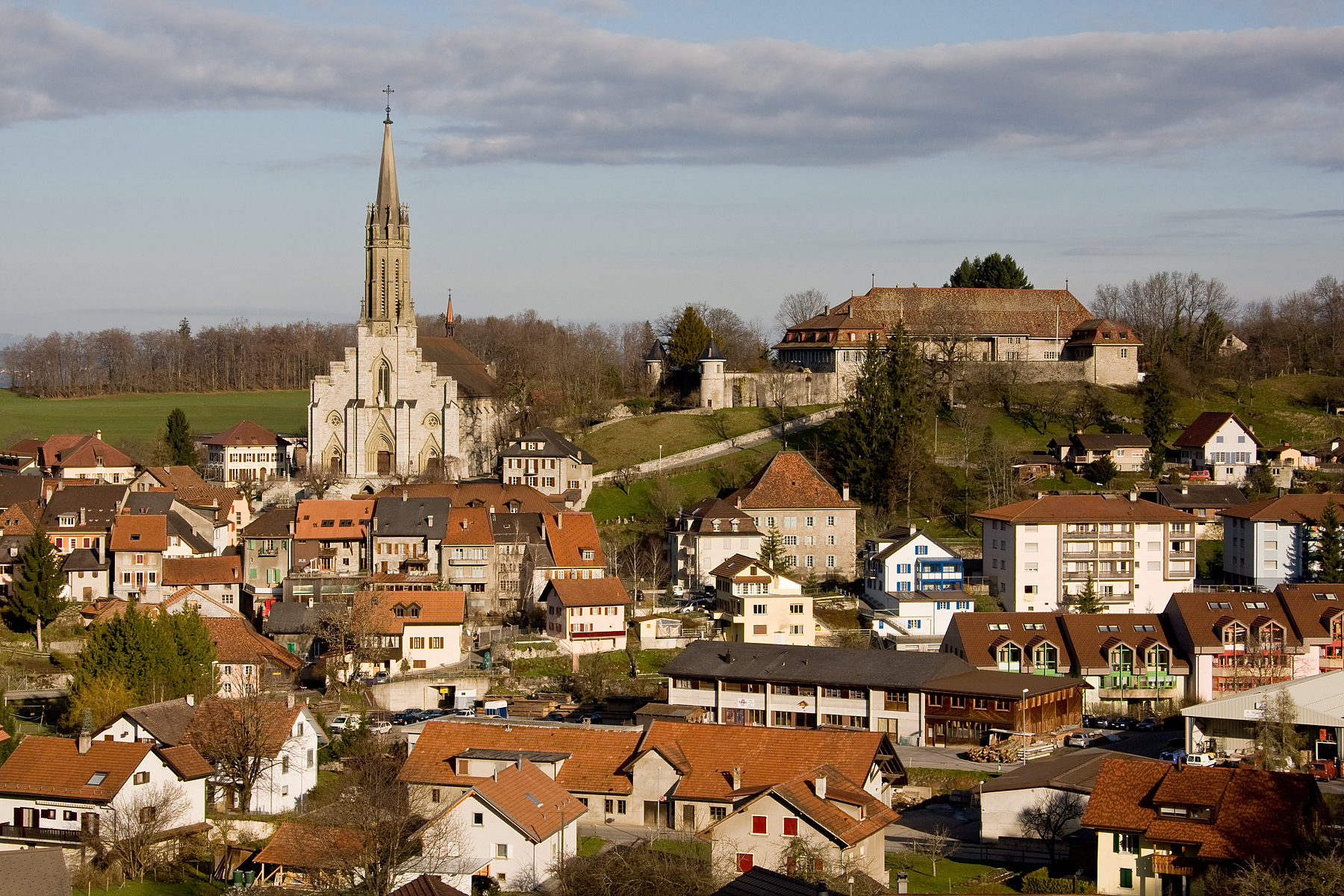

- Flag Coat of arms
- Location of Châtel-Saint-Denis
- Location within Switzerland Location within Canton of Fribourg
- Coordinates: 46°32′N 6°54′E
- Country: Switzerland
- Canton: Fribourg
- District: Veveyse

Government
  - Mayor: Syndic

Area
  - Total: 47.9 km^{2} (18.5 sq mi)
- Elevation: 809 m (2,654 ft)

Population (December 2020)
  - Total: 7,449
  - Density: 156/km^{2} (403/sq mi)
- Time zone: UTC+01:00 (CET)
  - Summer (DST): UTC+02:00 (CEST)
- Postal code: 1618
- SFOS number: 2325
- ISO 3166 code: CH-FR
- Surrounded by: Blonay (VD), Corsier-sur-Vevey (VD), Haut-Intyamon(FR), Maracon (VD), Remaufens(FR), Saint-Légier-La Chiésaz (VD), Semsales(FR)
- Website: www.chatel-st-denis.ch

Châtel-Saint-Denis (French: [ʃɑtɛl sɛ̃ d(ə)ni]; Arpitan: Châtél, locally Tsathi [tsaˈθi], or Châtél-Sent-Denis, locally Tsathi-Chin-Dèni) is a municipality and district capital of the district of Veveyse in the canton of Fribourg in Switzerland.

== Geography ==
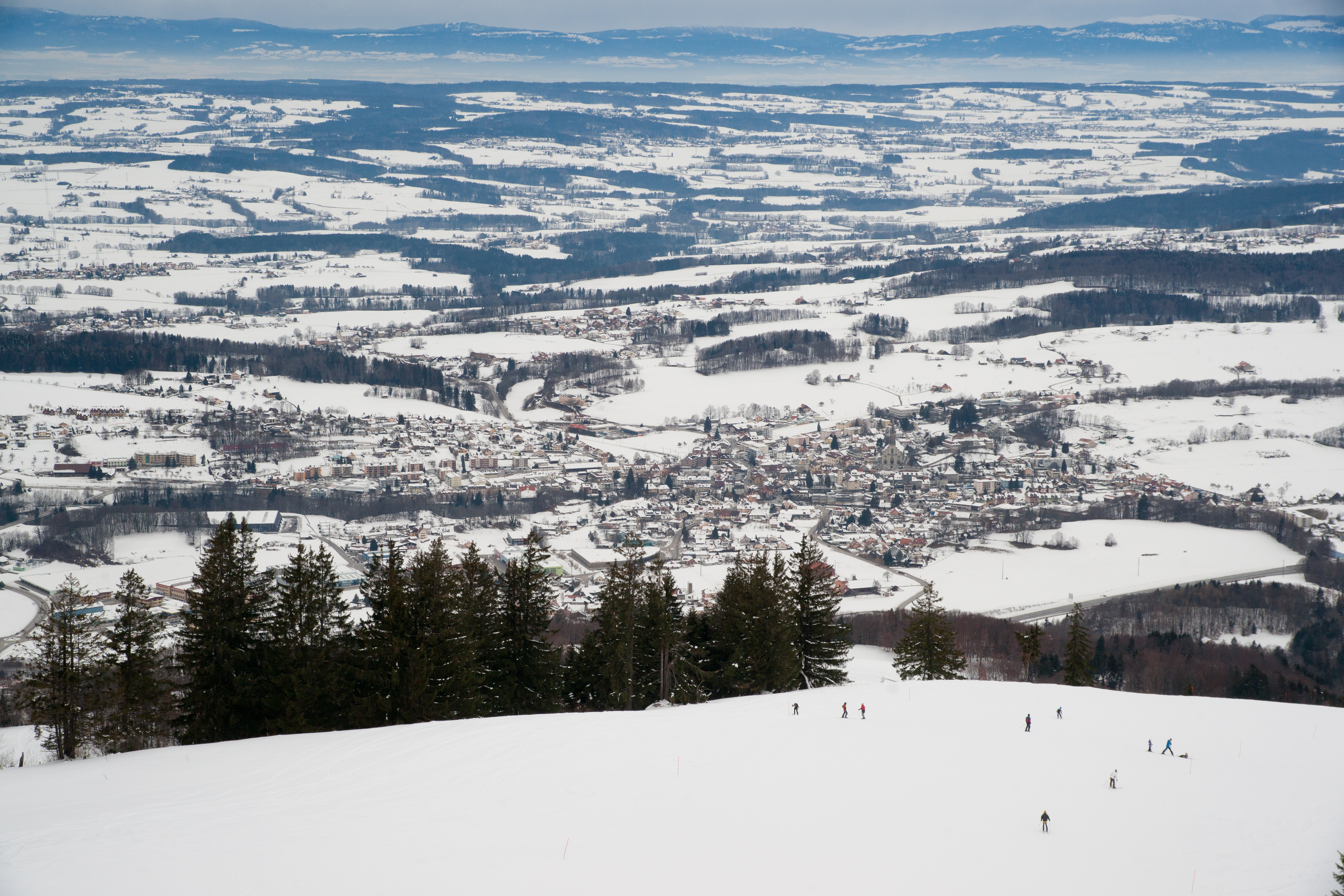
Châtel-Saint-Denis and surroundings

Aerial view (1962)

Châtel-Saint-Denis has an area of 47.93 km^{2} (18.51 sq mi). Of this area, 22.37 km^{2} (8.64 mi^{2}) or 46.7% is used for agricultural purposes, while 20.26 km^{2} (7.82 mi^{2}) or 42.3% is forested. Of the rest of the land, 3.33 km^{2} (1.29 mi^{2}) or 7.0% is settled (buildings or roads), 0.27 km^{2} (0.10 mi^{2}) or 0.6% is either rivers or lakes and 1.65 km^{2} (0.64 mi^{2}) or 3.4% is unproductive land.

Of the built up area, housing and buildings made up 3.3% and transportation infrastructure made up 2.5%. Out of the forested land, 38.4% of the total land area is heavily forested and 3.8% is covered with orchards or small clusters of trees. Of the agricultural land, 2.1% is used for growing crops and 17.0% is pastures and 27.5% is used for alpine pastures. All the water in the municipality is flowing water.

The capital of the Veveyse district is located on the banks of the Veveyse river, on the Bulle-Vevey road. It consists of the village of Châtel-Saint-Denis, the ski and hiking areas of Les Paccots and Fruence and a number of hamlets. The large municipality includes the Lac de Lussy and Lac des Joncs nature preserves.

== Coat of arms ==
The blazon of the municipal coat of arms is Or an Eagle displayed Sable.

== Demographics ==
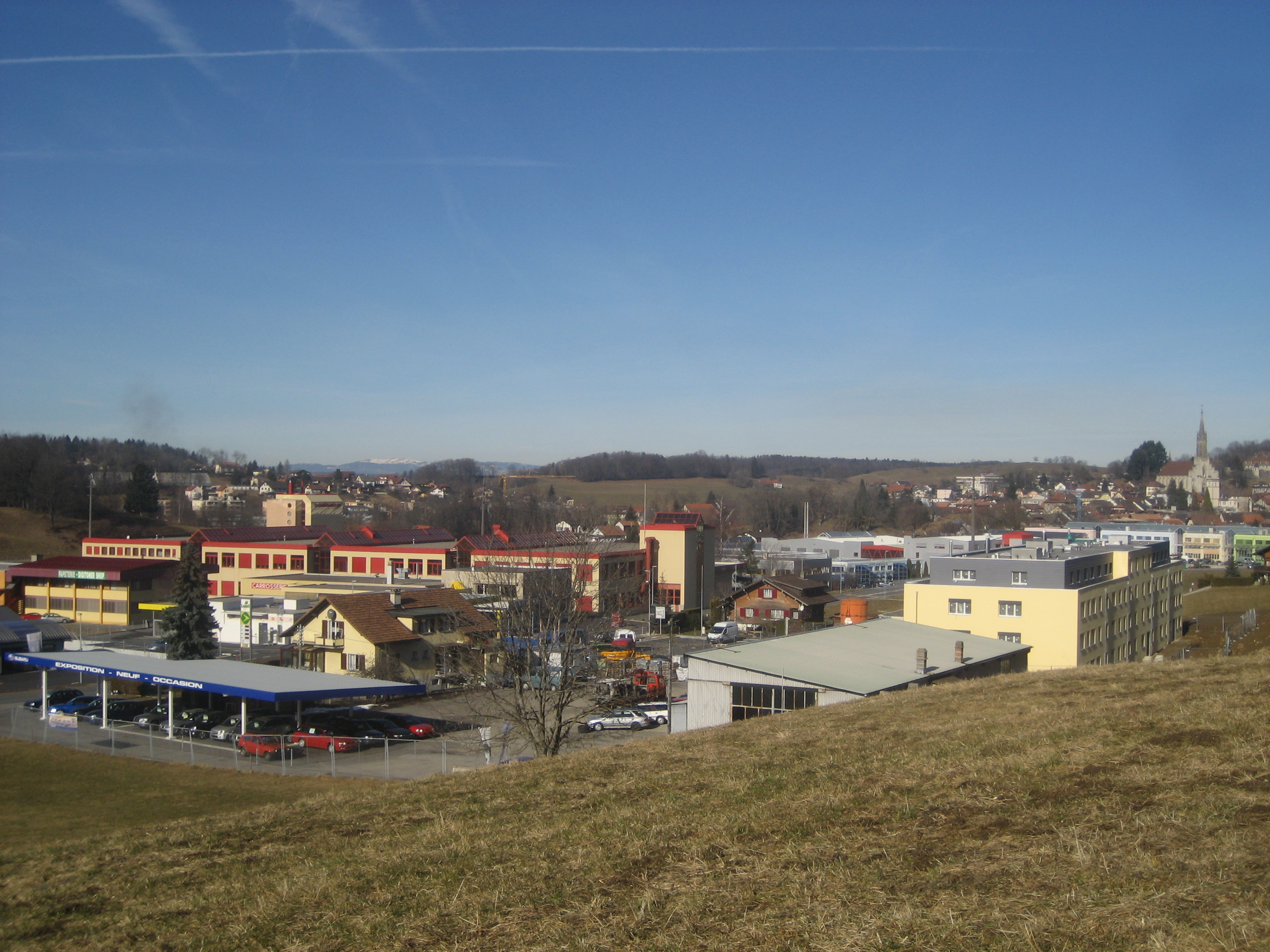
New development around Châtel-Saint-Denis

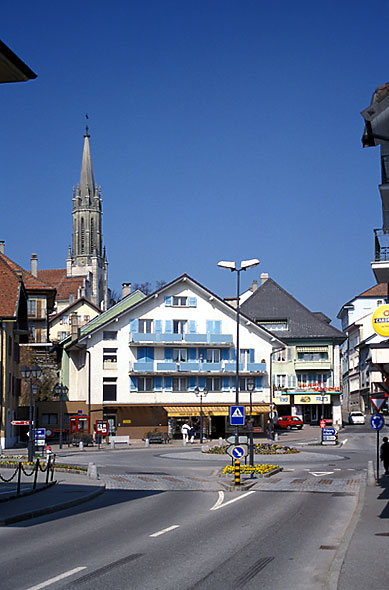
Roundabout in Châtel-Saint-Denis

Châtel-Saint-Denis has a population (as of December 2020) of 7,449. As of 2008, 23.1% of the population are resident foreign nationals. Over the last 10 years (2000–2010) the population has changed at a rate of 36.2%. Migration accounted for 28.6%, while births and deaths accounted for 3.5%.

Most of the population (as of 2000) speaks French (3,909 or 89.1%) as their first language, Portuguese is the second most common (193 or 4.4%) and German is the third (118 or 2.7%). There are 34 people who speak Italian.

As of 2008, the population was 50.5% male and 49.5% female. The population was made up of 2,110 Swiss men (37.3% of the population) and 743 (13.1%) non-Swiss men. There were 2,178 Swiss women (38.5%) and 622 (11.0%) non-Swiss women. Of the population in the municipality, 1,634 or about 37.2% were born in Châtel-Saint-Denis and lived there in 2000. There were 759 or 17.3% who were born in the same canton, while 1,000 or 22.8% were born somewhere else in Switzerland, and 808 or 18.4% were born outside of Switzerland.

As of 2000, children and teenagers (0–19 years old) make up 25.1% of the population, while adults (20–64 years old) make up 61.4% and seniors (over 64 years old) make up 13.5%.

As of 2000, there were 1,790 people who were single and never married in the municipality. There were 2,084 married individuals, 258 widows or widowers and 257 individuals who are divorced.

As of 2000, there were 1,826 private households in the municipality, and an average of 2.3 persons per household. There were 638 households that consist of only one person and 103 households with five or more people. In 2000, a total of 1,756 apartments (72.5% of the total) were permanently occupied, while 549 apartments (22.7%) were seasonally occupied and 117 apartments (4.8%) were empty. As of 2009, the construction rate of new housing units was 9.2 new units per 1000 residents. The vacancy rate for the municipality, in 2010, was 0.14%.

The historical population is given in the following chart:

== Heritage sites of national significance ==
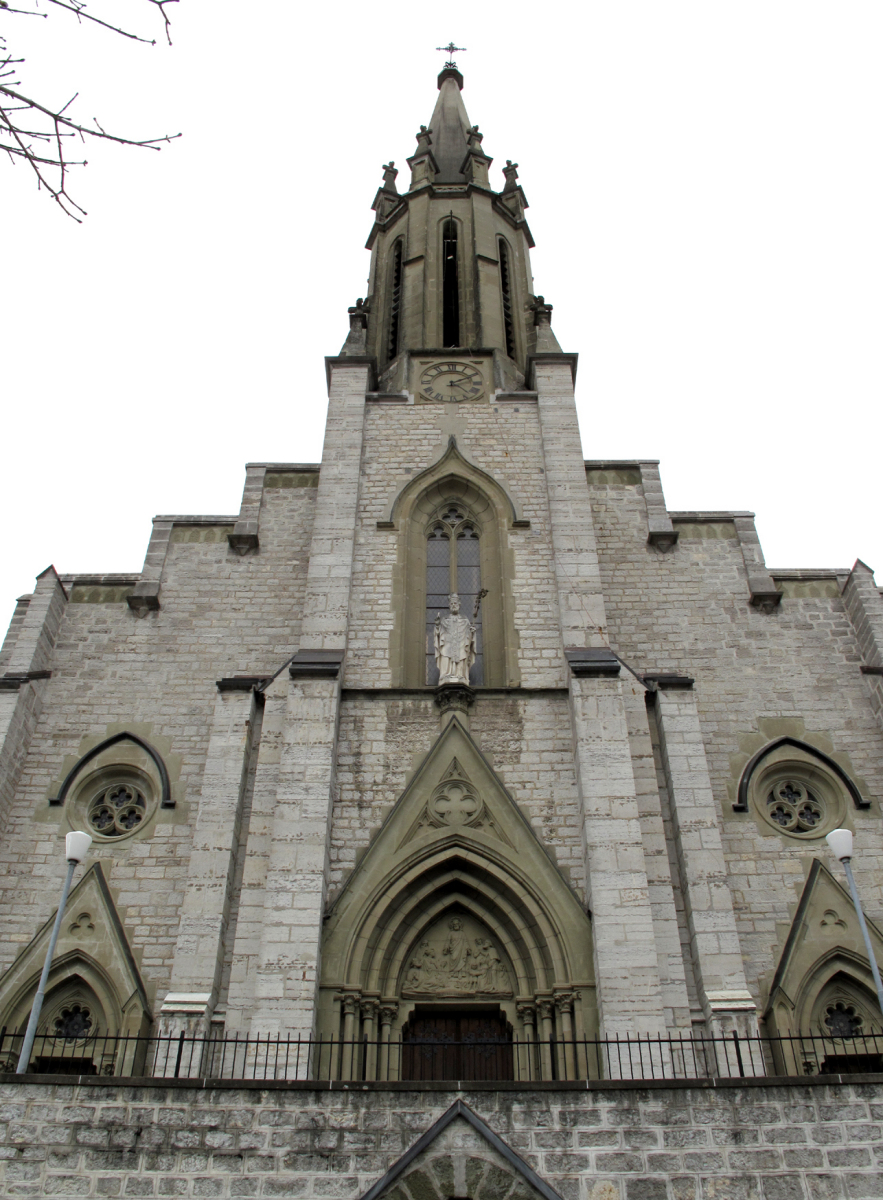
Saint-Denis Church

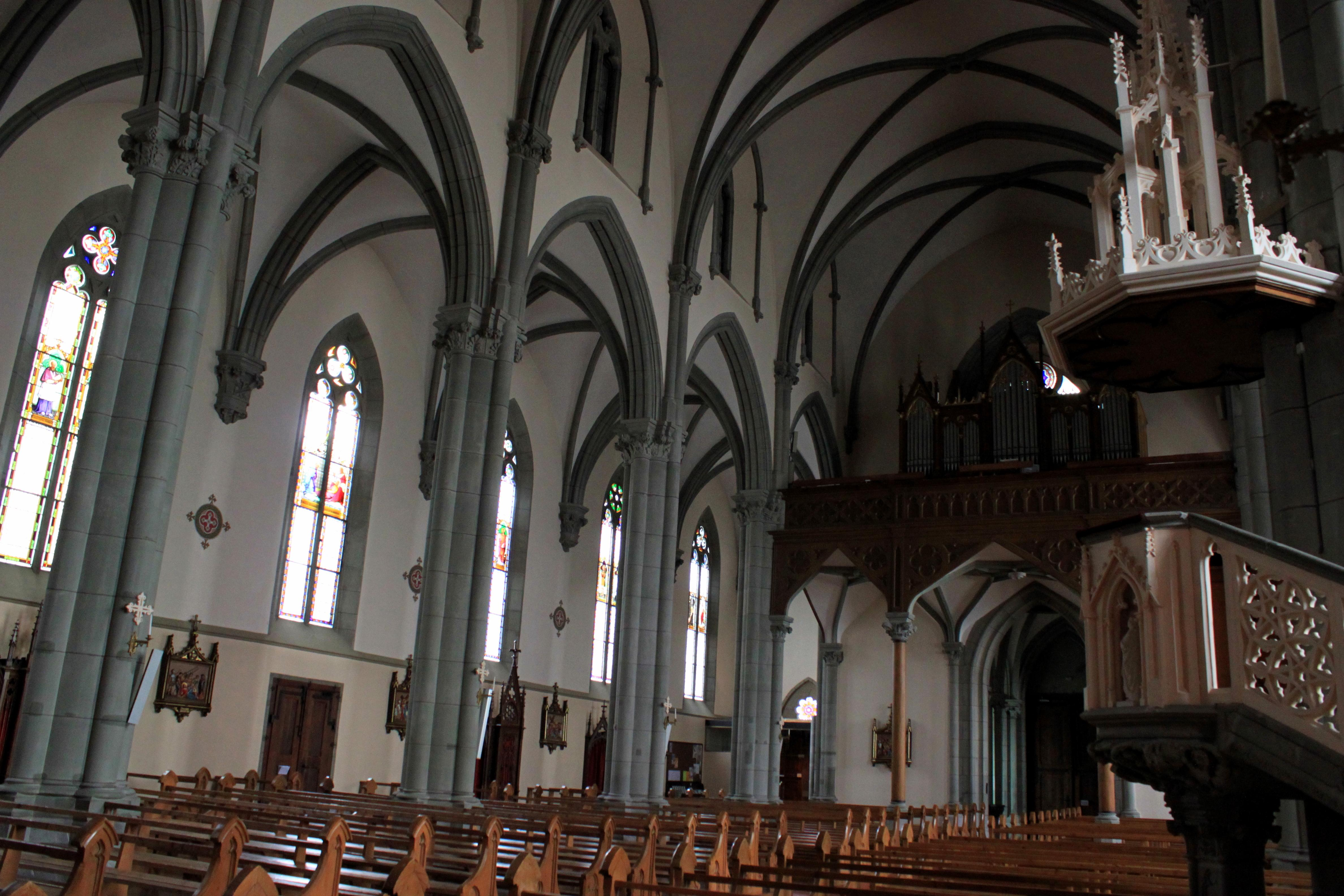
Interior of the church

The Saint-Denis Church is listed as a Swiss heritage site of national significance. The entire village of Châtel-Saint-Denis and the hamlet of Prayoud are part of the Inventory of Swiss Heritage Sites.

== Politics ==
In the 2011 federal election the most popular party was the SVP which received 30.5% of the vote. The next three most popular parties were the SPS (29.1%), the CVP (17.3%) and the FDP (9.1%).

The SVP received about the same percentage of the vote as they did in the 2007 Federal election (34.0% in 2007 vs 30.5% in 2011). The SPS retained about the same popularity (24.1% in 2007), the CVP retained about the same popularity (21.6% in 2007) and the FDP retained about the same popularity (11.4% in 2007). A total of 1,490 votes were cast in this election, of which 17 or 1.1% were invalid.

== Economy ==
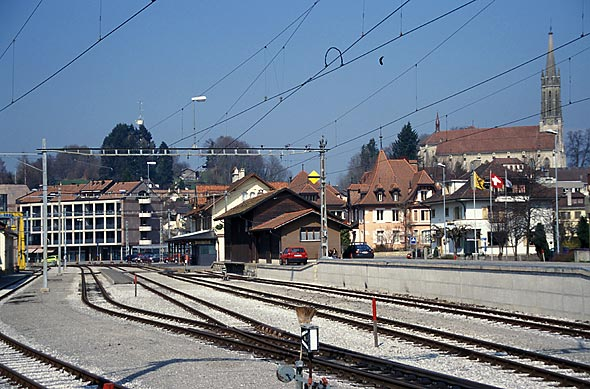
Châtel-Saint-Denis train station

As of 2010, Châtel-Saint-Denis had an unemployment rate of 3.6%. As of 2008, there were 123 people employed in the primary economic sector and about 45 businesses involved in this sector. 984 people were employed in the secondary sector and there were 73 businesses in this sector. 1,728 people were employed in the tertiary sector, with 236 businesses in this sector. There were 2,261 residents of the municipality who were employed in some capacity, of which females made up 42.2% of the workforce.

In 2008 the total number of full-time equivalent jobs was 2,426. The number of jobs in the primary sector was 99, of which 82 were in agriculture and 17 were in forestry or lumber production. The number of jobs in the secondary sector was 924 of which 658 or (71.2%) were in manufacturing and 240 (26.0%) were in construction. The number of jobs in the tertiary sector was 1,403. In the tertiary sector; 345 or 24.6% were in wholesale or retail sales or the repair of motor vehicles, 43 or 3.1% were in the movement and storage of goods, 119 or 8.5% were in a hotel or restaurant, 157 or 11.2% were in the information industry, 25 or 1.8% were the insurance or financial industry, 123 or 8.8% were technical professionals or scientists, 82 or 5.8% were in education and 279 or 19.9% were in health care.

In 2000, there were 1,223 workers who commuted into the municipality and 1,145 workers who commuted away. The municipality is a net importer of workers, with about 1.1 workers entering the municipality for every one leaving. Of the working population, 9.1% used public transportation to get to work, and 66.6% used a private car.

== Religion ==
From the 2000 census, 3,148 or 71.7% were Roman Catholic, while 514 or 11.7% belonged to the Swiss Reformed Church. Of the rest of the population, there were 21 members of an Orthodox church (or about 0.48% of the population), there were 5 individuals (or about 0.11% of the population) who belonged to the Christian Catholic Church, and there were 72 individuals (or about 1.64% of the population) who belonged to another Christian church. There were 2 individuals (or about 0.05% of the population) who were Jewish, and 142 (or about 3.24% of the population) who were Islamic. There were 6 individuals who were Buddhist, 1 person who was Hindu and 3 individuals who belonged to another church. 285 (or about 6.49% of the population) belonged to no church, are agnostic or atheist, and 222 individuals (or about 5.06% of the population) did not answer the question.

== Education ==
In Châtel-Saint-Denis about 1,390 or (31.7%) of the population have completed non-mandatory upper secondary education, and 437 or (10.0%) have completed additional higher education (either university or a Fachhochschule). Of the 437 who completed tertiary schooling, 59.3% were Swiss men, 22.9% were Swiss women, 10.5% were non-Swiss men and 7.3% were non-Swiss women.

The Canton of Fribourg school system provides one year of non-obligatory Kindergarten, followed by six years of Primary school. This is followed by three years of obligatory lower Secondary school where the students are separated according to ability and aptitude. Following the lower Secondary students may attend a three or four year optional upper Secondary school. The upper Secondary school is divided into gymnasium (university preparatory) and vocational programs. After they finish the upper Secondary program, students may choose to attend a Tertiary school or continue their apprenticeship.

During the 2010-11 school year, there were a total of 1,217 students attending 62 classes in Châtel-Saint-Denis. A total of 905 students from the municipality attended any school, either in the municipality or outside of it. There were 6 kindergarten classes with a total of 104 students in the municipality. The municipality had 22 primary classes and 422 students. During the same year, there were 32 lower secondary classes with a total of 660 students. There was one upper Secondary class, with 20 upper Secondary students. The municipality had one special Tertiary class, with 11 specialized Tertiary students.

As of 2000, there were 375 students in Châtel-Saint-Denis who came from another municipality, while 112 residents attended schools outside the municipality.

== Notable people ==
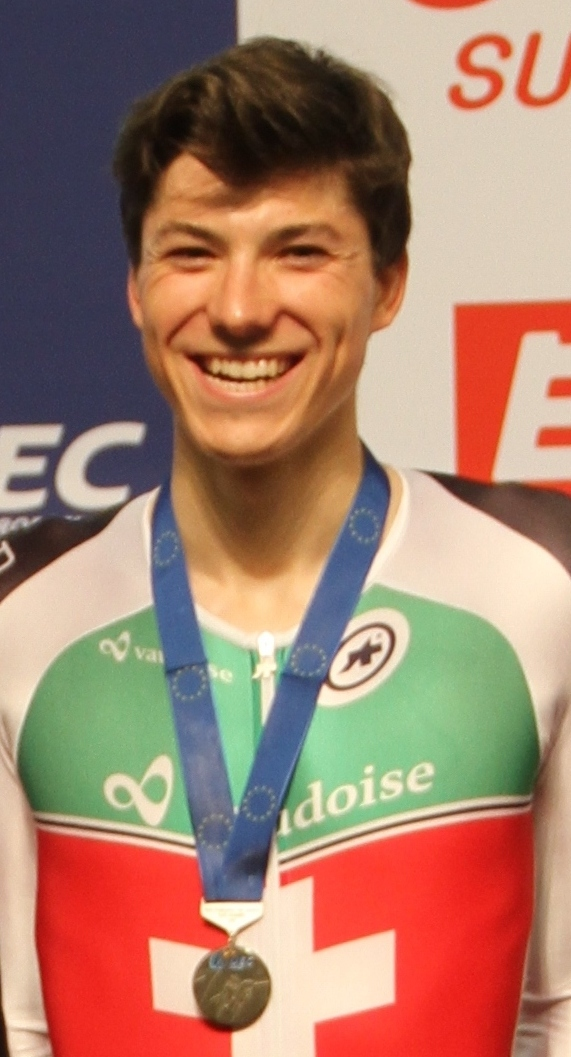
Frank Pasche, 2015

- Oswald Pilloud (1873–1946), a Swiss painter and illustrator
- Charles Berthoud (born 1938), a Swiss wrestler, competed in the Greco-Roman middleweight at the 1960 Summer Olympics
- Bernard Genoud (1942–2010), Bishop of the Roman Catholic Diocese of Lausanne, Geneva and Fribourg 1999-2010
- Thérèse Meyer (born 1948), a Swiss politician, member of the Swiss National Council and President of the National Council for 2005.
- Alexandre Imperatori (born 1987), a Swiss racing driver, he lives in Shanghai, China.
- Luca Aerni (born 1993), a Swiss alpine skier, competed at the 2014 Winter Olympics
- Frank Pasche (born 1993), a Swiss professional racing cyclist
- Alexis Monney (born 2000), a Swiss alpine skier, competed at the 2026 Winter Olympics
