= Remaufens =

- Municipality
- Flag Coat of arms
- Location of Remaufens
- Location within Switzerland Location within Canton of Fribourg
- Coordinates: 46°31′N 6°52′E
- Country: Switzerland
- Canton: Fribourg
- District: Veveyse

Government
  - Mayor: Syndic

Area
  - Total: 5.9 km^{2} (2.3 sq mi)
- Elevation: 789 m (2,589 ft)

Population (December 2020)
  - Total: 1,212
  - Density: 210/km^{2} (530/sq mi)
- Time zone: UTC+01:00 (CET)
  - Summer (DST): UTC+02:00 (CEST)
- Postal code: 1617
- SFOS number: 2333
- ISO 3166 code: CH-FR
- Surrounded by: Attalens(FR), Châtel-Saint-Denis(FR), Corsier-sur-Vevey (VD), Ecoteaux (VD), Maracon (VD)
- Website: www.remaufens.ch

Remaufens (Arpitan: Remofens [ʁəmoˈfɛ̃]) is a municipality in the district of Veveyse in the canton of Fribourg in Switzerland.

== History ==
Remaufens is first mentioned about 1000 as Romulfens.

== Geography ==
Remaufens has an area of 5.91 km^{2} (2.28 sq mi). Of this area, 3.99 km^{2} (1.54 mi^{2}) or 67.5% is used for agricultural purposes, while 1.49 km^{2} (0.58 mi^{2}) or 25.2% is forested. Of the rest of the land, 0.39 km^{2} (0.15 mi^{2}) or 6.6% is settled (buildings or roads), 0.02 km^{2} (4.9 acres) or 0.3% is either rivers or lakes.

Of the built up area, housing and buildings made up 3.7% and transportation infrastructure made up 1.9%. Out of the forested land, 23.2% of the total land area is heavily forested and 2.0% is covered with orchards or small clusters of trees. Of the agricultural land, 9.0% is used for growing crops and 57.9% is pastures. All the water in the municipality is flowing water.

The municipality is located in the Veveyse district, on a hill along the Châtel-Saint-Denis-Palézieux road.

== Coat of arms ==
The blazon of the municipal coat of arms is Per fess Or a Semi Eagle issuant displayed Sable and Gules a Cross bottony Argent.

== Demographics ==
Remaufens has a population (as of December 2020) of 1,212. As of 2008, 11.7% of the population are resident foreign nationals. Over the last 10 years (2000–2010) the population has changed at a rate of 19%. Migration accounted for 15.2%, while births and deaths accounted for 5.6%.

Most of the population (as of 2000) speaks French (705 or 94.8%) as their first language, English is the second most common (10 or 1.3%) and German is the third (8 or 1.1%). There are 3 people who speak Italian.

As of 2008, the population was 48.9% male and 51.1% female. The population was made up of 373 Swiss men (41.9% of the population) and 62 (7.0%) non-Swiss men. There were 403 Swiss women (45.3%) and 52 (5.8%) non-Swiss women. Of the population in the municipality, 293 or about 39.4% were born in Remaufens and lived there in 2000. There were 188 or 25.3% who were born in the same canton, while 153 or 20.6% were born somewhere else in Switzerland, and 82 or 11.0% were born outside of Switzerland.

As of 2000, children and teenagers (0–19 years old) make up 29.3% of the population, while adults (20–64 years old) make up 58.6% and seniors (over 64 years old) make up 12.1%.

As of 2000, there were 311 people who were single and never married in the municipality. There were 369 married individuals, 37 widows or widowers and 27 individuals who are divorced.

As of 2000, there were 274 private households in the municipality, and an average of 2.7 persons per household. There were 63 households that consist of only one person and 28 households with five or more people. In 2000, a total of 264 apartments (95.7% of the total) were permanently occupied, while 6 apartments (2.2%) were seasonally occupied and 6 apartments (2.2%) were empty. As of 2009, the construction rate of new housing units was 1.1 new units per 1000 residents.

Historical population

Year	Pop.	±%
1811	271	—
1850	356	+31.4%
1860	403	+13.2%
1870	433	+7.4%
1880	437	+0.9%

Year	Pop.	±%
1888	405	−7.3%
1900	411	+1.5%
1910	441	+7.3%
1920	440	−0.2%
1930	474	+7.7%

Year	Pop.	±%
1941	456	−3.8%
1950	423	−7.2%
1960	418	−1.2%
1970	422	+1.0%
1980	516	+22.3%

Year	Pop.	±%
1990	613	+18.8%
2000	744	+21.4%

== Politics ==
In the 2011 federal election the most popular party was the SPS which received 41.8% of the vote. The next three most popular parties were the SVP (24.9%), the CVP (15.9%) and the Green Party (4.6%).

The SPS gained an additional 6.3% of the vote from the 2007 Federal election (35.5% in 2007 vs 41.8% in 2011). The SVP retained about the same popularity (26.3% in 2007), the CVP lost popularity (23.9% in 2007) and the Green moved from below fourth place in 2007 to fourth. A total of 308 votes were cast in this election, of which 4 or 1.3% were invalid.

== Economy ==
As of 2010, Remaufens had an unemployment rate of 2.8%. As of 2008, there were 36 people employed in the primary economic sector and about 14 businesses involved in this sector. 81 people were employed in the secondary sector and there were 11 businesses in this sector. 109 people were employed in the tertiary sector, with 14 businesses in this sector. There were 376 residents of the municipality who were employed in some capacity, of which females made up 41.5% of the workforce.

In 2008 the total number of full-time equivalent jobs was 193. The number of jobs in the primary sector was 27, all of which were in agriculture. The number of jobs in the secondary sector was 70 of which 38 or (54.3%) were in manufacturing and 33 (47.1%) were in construction. The number of jobs in the tertiary sector was 96. In the tertiary sector; 35 or 36.5% were in wholesale or retail sales or the repair of motor vehicles, 4 or 4.2% were in a hotel or restaurant, 1 was in the information industry, 3 or 3.1% were the insurance or financial industry, 6 or 6.3% were in education.

In 2000, there were 43 workers who commuted into the municipality and 294 workers who commuted away. The municipality is a net exporter of workers, with about 6.8 workers leaving the municipality for every one entering. Of the working population, 13% used public transportation to get to work, and 71% used a private car.

== Religion ==
From the 2000 census, 557 or 74.9% were Roman Catholic, while 79 or 10.6% belonged to the Swiss Reformed Church. Of the rest of the population, there were 6 members of an Orthodox church (or about 0.81% of the population), and there were 16 individuals (or about 2.15% of the population) who belonged to another Christian church. There were 19 (or about 2.55% of the population) who were Islamic. There were 1 individual who belonged to another church. 34 (or about 4.57% of the population) belonged to no church, are agnostic or atheist, and 40 individuals (or about 5.38% of the population) did not answer the question.

== Education ==
In Remaufens about 257 or (34.5%) of the population have completed non-mandatory upper secondary education, and 53 or (7.1%) have completed additional higher education (either university or a Fachhochschule). Of the 53 who completed tertiary schooling, 58.5% were Swiss men, 20.8% were Swiss women, 9.4% were non-Swiss men and 11.3% were non-Swiss women.

The Canton of Fribourg school system provides one year of non-obligatory Kindergarten, followed by six years of Primary school. This is followed by three years of obligatory lower Secondary school where the students are separated according to ability and aptitude. Following the lower Secondary students may attend a three or four year optional upper Secondary school. The upper Secondary school is divided into gymnasium (university preparatory) and vocational programs. After they finish the upper Secondary program, students may choose to attend a Tertiary school or continue their apprenticeship.

During the 2010-11 school year, there were a total of 105 students attending 6 classes in Remaufens. A total of 181 students from the municipality attended any school, either in the municipality or outside of it. There were 2 kindergarten classes with a total of 28 students in the municipality. The municipality had 4 primary classes and 77 students. During the same year, there were no lower secondary classes in the municipality, but 40 students attended lower secondary school in a neighboring municipality. There were no upper Secondary classes or vocational classes, but there were 15 upper Secondary students and 16 upper Secondary vocational students who attended classes in another municipality. The municipality had no non-university Tertiary classes, but there was one non-university Tertiary student and 3 specialized Tertiary students who attended classes in another municipality.

As of 2000, there were 2 students in Remaufens who came from another municipality, while 69 residents attended schools outside the municipality.
