= Lac de Lussy =

Lake in Fribourg, Switzerland

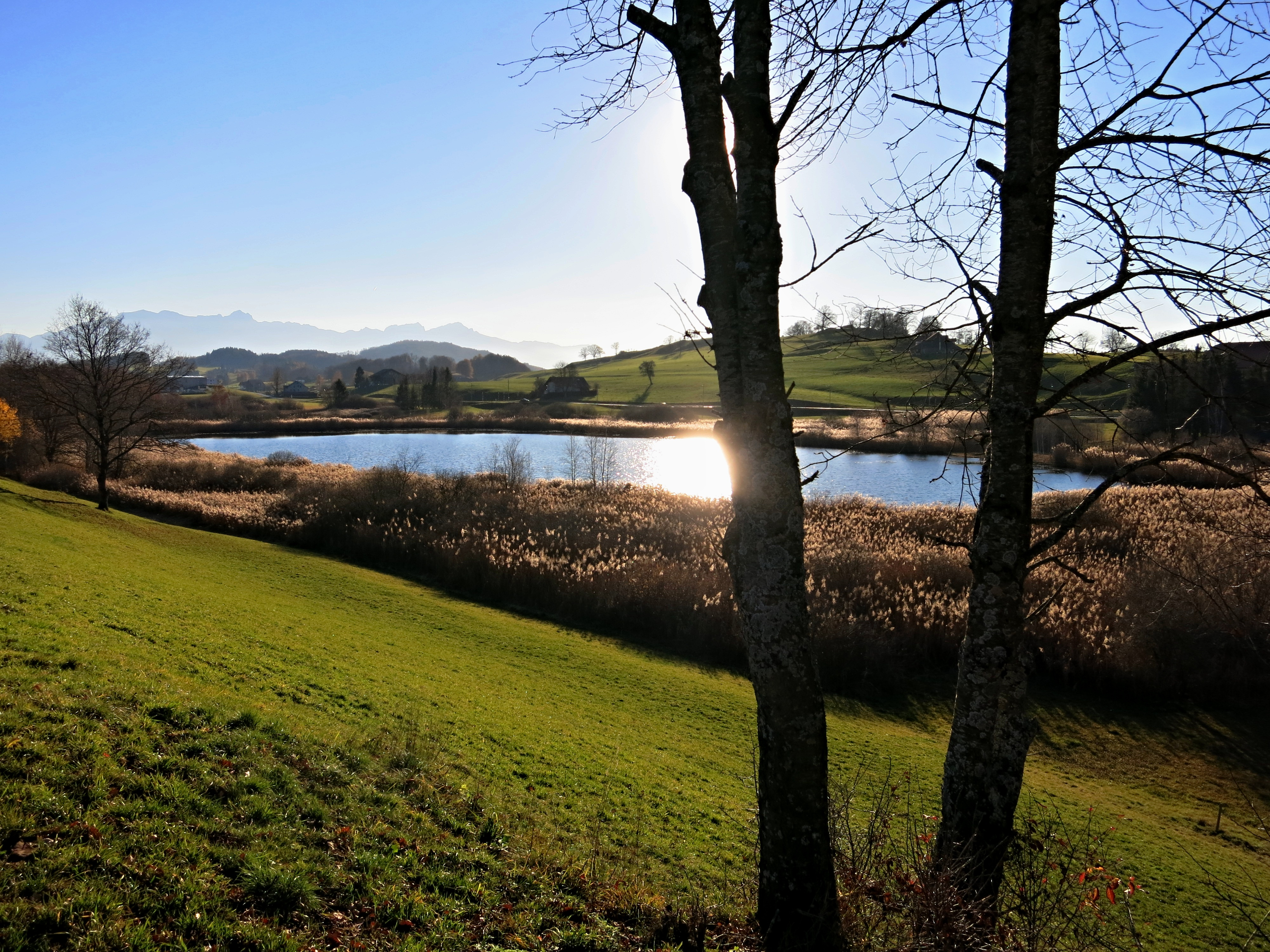

- Location within Canton of Fribourg Location within Switzerland Location within Alps
- Interactive map of Lac de Lussy
- Location: Châtel-Saint-Denis, Fribourg
- Coordinates: 46°32′39″N 6°54′00″E
- Basin countries: Switzerland
- Surface area: 2.03 km^{2} (0.78 sq mi)
- Surface elevation: 820 m (2,690 ft)

Lac de Lussy is a lake in the bog at Châtel-Saint-Denis, in the canton of Fribourg, Switzerland. The lake and bog are part of a nature preserve, listed in the Inventory of Mire Landscapes of Particular Beauty and National Importance.
