= Semsales =

- Municipality
- Flag Coat of arms
- Location of Semsales
- Location within Switzerland Location within Canton of Fribourg
- Coordinates: 46°34′N 6°56′E
- Country: Switzerland
- Canton: Fribourg
- District: Veveyse

Government
  - Mayor: Syndic

Area
  - Total: 29.4 km^{2} (11.4 sq mi)
- Elevation: 866 m (2,841 ft)

Population (December 2020)
  - Total: 1,426
  - Density: 48.5/km^{2} (126/sq mi)
- Time zone: UTC+01:00 (CET)
  - Summer (DST): UTC+02:00 (CEST)
- Postal code: 1623
- SFOS number: 2336
- ISO 3166 code: CH-FR
- Surrounded by: Châtel-Saint-Denis, Gruyères, Haut-Intyamon, La Verrerie, Maracon (VD), Saint-Martin, Sâles, Vaulruz
- Website: semsales.ch

Semsales (French: [sɑ̃sɑl]; Arpitan: Semsâles [ʃɛ̃ˈθɑlɛ]) is a municipality in the district of Veveyse in the canton of Fribourg in Switzerland.

== History ==
Semsales is first mentioned about 1100 as septem salis.

== Geography ==
Semsales has an area of 29.36 km^{2} (11.34 sq mi). Of this area, 13.68 km^{2} (5.28 mi^{2}) or 46.6% is used for agricultural purposes, while 14.14 km^{2} (5.46 mi^{2}) or 48.2% is forested. Of the rest of the land, 1 km^{2} (0.39 mi^{2}) or 3.4% is settled (buildings or roads), 0.14 km^{2} (35 acres) or 0.5% is either rivers or lakes and 0.43 km^{2} (0.17 mi^{2}) or 1.5% is unproductive land.

Of the built up area, housing and buildings made up 1.5% and transportation infrastructure made up 1.6%. Out of the forested land, 45.3% of the total land area is heavily forested and 2.4% is covered with orchards or small clusters of trees. Of the agricultural land, 5.7% is used for growing crops and 20.3% is pastures and 20.4% is used for alpine pastures. All the water in the municipality is flowing water.

The municipality is located in the Veveyse district, at the foot of the Fribourg pre-alpine mountains (Niremont, Les Alpettes). It lies along an important transportation axis including; the Bulle-Châtel-Saint-Denis road, the A12 motorway and the Bulle-Palézieux rail line. It consists of the village of Semsales and, since 1 January 1968, the former municipality of La Rougève.

Aerial view from 200 m by Walter Mittelholzer (1925)

== Coat of arms ==
The blazon of the municipal coat of arms is Azure two Columns issuant from as many Mounts all Argent encircled with seven Mullet of Five three and two and two.

== Demographics ==
Semsales has a population (as of December 2020) of 1,426. As of 2008, 10.4% of the population are resident foreign nationals. Over the last 10 years (2000–2010) the population has changed at a rate of 13%. Migration accounted for 9.8%, while births and deaths accounted for 1.3%.

Most of the population (as of 2000) speaks French (956 or 93.8%) as their first language, German is the second most common (29 or 2.8%) and Portuguese is the third (9 or 0.9%). There are 7 people who speak Italian. There are also 6 people who speak English.

As of 2008, the population was 49.2% male and 50.8% female. The population was made up of 489 Swiss men (43.3% of the population) and 67 (5.9%) non-Swiss men. There were 521 Swiss women (46.1%) and 53 (4.7%) non-Swiss women. Of the population in the municipality, 457 or about 44.8% were born in Semsales and lived there in 2000. There were 260 or 25.5% who were born in the same canton, while 171 or 16.8% were born somewhere else in Switzerland, and 80 or 7.9% were born outside of Switzerland.

As of 2000, children and teenagers (0–19 years old) make up 23.6% of the population, while adults (20–64 years old) make up 60.7% and seniors (over 64 years old) make up 15.7%.

As of 2000, there were 410 people who were single and never married in the municipality. There were 480 married individuals, 72 widows or widowers and 57 individuals who are divorced.

As of 2000, there were 407 private households in the municipality, and an average of 2.4 persons per household. There were 114 households that consist of only one person and 28 households with five or more people. In 2000, a total of 394 apartments (81.6% of the total) were permanently occupied, while 69 apartments (14.3%) were seasonally occupied and 20 apartments (4.1%) were empty. As of 2009, the construction rate of new housing units was 12.3 new units per 1000 residents. The vacancy rate for the municipality, in 2010, was 0.19%.

The historical population is given in the following chart:

== Politics ==
In the 2011 federal election the most popular party was the SVP which received 26.4% of the vote. The next three most popular parties were the SPS (23.4%), the CVP (20.4%) and the FDP (17.2%).

The SVP improved their position in Semsales rising to first, from second in 2007 (with 22.8%) The SPS moved from third in 2007 (with 20.8%) to second in 2011, the CVP moved from first in 2007 (with 29.2%) to third and the FDP retained about the same popularity (20.6% in 2007). A total of 398 votes were cast in this election, of which 7 or 1.8% were invalid.

== Economy ==
As of 2010, Semsales had an unemployment rate of 2.9%. As of 2008, there were 75 people employed in the primary economic sector and about 26 businesses involved in this sector. 114 people were employed in the secondary sector and there were 21 businesses in this sector. 110 people were employed in the tertiary sector, with 28 businesses in this sector. There were 542 residents of the municipality who were employed in some capacity, of which females made up 41.1% of the workforce.

In 2008 the total number of full-time equivalent jobs was 251. The number of jobs in the primary sector was 57, of which 48 were in agriculture and 9 were in forestry or lumber production. The number of jobs in the secondary sector was 109 of which 58 or (53.2%) were in manufacturing and 51 (46.8%) were in construction. The number of jobs in the tertiary sector was 85. In the tertiary sector; 41 or 48.2% were in wholesale or retail sales or the repair of motor vehicles, 5 or 5.9% were in the movement and storage of goods, 11 or 12.9% were in a hotel or restaurant, 3 or 3.5% were the insurance or financial industry, 2 or 2.4% were technical professionals or scientists, 8 or 9.4% were in education and 3 or 3.5% were in health care.

In 2000, there were 83 workers who commuted into the municipality and 378 workers who commuted away. The municipality is a net exporter of workers, with about 4.6 workers leaving the municipality for every one entering. Of the working population, 7.6% used public transportation to get to work, and 71.2% used a private car.

== Religion ==
From the 2000 census, 817 or 80.2% were Roman Catholic, while 80 or 7.9% belonged to the Swiss Reformed Church. Of the rest of the population, there were 5 members of an Orthodox church (or about 0.49% of the population), and there were 12 individuals (or about 1.18% of the population) who belonged to another Christian church. There was 1 individual who was Jewish, and 8 (or about 0.79% of the population) who were Islamic. There was 1 person who was Hindu and 2 individuals who belonged to another church. 58 (or about 5.69% of the population) belonged to no church, are agnostic or atheist, and 41 individuals (or about 4.02% of the population) did not answer the question.

== Education ==
In Semsales about 316 or (31.0%) of the population have completed non-mandatory upper secondary education, and 84 or (8.2%) have completed additional higher education (either university or a Fachhochschule). Of the 84 who completed tertiary schooling, 63.1% were Swiss men, 21.4% were Swiss women, 8.3% were non-Swiss men and 7.1% were non-Swiss women.

The Canton of Fribourg school system provides one year of non-obligatory Kindergarten, followed by six years of Primary school. This is followed by three years of obligatory lower Secondary school where the students are separated according to ability and aptitude. Following the lower Secondary students may attend a three or four year optional upper Secondary school. The upper Secondary school is divided into gymnasium (university preparatory) and vocational programs. After they finish the upper Secondary program, students may choose to attend a Tertiary school or continue their apprenticeship.

During the 2010-11 school year, there were a total of 135 students attending 7 classes in Semsales. A total of 201 students from the municipality attended any school, either in the municipality or outside of it. There were 2 kindergarten classes with a total of 31 students in the municipality. The municipality had 5 primary classes and 104 students. During the same year, there were no lower secondary classes in the municipality, but 37 students attended lower secondary school in a neighboring municipality. There were no upper Secondary classes or vocational classes, but there were 6 upper Secondary students and 23 upper Secondary vocational students who attended classes in another municipality. The municipality had no non-university Tertiary classes, but there was one specialized Tertiary student who attended classes in another municipality.

As of 2000, there were 34 students in Semsales who came from another municipality, while 77 residents attended schools outside the municipality.

Notably, Semsales has a large percentage of youth who chose to attend post-secondary schools overseas in Canada. One such resident, Joane Maillard, has gone on to be a "Nova Scotia future women leaders" award winner at the Gerald Schwartz School of Business.
