= Saint-Martin, Fribourg =

Municipality in Switzerland

Saint-Martin
- Municipality
- Coat of arms
- Location of Saint-Martin
- Location within Switzerland Location within Canton of Fribourg
- Coordinates: 46°35′N 6°52′E
- Country: Switzerland
- Canton: Fribourg
- District: Veveyse

Government
  - Mayor: Syndic

Area
  - Total: 8.75 km^{2} (3.38 sq mi)
- Elevation: 833 m (2,733 ft)

Population (December 2020)
  - Total: 1,026
  - Density: 117/km^{2} (304/sq mi)
- Time zone: UTC+01:00 (CET)
  - Summer (DST): UTC+02:00 (CEST)
- Postal code: 1609
- SFOS number: 2335
- ISO 3166 code: CH-FR
- Localities: Besencens, Fiaugères
- Surrounded by: Bussigny-sur-Oron (VD), Chesalles-sur-Oron (VD), La Verrerie, Le Flon, Maracon (VD), Semsales
- Website: http://www.saint-martin-fr.ch SFSO statistics

Saint-Martin (French pronunciation: [sɛ̃ maʁtɛ̃]; Arpitan: Sent-Martin) is a municipality in the district of Veveyse in the canton of Fribourg, in Switzerland.

== History ==
Saint-Martin is first mentioned in 1228 as Sanctus Martinus.

== Geography ==
Saint-Martin has an area of 9.78 km^{2} (3.78 sq mi). Of this area, 7.54 km^{2} (2.91 mi^{2}) or 77.0% is used for agricultural purposes, while 1.58 km^{2} (0.61 mi^{2}) or 16.1% is forested. Of the rest of the land, 0.55 km^{2} (0.21 mi^{2}) or 5.6% is settled (buildings or roads), 0.02 km^{2} (4.9 acres) or 0.2% is either rivers or lakes, and 0.07 km^{2} (17 acres) or 0.7% is unproductive land.

Of the built up area, housing and buildings made up 3.6%, and transportation infrastructure made up 1.9%. Out of the forested land, 13.7% of the total land area is heavily forested, and 2.5% is covered with orchards or small clusters of trees. Of the agricultural land, 19.5% is used for growing crops, and 56.5% is pastures. All the water in the municipality is flowing water.

The municipality is located in the Veveyse district. It consists of the villages of Saint-Martin, Besencens, and Fiaugères, as well as the hamlet of Le Jordil.

On 1 January 2004, Saint-Martin annexed Besencens and Fiaugères, which were formerly municipalities in their own right.

== Population ==
Saint-Martin has a population (as of December 2018) of 1,005. As of 2008, 5.9% of the population are resident foreign nationals. Over the last 10 years (2000–2010), the population has changed at a rate of 11.3%. Migration accounted for 9.5%, while births and deaths accounted for 3.2%. Most of the population (as of 2000) speaks French (468 or 92.7%) as their first language. Albanian is the second most commonly spoken language (13 or 2.6%), and German is the third (12 or 2.4%). There is 1 person who speaks Italian.

As of 2008, the population was 50.5% male and 49.5% female. The population was made up of 419 Swiss men (47.2% of the population) and 29 (3.3%) non-Swiss men. There were 411 Swiss women (46.3%) and 29 (3.3%) non-Swiss women. Of the population in the municipality, 184 or about 36.4% were born in Saint-Martin and lived there in 2000. There were 111 or 22.0% who were born in the same canton, while 144 or 28.5% were born somewhere else in Switzerland, and 57 or 11.3% were born outside of Switzerland.

As of 2000, children and teenagers (0–19 years old) make up 30.6% of the population, while adults (20–64 years old) make up 55.9%, and seniors (over 64 years old) make up 13.5%.

As of 2000, there were 233 people who were single and never married in the municipality. There were 236 married individuals, 25 widows or widowers, and 11 individuals who are divorced.

As of 2000, there were 281 private households in the municipality and an average of 2.9 persons per household. There were 30 households that consist of only one person and 26 households with five or more people. In 2000, a total of 164 apartments (85.9% of the total) were permanently occupied, while 20 apartments (10.5%) were seasonally occupied, and 7 apartments (3.7%) were empty. The vacancy rate for the municipality, in 2010, was 1.14%.

The historical population is given in the following chart:

== Politics ==
In the 2011 federal election, the most popular party was the SVP, which received 27.2% of the vote. The next three most popular parties were the SPS (24.2%), the CVP (19.0%), and the FDP (10.8%).

The SVP lost about 6.4% of the vote when compared to the 2007 Federal election (33.6% in 2007 vs 27.2% in 2011). The SPS moved from third in 2007 (with 24.0%) to second in 2011, the CVP moved from second in 2007 (with 24.9%) to third, and the FDP retained about the same popularity (6.4% in 2007). A total of 296 votes were cast in this election, of which 4 or 1.4% were invalid.

== Economy ==
As of 2010, Saint-Martin had an unemployment rate of 1.9%. As of 2008, there were 91 people employed in the primary economic sector and about 39 businesses involved in this sector. 19 people were employed in the secondary sector, and there were 7 businesses in this sector. 67 people were employed in the tertiary sector, with 17 businesses in this sector. There were 237 residents of the municipality who were employed in some capacity, of which females made up 41.4% of the workforce.

In 2008, the total number of full-time equivalent jobs was 137. The number of jobs in the primary sector was 68, all of which were in agriculture. The number of jobs in the secondary sector was 16, of which 7 or (43.8%) were in manufacturing, and 10 (62.5%) were in construction. The number of jobs in the tertiary sector was 53. In the tertiary sector; 15 or 28.3% were in wholesale, retail sales, or the repair of motor vehicles, 9 or 17.0% were in the movement and storage of goods, 5 or 9.4% were in a hotel or restaurant, 3 or 5.7% were technical professionals or scientists, 5 or 9.4% were in education, and 1 was in health care.

In 2000, there were 20 workers who commuted into the municipality and 174 workers who commuted away. The municipality is a net exporter of workers, with about 8.7 workers leaving the municipality for every one entering. Of the working population, 7.9% used public transportation to get to work, and 63.3% used a private car.

== Religion ==
From the 2000 census, 333 or 65.9% were Roman Catholic, while 66 or 13.1% belonged to the Swiss Reformed Church. Of the rest of the population, there were 3 members of an Orthodox church (or about 0.59% of the population), and there were 40 individuals (or about 7.92% of the population) who belonged to another Christian church. There were 11 (or about 2.18% of the population) who were Islamic. There were 3 individuals who were Buddhist and 1 individual who belonged to another church. 53 (or about 10.50% of the population) belonged to no church, are agnostic or atheist, and 15 individuals (or about 2.97% of the population) did not answer the question.

== Education ==
In Saint-Martin, about 158 or (31.3%) of the population have completed non-mandatory upper secondary education, and 49 or (9.7%) have completed additional higher education (either university or a Fachhochschule). Of the 49 who completed tertiary schooling, 55.1% were Swiss men, and 38.8% were Swiss women.

The Canton of Fribourg school system provides one year of non-obligatory kindergarten, followed by six years of Primary school. This is followed by three years of obligatory lower Secondary school, where the students are separated according to ability and aptitude. Following the lower Secondary, students may attend a three or four year optional upper Secondary school. The upper Secondary school is divided into gymnasium (university preparatory) and vocational programs. After they finish the upper Secondary program, students may choose to attend a Tertiary school or continue their apprenticeship.

During the 2010-11 school year, there were a total of 91 students attending 5 classes in Saint-Martin. A total of 155 students from the municipality attended any school, either in the municipality or outside of it. There was one kindergarten class with a total of 16 students in the municipality. The municipality had 4 primary classes and 75 students. During the same year, there were no lower secondary classes in the municipality, but 42 students attended lower secondary school in a neighboring municipality. There were no upper Secondary classes or vocational classes, but there were 31 upper Secondary students and 28 upper Secondary vocational students who attended classes in another municipality. The municipality had no non-university Tertiary classes who attended classes in another municipality.

As of 2000, there were 41 students in Saint-Martin who came from another municipality, while 35 residents attended schools outside the municipality.

== Coat of arms ==
The blazon of the municipal coat of arms is Per fess Sable a Semi Eagle issuant displayed Or and Gules a Saltire Or.
